= Metro Line M3 (Budapest Metro) =

Rapid transit line in Budapest, Hungary

Overview
- Status: Operational
- Line number: Line 3 ("Blue metro")
- Termini: Kőbánya-Kispest; Újpest-Központ
- Stations: 20

Service
- Type: Rapid transit
- System: Budapest Metro
- Operator: BKK

History
- Opened: 31 December 1976; 49 years ago
- Last extension: 1990

Technical
- Line length: 16.5 km (10 mi)
- Track gauge: 1,435 mm (4 ft 8 1/2 in)
- Electrification: 825 V DC
- Operating speed: 80 km/h
Route map

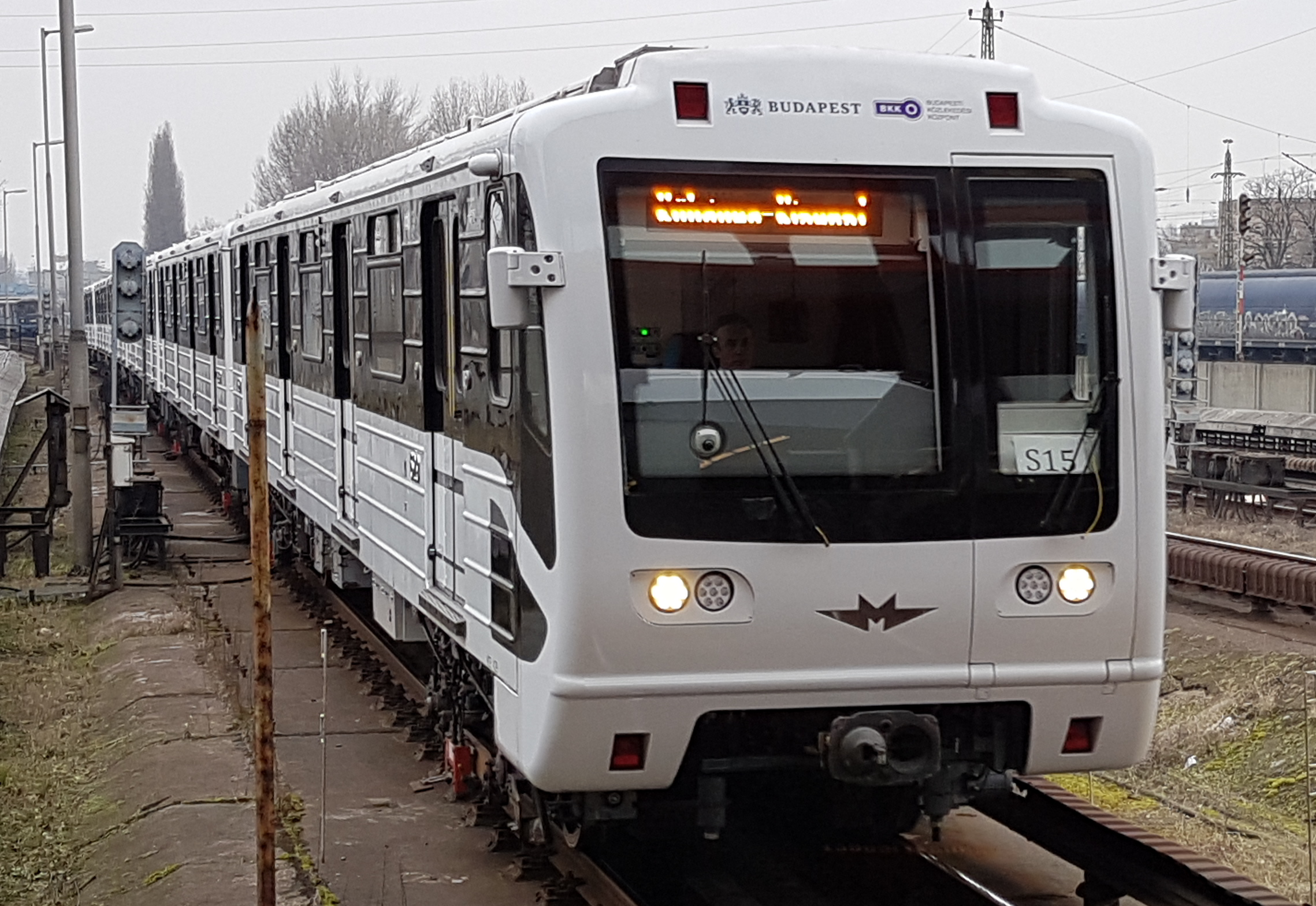
Refurbished train coming into the Kőbánya-Kispest terminus

Line M3 (Officially: North-South Line, Metro M3, and unofficially: Blue Line) is the third, longest, and busiest line of the Budapest Metro. It runs in a general north-south direction parallel to the Danube on the Pest side, roughly following Váci út south from Újpest to the city center, then following the route of Üllői út southeast to Kőbánya-Kispest. Its daily ridership is estimated at 500,000, accounting for approximately half of all trips on the Metro system. Like metro line M1, it does not serve Buda.

== History ==
The first decree for the third line was made in 1968. Construction started in 1970, and the first section was opened in 1976 with six stations. It was extended five stations to the south in 1980, and to the north in 1981, 1984 and 1990 with eventually nine extra stations, reaching its current length of 20 stations and 16.5 km (10 mi), the longest line in Budapest. Reconstructed 81-717/714 carriages, made by the Russian manufacturer Metrowagonmash, with the model number 81-717.2K/714.2K carriages operate on this line. Operation started with Ev3 carriages, made by Mytishchi Factory (later known as Metrowagonmash) in 1976, expanded to 81-717.2/714.2 trains, built by the same manufacturer, in 1980. Six-car trains provide space for 1,097 people. It was planned for a daily ridership of 800,000 people.

Line M3 runs in a north-south direction (more exactly, from north-northeast to southeast) through the city and connects several populous microraion with the downtown. It has a transfer station with line M1 and line M2 at Deák Ferenc tér, and a transfer station for line M4 at Kálvin tér.

=== 2017–2023 reconstruction ===
The Mayor of Budapest Gábor Demszky was warned in 2006 by BKV that the line would soon need reconstruction, but no steps towards this were made before the new mayor István Tarlós took office in 2010. Some trains were prone to burning or smoking issues, but this had caused neither fatalities nor serious injuries so far. Tarlós reacted by ordering the retirement of all trains that were more than 40 years old. He also started the reconstruction of the tracks, because they were reported as hazardous. In 2014, the mayor's administration published the plans for the complete reconstruction of the line and Viktor Orbán's government allowed the local government to finance the reconstruction of the trains by taking up loans. Repayment of the loans was guaranteed by the national government in case the municipal government was not able to pay. The municipal government requested EU funds to finance the reconstruction of the underground infrastructure (tunnels and stations), and the national government guaranteed that it would provide additional financing in case insufficient EU funds were obtained.

In January 2016 the first train for reconstruction was handed over to the Russian Metrowagonmash (the original manufacturer). Tarlós had preferred buying new trains, but was overruled by the Orbán government. The prototype of the reconstructed trains entered service on 20 March 2017. From then on, the number of reconstructed trains serving the line was scheduled to increase by 2 trains every month, and from 3 April 2018 onwards only reconstructed trains run on this line.

On 4 September 2017 contracts for reconstructing the tunnel and stations of the northern section (Dózsa György út – Újpest-Központ) were signed. The stations were to be finished by 31 December 2018, but in fact were only reopened on 30 March 2019. After the reopening of the stations, Újpest-Központ was renamed to Újpest-központ, to be in line with metro line M4's Újbuda-központ station and Újpest-Városkapu, originally planned to be renamed to Újpest vasútállomás to help navigation, ended up being renamed to Újpest-városkapu. Árpád híd station was planned to be renamed to Göncz Árpád városközpont, but only ended up being renamed in January 2020. Dózsa György út station had to be closed from 14 May 2022 all the way until 22 May 2023, as there wasn't an elevator installed when the station reopened, and was only reopened when the full reconstructed line was able to be used. The reconstruction of the southern section (Népliget – Kőbánya–Kispest) was started on 6 April 2019. On 22 October 2020, the southern, renovated section of line M3 was opened. Originally, Kőbánya-Kispest station was planned to be renamed to Kőbánya-Kispest vasútállomás, for a similar reason as Újpest-városkapu, but this change never took place. The reconstruction of the middle section (Klinikák – Lehel tér) started on 7 March 2020 with Arany János utca and Ferenciek tere stations, Corvin-negyed and Klinikák stations on 11 July 2020 and Deák Ferenc tér, Nyugati pályaudvar and Kálvin tér stations on 7 November 2020. The stations slowly reopened, with Klinikák (renamed to Semmelweis Klinikák), Corvin-negyed and Kálvin tér stations reopening on 16 May 2022, Ferenciek tere and Deák Ferenc stations on 23 January 2023, and with Arany János utca and Nyugati pályaudvar stations on 20 March 2023, the line operated in one section once again, instead of the previous 2 (Kőbánya-Kispest – Kálvin tér, Göncz Árpád városközpont – Újpest-központ) sections. Finally, on 22 May 2023, with Nagyvárad tér and Lehel tér stations, the 5 1/2-year-long reconstruction finished. After this reconstruction, the renewed trains will probably stay in service for more than 20 years before having to be replaced.

==== Criticism ====
Civil groups voiced their concerns over the lack of accessibility and air-conditioning. In response, Tarlós promised modular AC units would be installed on the trains and the government agreed to make all 20 stations accessible. During the reconstruction, all station have been converted to be accessible. However as of 2026, the trains have not received adequate air conditioning units.

=== Timeline ===
Segment	Date opened	Length
Deák Ferenc tér – Nagyvárad tér	31 December 1976	4.1 km
Nagyvárad tér – Kőbánya–Kispest	29 March 1980	4.9 km
Deák Ferenc tér – Lehel tér	30 December 1981	2.4 km
Lehel tér – Árpád híd	5 November 1984	1.7 km
Árpád híd – Újpest–Központ	14 December 1990	3.4 km
Total	20 Stations	16.5 km

=== Reconstructions ===
Stations	Closing stations	Opening stations
Dózsa György út – Újpest-Központ	4 November 2017	30 March 2019
Népliget – Kőbánya-Kispest	6 April 2019	22 October 2020
Semmelweis Klinikák – Kálvin tér	11 July, 7 November 2020	16 May 2022
Ferenciek tere – Deák Ferenc tér	7 March, 7 November 2020	23 January 2023
Arany János utca – Nyugati pályaudvar	7 March, 7 November 2020	20 March 2023
Nagyvárad tér, Lehel tér	14 May 2022	22 May 2023

=== Rolling stock ===
Time period	Name
1976 – 2018	Metrovagonmash Ev3
1980 – 2018	Metrovagonmash 81-717.2/714.2
1988 – 1995	Ganz–Hunslet G2
2017 – present	Metrovagonmash 81-717.2k/714.2k

== Stations and connections ==
Stations and connections of metro line M3
Kőbánya-Kispest – Újpest-központ
Travel Time minutes	Station	Travel Time minutes	Connection	Buildings / Monuments
0	Kőbánya-Kispest ♿	32	68, 85, 85E, 93, 93A, 98, 98E, 132E, 136, 148, 151, 182, 182A, 184, 193E, 200E, 202E, 268, 282E, 284E; Regional buses Hungarian State Railways (MÁV)	
2	Határ út ♿	30	42, 50, 52; 66, 66B, 66E, 84E, 89E, 94E, 99, 123, 123A, 142E, 194, 194B, 294E; Regional buses	
4	Pöttyös utca ♿	28		
5	Ecseri út ♿	27	3; 181, 254E, 281	
7	Népliget ♿	25	1, 1M; 83; 254E; Regional buses Long-distance buses	Népliget, Groupama Arena, Planetarium
9	Nagyvárad tér ♿	23	23, 24; 281	Semmelweis University Nagyvárad Téri Elméleti Tömb (NET), Hungarian Natural History Museum, Ludovika Military Academy
11	Semmelweis Klinikák ♿	21		Semmelweis University Clinic
12	Corvin-negyed ♿	20	4, 6; 223E; 83 (Üllői út)	Museum of Applied Arts
14	Kálvin tér ♿	18	47, 48, 49; 72, 83; 9, 15, 100E, 223E	Fővárosi Szabó Ervin Könyvtár, Hungarian National Museum
15	Ferenciek tere ♿	17	5, 7, 8E, 15, 107, 108E, 110, 112, 133E	
16	Deák Ferenc tér ♿	15	47, 48, 49; 9, 16, 100E, 105, 178, 210, 210B, 216	Deák Ferenc tér, Town Hall, Metro Museum (Földalatti Vasúti Múzeum)
17	Arany János utca ♿	14	72; 9	St. Stephen's Basilica
18	Nyugati pályaudvar ♿	12	4, 6; 72, 73; 9, 26, 91, 191, 226, 291; Hungarian State Railways (MÁV)	Nyugati pályaudvar, WestEnd City Center
22	Lehel tér ♿	10	14; 76; 15	Lehel csarnok
23	Dózsa György út ♿	9	75, 79	
25	Göncz Árpád városközpont (Note: The northbound platform has barrier-free access only through the stop of tram line 1.) ♿	7	1, 1M; 26, 32, 34, 106, 120; Regional buses	
27	Forgách utca ♿	5	32	
29	Gyöngyösi utca ♿	3	15, 105, 210, 210B	
31	Újpest-városkapu ♿	1	104, 104A, 121, 122E, 196, 196A, 204; Regional buses Long-distance buses Hungarian State Railways (MÁV)	
32	Újpest-központ ♿	0	12, 14; 25, 30, 30A, 104, 104A, 120, 147, 170, 196, 196A, 204, 220, 230, 270; Regional buses	

== Gallery about M3 metro stations before the reconstruction ==
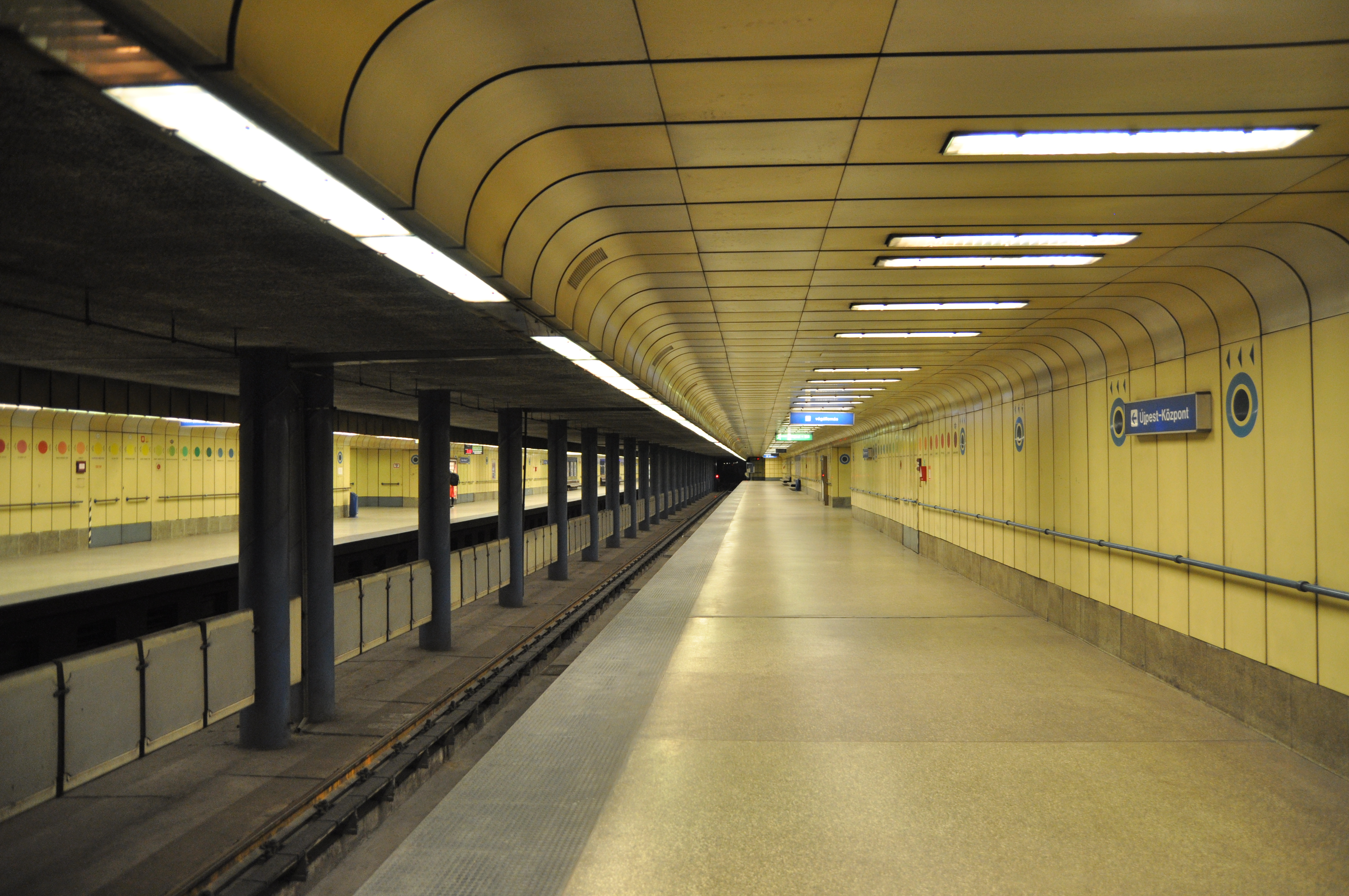
Újpest-Központ

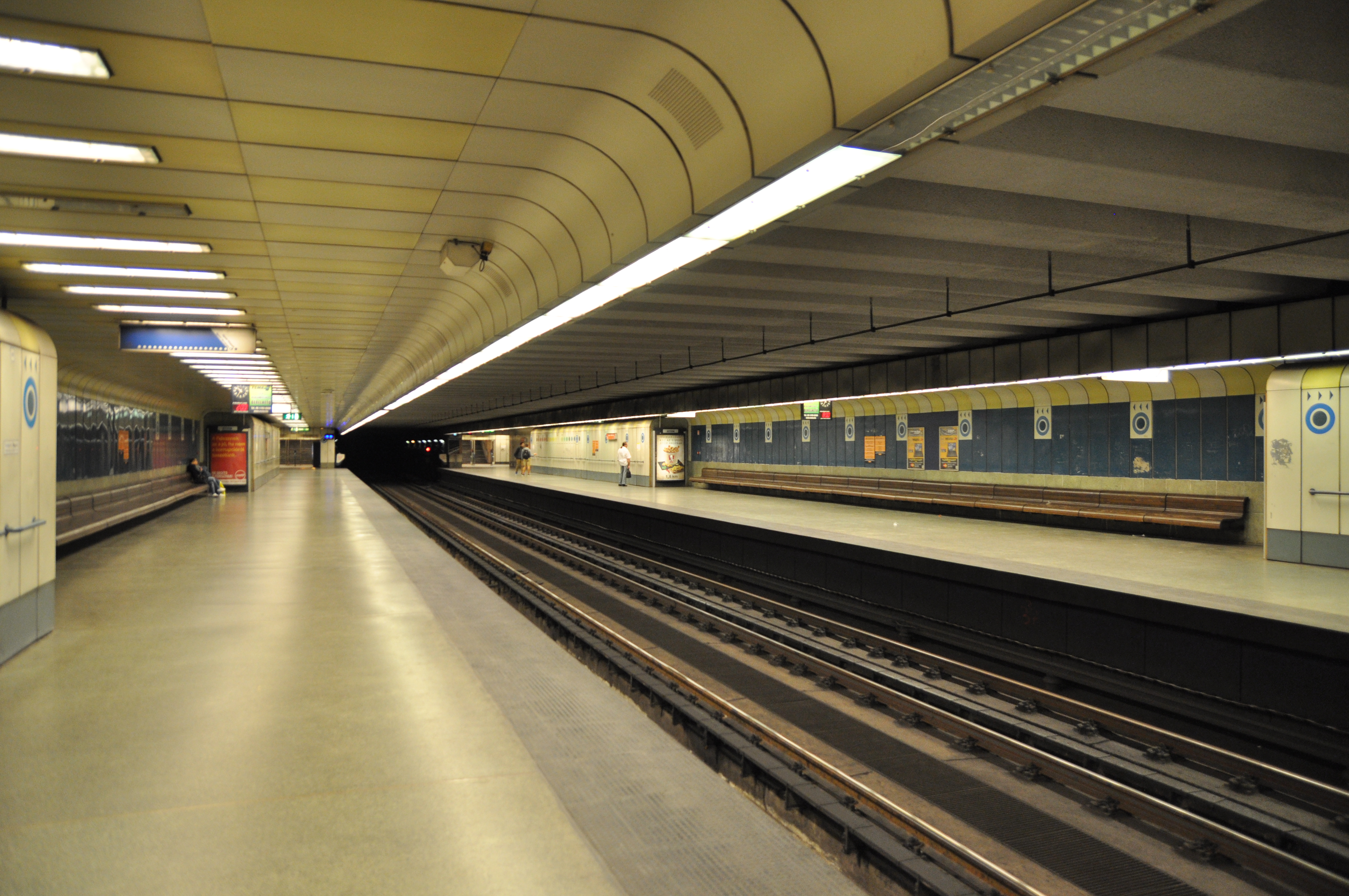
Újpest-Városkapu

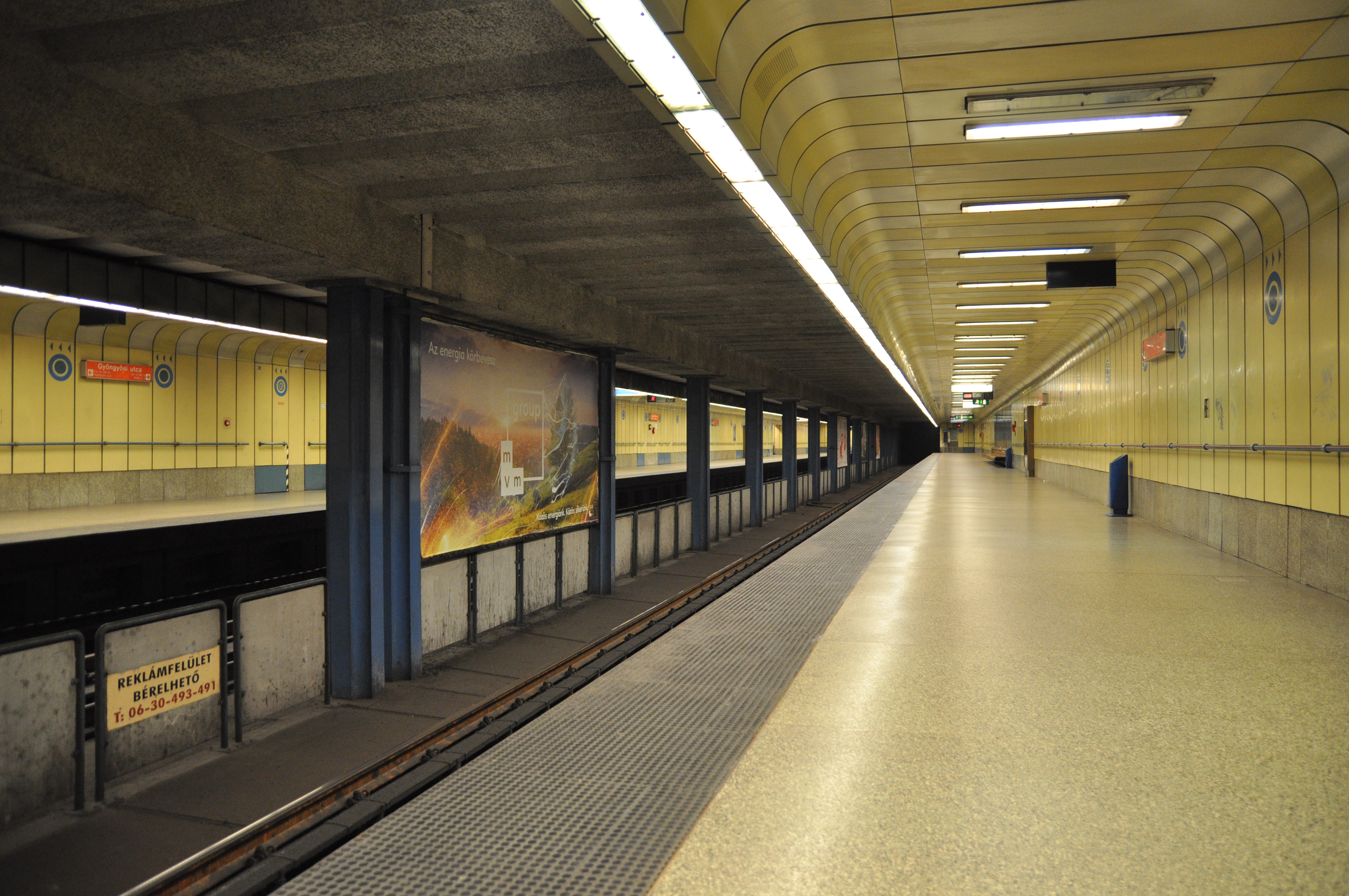
Gyöngyösi utca

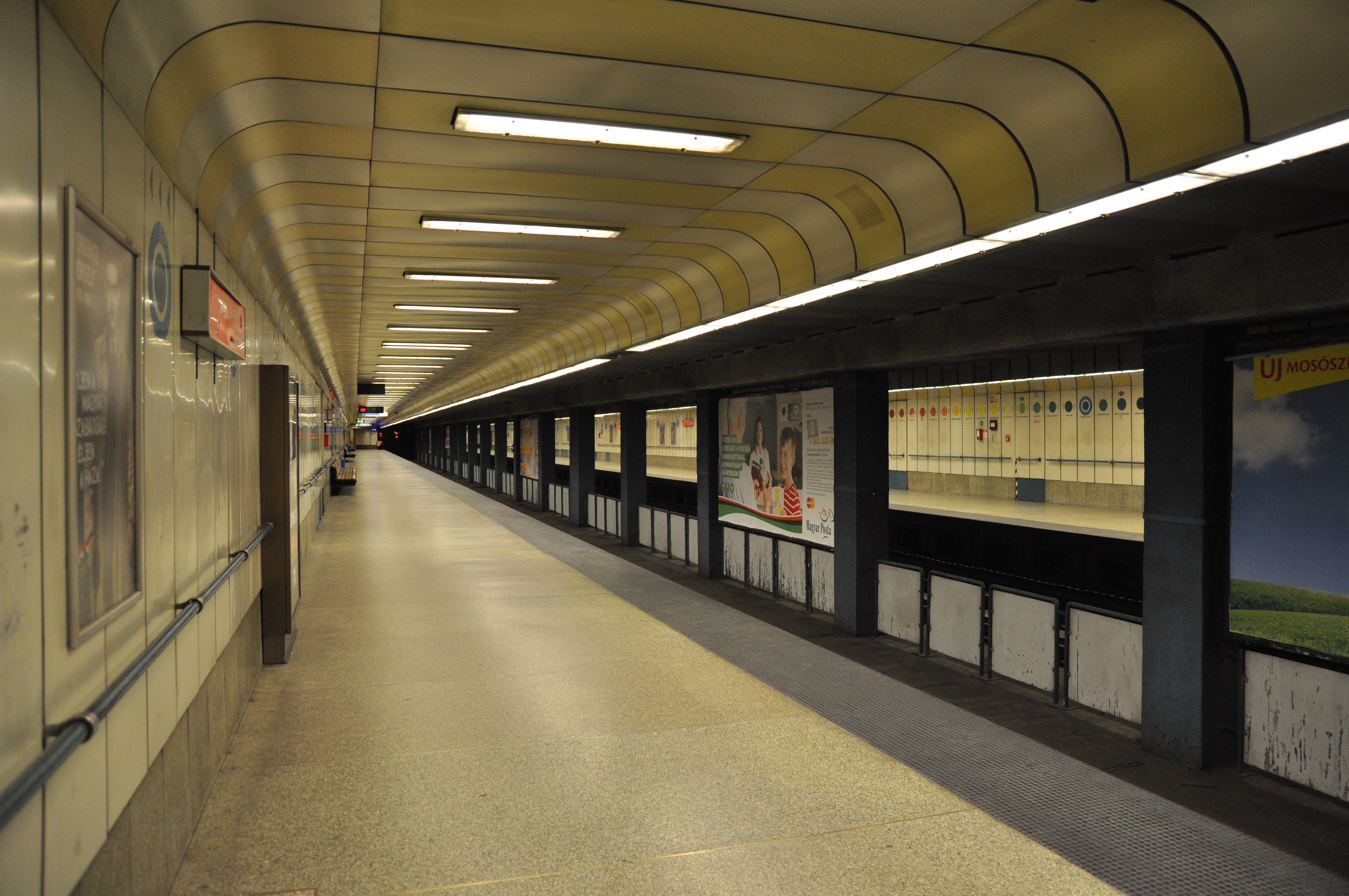
Forgách utca

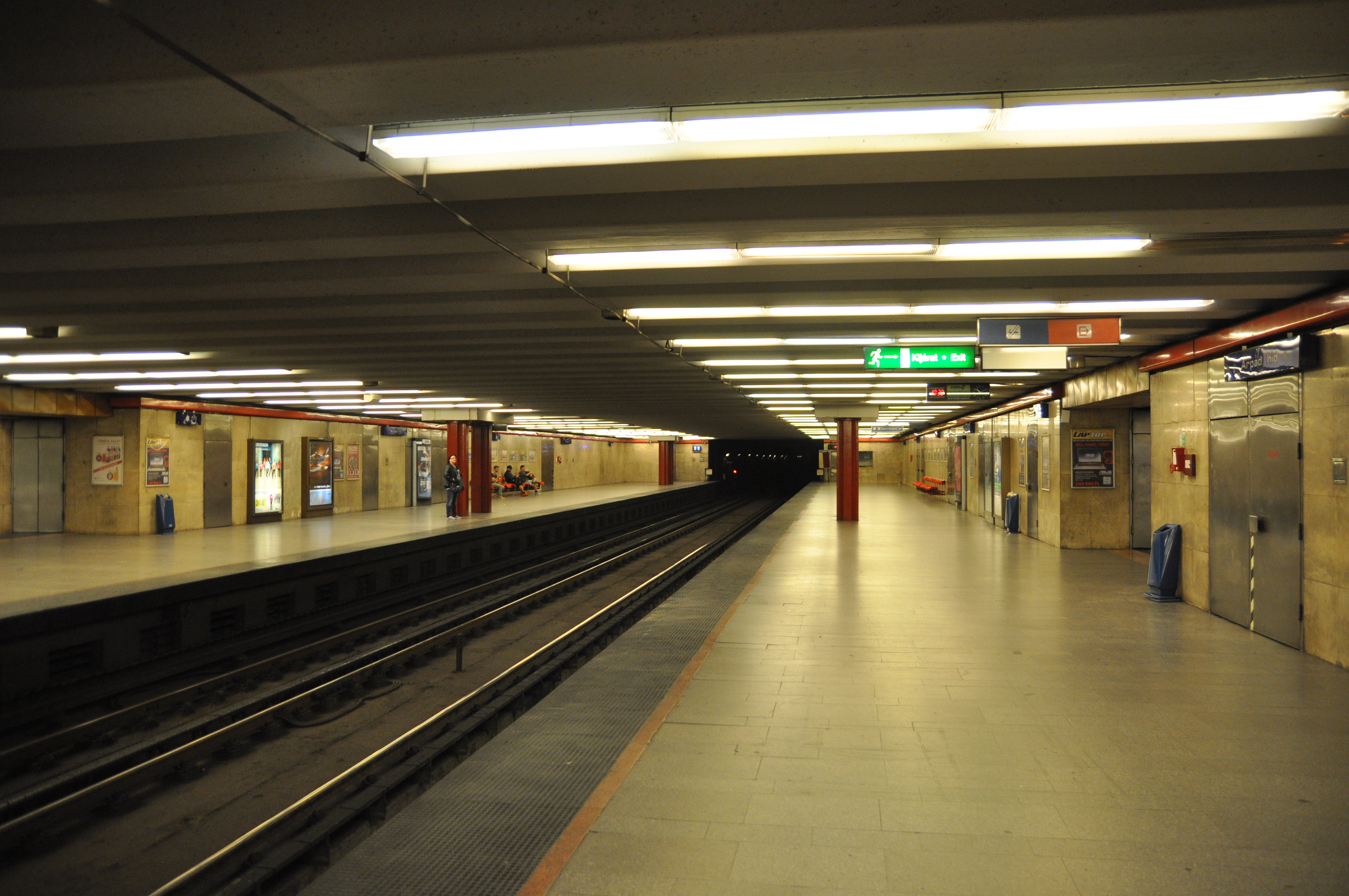
Árpád híd

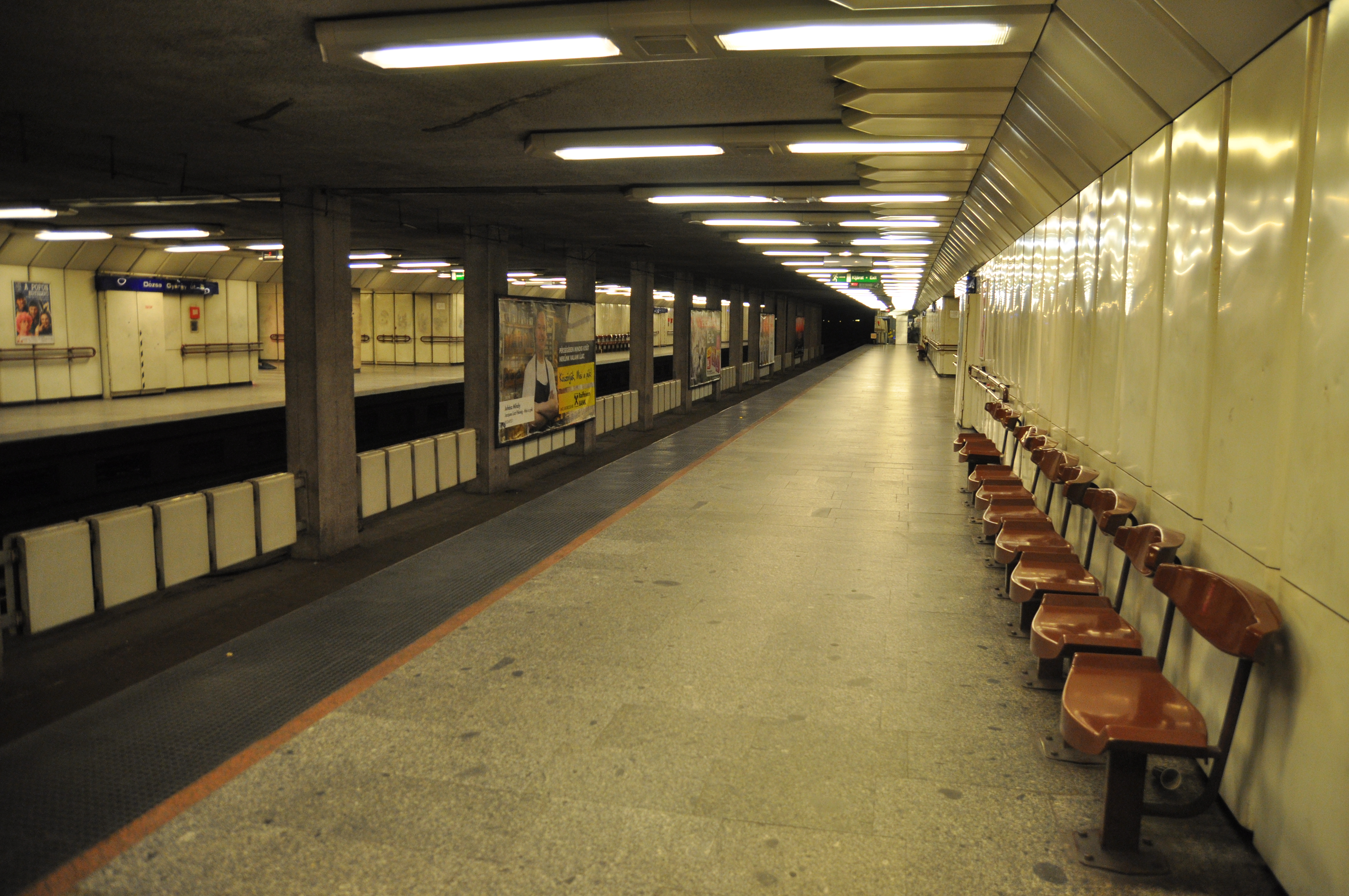
Dózsa György út

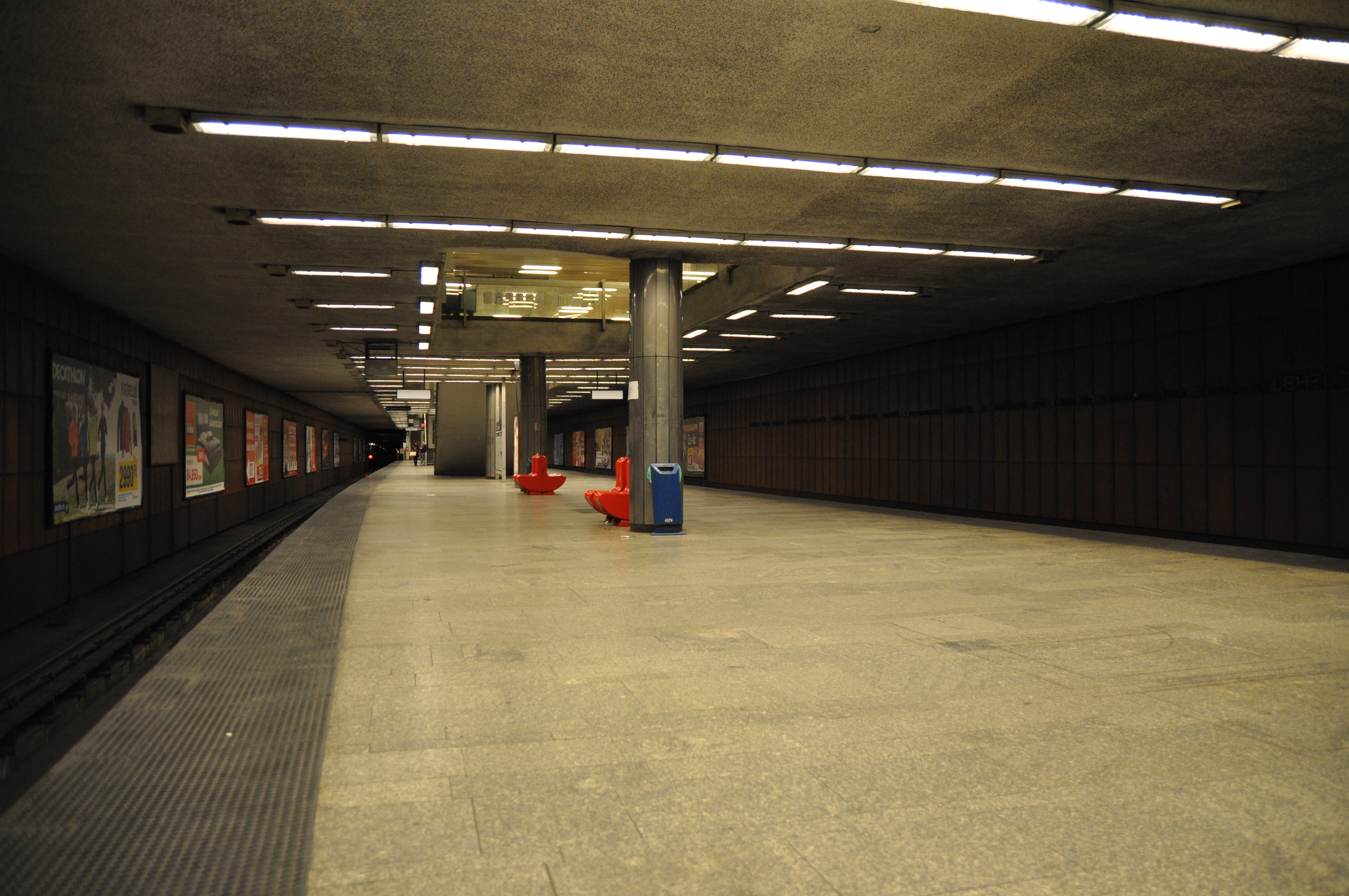
Lehel tér

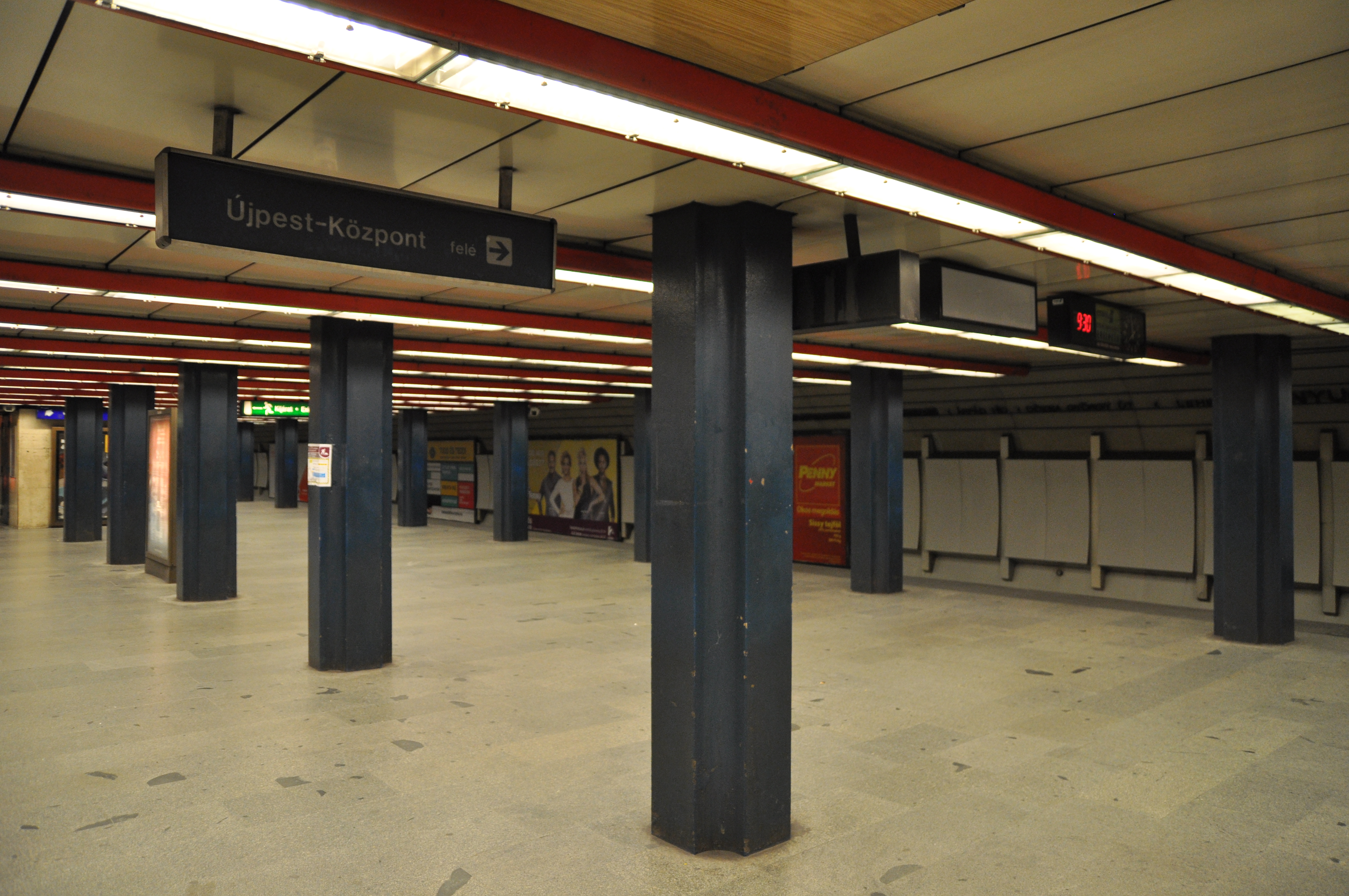
Nyugati pályaudvar

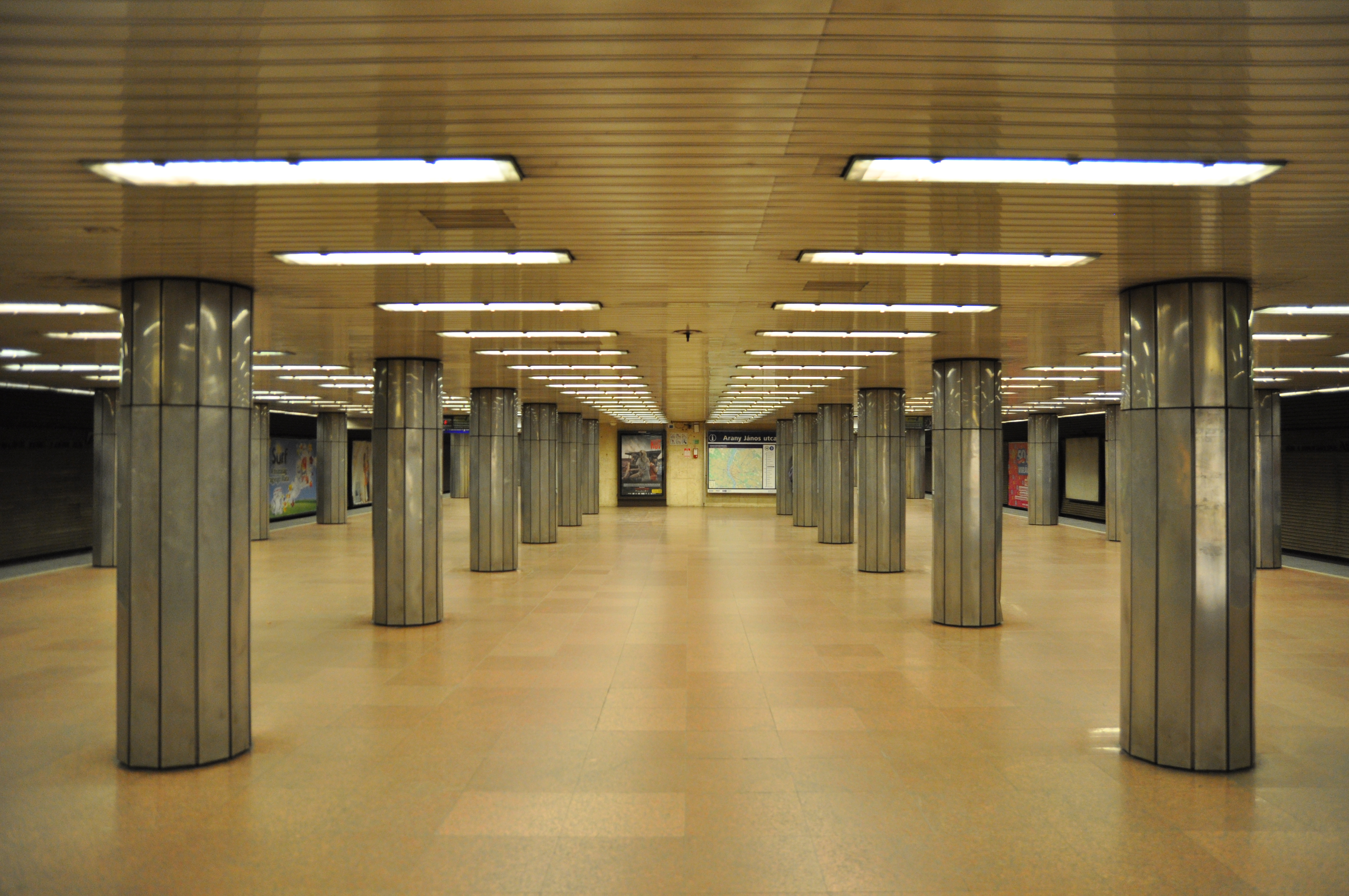
Arany János utca

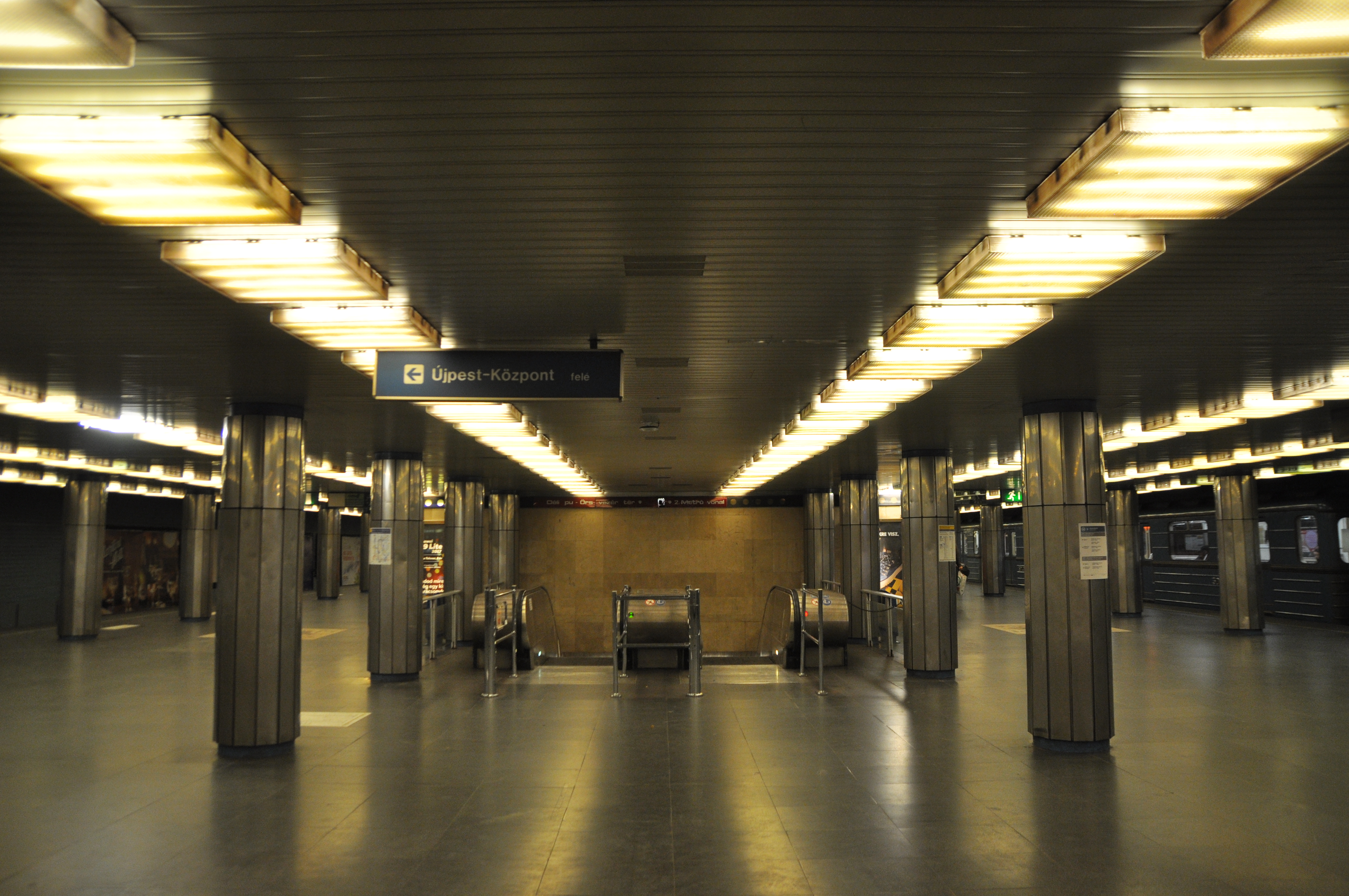
Deák Ferenc tér

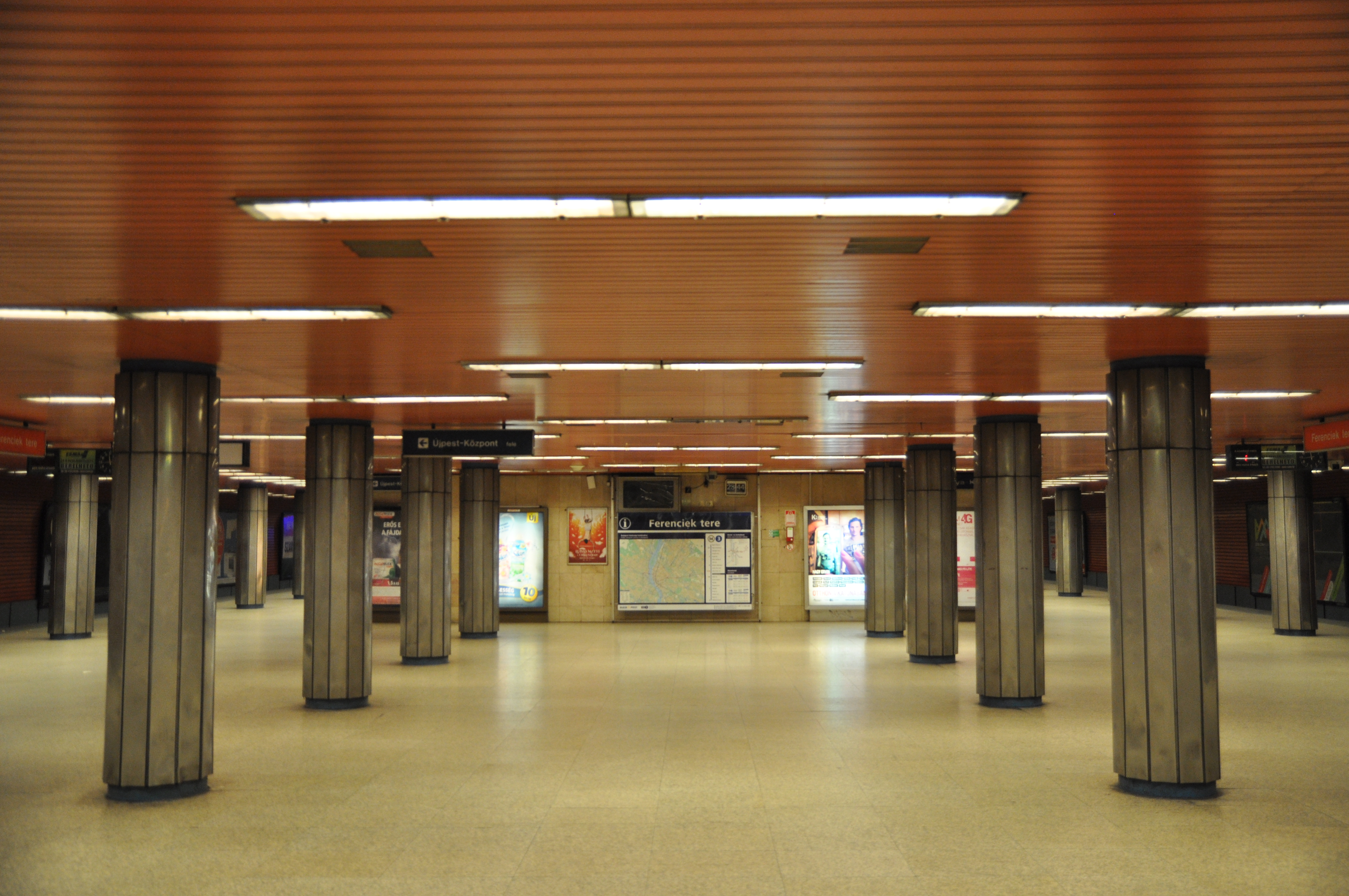
Ferenciek tere

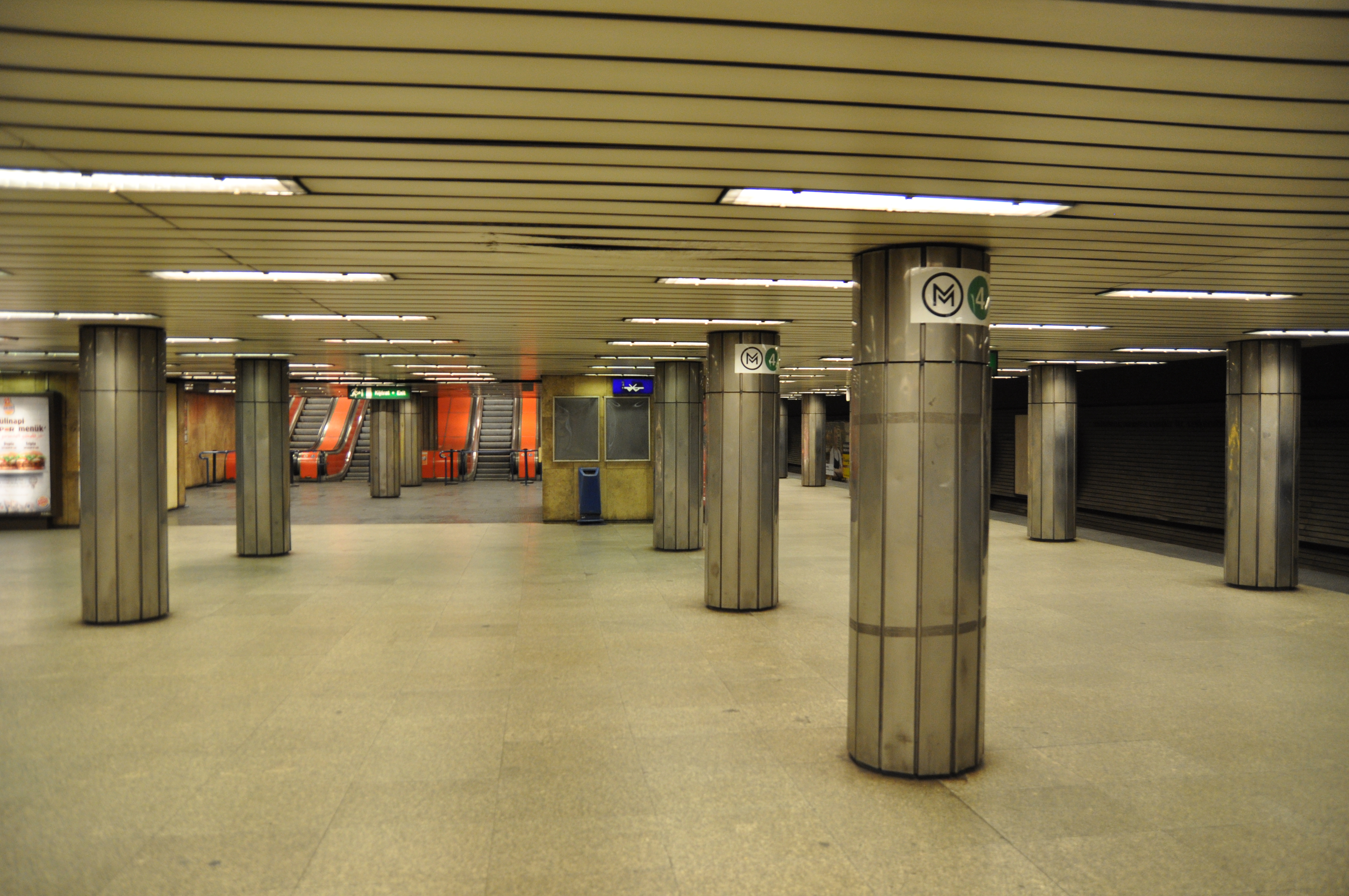
Kálvin tér

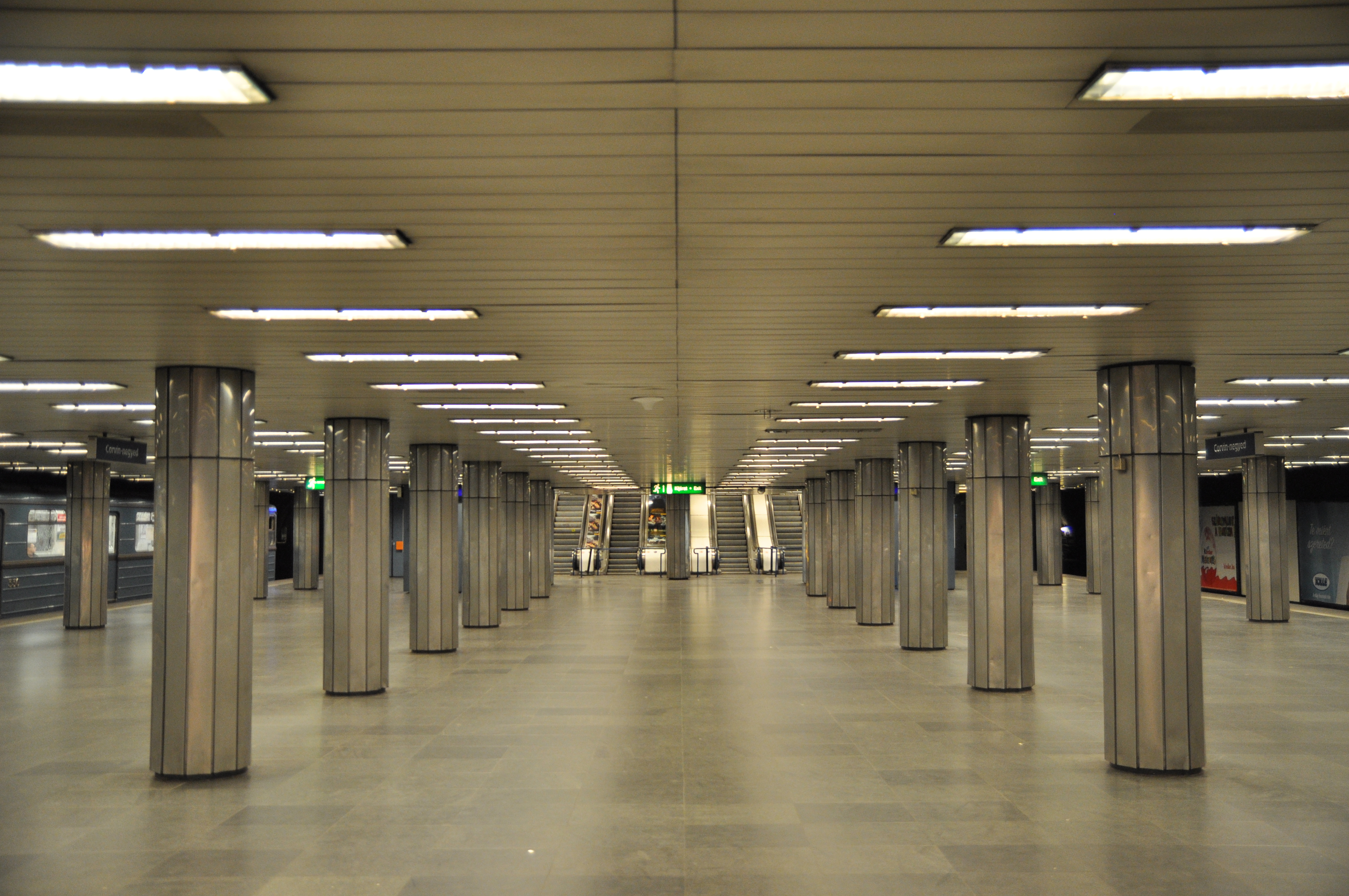
Corvin-negyed

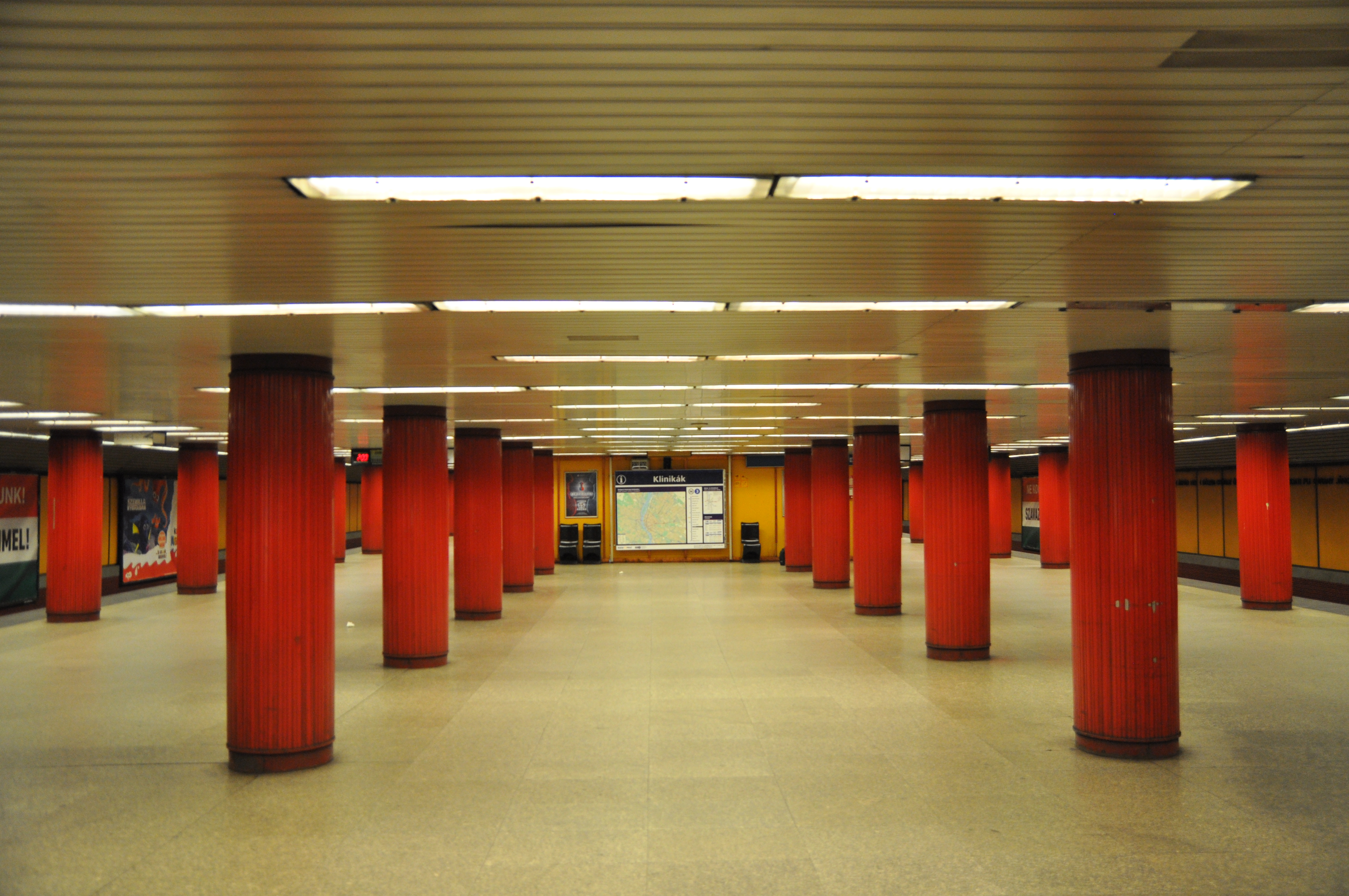
Klinikák

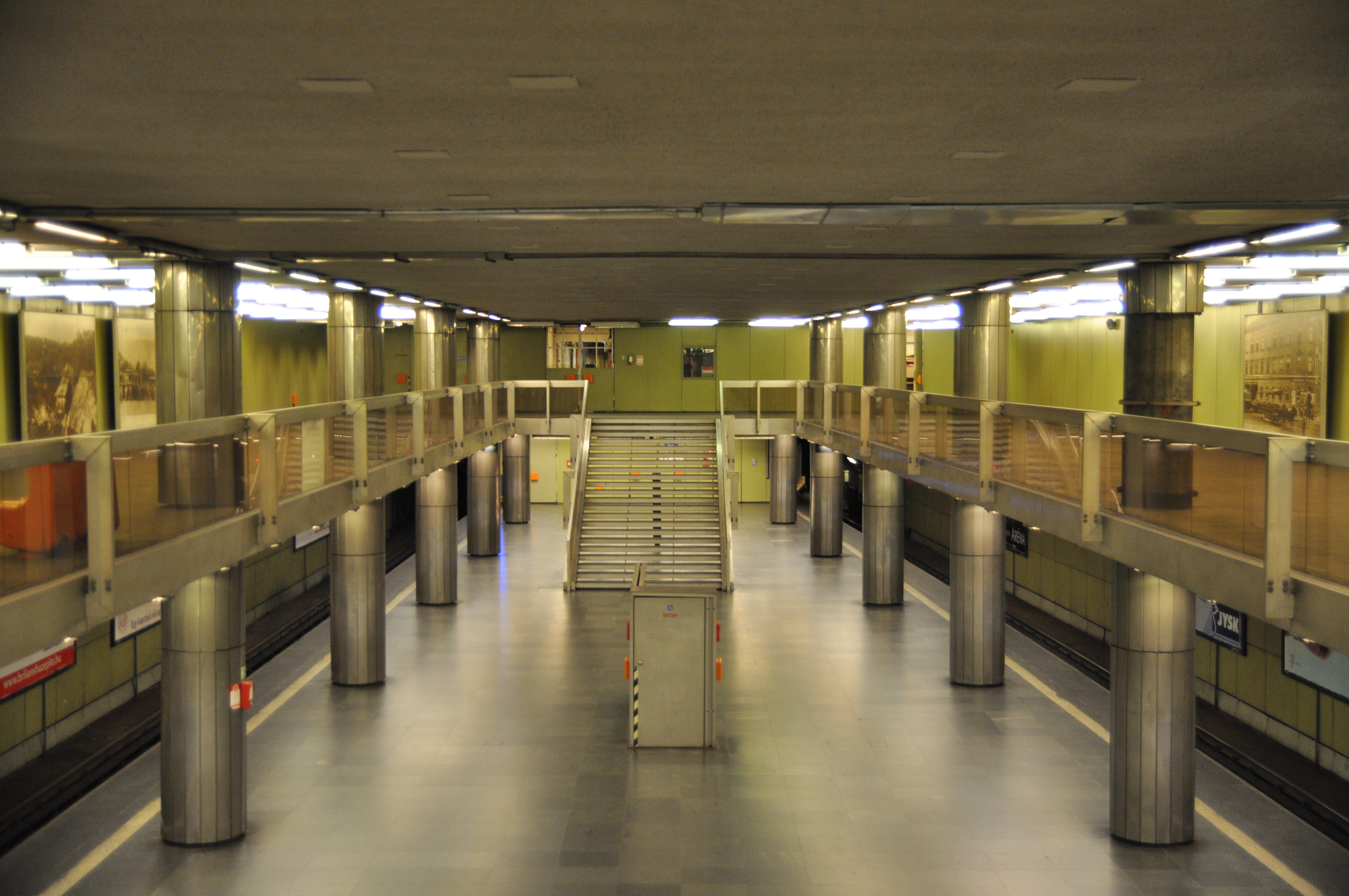
Nagyvárad tér

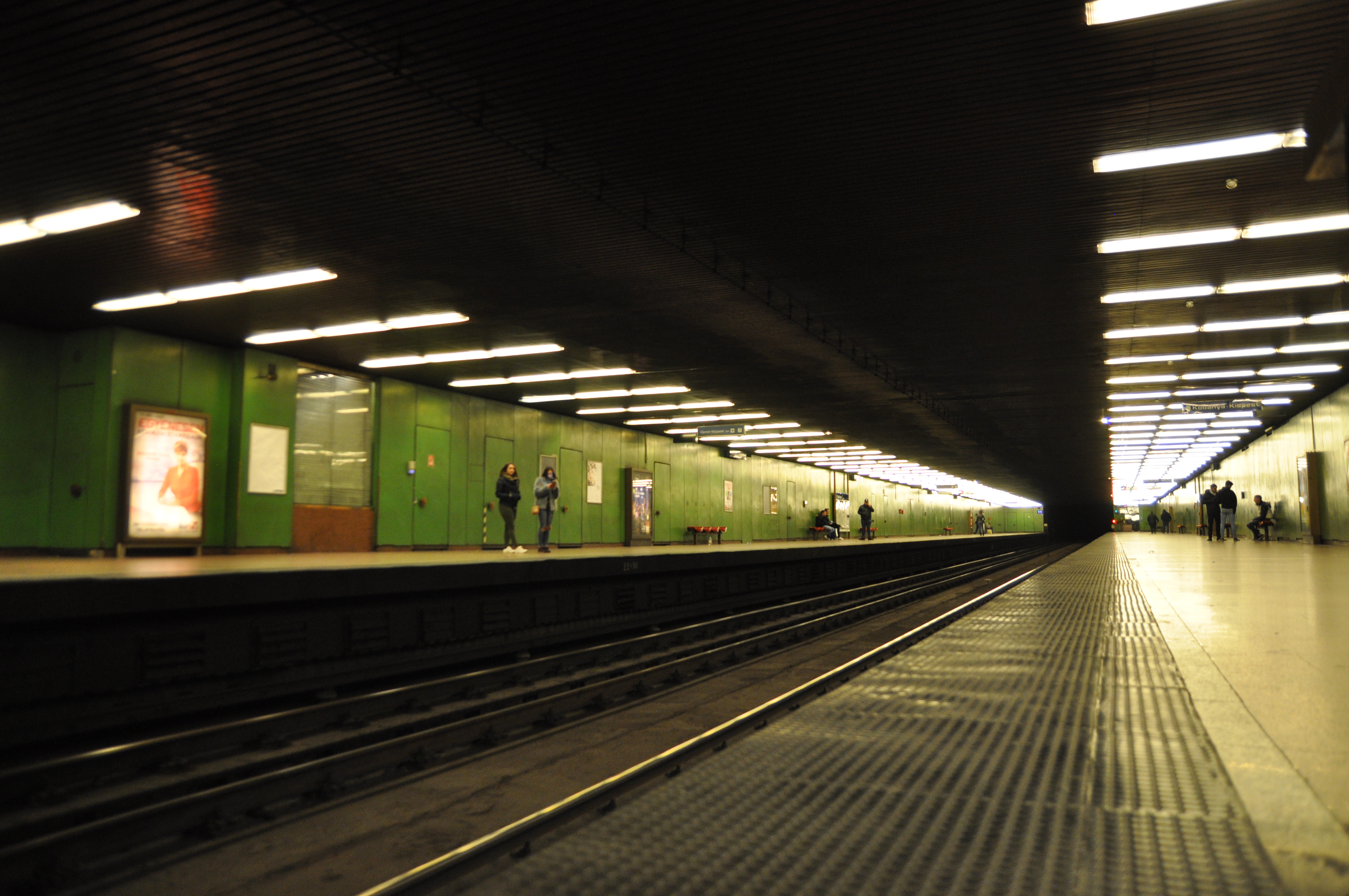
Népliget

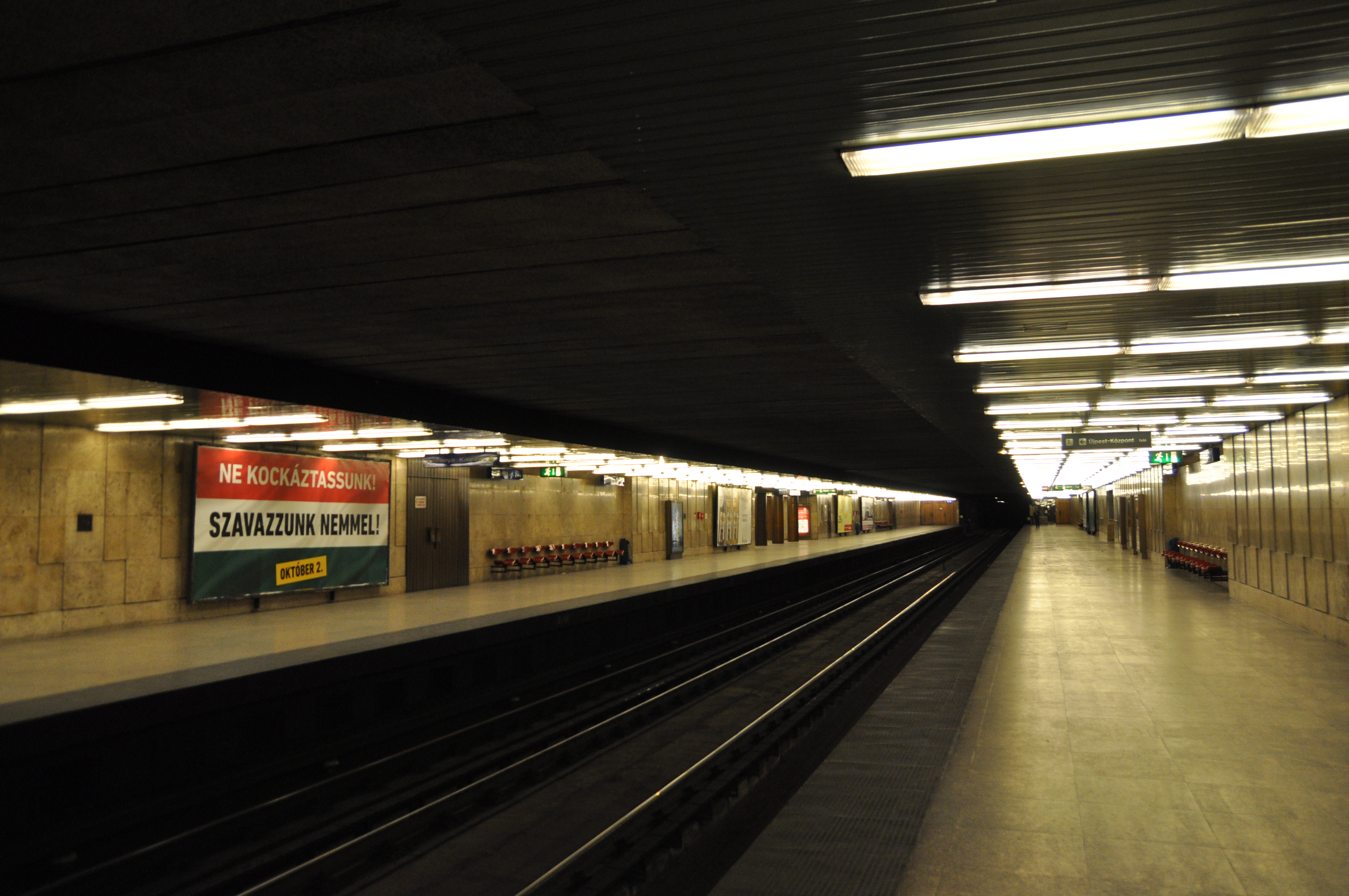
Ecseri út

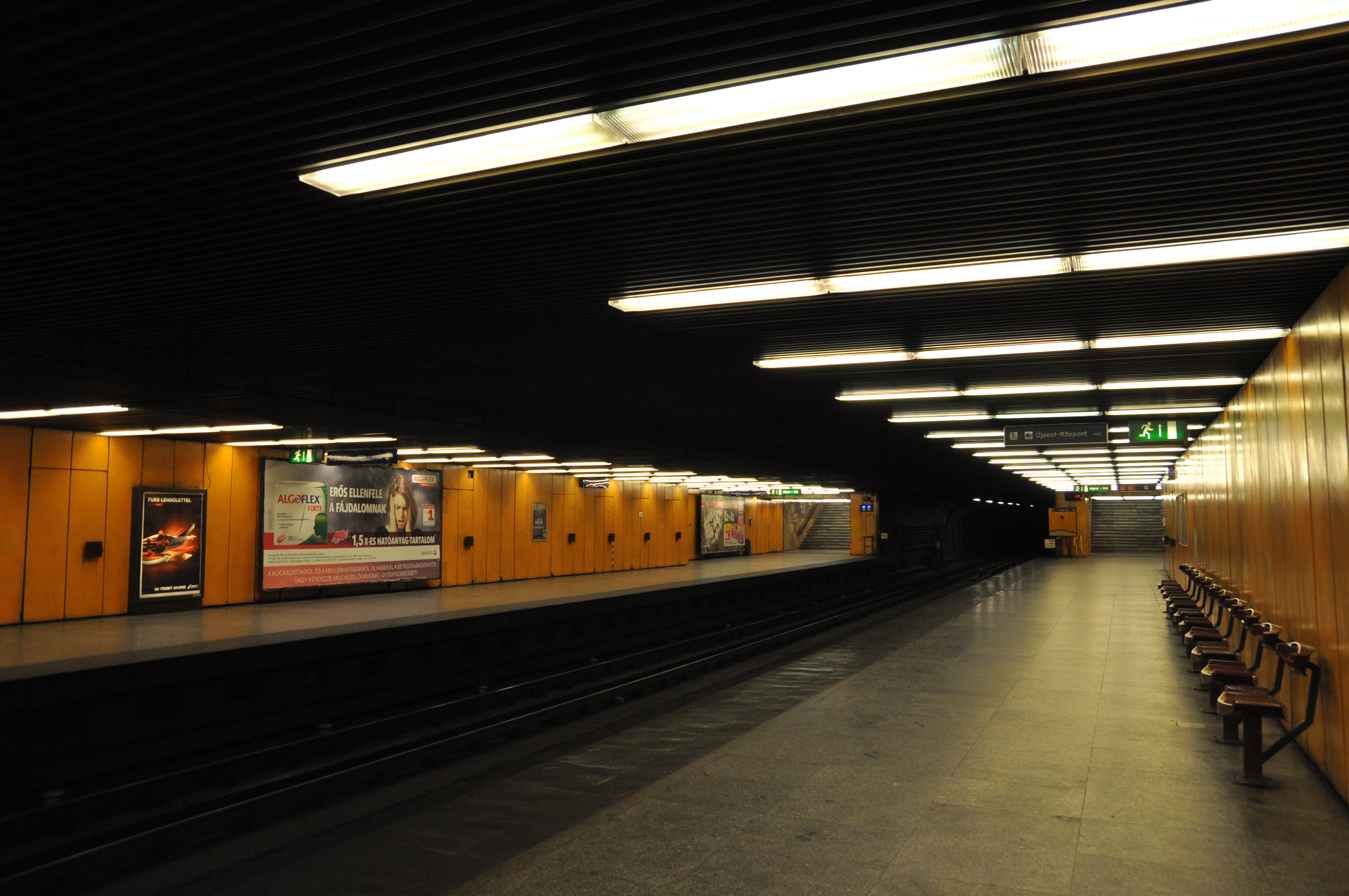
Pöttyös utca

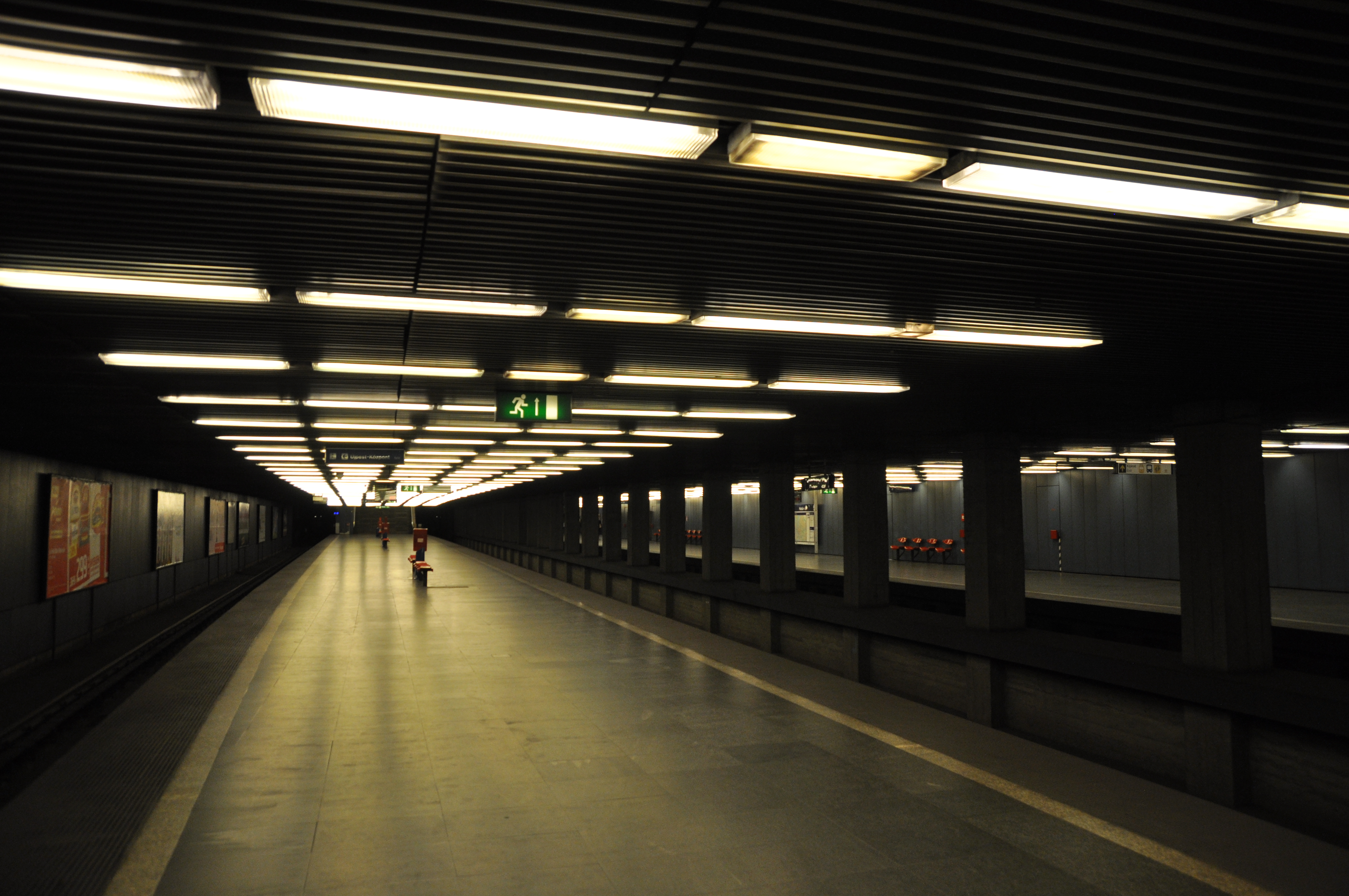
Határ út

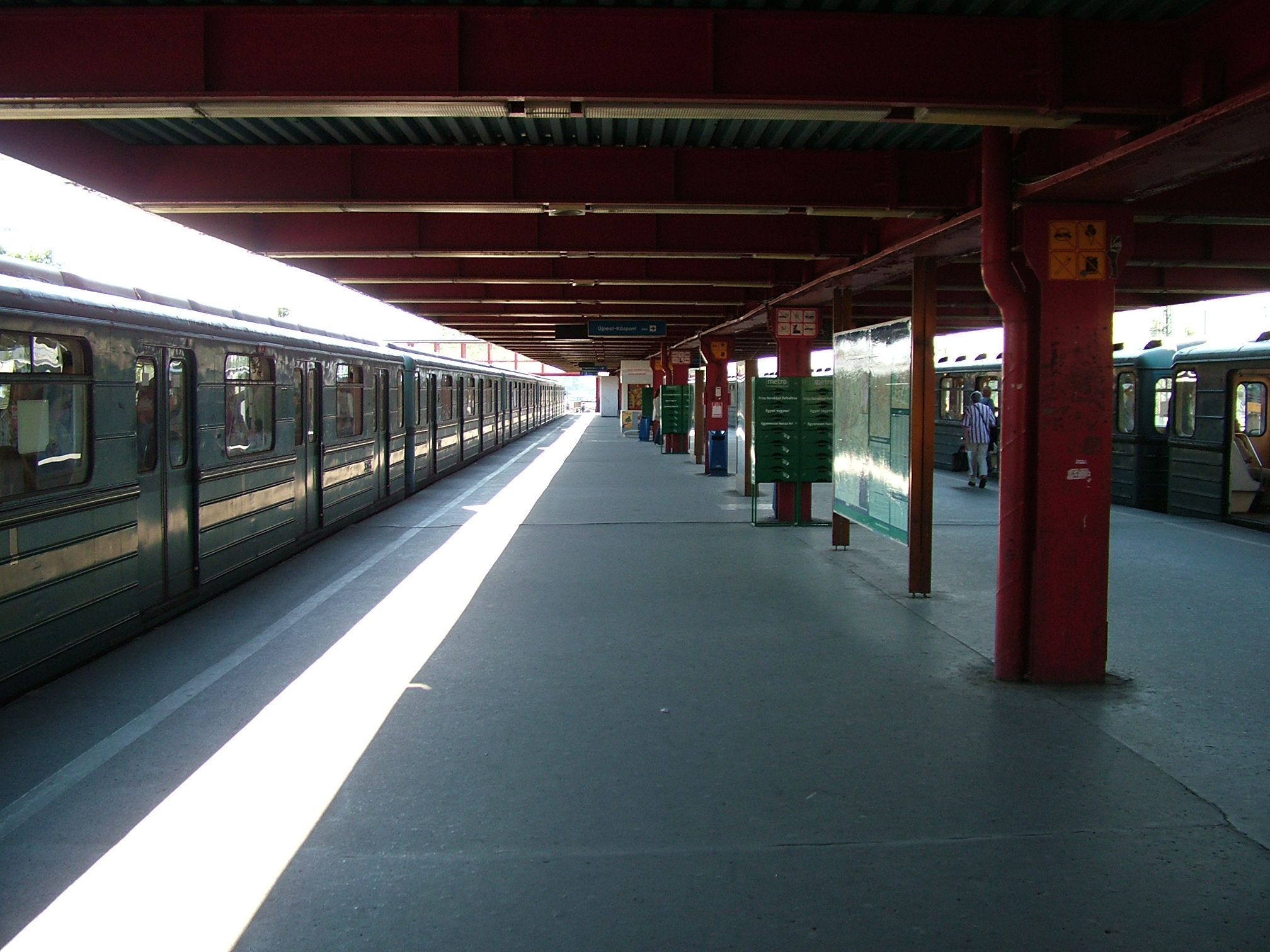
Kőbánya-Kispest

== Gallery about M3 metro stations after the reconstruction ==
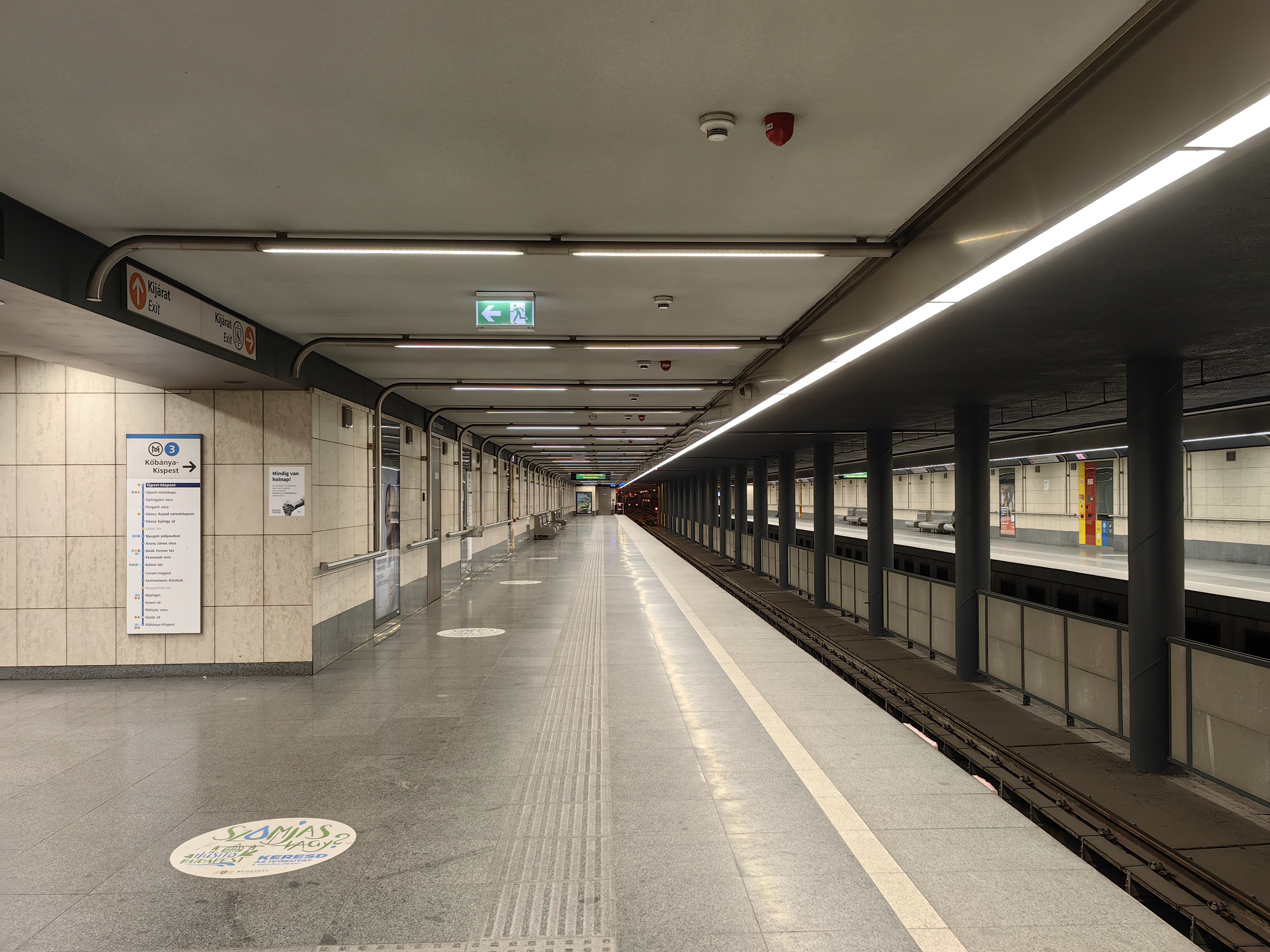
Újpest-központ

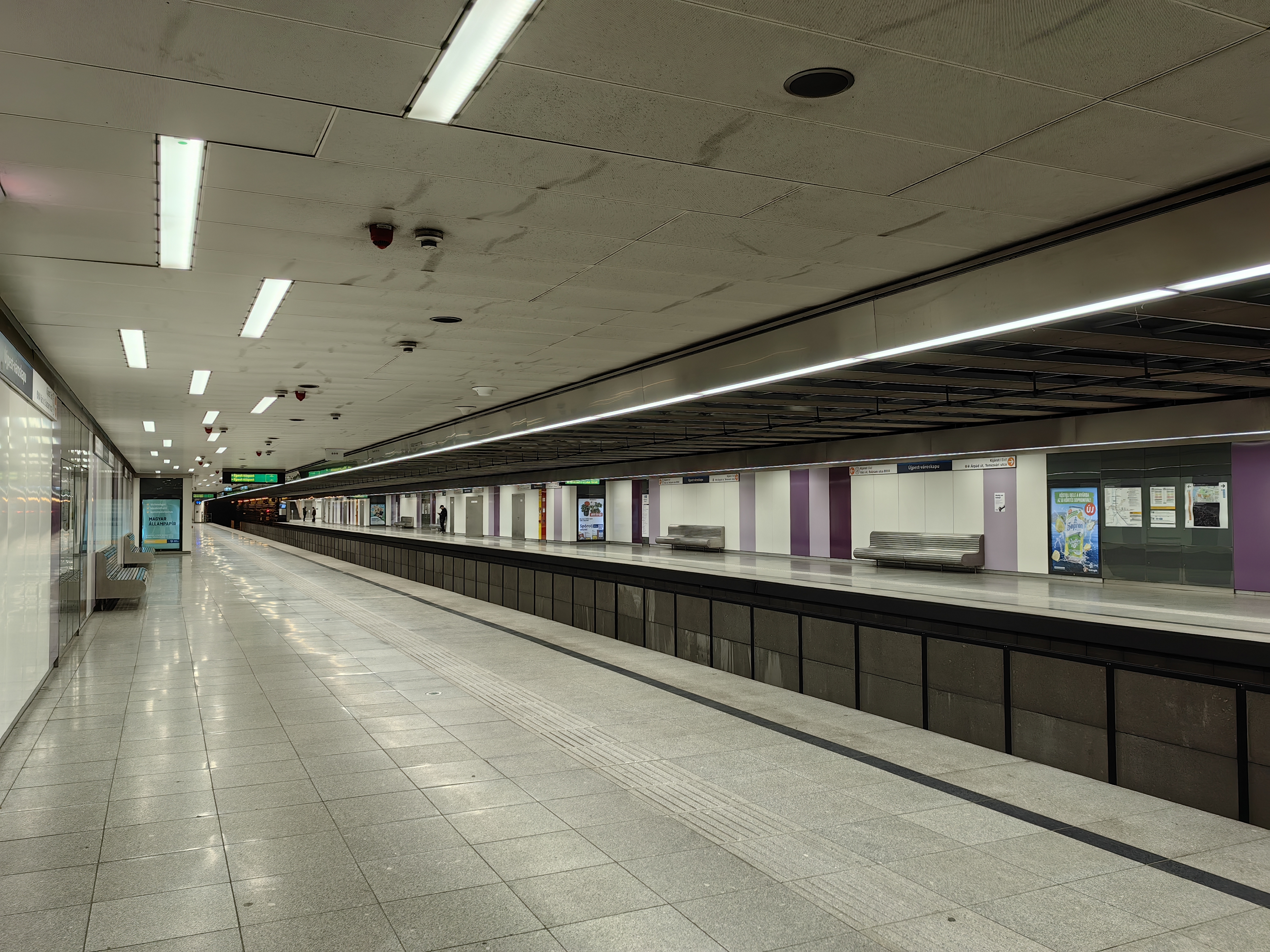
Újpest-városkapu

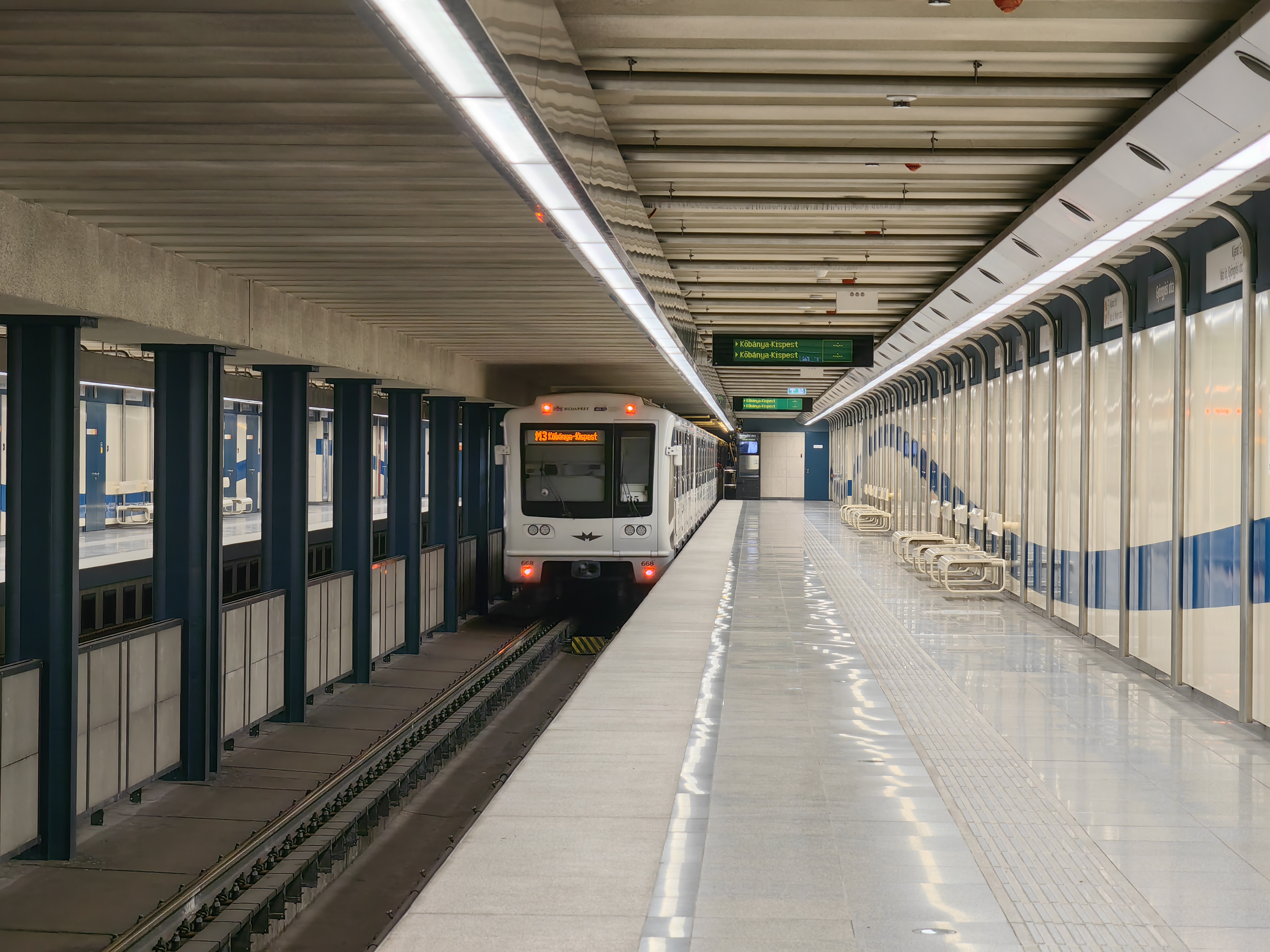
Gyöngyösi utca

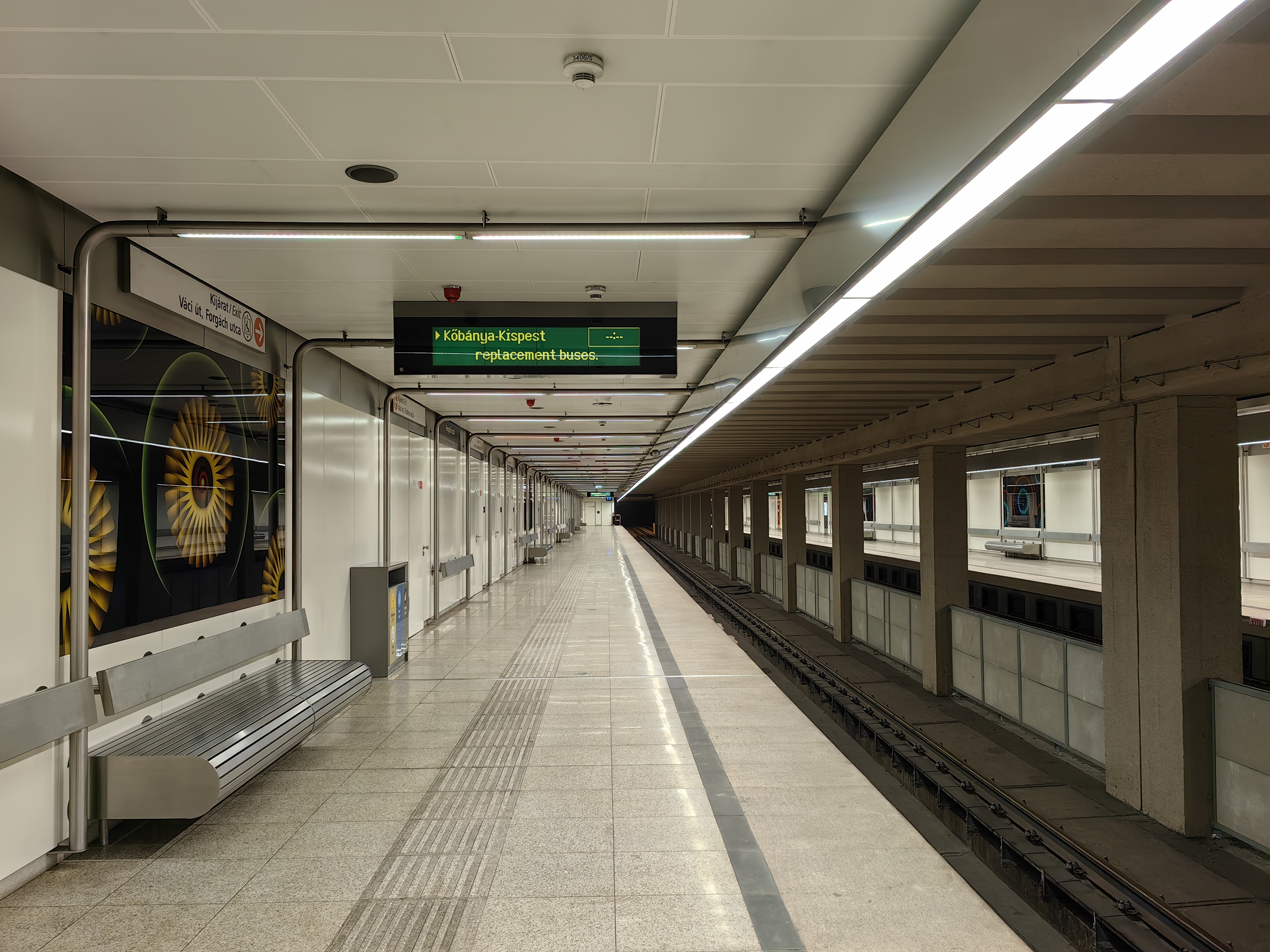
Forgách utca

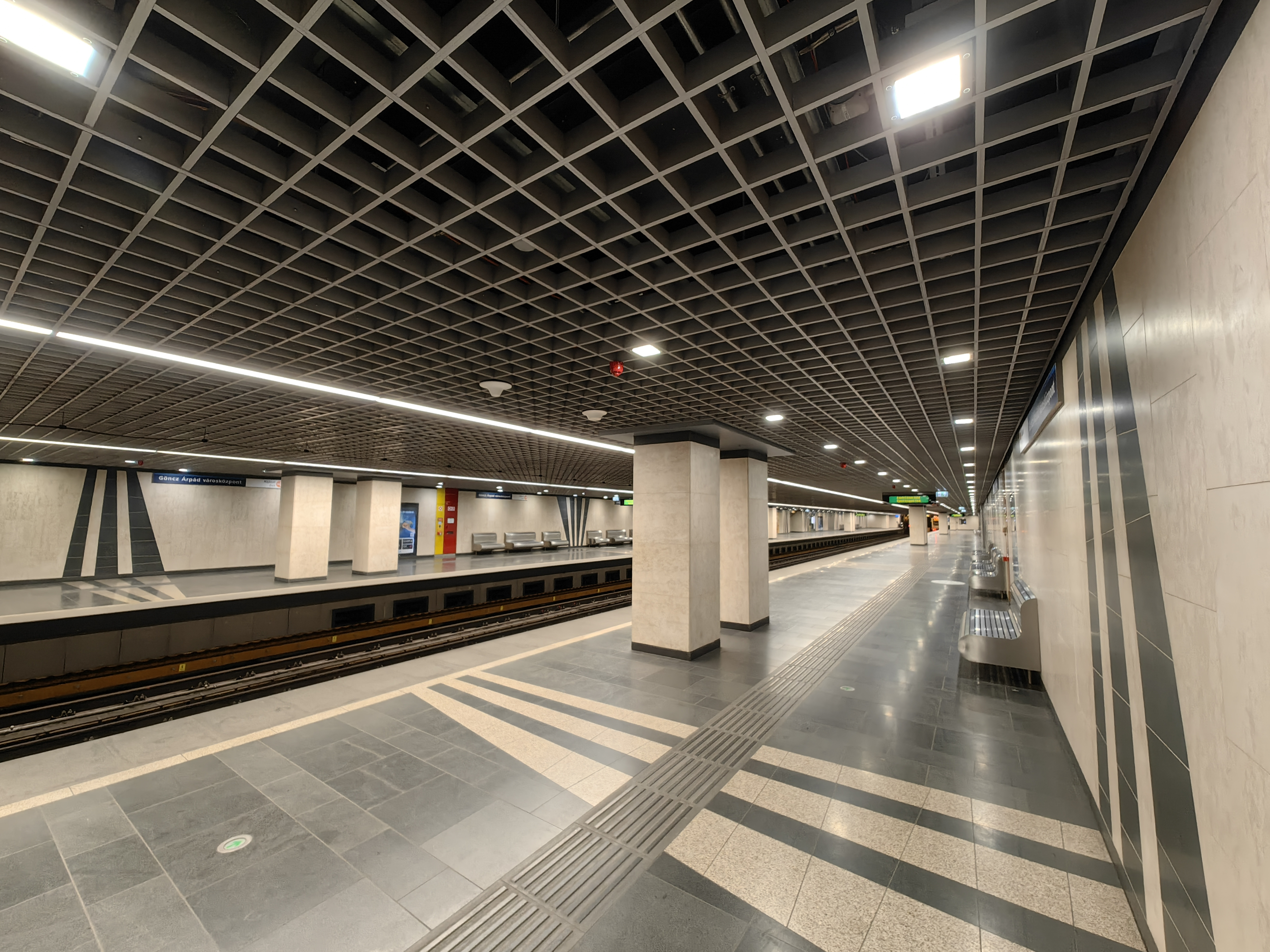
Göncz Árpád városközpont

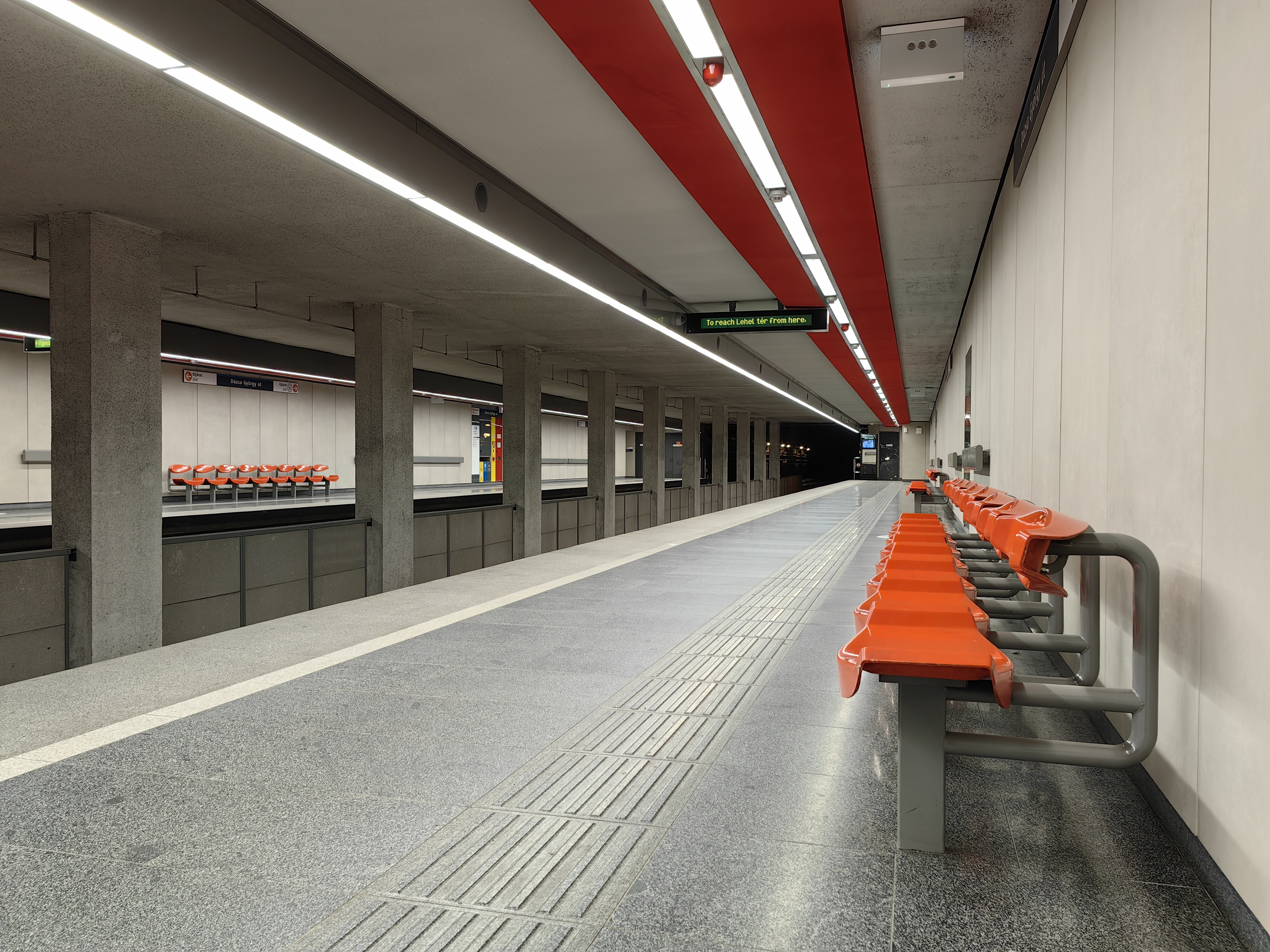
Dózsa György út

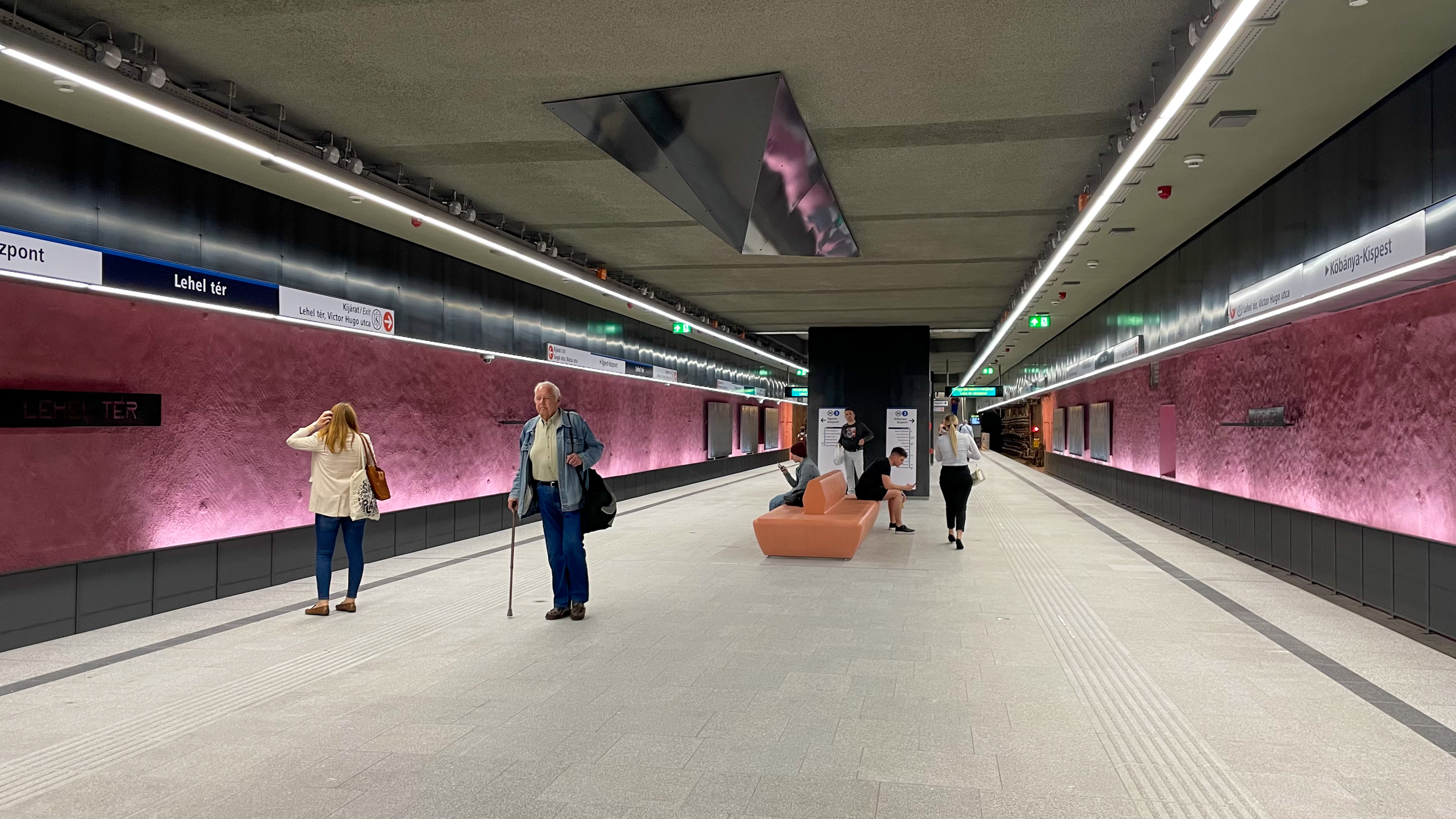
Lehel tér

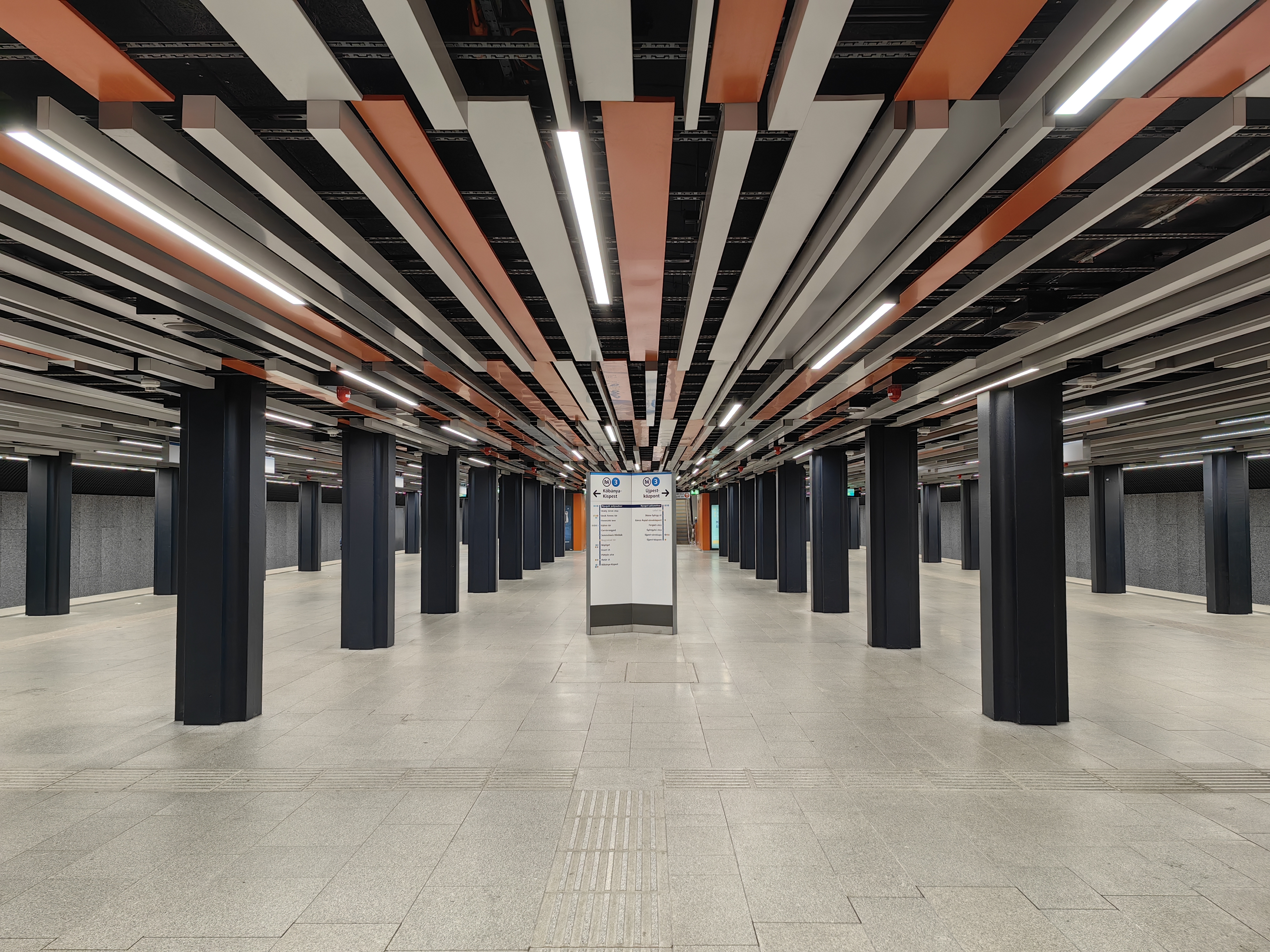
Nyugati pályaudvar

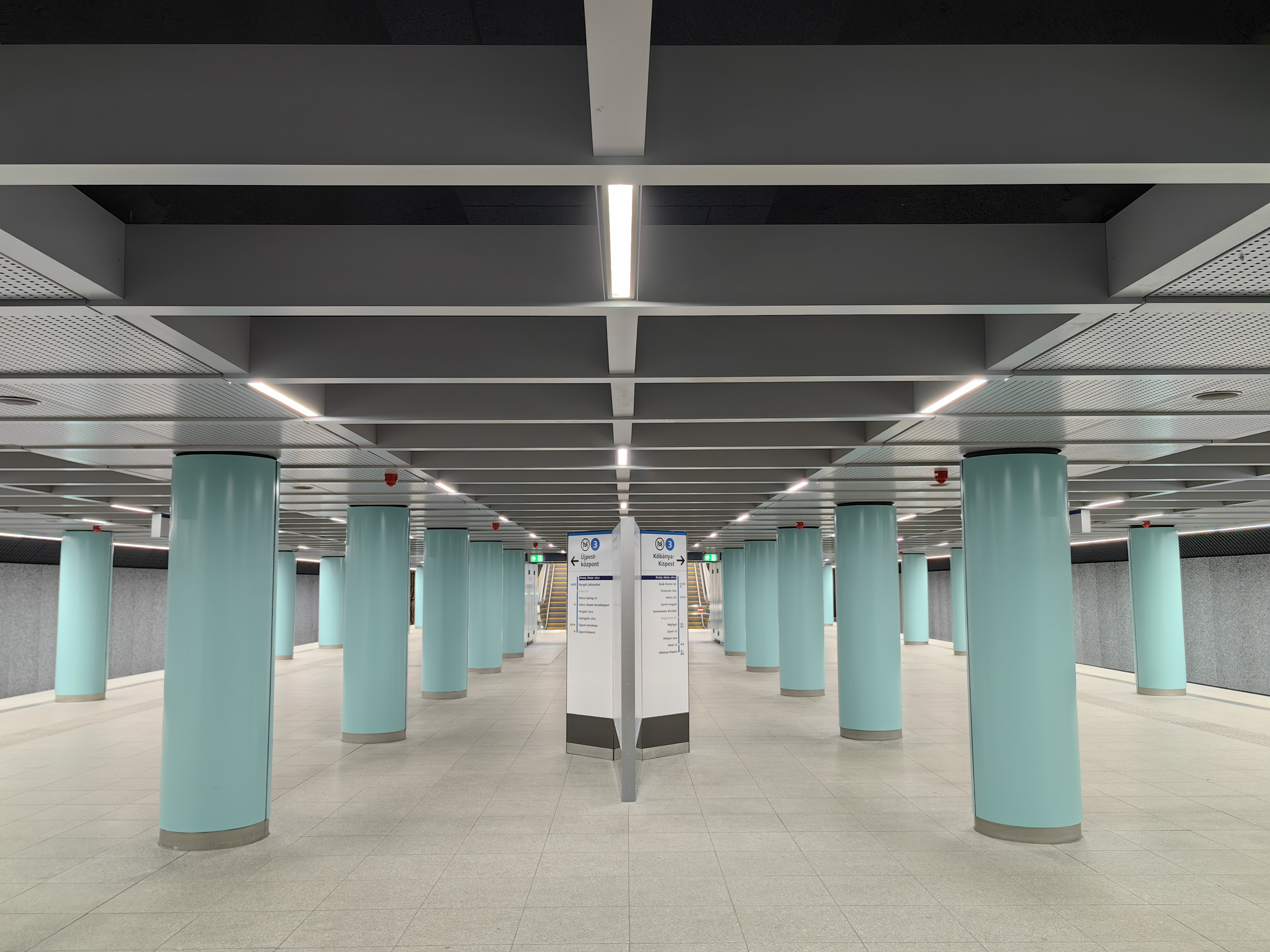
Arany János utca

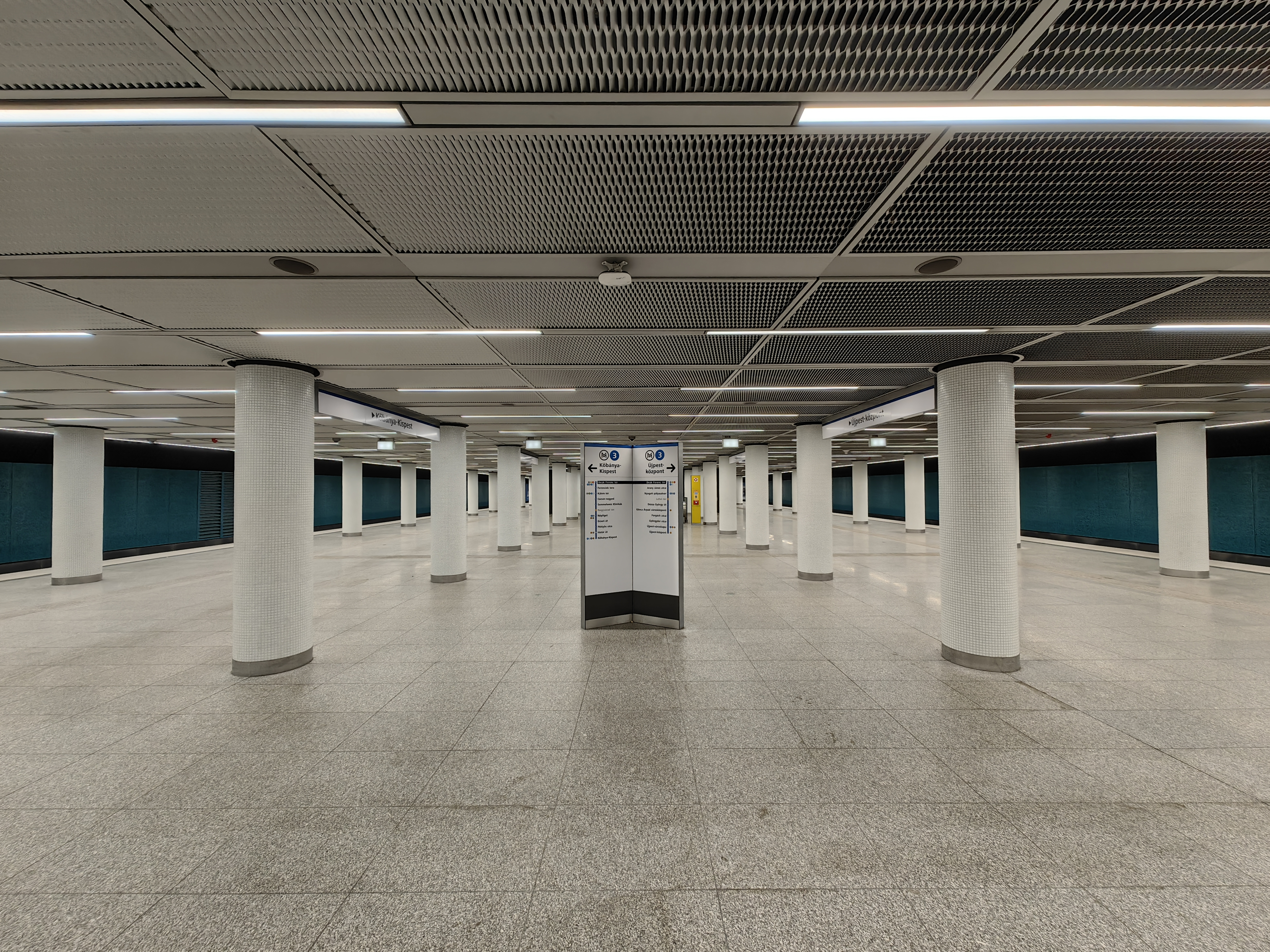
Deák Ferenc tér

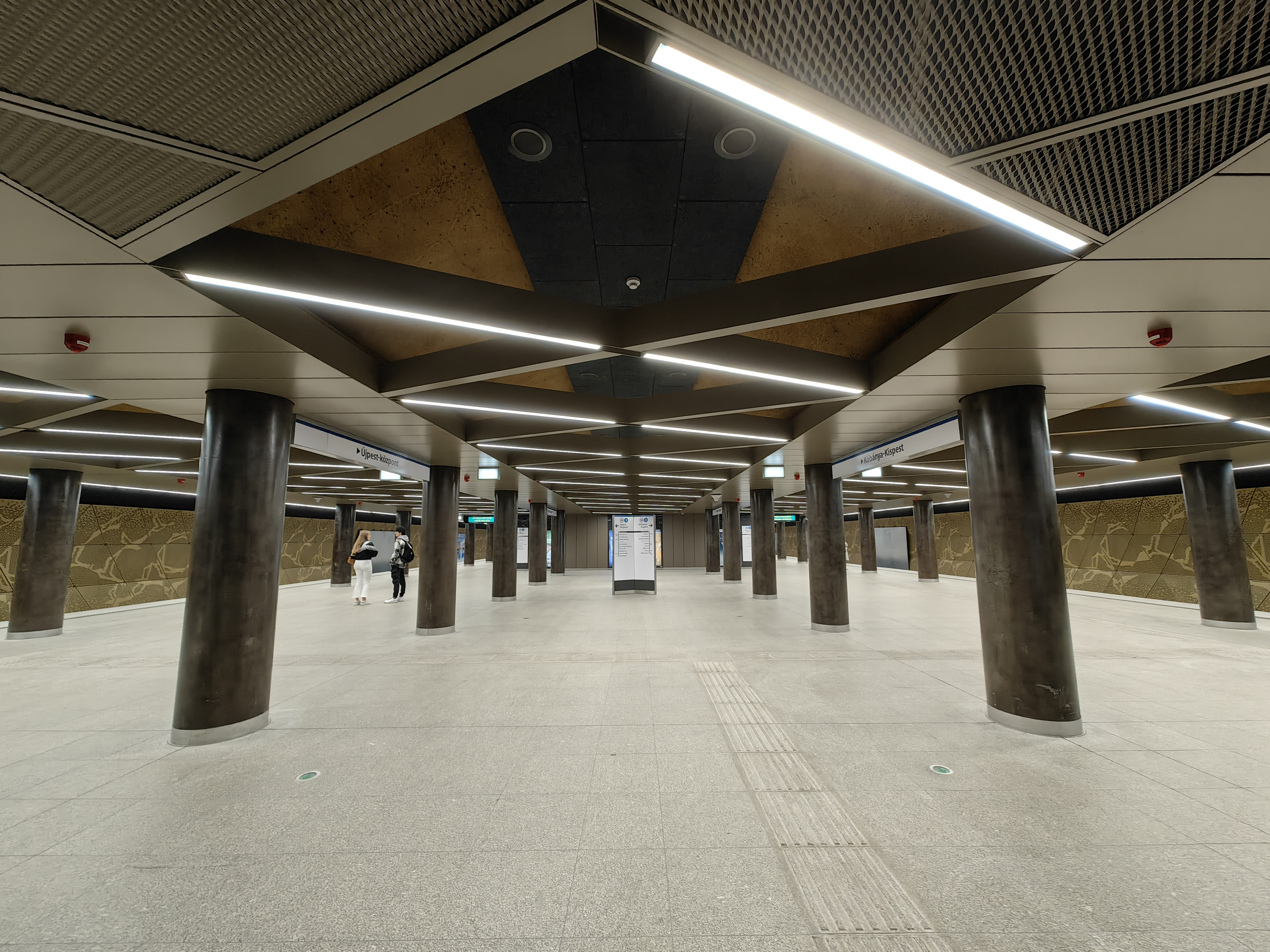
Ferenciek tere

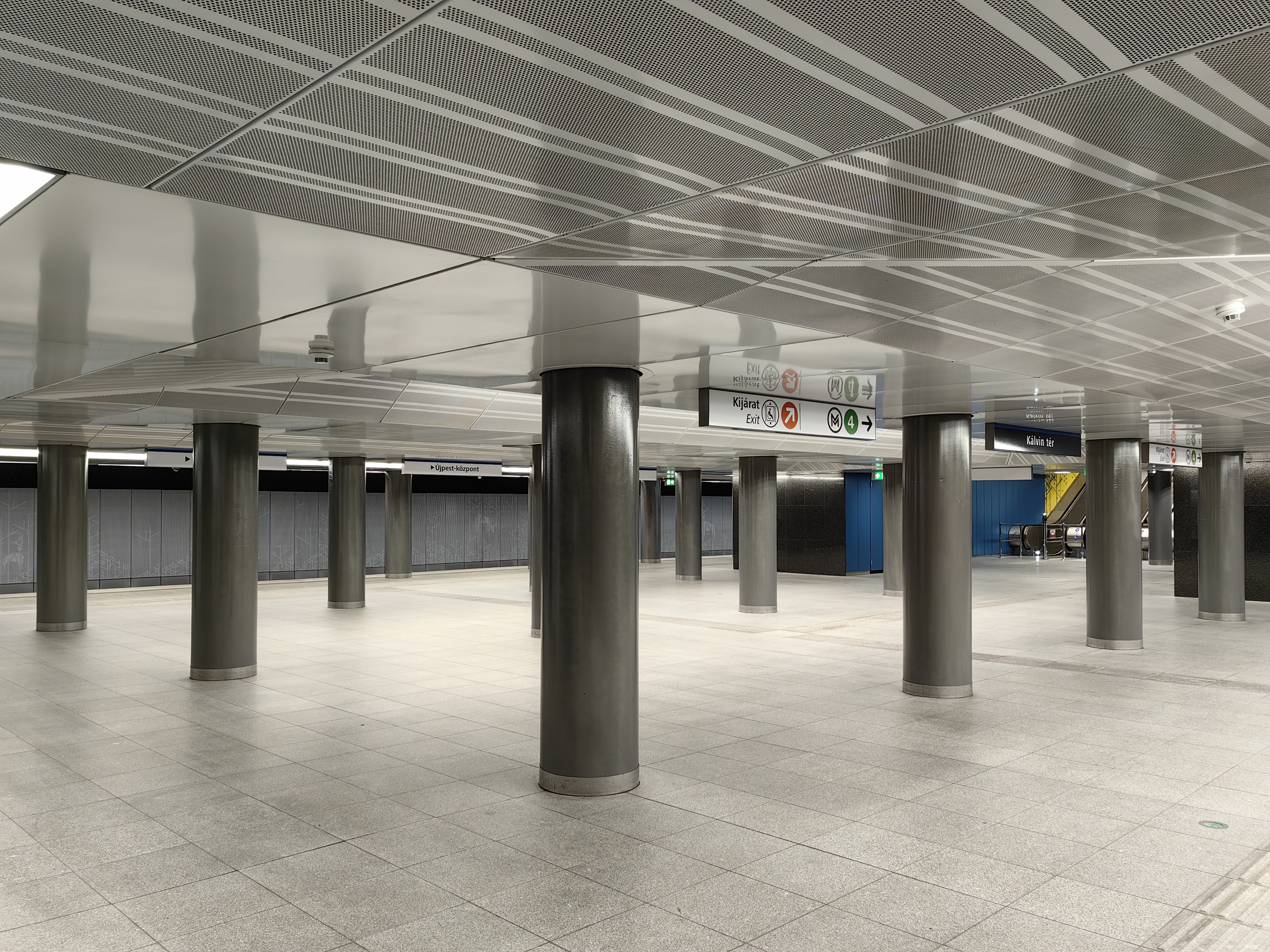
Kálvin tér

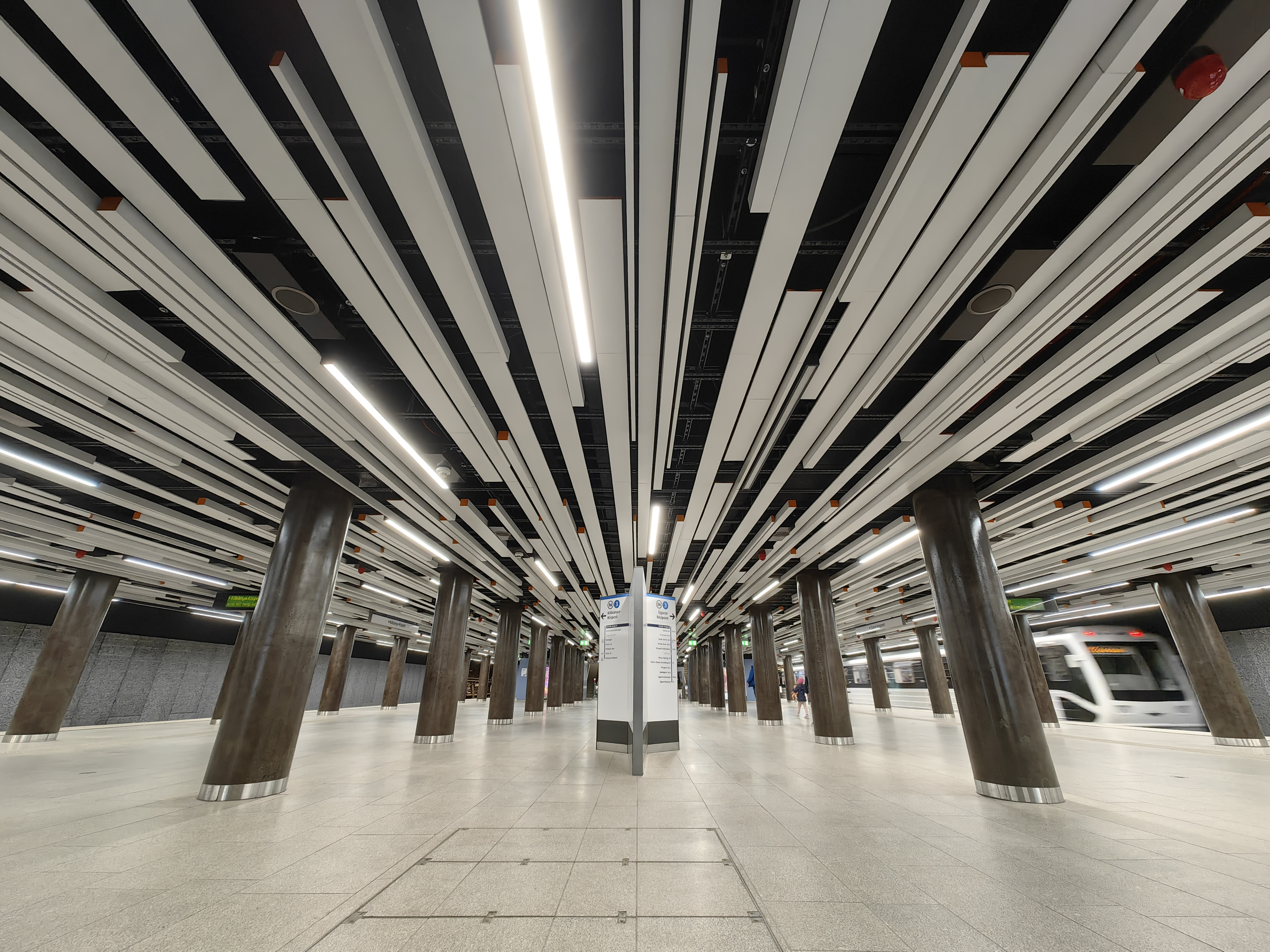
Corvin-negyed

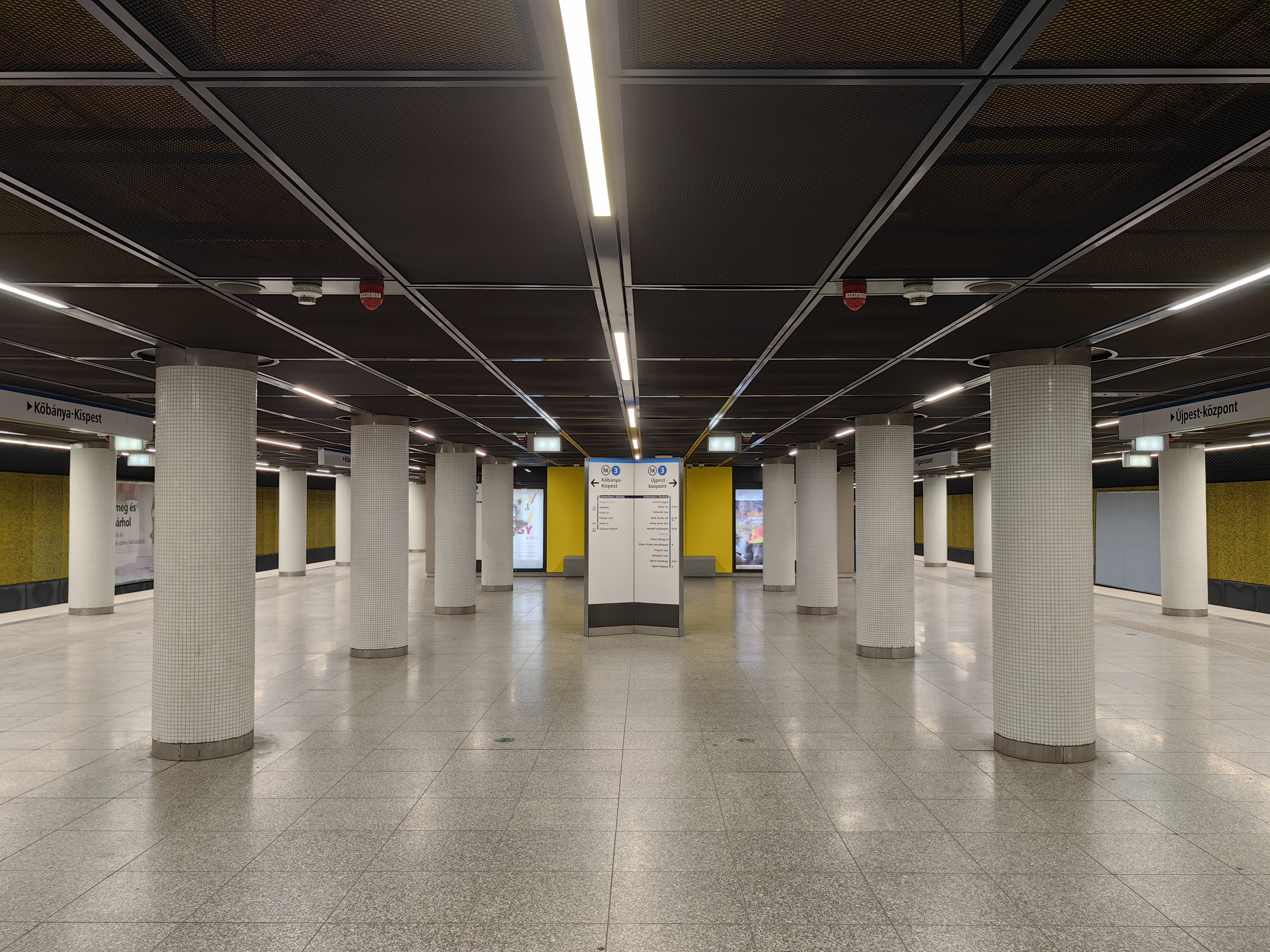
Semmelweis Klinikák

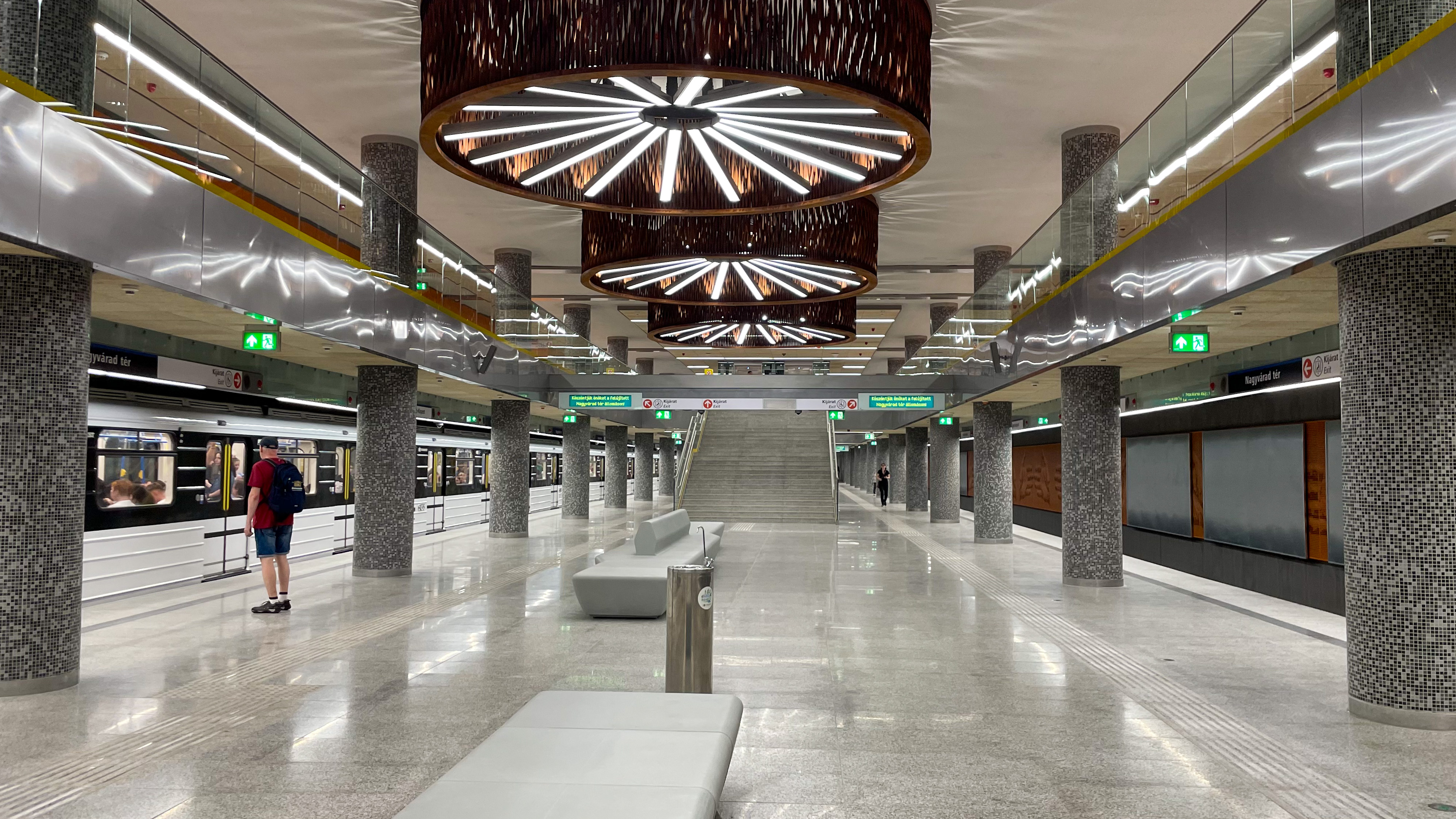
Nagyvárad tér

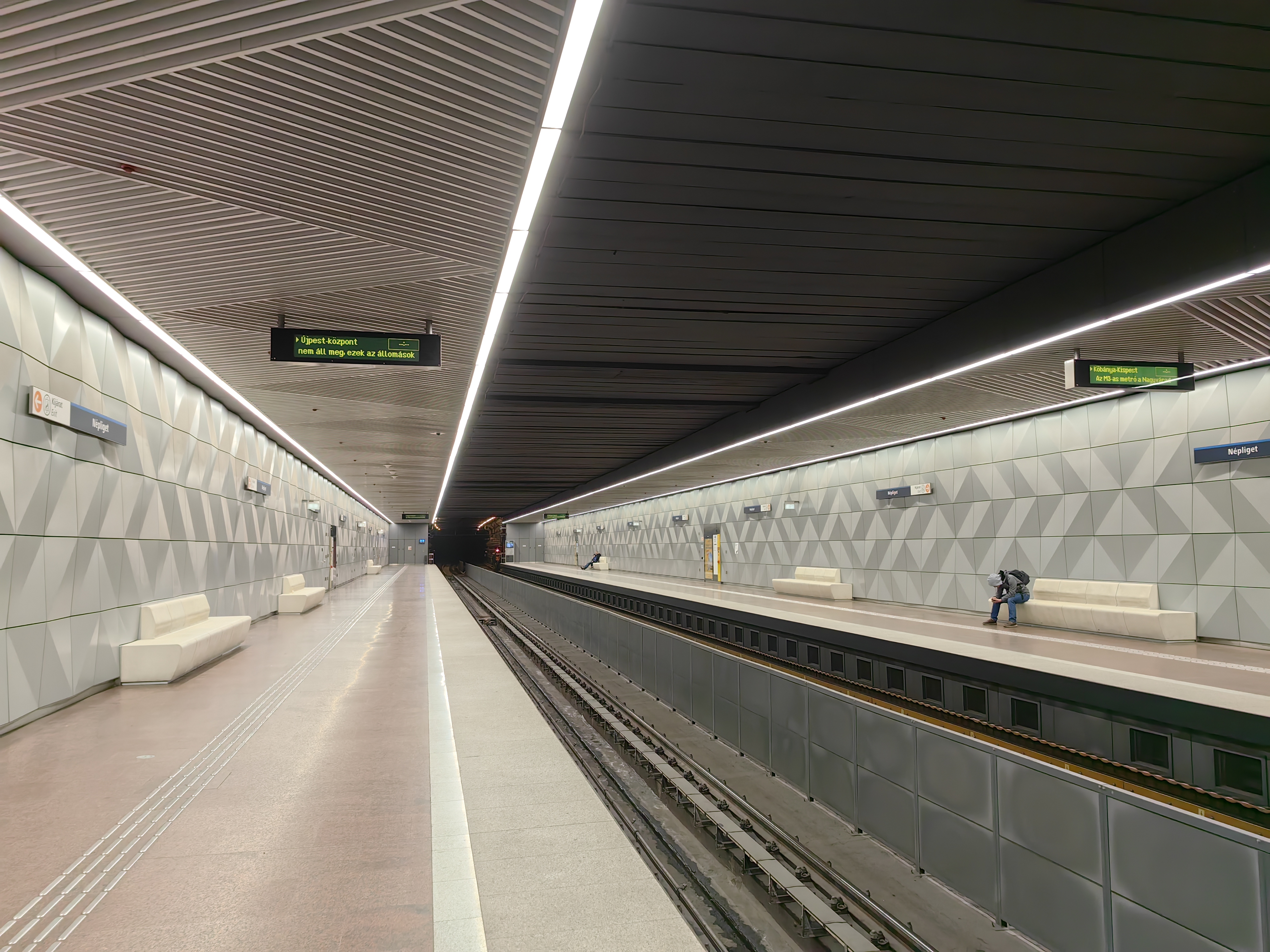
Népliget

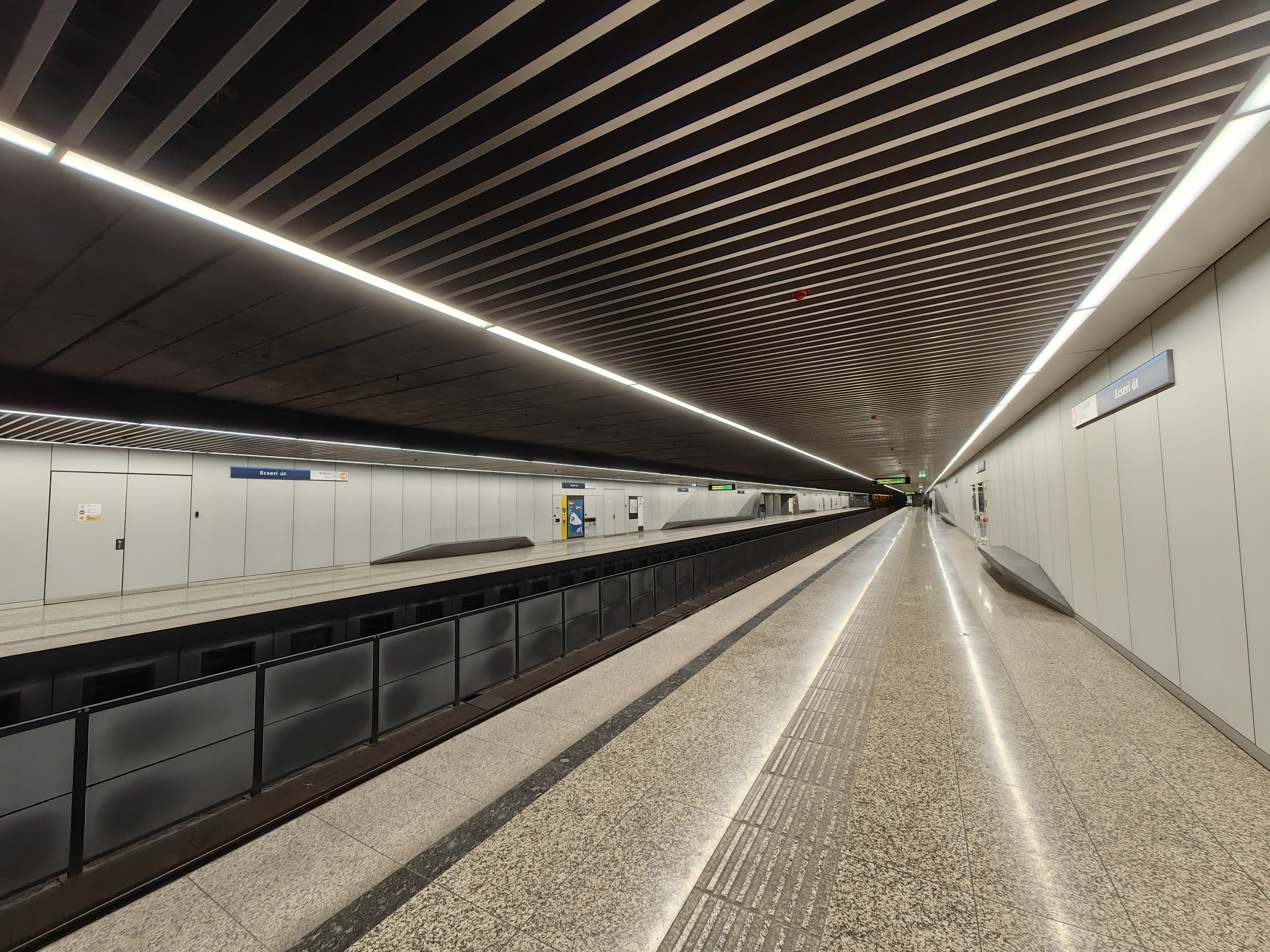
Ecseri út

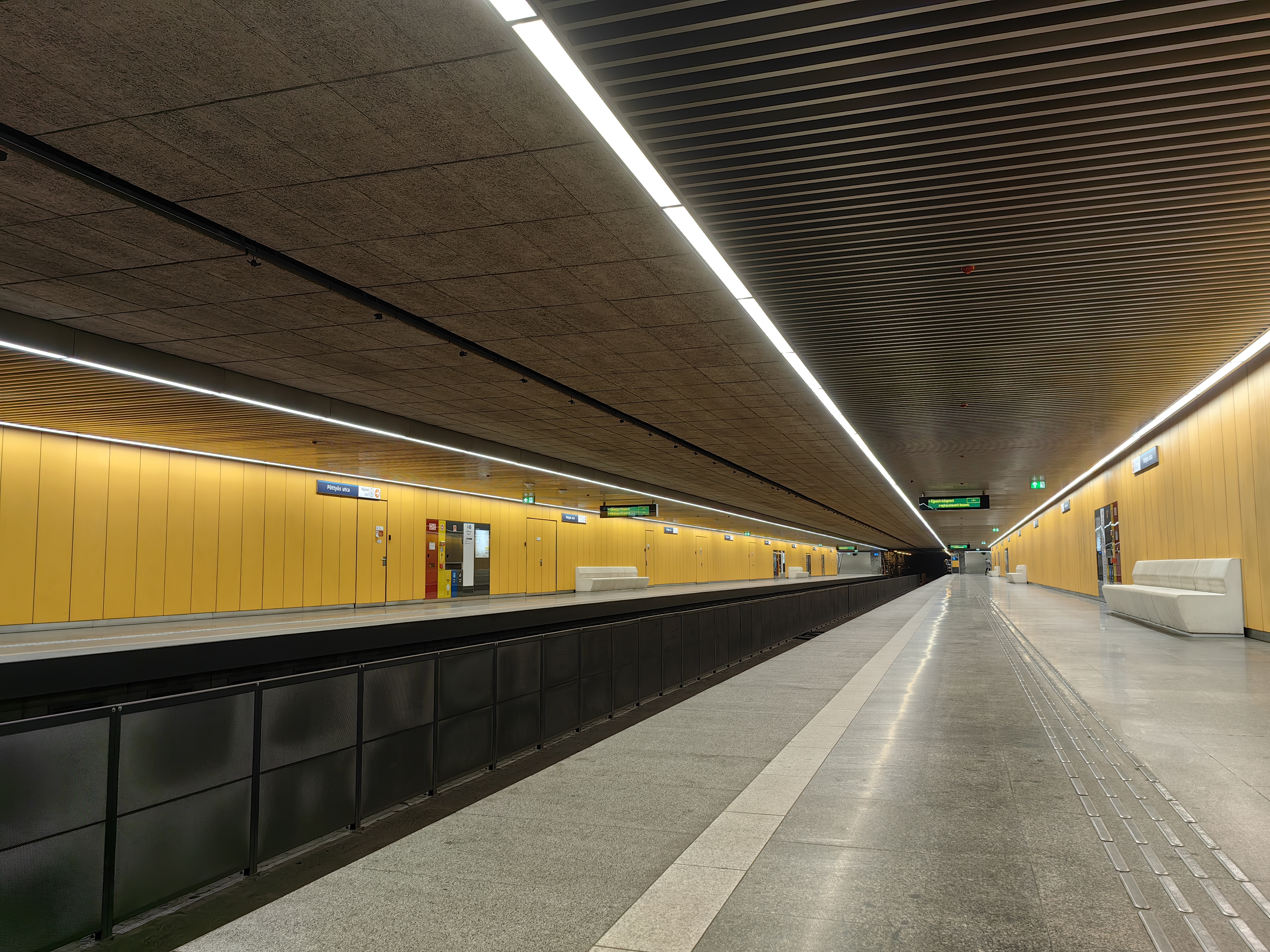
Pöttyös utca

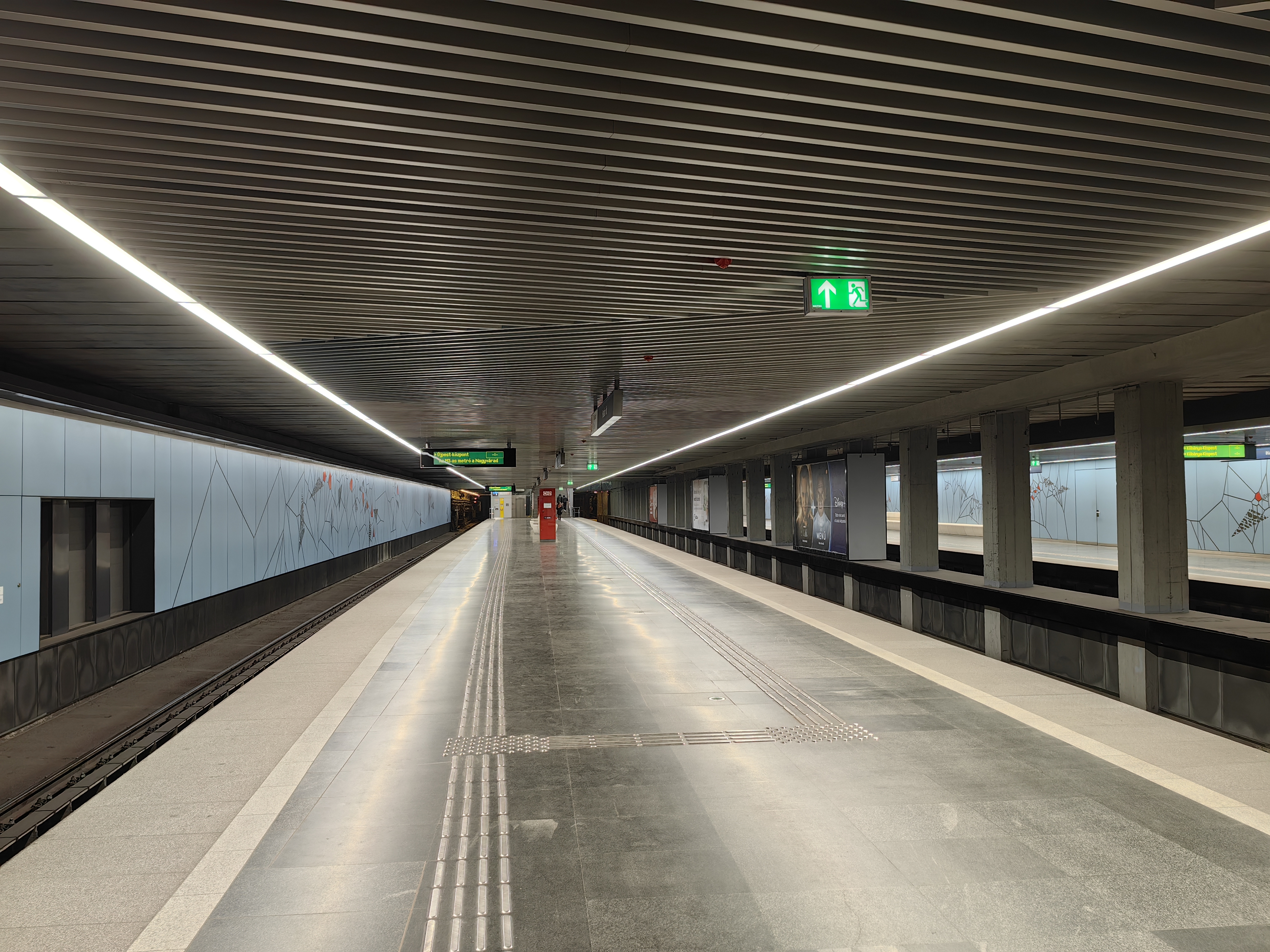
Határ út

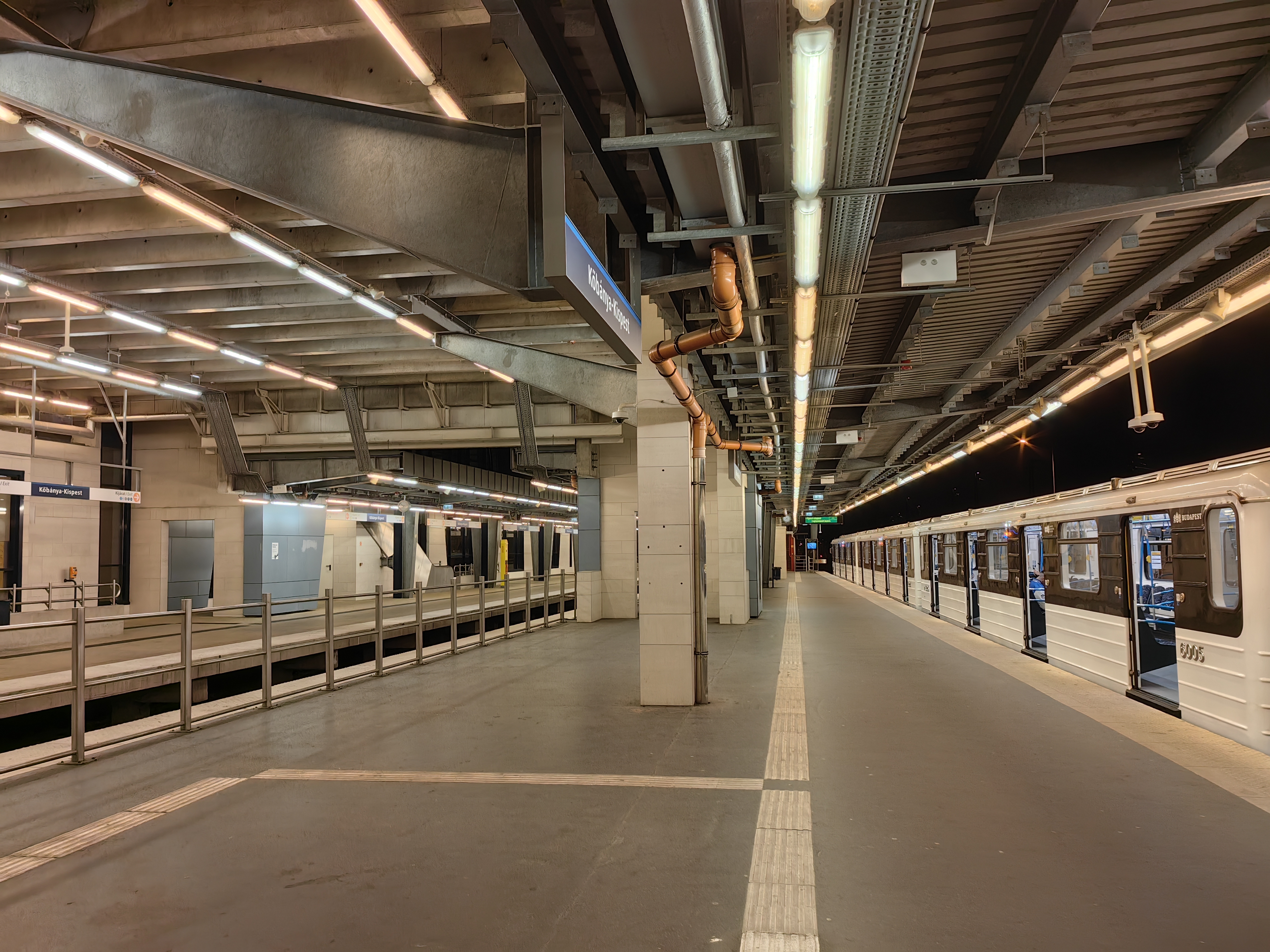
Kőbánya-Kispest
