= Public place names of Budapest =

Budapest is the capital of Hungary. Below is a list of public place names of Budapest that refer to famous people, cities or historic events. Generality of Budapest's public place names relate to the Hungarian national history. In Budapest there are about 8,600 named public place (streets, squares, parks etc.).

== Notable people ==
- András Áchim, Hungarian peasant politician
- Konrad Adenauer, German chancellor
- Endre Ady, Hungarian poet
- Dürer Ajtósi, Hungarian-German painter
- High Prince Álmos, ancient Hungarian leader, father of Árpád
- Gyula Andrássy, Hungarian statesman, see: Andrássy út
- István Angyal, Freedom fighter of the Hungarian revolution of 1956
- János Apáczai Csere, Hungarian writer and pedagogue
- Vilmos Apor, bishop, Righteous among the Nations
- János Arany, Hungarian poet, see: Arany János utca
- Árpád, ancient Hungarian leader, "father of the Hungarians", see: Árpád híd
- Kemal Atatürk, statesman of Turkey
- Attila, king of the Huns
- Lajos Aulich, Minister of War during Hungarian revolution of 1848
- Mihály Babits, Hungarian poet
- Endre Bajcsy-Zsilinszky, Hungarian anti-fascist politician during World War II, see: Bajcsy-Zsilinszky út
- József Bajza, Hungarian poet, see: Bajza utca
- Bálint Balassi, Hungarian poet
- Gábor Baross, Hungarian statesman
- Béla Bartók, Hungarian composer
- István Báthory, prince of Transylvania
- Lajos Batthyány, The first prime minister of Hungary, see: Batthyány tér
- Sándor Bauer, Hungarian student, victim of the communism
- Ludwig van Beethoven, German composer
- József Bem, Polish general during Hungarian revolution of 1848, national hero
- Gyula Benczúr, Hungarian painter
- Miklós Bercsényi, Kuruc general
- Dániel Berzsenyi, Hungarian poet
- György Bessenyei, Hungarian poet
- Gábor Bethlen, prince of Transylvania
- János Bihari, Hungarian Gypsi musician
- Lujza Blaha, Hungarian actress, see: Blaha Lujza tér
- István Bocskai, prince of Transylvania
- Simón Bolívar, "The Liberator"
- János Bolyai, Hungarian mathematician
- Christopher Columbus, Italian explorer and navigator
- Winston Churchill, prime minister of the UK
- Csaba, mythological King of the Székelys
- Mihály Csokonai Vitéz, Hungarian poet
- János Csonka, Hungarian inventor
- Leonardo da Vinci, Italian polymath
- Jenő Dalnoki, Hungarian footballer
- János Damjanich, general during Hungarian revolution of 1848, national hero
- Ferenc Deák, Hungarian statesman, The Wise Man of the Nation, see: Deák Ferenc tér
- Henrik Dembinszky, Polish general during Hungarian revolution of 1848
- Gyula Derkovits, Hungarian painter
- Arisztid Dessewffy, general during Hungarian revolution of 1848
- Edit Domján, Hungarian actress
- György Dózsa, peasants' revolt leader, see: Dózsa György út
- Antonín Dvořák, Czech composer
- József Eötvös, Hungarian minister and writer
- Ferenc Erkel, Hungarian composer
- Erzsébet, Austro-Hungarian queen, see: Erzsébet híd, Erzsébetváros, Pesterzsébet
- János Esterházy, Hungarian martyr politician
- Lipót Fejér, Hungarian mathematician
- Árpád Feszty, Hungarian painter
- György Fráter, Hungarian statesman
- Áron Gábor, Artillery during Hungarian revolution of 1848, national hero
- Géza Gárdonyi, Hungarian writer
- Giuseppe Garibaldi, Italian military and political figure
- Géza, ancient Hungarian leader
- Gyula, ancient Hungarian leader
- Alfréd Hajós, The first Olympic champion of Hungary
- Nándor Hidegkuti, footballer of the Golden Team, see: Hidegkuti Nándor Stadium
- Victor Hugo, French poet
- János Hunyadi, Hungarian military and political figure
- Gyula Illyés, Hungarian writer
- Mari Jászai, Hungarian actress
- John Paul II, Pope
- Mór Jókai, Hungarian writer
- Attila József, Hungarian poet
- János Kálvin, Protestant theologian, see: Kálvin tér
- Kálmán Kandó, Hungarian engineer
- Frigyes Karinthy, Hungarian poet and journalist
- József Katona, Hungarian playwright and poet
- Ferenc Kazinczy, reformatory of Hungarian language
- Gáspár Károli, Hungarian Calvinist pastor
- Zsigmond Kemény, Hungarian author
- Pál Kinizsi, Hungarian general
- Sándor Kisfaludy, Hungarian poet
- Ernő Kiss, general during Hungarian revolution of 1848
- János Kis, Hungarian lieutenant-general
- György Klapka, general during Hungarian revolution of 1848
- Sándor Kocsis, footballer of the Golden Team
- Lajos Kossuth, Hungarian statesman, regent of Hungary during 1848 Revolution, freedom fighter and national hero, see: Kossuth Lajos tér
- Ferenc Kölcsey, Hungarian poet
- Lehel, ancient Hungarian leader, see: Lehel tér
- Károly Leiningen-Westerburg, general during Hungarian revolution of 1848
- Ferenc Liszt, Hungarian composer, see: Budapest Ferenc Liszt International Airport
- Károly Lotz, Hungarian-German painter
- Imre Madách, Hungarian writer
- Péter Mansfeld, freedom fighter during Hungarian revolution of 1956
- Margit, saint, daughter of king Béla IV of Hungary, see: Margit-sziget, Margit híd
- Mária, mother of Jesus
- Ignác Martinovics, Hungarian Jacobin leader
- Mátyás király, king of Hungary
- Kelemen Mikes, Hungarian political figure and essayist
- Kálmán Mikszáth, Hungarian writer
- Ferenc Molnár, Hungarian writer
- Ferenc Móra, Hungarian writer
- Zsigmond Móricz, Hungarian writer, see: Móricz Zsigmond körtér
- Mihály Munkácsy, Hungarian painter
- Imre Nagy, prime minister of Hungary during Hungarian revolution of 1956
- Lajos Nagy, king of Hungary
- József Nagysándor, general during Hungarian revolution of 1848
- László Németh, Hungarian writer
- János Neumann, Hungarian mathematician
- Pál Nyáry, politician during Hungarian revolution of 1848
- Ond vezér, ancient Hungarian leader
- Balázs Orbán, Hungarian writer
- Olof Palme, Swedish social-democrat politician
- Örs vezér, ancient Hungarian leader, see: Örs vezér tere
- Péter Pázmány, Hungarian theologist
- Mór Perczel, general during Hungarian revolution of 1848
- Sándor Petőfi, national poet of Hungary, freedom fighter and national hero, see: Petőfi híd
- Frigyes Podmaniczky, Hungarian politician, developer of Budapest (avenues, boulevards, bridges etc.)
- Mihály Pollack, Austro-Hungarian architect
- Ernő Pöltenberg, general during Hungarian revolution of 1848
- Elvis Presley, American singer
- Ferenc Puskás, footballer of the Golden Team, see: Puskás Ferenc Stadium
- Miklós Radnóti, Hungarian poet
- Ferenc Rákóczi, Hungarian Kuruc leader
- József Rippl-Rónai, Hungarian painter
- Lipót Rottenbiller, mayor of Pest
- Ignác Semmelweis, Hungarian physician
- Imre Sinkovits, Hungarian actor
- János Sobieski, king of Poland
- Aurél Stromfeld, staff officer of the Hungarian Soviet Republic
- Ervin Szabó, Hungarian social scientist
- Lőric Szabó, Hungarian poet
- István Széchenyi, Hungarian statesman, "The greatest Hungarian"
- Bertalan Szemere, prime minister of Hungary
- Hannah Szenes, Hungarian poet
- Szent Adalbert, master of Stephen I of Hungary
- Szent Benedek, Christian saint
- Szent Gellért, Christian saint, see: Gellérthegy
- Szent György, Christian saint
- Szent Imre, son of Stephen I of Hungary
- Szent István, the first king of Hungary, founder of Hungary (1000–1001)
- Szent János, Christian saint
- Szent József, father of Jesus
- Szent Kristóf, Christian saint
- Szent László, king of Hungary
- Szent Orbán, Christian saint
- Dezső Szilágyi, Hungarian jurist and politician
- Erzsébet Szilágyi, mother of Matthias Corvinus of Hungary
- József Simándy, Hungarian tenor
- Pál Szinyei Merse, Hungarian painter
- Mihály Táncsics, Hungarian poet and politician
- Vilmos Tartsay, Hungarian anti-fascist general during World War II
- Blanka Teleki, Hungarian early feminist
- László Teleki, Hungarian writer and politician
- Edward Teller, Hungarian physysist
- Kálmán Thaly, Hungarian poet
- Imre Thököly, Hungarian Kuruc leader
- Sebestyén Tinódi Lantos, Hungarian lyricist
- Ferenc Toldy, Hungarian literary historian
- Leo Tolstoy, Russian writer
- Árpád Tóth, Hungarian poet
- István Türr, Hungarian freedom fighter
- Vak Bottyán, Hungarian Kuruc general
- Gereben Vas, Hungarian poet and writer
- Pál Vasvári, Hungarian freedom fighter during Hungarian revolution of 1848
- Mihály Vörösmarty, Hungarian poet
- Raul Wallenberg, Swedish humanitarian
- Albert Wass, Hungarian writer
- Miklós Wesselényi, Hungarian statesman
- József Zakariás, footballer of the Golden Team
- György Zala, Hungarian architect
- Mihály Zichy, Hungarian painter
- Miklós Zrínyi, Hungarian poet and general
- This list is not complete, it consists only the most notable people and the most common public place names.
- This list is in Hungarian alphabetical order!

== Others ==
- Akácfa (wattle tree)
- Akácos (wattle wood)
- Alkotmány (Constitution)
- Állomás (train station)
- Anna (given name for girls)
- Apahida (former Hungarian village)
- Aradi (former Hungarian city)
- Bácskai (Hungarian land)
- Balatoni (Hungarian lake)
- Bánya (mine)
- Bártfa (former Hungarian city)
- Bécsi (Wiener)
- Béke (peace)
- Beregszász (former Hungarian city)
- Botond (Hungarian given name for boys)
- Brassó (former Hungarian city)
- Cica (kitten)
- Csallóköz (ethnic Hungarian land)
- Csap (former Hungarian city)
- Csíksomlyó (former Hungarian village)
- Csillag (star)
- Csongor (Hungarian given name for boys)
- Diófa (nut tree)
- Duna (Danube)
- Eperjes (former Hungarian city)
- Erdélyi (former Hungarian land)
- Erőmű (power plant)
- Érsekújvár (former Hungarian city)
- Fátra (former Hungarian mountains)
- Fecske (swallow)
- Felsőbánya (former Hungarian city)
- Fenyves (pine-grove)
- Fiume (former Hungarian city)
- Fogaras (former Hungarian city)
- Fő (Main, for ex.: Main street, Main square)
- Füredi (Hungarian city)
- Garam (former Hungarian river)
- Garázs (garage)
- Gyár (factory)
- Gyöngyvirág (lily of the valley)
- Gyulafehérvár (former Hungarian city)
- Hargita (Székely-Hungarian mountains and county)
- Háromszék (Székely-Hungarian land)
- Hársfa (Tilia)
- Határ (city limit, city boundary, see: Határ út)
- Hold (moon)
- Honvéd (Honvéd is a soldier from the Hungarian National Army)
- Hősök (heroes', see: Hősök tere)
- Hungária (Latin name of Hungary)
- Ibolya (viola)
- Igló (former Hungarian city)
- Ipolyság (former Hungarian city)
- Iskola (school)
- Jegenye (black poplar)
- Kálvária (calvary)
- Kápolna (chapel)
- Kassai (former Hungarian city)
- Kereszt (Christian cross)
- Késmárki (former Hungarian city)
- Királyhágó (pass in Apuseni Mountains)
- Kolozsvári (former Hungarian city)
- Komáromi (Hungarian city)
- Kőrös (Hungarian river)
- Köztársaság (republic)
- Kuruc (Hungarian anti-Habsburg movement)
- Léva (former Hungarian city)
- Liget (grove)
- Liliom (Lilium)
- Losonc (former Hungarian city)
- Lőcse (former Hungarian city)
- Magyar (Hungarian)
- Május 1. (May Day)
- Máramarosi (former Hungarian land)
- Maros (Hungarian river)
- Mátra (Hungarian mountains)
- Meggyfa (sour cherry tree)
- Mexico (Latin-American country)
- Nádor (Hungarian dignitary)
- Nagybánya (former Hungarian city)
- Nagybecskerek (former Hungarian city)
- Nagyenyed (former Hungarian city)
- Nagykikinda (former Hungarian city)
- Nagyszalonta (former Hungarian city)
- Nagyszeben (former Hungarian city)
- Nagyszombat (former Hungarian city)
- Nagyszőlős (former Hungarian city)
- Nagyvárad (former Hungarian city, see: Nagyvárad tér)
- Nap (sun)
- Nefelejcs (forget me not)
- Nyár (summer)
- Nyitra (former Hungarian city)
- Nyúl (rabbit)
- Ógyalla (former Hungarian city)
- Pacsirta (skylark)
- Pálma (palm tree)
- Pannónia (Pannonia province)
- Pázsit (grass)
- Pillangó (butterfly), see: Pillangó utca
- Poprád (former Hungarian city)
- Pozsonyi (former Hungarian city)
- Rákos (Brook in Budapest)
- Rezeda (Reseda)
- Rigó (oriole)
- Rimaszombat (former Hungarian city)
- Római (Roman)
- Rózsa (rose)
- Rozsnyó (former Hungarian city)
- Sáfrány (saffron)
- Sajó (Hungarian river)
- Sas (eagle)
- Segesvár (former Hungarian city)
- Sólyom (falcon)
- Sport
- Stefánia (Stephanie, given name for girls)
- Szabadka (former Hungarian city)
- Szabadság (liberty)
- Szamos (Hungarian river)
- Szatmár (Hungarian land)
- Szegfű (clove pink)
- Szigetvári (Hungarian city)
- Szőlő (Vitis)
- Tátra (former Hungarian mountains)
- Tavasz (spring)
- Temesvári (former Hungarian city)
- Temető (graveyard)
- Templom (church)
- Tihany (Hungarian village)
- Tisza (Hungarian river)
- Tordai (former Hungarian city)
- Torockó (ethnic Hungarian village in Transylvania)
- Török (Turkish)
- Trencsén (former Hungarian city)
- Tulipán (tulip)
- Turul (mythological national bird of the Hungarians and Hungary)
- Tüzér (artilleryman)
- Udvarhely (former Hungarian county)
- Ugocsa (former Hungarian county)
- Újvidék (former Hungarian city)
- Ungvár (former Hungarian city)
- Uzsoki (former Hungarian mountains)
- Vág (former Hungarian river)
- Vágóhíd (slaughterhouse)
- Városház (city hall)
- Vasút (railway)
- Vereckei (pass in the Carpathians)
- Vezér (ruler)
- Viola (viol)
- Virág (flower)
- Zilah (former Hungarian city)
- Zombori (former Hungarian city)
- Zólyomi (former Hungarian city)
- This list is not complete, it consist only the most common public place names.
- In Budapest the name of former Hungarian cities (see: Treaty of Trianon) are very common for streets and squares. For example, there are 8 Kolozsvár streets and 9 Kassa streets.

== Most common public place names ==
- 17x : Lajos Kossuth, István Széchenyi
- 16x : Sándor Petőfi
- 14x : János Hunyadi, Mátyás király, Ferenc Rákóczi
- 13x : János Arany, József Bem, Mór Jókai, Szabadság, Szent István, Mihály Vörösmarty
- 12x : Árpád, Gábor Baross
- 11x : Endre Ady, Attila, Brassói, Ferenc Deák, József Eötvös, Erzsébet, Attila József
- 10x : Álmos, Lajos Batthyány, István Bocskai, Kassa, György Klapka, Nap, Pozsony etc.

== Former public place names ==
- Moszkva tér (Moscow Square), 1951–2011, now Széll Kálmán tér
- Lenin körút (Lenin Boulevard), 1970–1990, now Erzsébet and Teréz körút
- Sztálin út (Stalin Avenue), 1950–1956, now Andrássy Avenue
  - Népköztársaság útja (Avenue of the People's Republic), 1957–1990, now Andrássy Avenue
- Majakovszkij utca (Mayakovsky street), 1950–1990, now Király utca
- Tolbuhin körút (Tolbukhin Boulevard), 1945–1990, now Vámház körút
- Dimitrov tér (Dimitrov Square), 1949–1991, now Fővám tér
- Hitler tér (Hitler Square), 1938–1945, now Kodály körönd
- Roosevelt tér (Roosevelt Square), 1945–2011, now Széchenyi István tér
- Mussolini tér (Mussolini Square), 1936–1945, now Oktogon
  - November 7. tér (7 November Square), 1950–1990, now Oktogon
- Marx tér (Marx Square), 1950–1990, now Nyugati tér
- Felszabadulás tér ("Liberation" Square), 1953–1990, now Ferenciek tere
- Élmunkás tér (lit. "Top Worker" Square) until 1990, now Lehel tér

== See also ==
- Budapest
- Greater Budapest
- Budapest metropolitan area
- Demographics of Budapest
- History of Budapest

== Sources ==
- Budapest City Atlas, Szarvas-Dimap, Budapest, 2006, ISBN 963-9549-15-0-CM
- Budapest City Atlas, Szarvas-Dimap, Budapest, 2011, ISBN 978-963-03-9124-5
- Budapesti útmutató, street names, 1969
- Budapest City Atlas, 1974
