= Forgách utca metro station =

Budapest metro station

Forgách utca
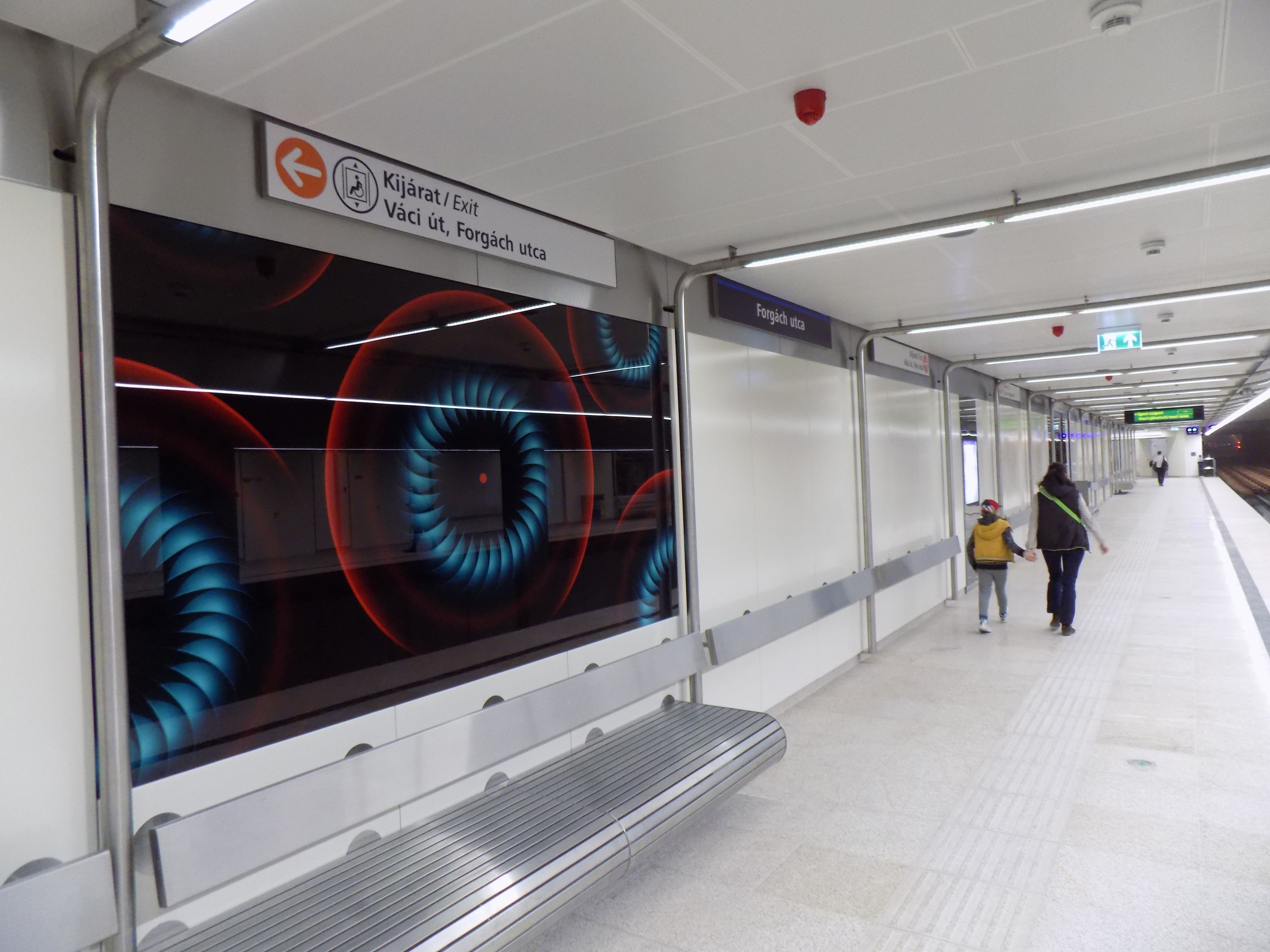

General information
- Location: Budapest, Hungary
- Coordinates: 47°32′21″N 19°04′11″E
- System: Budapest Metro station
- Platforms: 2 side platforms

Construction
- Structure type: Cut-and-cover underground
- Depth: 4.71 metres (15.5 ft)

History
- Opened: 14 December 1990
- Rebuilt: 30 March 2019

Services
Preceding station	Budapest Metro	Following station
Árpád híd towards Kőbánya-Kispest	Line 3	Gyöngyösi utca towards Újpest-központ
Location

Forgách utca (Forgách Street) is a station on the Budapest Metro Line 3 (North-South). It is located in Angyalföld district, beneath Váci út between its intersections with streets Fáy utca and Forgách utca. The station was opened on 14 December 1990 as part of the extension from Árpád híd.
