= Gyöngyösi utca metro station =

Budapest metro station

Gyöngyösi utca
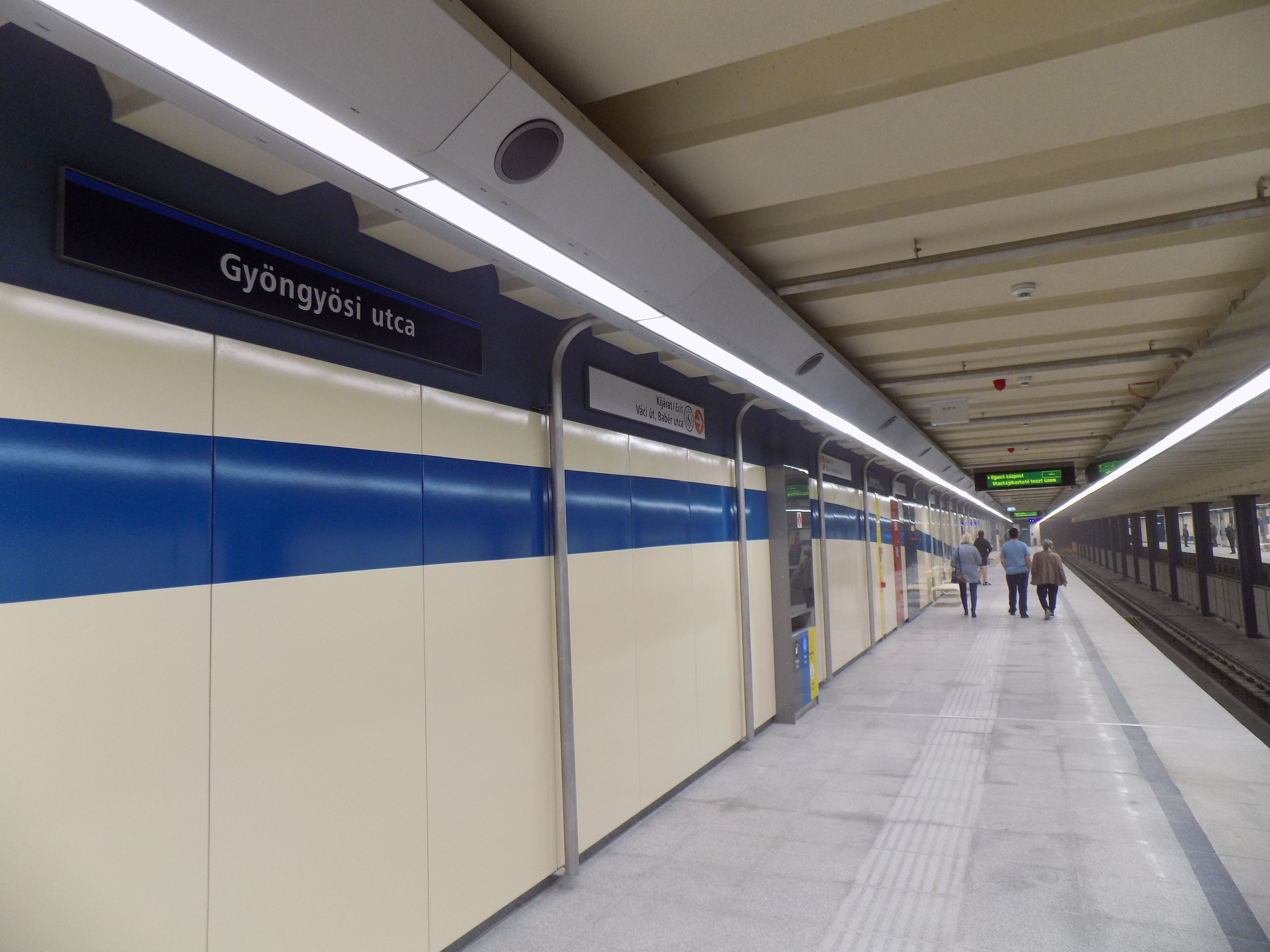

General information
- Location: Budapest, Hungary
- Coordinates: 47°32′55″N 19°04′22″E
- System: Budapest Metro station
- Platforms: 2 side platforms
- Connections: Bus: 15, 105

Construction
- Structure type: Cut-and-cover underground
- Depth: 4.51 m (14.8 ft)

History
- Opened: 14 December 1990
- Rebuilt: 30 March 2019

Services
Preceding station	Budapest Metro	Following station
Forgách utca towards Kőbánya-Kispest	Line 3	Újpest-városkapu towards Újpest-központ
Location

Gyöngyösi utca (Gyöngyösi Street) is a station on the Budapest Metro Line 3 (North-South). It is located under Váci út at its intersection with the streets Gyöngyösi utca and Meder utca. The station was opened on 14 December 1990 as part of the extension from Árpád híd.

It serves the residential and commercial parts of northwestern and northern Angyalföld, including the Duna Pláza shopping mall, which features an underground walkway to the station. Next to the station, there is a smaller microraion with prefabricated block of flats. It also serves the new upscale residential complex Marina part, located up on the Danube.

== Connections ==
- Bus: 15, 105, 210, 210B
