= Botond =

- Gender: Male
- Name day: 16 May

Origin
- Region of origin: Hungary

Botond is a Hungarian masculine given name and surname.

== People with the given name ==
- Botond (warrior), a 10th-century Hungarian folk hero
- Botond Antal (born 1991), Hungarian footballer
- Botond Balogh (born 2002), Hungarian footballer
- Botond Baráth (born 1992), Hungarian footballer
- Botond Birtalan (born 1989), Hungarian footballer
- Botond Bognar (born 1944), American architect
- Botond Csoma (born 1975), Romanian politician
- Botond Előd (born 1984), Hungarian actor
- Botond Kardos (born 1997), Hungarian gymnast
- Botond Király (born 1994), Hungarian footballer
- Botond Kőszegi (born 1973), Hungarian economist
- Botond Litkey (born 1967), Hungarian sailor
- Botond Molnár (born 2004), Hungarian gymnast
- Botond Roska (born 1969), Hungarian neuroscientist
- Botond Storcz (born 1975), Hungarian sprint canoeist
- Botond Vajda (born 2004), Hungarian footballer

== People with the surname ==
- Éva Botond (1921–1976), Hungarian figure skater
