= Újpest-városkapu metro station =

Budapest metro station

Újpest-városkapu
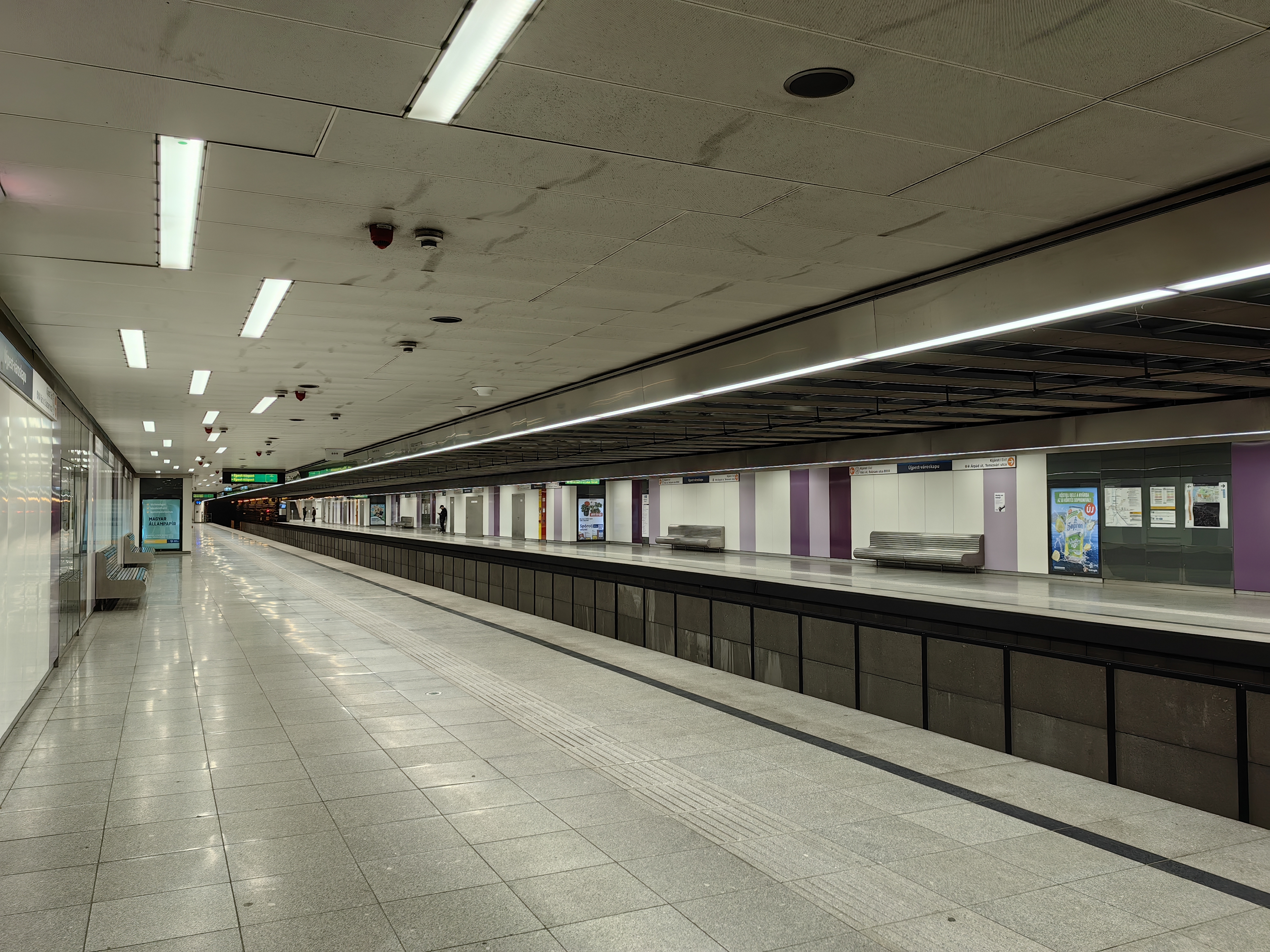

General information
- Location: Budapest, Hungary
- Coordinates: 47°33′34″N 19°04′51″E
- System: Budapest Metro station
- Platforms: 2 side platforms

Construction
- Structure type: Cut-and-cover underground
- Depth: 3.61 m (11.8 ft)

History
- Opened: 14 December 1990
- Rebuilt: 30 March 2019

Services
Preceding station	Budapest Metro	Following station
Gyöngyösi utca towards Kőbánya-Kispest	Line 3	Újpest-központ Terminus
Location

Újpest-városkapu (lit. Újpest-City Gate) is a station on the Budapest Metro Line 3 (North-South). The station was opened on 14 December 1990 as part of the extension from Árpád híd.

It primarily serves the extreme southwest corner of Újpest district, northwest Angyalföld and several northern suburbs through the bus terminal, railway station (commuter rail to Esztergom) and park and ride lot, located over the station.

== Connections ==
- Bus: 104, 104A, 121, 122E, 196, 196A, 204
- Regional buses: 300, 302, 303, 305, 308, 309, 310, 312, 313, 314, 315, 316, 318, 319, 320, 321, 872, 880, 882, 883, 884, 889, 890, 893
- Rail: Újpest stop on Budapest–Esztergom suburban line (S72, Z72 and S76 to Pilisvörösvár/Rákos lines)
