= Újpest (disambiguation) =

Újpest is a district of Budapest, Hungary.

Újpest may also refer to:

- Újpest FC, a football team based in Újpest
- Újpesti TE, a Hungarian sports society in Újpest

== See also ==
- Újpest–Központ (Budapest Metro)
