= Dózsa György út metro station =

Budapest metro station

Dózsa György út
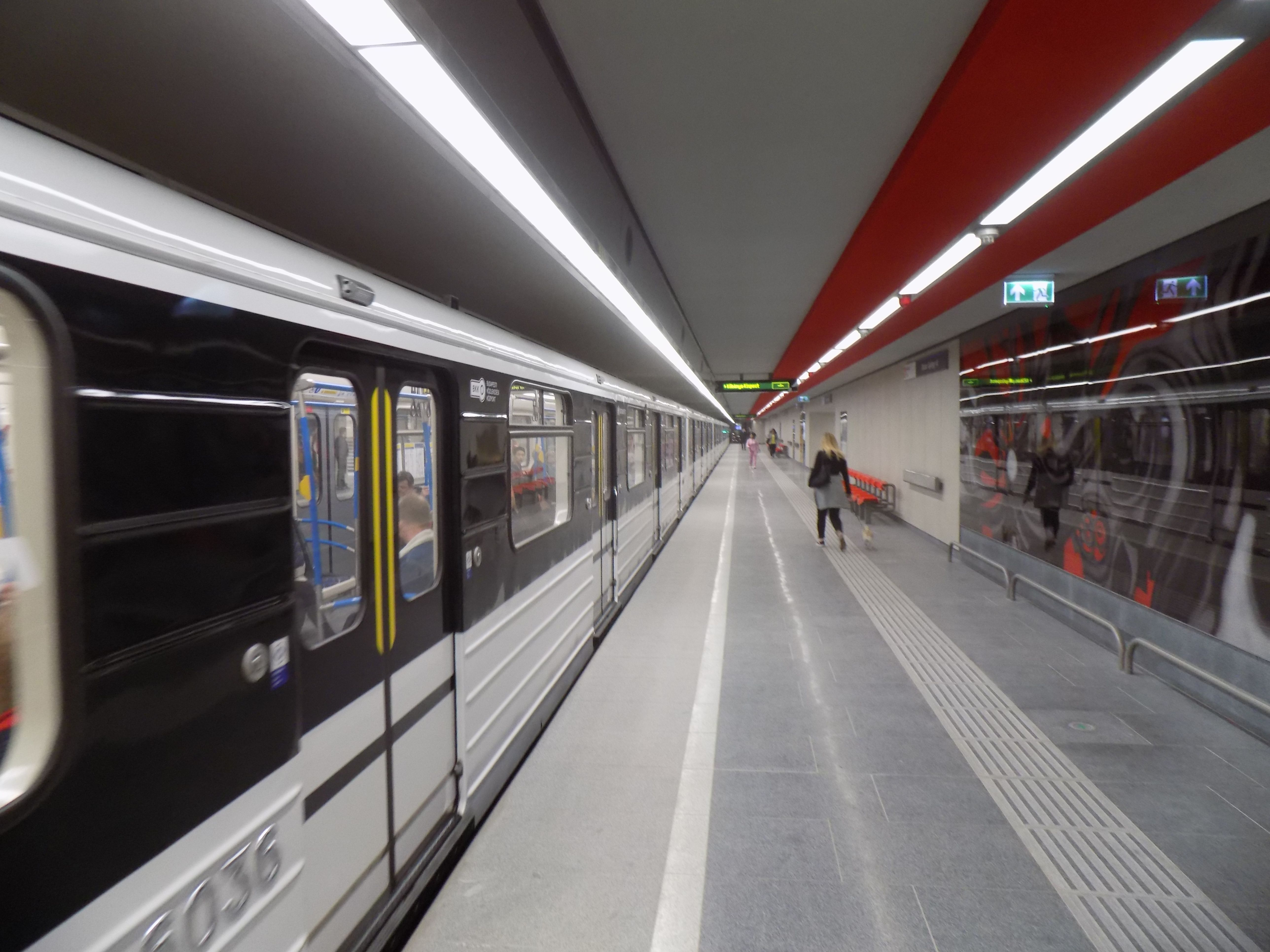

General information
- Location: Budapest, Hungary
- Coordinates: 47°31′27″N 19°03′48″E
- System: Budapest Metro station
- Platforms: 2 side platforms

Construction
- Structure type: Cut-and-cover underground
- Depth: 8.53 m (28.0 ft)

History
- Opened: 5 November 1984
- Rebuilt: 30 March 2019; 20 March 2023

Services
Preceding station	Budapest Metro	Following station
Lehel tér towards Kőbánya-Kispest	Line 3	Árpád híd towards Újpest-központ
Location

Dózsa György út (Hungarian pronunciation: [ˈdoːʒɒ ˈɟørɟ ˈuːt]) is a station on the Budapest Metro Line 3 (North-South). It is located beneath Váci Avenue at its intersection with the eponymous street Dózsa György út. The station was opened on 7 November 1984 as part of the extension from Lehel tér to Árpád híd.

== Connections ==
- Trolleybus: 75, 79
