= Arany János utca metro station =

Budapest metro station

Arany János utca
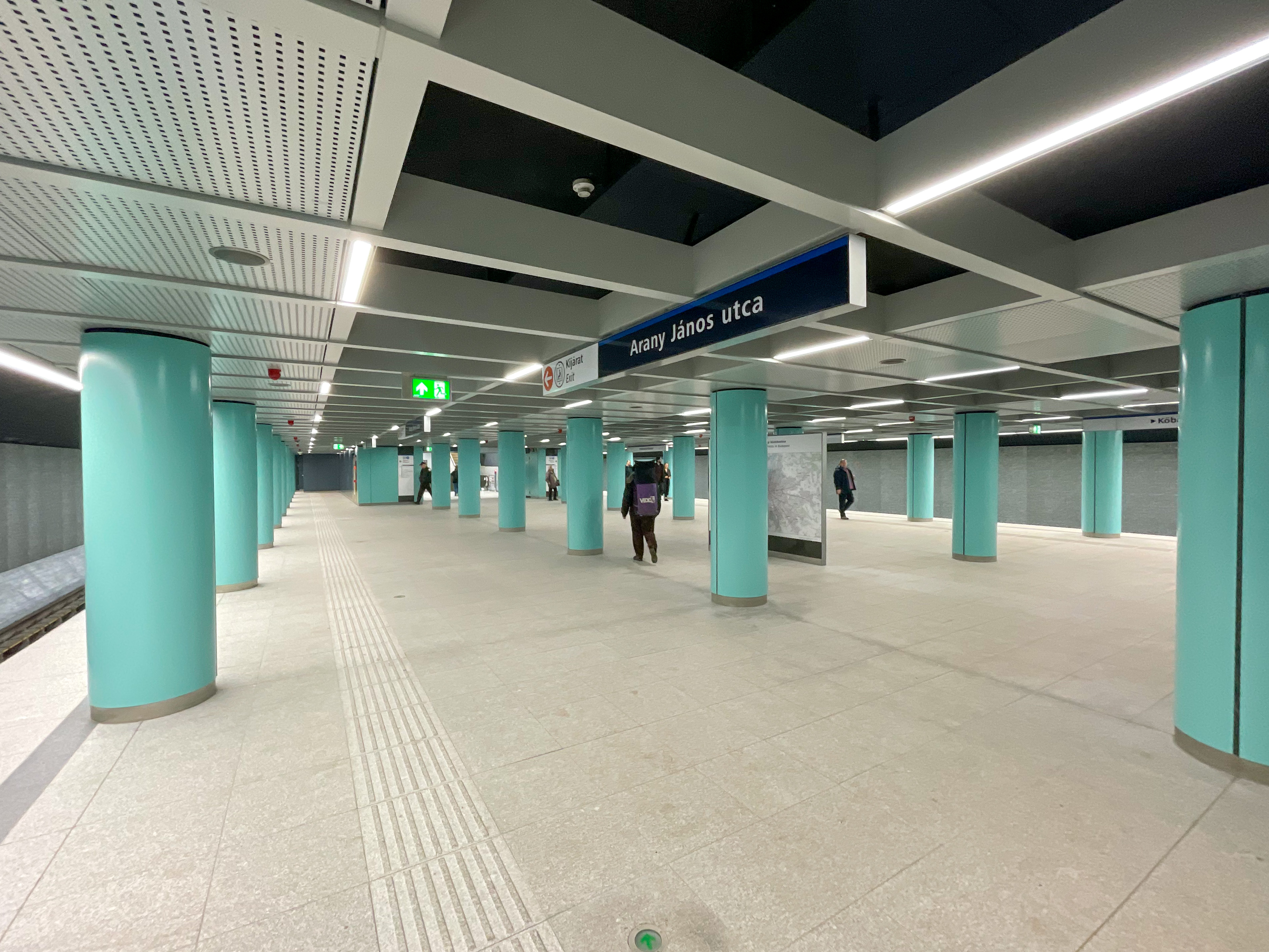

General information
- Location: Budapest; Hungary
- Coordinates: 47°30′11″N 19°03′16″E
- System: Budapest Metro station
- Platforms: 1 island platform

Construction
- Structure type: bored underground
- Depth: 24.02 m (78.8 ft)

History
- Opened: 30 December 1981
- Closed: 7 March 2020 temporarily
- Rebuilt: 20 March 2023

Services
Preceding station	Budapest Metro	Following station
Deák Ferenc tér towards Kőbánya-Kispest	Line 3	Nyugati pályaudvar towards Újpest-központ
Location

Arany János utca (János Arany Street) is a station on the M3 (North-South) line of the Budapest Metro. It is located in District V under Bajcsy-Zsilinszky Street. Its single entrance is on Podmaniczky Frigyes Square. The station was opened on 30 December 1981 as part of the extension of the line from Deák Ferenc tér to Lehel tér.

Saint Stephen's Basilica is a prominent landmark a block south of the station.

== Connections ==
- Trolleybus: 72
- Bus: 9, 15
