= List of Budapest Metro stations =

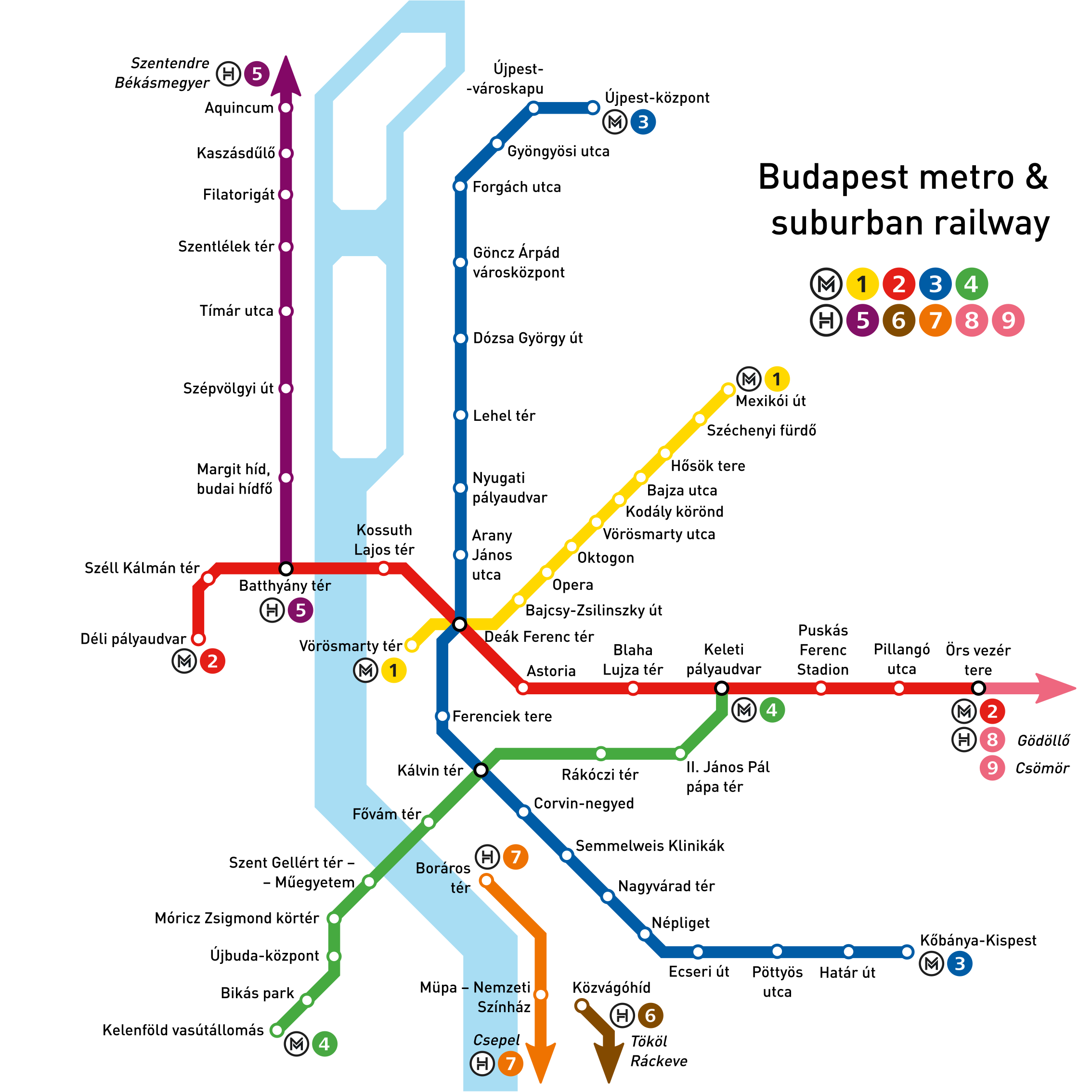

This is a list of the 52 stations of the Budapest Metro, which operates in Budapest, Hungary, including the dates of opening (and closure). Termini and interchange stations are in bold and bold italics, respectively. Stations with the access icon are barrier-free.

== Lines ==
Line	Color	Route	Length	Stations	Opened
	Yellow	Vörösmarty tér ↔ Mexikói út	4.4 km (3 mi)	11	1896
	Red	Déli pályaudvar ↔ Örs vezér tere	10.3 km (6 mi)	11	1970
	Blue	Újpest-központ ↔ Kőbánya-Kispest	16.5 km (10 mi)	20	1976
	Green	Kelenföld vasútállomás ↔ Keleti pályaudvar	7.4 km (5 mi)	10	2014
**Total**			**38.6 km (24 mi)**	**52**

== Stations ==
=== M1 Line (Millennium Underground) ===
**(Vörösmarty tér – Mexikói út)**
Travel time minutes	Station	Travel time minutes	Photograph	Opened/closed	Type	Connection	Buildings / monuments
0	**Vörösmarty tér** (formerly: Gizella tér)	11		3 May 1896; 30 Dec 1973 (renovation); Nov 1995 (renovation)	cut-and-cover underground station 2 side platforms	2; 15, 115; City	Vigadó, Café Gerbeaud, Ministry of Finance, Pest Theatre, Váci street
1	Deák Ferenc tér	10		3 May 1896; 1955 (relocation); 30 Dec 1973 (renovation); Nov 1995 (renovation)	cut-and-cover underground station 2 side platforms	47, 48, 49; 9, 16, 100E, 105, 210, 210B	Town Hall, County Hall, Metro Museum (Földalatti Vasúti Múzeum), Anker Palace, Theaters (Stephen Örkény (István Örkény), Merlin), Hotels (Kempinski, Meridien), Imre Madách square, Elisabeth square Cultural Centre and Park (Gödör (Pit)), Evangelic Church
2	Bajcsy-Zsilinszky út (formerly: Váczi körút)	9		3 May 1896; 30 Dec 1973 (renovation); Nov 1995 (renovation)	cut-and-cover underground station 2 side platforms	9, 105, 210, 210B	St. Stephen's Basilica, Postmuseum
3	Opera	8		3 May 1896; 30 Dec 1973 (renovation); Nov 1995 (renovation)	cut-and-cover underground station 2 side platforms	70, 78; 105, 210, 210B	Hungarian State Opera House, Dreschler Palace, Divatcsarnok (Hall of Fashion), Theaters (Central, Új (New))
4	Oktogon (formerly: November Hetedike tér)	7		3 May 1896; 30 Dec 1973 (renovation); Nov 1995 (renovation)	cut-and-cover underground station 2 side platforms	4, 6; 105, 210, 210B	Theaters (Operette, Mikroszkóp, Miklós Radnóti, Thália, Kolibri, Tivoli), Művész mozi (Artist Cinema), Franz Liszt Academy of Music, Ernst Museum, Royal Hotel
5	Vörösmarty utca	6		3 May 1896; 30 Dec 1973 (renovation); Nov 1995 (renovation)	cut-and-cover underground station 2 side platforms	73, 76; 105, 210, 210B	Budapest Puppet Theatre, House of Terror, Hungarian University of Fine Arts, Ferenc Liszt (Franz Liszt) Memorialhouse, Old Zeneakadémia (Academy of Music), Hungarian Journalists National Federation (MÚOSZ) headquarters
6	Kodály körönd (formerly: Körönd)	5		3 May 1896; 30 Dec 1973 (renovation); Nov 1995 (renovation)	cut-and-cover underground station 2 side platforms	105, 210, 210B	Zoltán Kodály Memorial and Archive
7	Bajza utca	4		3 May 1896; 30 Dec 1973 (renovation); Nov 1995 (renovation)	cut-and-cover underground station 2 side platforms	105, 210, 210B	Ferenc Hopp Museum of Asiatic Arts
8	Hősök tere (formerly: Aréna út)	3		3 May 1896; 30 Dec 1973 (renovation); Nov 1995 (renovation)	cut-and-cover underground station 2 side platforms	72, 75, 79; 20E, 30, 30A, 105, 210, 210B, 230	Museum of Fine Arts, Műcsarnok (Hall of Exhibitions), Városliget (City Park), Hősök tere (Heroes square), Városligeti Műjégpálya (City Park Ice Rink)
-	Állatkert	-		3 May 1896; 1973 (closure)	formerly overground station 2 side platforms	72	Zoo and Botanical Garden, Fővárosi Nagycirkusz (Capital Circus), Városliget (City Park)
9	Széchenyi fürdő (formerly: Artézi fürdő)	2		3 May 1896; 30 Dec 1973 (renovation/relocation); Nov 1995 (renovation)	formerly overground station cut-and-cover underground station 2 side platforms	72	Széchenyi thermal bath, Zoo and Botanical Garden, Fővárosi Nagycirkusz (Capital Circus), Városliget (City Park)
11	**Mexikói út**	0		30 Dec 1973; Nov 1995 (renovation)	cut-and-cover underground station 2 side platforms	1, 3, 69; 74, 74A; 25, 32, 225	BVSC stadium and swimming pool

=== M2 Line (East-West line) ===
**Déli pályaudvar – Örs vezér tere**
Travel time minutes	Station	Travel time minutes	Photograph	Opened	Type	Connection	Buildings / monuments
00:00	**Örs vezér tere** (formerly: Fehér út) ♿	19:25		2 April 1970; 2007 (renovation)	overground station 1 island platform and 1 side platform	3, 62, 62A; 80, 81, 82; 10, 31, 32, 44, 45, 67, 85, 85E, 97E, 131, 144, 161, 161A, 168E, 169E, 174, 176E, 231, 244, 261E, 276E, 277; 907, 908, 931, 956, 990; 1002; 410, 419, 430, 440, 441, 484, 485, 486, 505, 510; 1040, 1049, 1070, 1075, 1077, 1078	**Örs vezér tere** HÉV station and bus station Árkád and Sugár shopping centre, IKEA furniture store
02:10	Pillangó utca ♿	16:25		2 April 1970; 2007 (renovation)	overground station 2 side platforms	10	Kincsem Park (Horse race track)
04:07	Puskás Ferenc Stadion (formerly: Népstadion & Stadionok) ♿	14:35		2 April 1970; 2007 (renovation)	cut-and-cover underground station 2 island platforms	1, 1A; 75, 77, 80, 80A; 95, 130, 195; 901, 908, 918, 931, 937, 956, 990; 396, 397, 398, 399, 400, 402, 403, 410, 412, 414, 422, 424, 430, 432, 434, 435, 436, 437, 438, 439, 440, 441, 442, 485, 486; 1020, 1021, 1024, 1031, 1032, 1034, 1035, 1037, 1039, 1040, 1045, 1046, 1049, 1050, 1052, 1054, 1057, 1059, 1060, 1061, 1063, 1067, 1068, 1069, 1070, 1071, 1075, 1076, 1077, 1078	**Stadion** bus station Puskás Aréna, Ferenc Puskás Stadium, László Papp Budapest Sports Arena, Kisstadion, Körcsarnok, SYMA Hall, Stand-by police
06:50	Keleti pályaudvar	11:50		2 April 1970; 2005 (renovation)	bored underground station 1 island platform	23, 24; 73, 76, 78, 79, 80, 80A; 5, 7, 7E, 8E, 20E, 30, 30A, 108E, 110, 112, 133E, 178, 230; 907, 908, 931, 956, 973, 990; Hungarian State Railways (MÁV)	**Keleti pályaudvar** railway station Arena Plaza, Sándor Péterfy Street Hospital, Pension Payment Directorate, Police Museum, District VII. Town Hall, MÁV Railway Directorate, National Riding Hall, Hungária Hotel, Park Hotel, Intercity Hotel Budapest, Jenő Manninger Accident and Emergency Center, Department of Traumatology (Semmelweis University)
08:40	Blaha Lujza tér	10:02		2 April 1970; 2004 (renovation)	bored underground station 1 island platform	4, 6, 28, 28A, 37, 37A, 62; 74; 5, 7, 7E, 8E, 99, 108E, 110, 112, 133E, 178, 217E; 907, 908, 923, 931, 956, 973, 990	New York Palace Budapest, Corvin department store, Uránia National Picture Theater, Saint Rókus Hospital, Óbuda University (BGK), Hotels (EMKE, Nemzeti (National))
10:07	Astoria	08:35		2 April 1970; 2005 (renovation)	bored underground station 1 island platform	47, 48, 49; 74; 5, 7, 8E, 9, 108E, 110, 112, 133E, 178; 907, 908, 909, 914, 914A, 916, 931, 950, 950A, 956, 973, 979, 979A, 990	ELTE - Faculty of Humanities (BTK), Hotel Astoria, Dohány Street Synagogue, Downtown Theatre, Puskin cinema
11:50	Deák Ferenc tér	06:55		2 April 1970; 2006 (renovation)	bored underground station 1 island platform	47, 48, 49, 49; 9, 16, 100E, 105, 210, 210B; 909, 914, 914A, 916, 931, 950, 950A, 979, 979A, 990	Budapest City Hall, County Hall, Metro Museum (Földalatti Vasúti Múzeum), Anker Palace, Theaters (Stephen Örkény (István Örkény), Merlin), Hotels (Kempinski, Meridien), Imre Madách square, Elisabeth square Cultural Centre and Park (Gödör (Pit)), Evangelic Church
13:45	Kossuth Lajos tér (formerly: Kossuth tér)	04:55		12 Dec 1972; 2004 (renovation)	bored underground station 1 island platform	2, 23; 70, 78, City; 15, 115	**Kossuth Lajos tér** boat station Parliament, Ethnographic Museum, Ministry of Agriculture and Rural Development, Office/Administrative District
15:12	Batthyány tér	03:27		12 Dec 1972; 2005 (renovation)	bored underground station 1 island platform	19, 41; 11, 39, 109, 111; 990	**Batthyány tér** HÉV and boat station Batthyány tér Market Hall, St. Anne church, Church and Monastery of Elizabeth-nuns, Foundry Museum, Ministry of Development
17:00	Széll Kálmán tér (formerly: Moszkva tér)	01:40		12 Dec 1972; 2006 (renovation)	bored underground station 1 island platform	4, 6, 17, 56, 56A, 59, 59A, 59B, 61; 5, 16, 16A, 21, 21A, 22, 22A, 39, 91, 102, 116, 128, 129, 139, 140, 140A, 149, 155, 156, 222; 916, 922, 956, 960, 990; 781, 782, 783, 784, 785, 786, 787, 789, 791, 793, 794, 795	**Széna-tér** bus station Buda Castle District, Városmajor (park), Millenáris Park, Post Palace Budapest, Mammut shopping centre, National Media and Communications Authorities, Ministry of Economy
18:25	**Déli pályaudvar**	00:00		12 Dec 1972; 2006 (renovation)	bored underground station 1 island platform	17, 56, 56A, 59, 59A, 59B, 61; 21, 21A, 39, 102, 139, 140, 140A; 960, 990; 1256; Hungarian State Railways (MÁV)	**Déli pályaudvar** railway station Vérmező (park), National Oncological Institute, Financial Organizations National Supervision

=== M3 Line (North-South line) ===
First section in 1976, then expansions in 1980, 1981, 1984 and 1990. It is usually marked blue. According to schedule, it runs along in 31 minutes.

**Kőbánya-Kispest – Újpest-központ**
Travel time minutes	Station	Travel time minutes	Photograph	Opened	Type	Connection	Buildings / monuments
0	**Kőbánya-Kispest** ♿	32		29 March 1980 3 September 2011 22 October 2020 (renovation)	overground station 2 side platforms	68, 85, 85E, 93, 93A, 98, 98E, 132E, 136, 148, 151, 182, 182A, 184, 193E, 200E, 202E, 268, 282E, 284E Regional buses Hungarian State Railways (MÁV)	Kőbánya-Kispest railway station, KÖKI Shopping Mall, Bosch Budapest Innovation Campus, Újpest Swimming Pool
2	Határ út ♿	30		29 March 1980 22 October 2020 (renovation)	1 island platform and 1 side platform	42, 50, 52 66, 66B, 66E, 84E, 89E, 94E, 99, 123, 123A, 142E, 194, 194B, 294E Regional buses	Shopmark Shopping Mall, Száva tram depot, Ibis Budapest Aero Hotel, Száva street transmission tower, Kőér street swimming pool
4	Pöttyös utca ♿	28		29 March 1980 22 October 2020 (renovation)	cut-and-cover underground station 2 side platforms		
5	Ecseri út ♿	27		29 March 1980 22 October 2020 (renovation)	cut-and-cover underground station 2 side platforms	3 181, 254E, 281	Church of the Holy Cross, BIF Tower, ELTE Gusztáv Bárczi Faculty of Special Education
7	Népliget ♿	25		29 March 1980 22 October 2020 (renovation)	cut-and-cover underground station 2 side platforms	1, 1M 83 254E Regional buses Long-distance buses	Népliget, Groupama Arena, Planetarium, MVM Dome, Magyar Telekom headquarters, National Museum and Library of Pedagogy, Népliget Bus Station, St. Stephen and St. Ladislaus Hospitals
9	Nagyvárad tér ♿	23		31 December 1976 22 May 2023 (renovation)	cut-and-cover underground station 1 island platform	23, 24 281	Semmelweis University Nagyvárad Téri Elméleti Tömb (NET), Hungarian Natural History Museum, Ludovika Military Academy, Orczy Park, National University of Public Service, Pál Heim Children's Hospital, St. Stephen and St. Ladislaus Hospitals
11	Semmelweis Klinikák (formerly: Klinikák) ♿	21		31 December 1976 14 May 2022 (renovation)	bored underground station 1 island platform		Semmelweis University Clinic, Sándor Wekerle Business College, Klára Leövey High School
12	Corvin-negyed (formerly: Ferenc körút) ♿	20		31 December 1976 14 May 2022 (renovation)	bored underground station 1 island platform	4, 6 223E 83 (Üllői út)	Museum of Applied Arts, Corvin Cinema, Corvin Plaza, former Kilián Barracks, Flag Museum, Trafó – House of Contemporary Arts, Holocaust Memorial Center
14	Kálvin tér ♿	18		31 December 1976 14 May 2022 (renovation)	bored underground station 1 island platform	47, 48, 49 72, 83 9, 15, 100E, 223E	Fővárosi Szabó Ervin Könyvtár, Hungarian National Museum, Kálvin tér Reformed Church, Vörösmarty Cinema, Mercure Budapest Korona Hotel
15	Ferenciek tere (formerly: Felszabadulás tér)♿	17		31 December 1976 20 March 2023 (renovation)	bored underground station 1 island platform	5, 7, 8E, 15, 107, 108E, 110, 112, 133E	Church of Saint Peter of Alcantara, Klotild Palaces, Budapest City Hall, Petőfi Literary Museum, József Katona Theater, ELTE University Library, Paris Court (Brudern House), István Csók Gallery
16	Deák Ferenc tér ♿	15		31 December 1976 20 March 2023 (renovation)	bored underground station 1 island platform	47, 48, 49 9, 16, 100E, 105, 178, 210, 210B, 216	Budapest City Hall, County Hall, Metro Museum (Földalatti Vasúti Múzeum), Anker Palace, Theaters (Stephen Örkény (István Örkény), Merlin), Hotels (Kempinski, Meridien), Imre Madách square, Elisabeth square Cultural Centre and Park (Gödör (Pit)), Evangelic Church
17	Arany János utca ♿	14		30 December 1981 20 March 2023 (renovation)	bored underground station 1 island platform	72 9	St. Stephen's Basilica, Hungarian National Bank, Toldi Cinema, Centrál Theater,
18	Nyugati pályaudvar (formerly: Marx tér) ♿	12		30 December 1981 20 March 2023 (renovation)	bored underground station 1 island platform	4, 6 72, 73 9, 26, 91, 191, 226, 291 Hungarian State Railways (MÁV)	Nyugati pályaudvar, WestEnd City Center, Comedy Theatre of Budapest, Skála Metró, Játékszín Theater
22	Lehel tér (formerly: Élmunkás tér)♿	10		30 December 1981 20 March 2023 (renovation)	cut-and-cover underground station 1 island platform	14 76 15	Lehel csarnok, WestEnd City Center, Church of St. Margaret
23	Dózsa György út ♿	9		5 November 1984 30 March 2019 20 March 2023 (renovation)	cut-and-cover underground station 2 side platforms	75, 79	Budapest Electric Works headquarters, Berzsenyi Dániel Gimnázium,H2Offices, Vision Towers, Capital Square
25	Göncz Árpád városközpont (formerly: Árpád híd) ♿	7		5 November 1984 30 March 2019 (renovation)	cut-and-cover underground station 2 side platforms	1, 1M 26, 32, 34, 106, 120 Regional buses	Árpád Bridge Bus Station, Central Pension Office building, Agora Budapest, National Health Insurance Fund, Budapest Police headquarters, Attila József theater
27	Forgách utca ♿	5		14 December 1990 30 March 2019 (renovation)	cut-and-cover underground station 2 side platforms	32	Church of Saint Martin of Tours, Láng Cultural Center, Angyalföld Sport Center, Váci Corner
29	Gyöngyösi utca ♿	3		14 December 1990 30 March 2019 (renovation)	cut-and-cover underground station 2 side platforms	15, 105, 210, 210B	Duna Plaza, Madarász Street Children's Hospital, Marina Part, M12 OTP building, Budapest Waterworks
31	Újpest-városkapu ♿	1		14 December 1990 30 March 2019 (renovation)	cut-and-cover underground station 2 side platforms	104, 104A, 121, 122E, 196, 196A, 204 Regional buses Long-distance buses Hungarian State Railways (MÁV)	Újpest Railway Station, Újpest-Városkapu Bus Station, Újpest Railway Bridge, Borsodi Brewery building, Tesco
32	**Újpest-központ** ♿	0		14 December 1990 30 March 2019 (renovation)	cut-and-cover underground station 2 side platforms	12, 14 25, 30, 30A, 104, 104A, 120, 147, 170, 196, 196A, 204, 220, 230, 270 Regional buses	Újpest Town Hall, Újpest Police Station, Újpest Market, Újpest Department Store

=== M4 Line (Northeast-Southwest) ===
Line M4 was originally scheduled to be complete around 2005, but, as there were numerous political debates over it, not to mention a number of civilian protests against tunnelling at certain parts of the city, building only started in 2005 and the completion date was rescheduled to 2012 or 2013. The line opened to the public at noon on 28 March 2014.

**Kelenföld vasútállomás – Keleti pályaudvar**
Travel time minutes	Station	Travel time minutes	Photograph	Opened	Type	Connection	Buildings / monuments
0:00	**Kelenföld vasútállomás** ♿	13:45		28 March 2014	mixed underground station 1 island platform	1, 19, 49 8E, 40, 40B, 40E, 53, 58, 87, 87A, 88, 88A, 101B, 101E, 108E, 141, 150, 150B, 153, 154, 172, 173, 187, 188, 188E, 250, 250B, 251, 251A, 251E, 272 Regional buses Hungarian State Railways (MÁV)	Budapest-Kelenföld railway station, Kelenföld Bus Station, Etele Plaza, Budapest ONE, Intermodal junction
1:42	Bikás park ♿	12:15		28 March 2014	cut-and-cover underground station 1 island platform	1 7, 58, 114, 153, 213, 214 Regional buses	Bikás Park, Tétényi út Market, Kelenföld Library (FSZEK), Szent Imre Hospital
3:52	Újbuda-központ ♿	10:07		28 March 2014	cut-and-cover underground station 1 island platform	4, 17, 41, 47, 48, 56 33, 53, 58, 150, 150B, 153, 154, 212, 212A, 212B Long-distance buses	Allee Shopping Mall, Fehérvári út Market Hall, Szent Kristóf Clinic
5:10	Móricz Zsigmond körtér ♿	8:45		28 March 2014	mixed underground station 1 island platform	6, 17, 19, 41, 47, 48, 49, 56, 56A, 61 7, 27, 33, 33A, 58, 114, 213, 214, 240	St. Margaret Roman Catholic Religious Grammar School, Lake Feneketlen, Attila József High School, Buda Cistercian Saint Imre High School, Church of Saint Emeric
6:52	Szent Gellért tér – Műegyetem ♿	7:05		28 March 2014	mixed underground station 1 island platform	19, 41, 47, 48, 49, 56, 56A 7, 107, 133E	Budapest University of Technology and Economics, Gellért Thermal Baths and Swimming Pool, Gellért Hill Cave,
8:07	Fővám tér ♿	5:55		28 March 2014	mixed underground station 1 island platform	2, 2B, 23, 47, 48, 49 83 15, 223E	Corvinus University of Budapest, Great Market Hall, Bálna
9:30	Kálvin tér ♿	4:35		28 March 2014	mixed underground station 1 island platform	47, 48, 49 72, 83 9, 15, 100E, 223E	Fővárosi Szabó Ervin Könyvtár, Hungarian National Museum, Kálvin tér Reformed Church, Vörösmarty Cinema, Mercure Budapest Korona Hotel
11:12	Rákóczi tér ♿	2:47		28 March 2014	mixed underground station 1 island platform	4, 6	Rákóczi tér Market Hall
12:35	II. János Pál pápa tér ♿	1:22		28 March 2014	mixed underground station 1 island platform	28, 28A, 37, 37A, 62 99, 217E	Erkel Theatre, Jenő Manninger Accident and Emergency Center, Department of Traumatology (Semmelweis University)
13:45	**Keleti pályaudvar** ♿	0:00		28 March 2014	mixed underground station 1 island platform	23, 24 73, 76, 78, 79, 80 5, 7, 7E, 8E, 20E, 30, 30A, 107, 108E, 110, 112, 133E, 230 Hungarian State Railways (MÁV)	**Keleti pályaudvar** railway station Arena Plaza, Sándor Péterfy Street Hospital, Pension Payment Directorate, Police Museum, District VII. Town Hall, MÁV Railway Directorate, National Riding Hall, Hungária Hotel, Park Hotel, Intercity Hotel Budapest, Jenő Manninger Accident and Emergency Center, Department of Traumatology (Semmelweis University)

== Planned future stations ==
=== M1 Line ===
- Vigadó tér
- Hungária Körút
- Kassai tér
- Balázs Park
- Rákosszeg Park
- Csáktornya Park
- Marcheggi-híd
- or Rákosrendező railway station

=== M2 Line ===
==== Integration with H8 ====
- Törökőr
- Egyenes utcai Lakótelep / Körvasút
- Sashalom, Thököly út
- Mátyásföld, Jókai Mór utca
- Mátyásföld, Erzsébetliget

==== Rákosmente branch ====
- (Rákos)
- Akadémiaújtelep
- Kis utca
- Rákoskeresztúr Városközpont

=== M3 Line ===
==== To the north ====
- Rózsa utca
- Rákospalota - Újpest Railway Station
- further to Káposztásmegyer

=== M4 Line ===
==== To the west ====
- Gazdagrét ? (planned)
- Madárhegy ? (planned)
- further to Budaörs

==== To the northeast ====
- Reiner Frigyes park ? (planned)
- Zugló Vasútállomás ? (planned)
- Tisza István tér ? (planned)
- Bosnyák tér ? (planned)
- further to Újpalota

=== M5 Line (North-South) ===
Metro line 5, Észak-déli Regionális Gyorsvasút (North-South Regional Rapid Railway; provisional name), is planned to be a suburban railways' connector line, meant to replace and connect the lines of the existing suburban railways between Szentendre (currently served by HÉV Line 5), Ráckeve (currently served by HÉV Line 6) and Csepel (currently served by HÉV Line 7). It will cross Budapest downtown, and provide connection for the railway stations in the city. It will probably have the following stations (except for the termini, only those within Budapest are included):

- **Szentendre**
- ...
- Békásmegyer
- Petőfi tér
- Csillaghegy
- Rómaifürdő
- Aquincum
- Záhony u.
- Kaszásdűlő
- Bogdáni út
- Flórián tér
- Amfiteátrum
- Szépvölgyi út
- (Margitsziget)
- Szent István park
- **Nyugati Pályaudvar** (or Lehel tér)
- **Oktogon**
- (Klauzál tér)
- **Astoria**
- **Kálvin tér**
- Boráros tér
- (Haller utca)
- Közvágóhíd
- Beöthy u.
- Kén u.
- Timót u.
- Határ út
- Pesterzsébet – városközpont
- Nagysándor József u.
- Klapka Gy. u.
- Wesselényi u. (or Akácfa u. instead of the latter two)
- Vörösmarty tér
- Könyves u.
- Tárcsás u.
- Soroksári vasútállomás
- BILK (logisztikai központ)
- ...
- **Csepel**, **Ráckeve**

Branching at Könyves u.:

- Soroksár felső
- Soroksár – Hősök tere
- Szent István u.
- Millennium-telep
- ...

See the map.

== See also ==
- Trams in Budapest
- List of Budapest HÉV stations
- List of metro systems
