= Kossuth Lajos tér metro station =

Budapest metro station

Kossuth Lajos tér
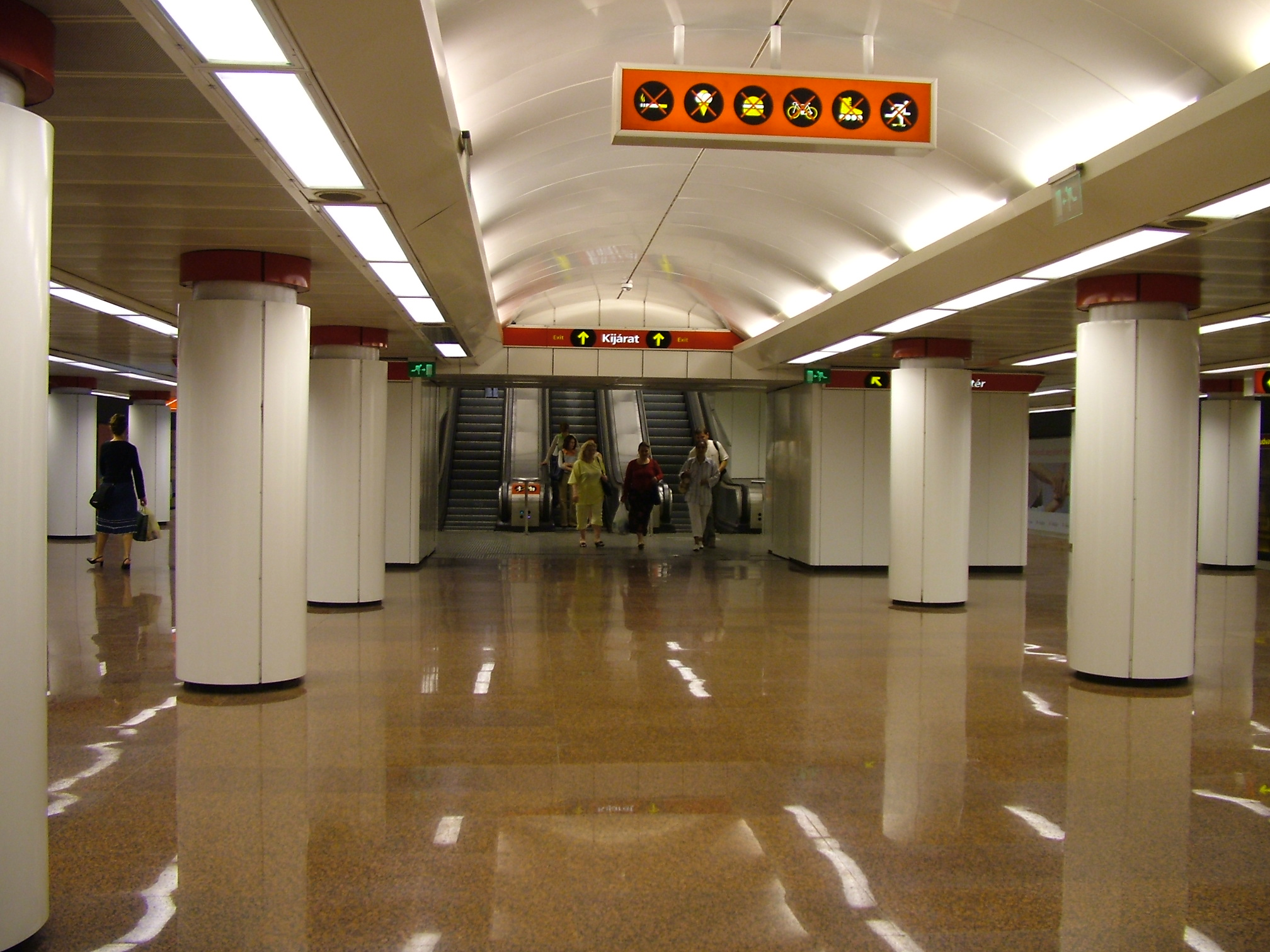

General information
- Coordinates: 47°30′20″N 19°02′47″E
- System: Budapest Metro station
- Platforms: 1 island platform

Construction
- Structure type: bored underground
- Depth: 34.53 metres (113.3 ft)

History
- Opened: 22 December 1972
- Rebuilt: 2004

Services
Preceding station	Budapest Metro	Following station
Batthyány tér towards Déli pályaudvar	Line 2	Deák Ferenc tér towards Örs vezér tere
Location

Kossuth Lajos tér (Lajos Kossuth Square) is a station on the M2 (East-West) line of the Budapest Metro. It is located south of Lajos Kossuth Square in Pest, immediately on the left bank of the Danube river. The station was opened on 22 December 1972 as part of the extension of the line from Deák Ferenc tér to Déli pályaudvar.

== Connections ==
- Tram
  - 2 Jászai Mari tér – Közvágóhíd
  - 2B Jászai Mari tér – Pesterzsébet, Pacsirtatelep
  - 23 Jászai Mari tér – Keleti pályaudvar
- Trolleybus
  - 70 Erzsébet királyné útja, aluljáró – Kossuth Lajos tér
  - 78 Keleti pályaudvar (Garay utca) – Kossuth Lajos tér
- Bus: 15

== Gallery ==
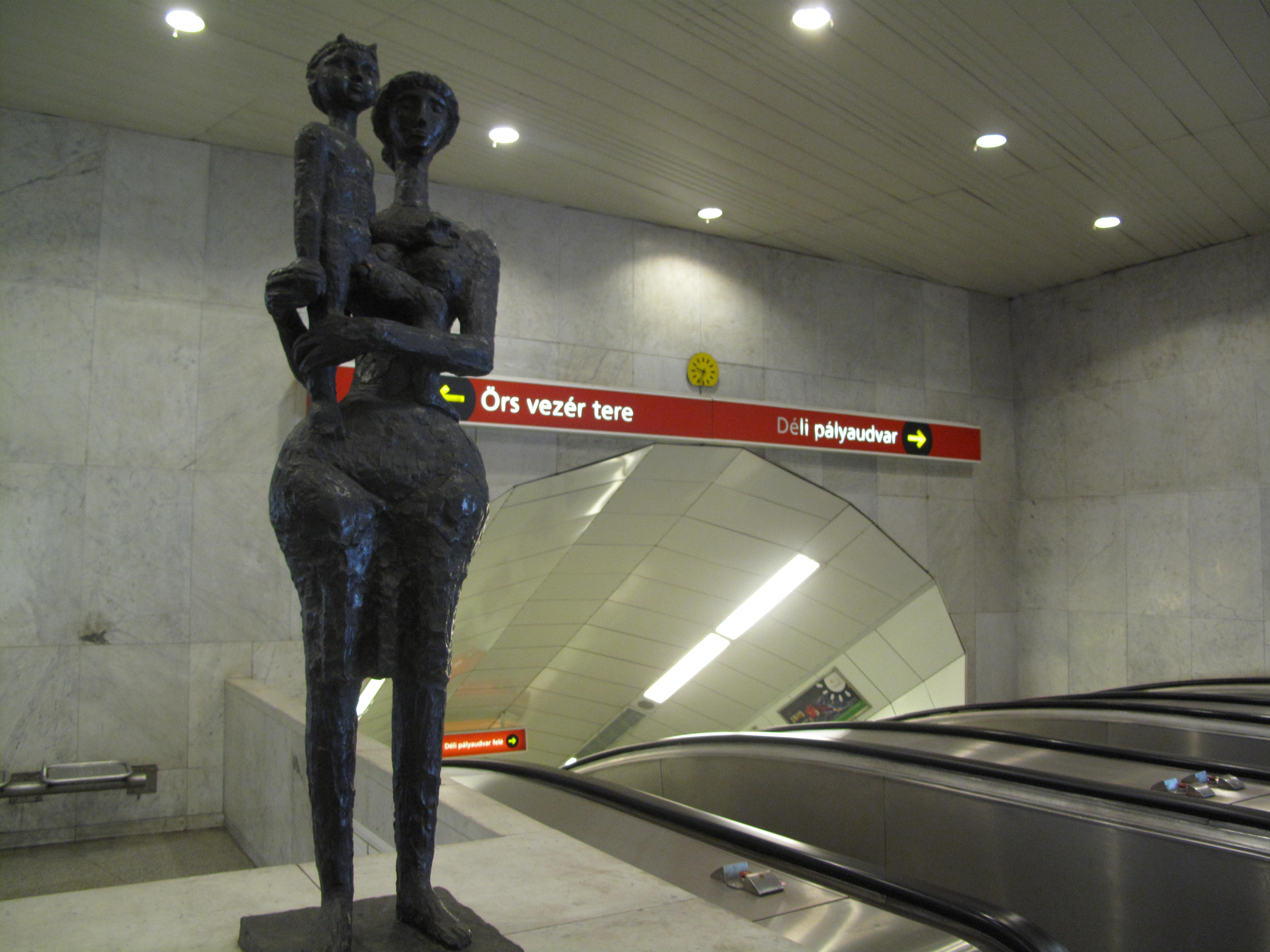

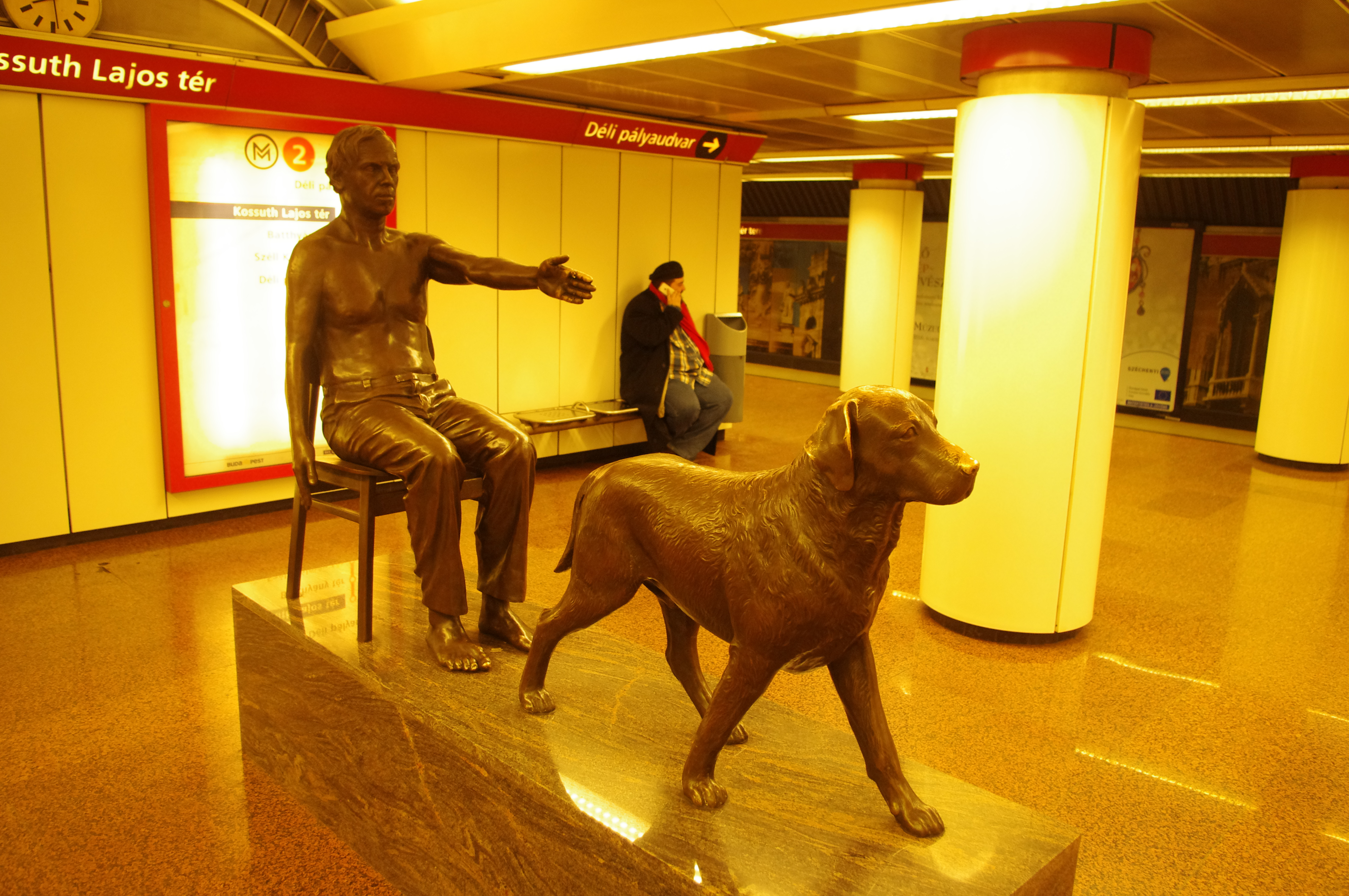

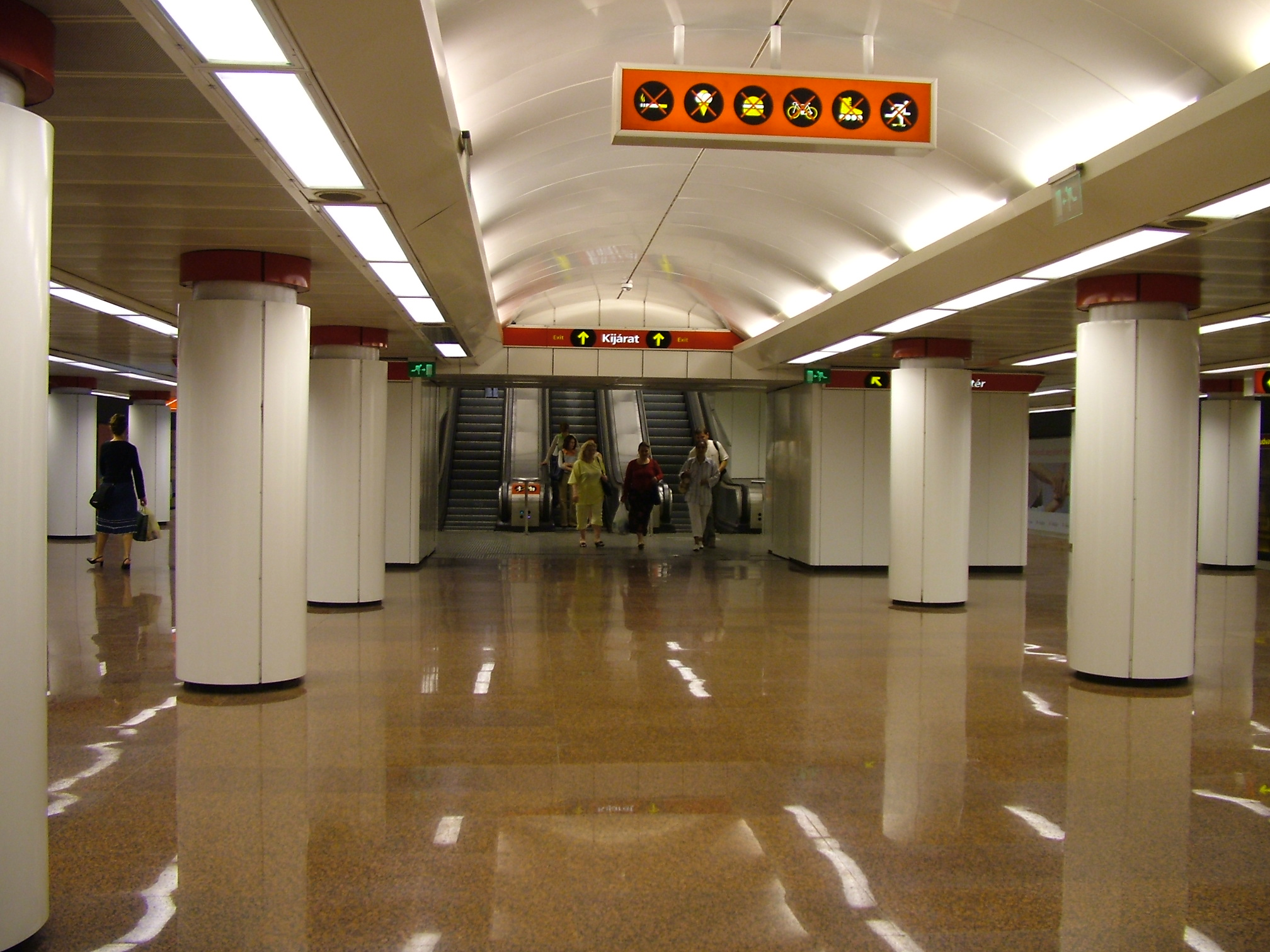
