= Váci út =

Street in Budapest, Hungary

Coordinates: 47.5598°N 19.0772°E

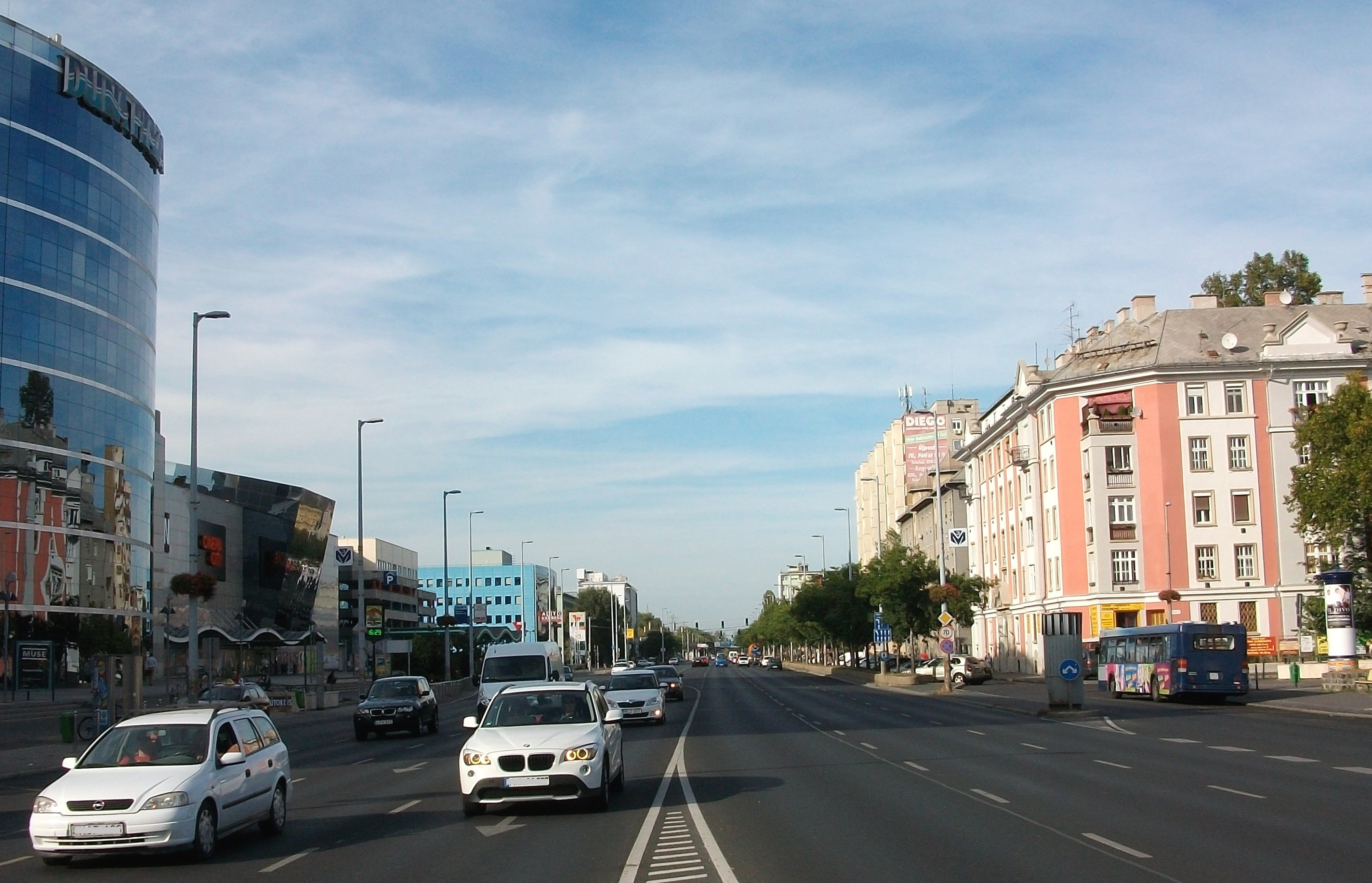
Váci Avenue above Gyöngyösi utca metro station

Váci út (Hungarian pronunciation: [ˈvaːt͡si ˈuːt], Váci Avenue, lit. Road to Vác) is one of the widest and busiest avenues in Budapest, Hungary. It is about 12 kilometers (7.5 mi) long and has four to eight traffic lanes.

== Location ==
It starts by the Grand Boulevard next to Nyugati Railway Station and runs to north in Angyalföld and Újpest - two populous former worker's district - crossing Dózsa György Avenue, Róbert Károly Boulevard and Árpád Avenue. There were several iron factories, tan-yards and clothes factories along Váci Avenue, it was one of the focal points of Hungarian workers' movement at the turn of the 20th century. The majority of factories closed after the end of communism in Hungary; banks, offices and other administrative buildings occupied former industrial areas.

Budapest Metro M3 runs under Váci Avenue, it has 7 metro stations from Nyugati pályaudvar to Újpest-városkapu (New Pest-City Gate, it was the city limit of Budapest before formation of Greater Budapest).

== Notable buildings ==
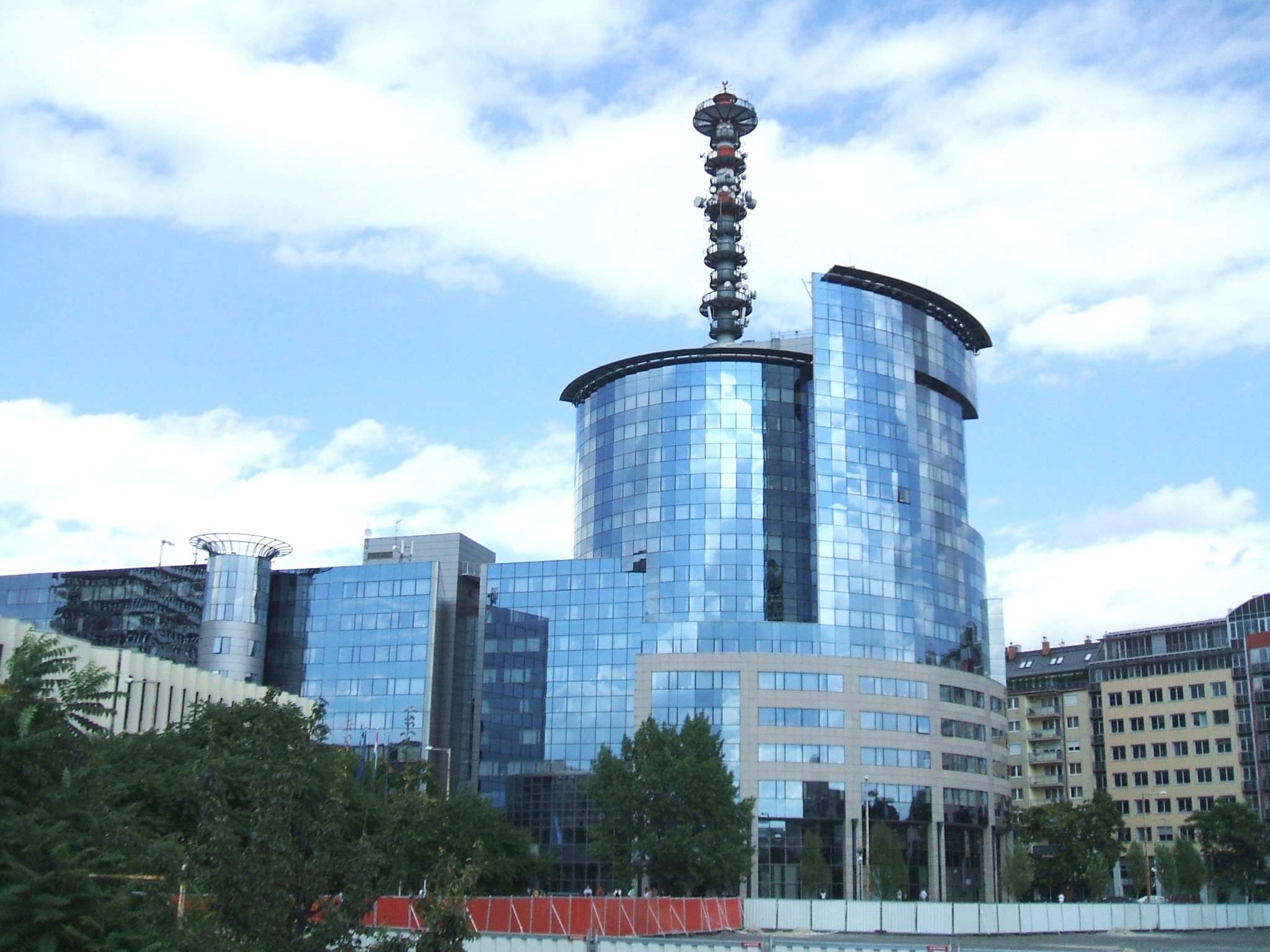
National Police HQ

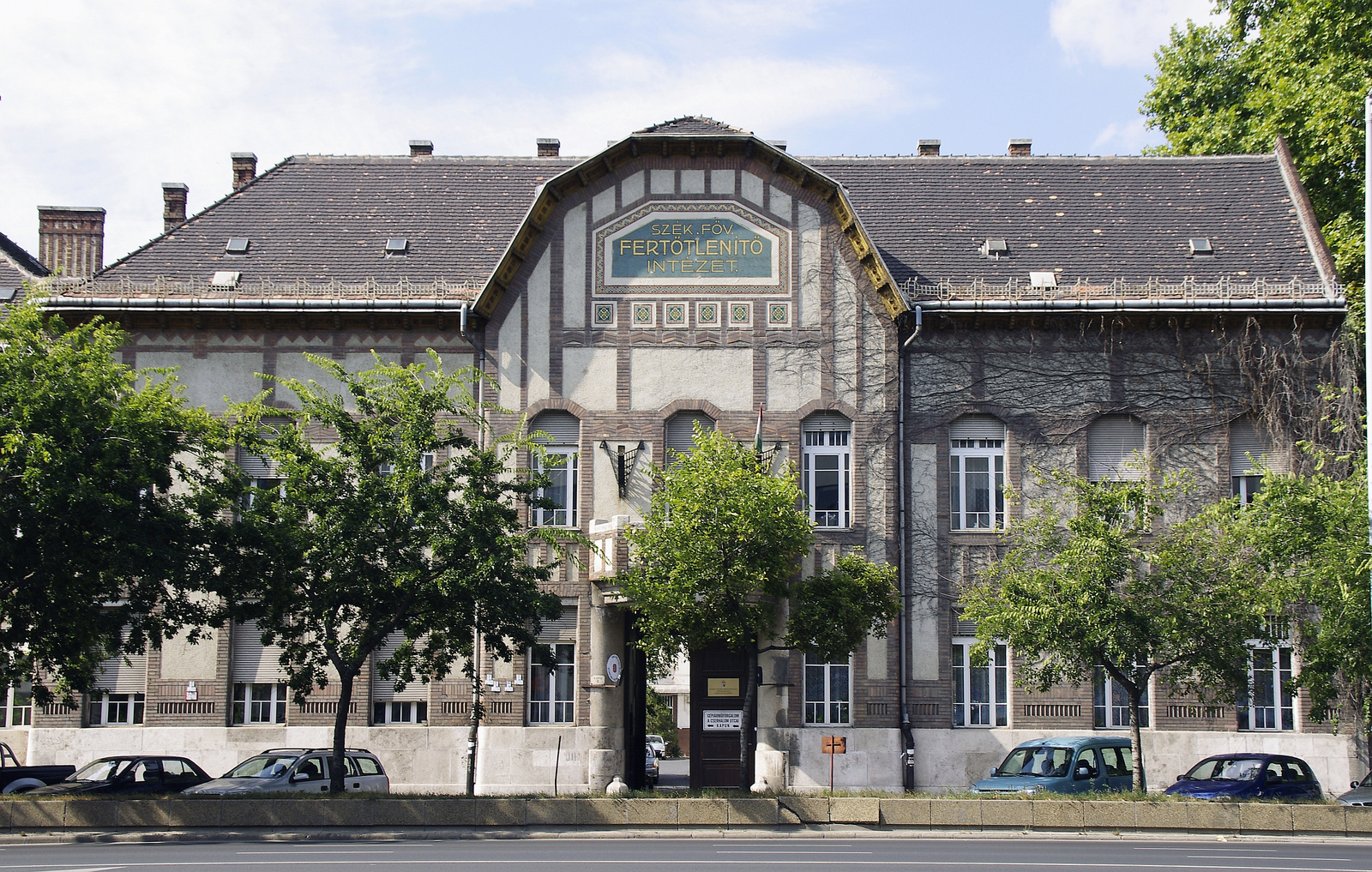
State Public Health and Medical Officer's Institution, sign on the building: Székesfővárosi Fertőtlenítő Intézet, lit.: Metropolitan Disinfecting Institution. Now the building is a national monument.

- Nyugati Railway Station (Nyugati pályaudvar)
- WestEnd City Center
- Lehel Market (Lehel piac, Lehel tér)
- Metropolitan Water Works HQ (Fővárosi Vízművek)
- Budapest Electrical Works HQ (Budapesti Elektromos Művek)
- Central Authenticate Office (Központi Okmányiroda)
- Árpád Bridge Bus Station (Árpád híd buszpályaudvar, suburban bus station)
- Attila József Theatre (József Attila Színház)
- National Police HQ - Metropolitan Police HQ - Pest County Police HQ (Országos Rendőrfőkapitányság, Budapesti Rendőrfőkapitányság, Pest Megyei Rendőrfőkapitányság)
- Hungarian State Treasury (Magyar Államkincstár)
- National Pension Insurance (Országos Nyugdíjbiztosítási Főigazgatóság)
- National Health Insurance (Országos Egészségbiztosítási Pénztár)
- Axa Bank Europe SA Hungarian HQ (Axa Bank Europe SA Magyarországi Fióktelepe)
- State Public Health and Medical Officer's Institution (Állami Népegészségügyi és Tisztiorvosi Szolgálat)
- Madarász Street Children's Hospital (Madarász utcai Gyermekkórház)
- Danube Mall (Duna Pláza)
- Church of Scientology of Budapest (Szcientológia Egyház Budapest)
- Budapest Bank HQ (Budapest Bank székháza)
- New Pest-City Gate (Újpest-Városkapu, a huge Stalinist building complex at the intersection of Váci Avenue and Árpád Avenue, Újpest-Városkapu metro station and Újpest-Városkapu bus terminal named after the building complex)
- New Pest-City Gate Bus Station (Újpest-Városkapu buszpályaudvar, suburban bus station)
- Tungsram

== Sources ==
- Budapest City Atlas, Dimap-Szarvas, Budapest, 2011, ISBN 978-963-03-9124-5
