= Batthyány tér metro station =

Budapest metro station

Batthyány tér
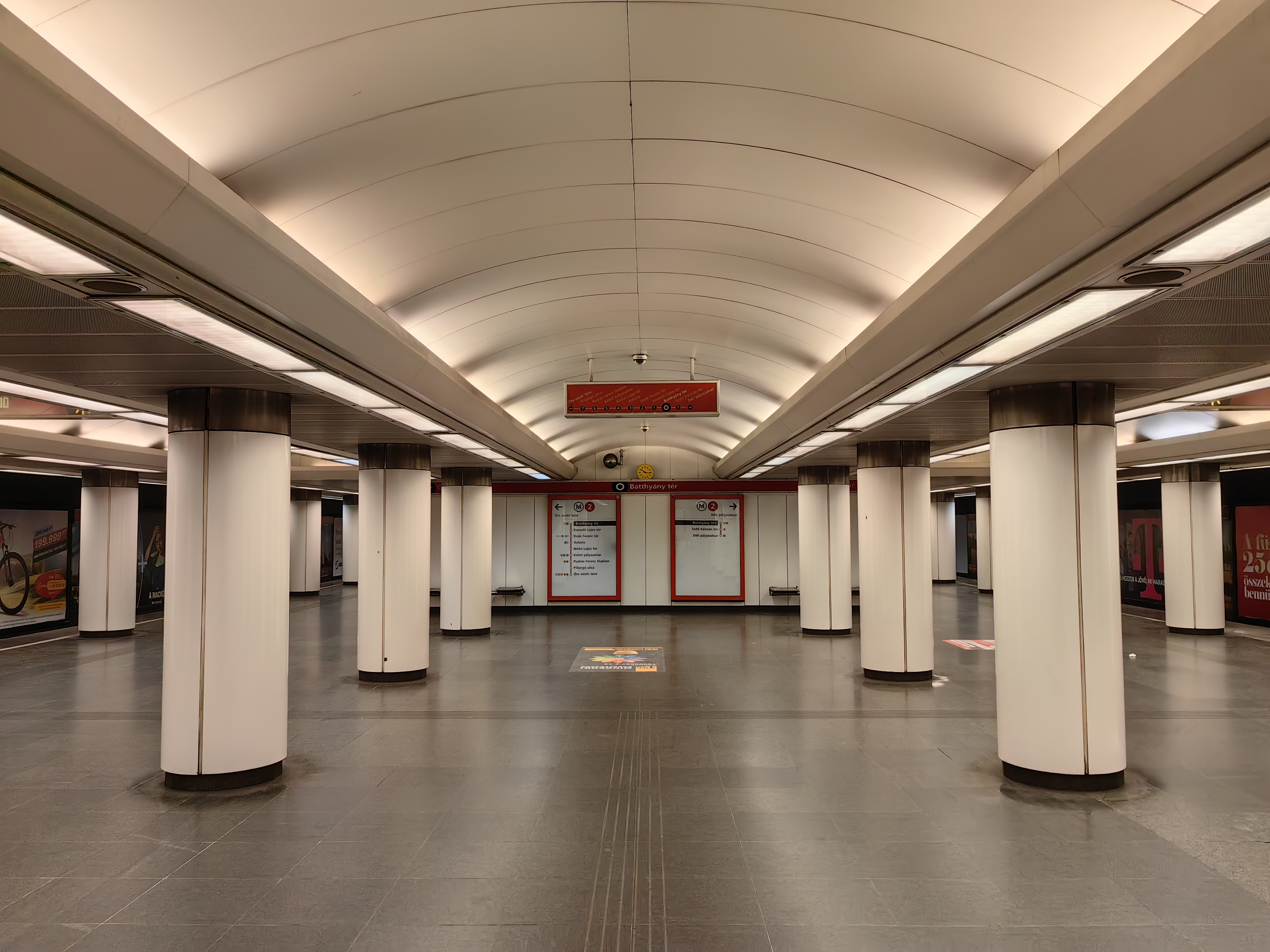

General information
- Location: Batthyány Square, Buda; Hungary
- Coordinates: 47°30′23″N 19°02′20″E
- System: Budapest Metro station
- Platforms: 1 island platform

Construction
- Structure type: bored underground
- Depth: 30.78 metres (101.0 ft)

History
- Opened: 22 December 1972

Services
Preceding station	Budapest Metro	Following station
Széll Kálmán tér towards Déli pályaudvar	Line 2	Kossuth Lajos tér towards Örs vezér tere
Location

Batthyány tér (Batthyány Square) is a station on the M2 (East-West) line of the Budapest Metro. It is located under Batthyány Square in Buda, immediately on the right bank of the Danube river. Next to the station, is the southern terminus of suburban railway line H5. The station was opened on 22 December 1972 as part of the extension of the line from Deák Ferenc tér to Déli pályaudvar.

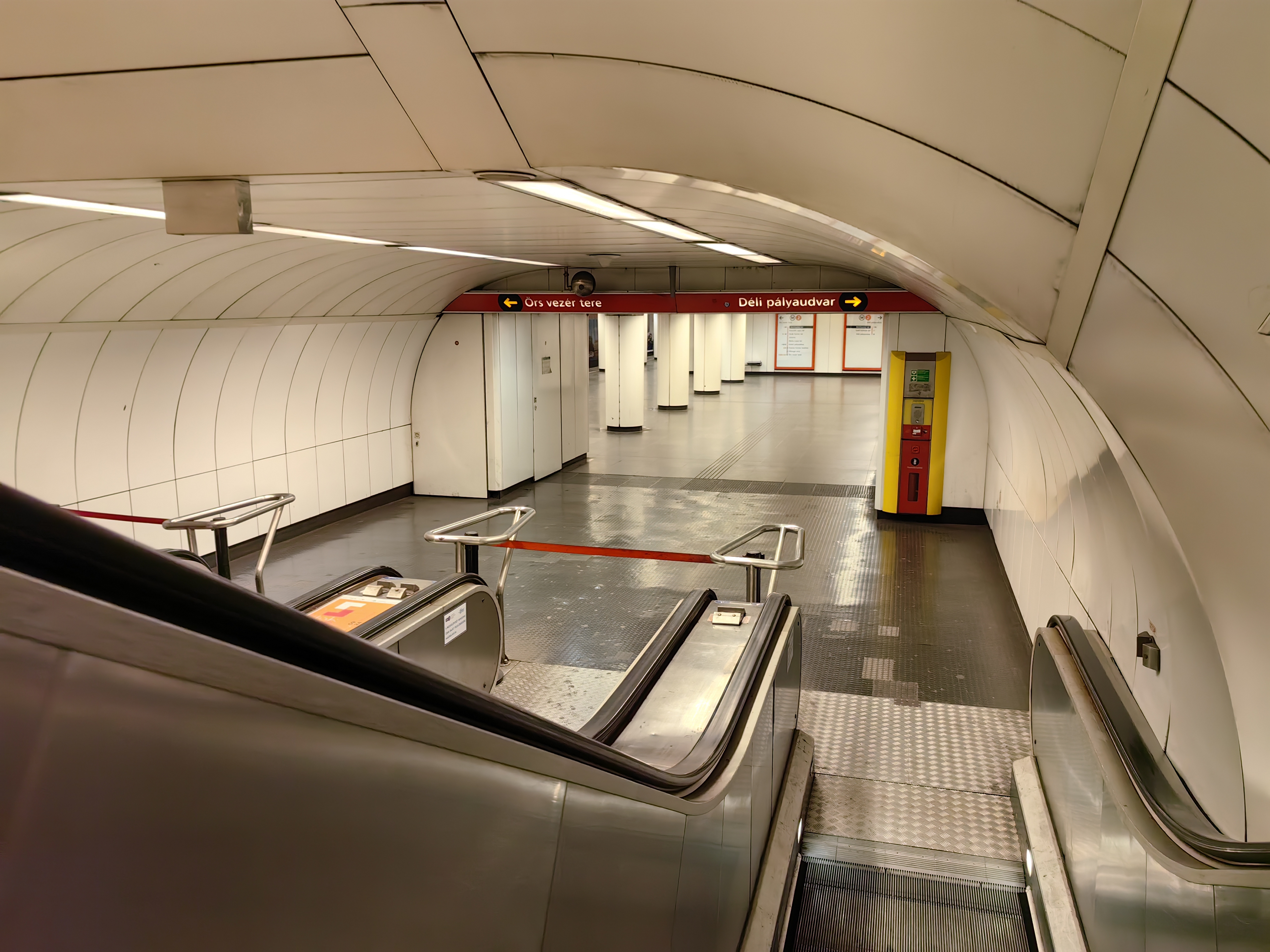

On the surface, there is a mall next to the Metro entrance, as well as the square itself. The station has two tram connections, to 19 and 41.

Passengers can get a good view of the Hungarian Parliament Building and the Chain Bridge from the riverbank.

== Connections ==
- Tram: 19, 41
- Bus: 11, 39, 111
