= Nyugati pályaudvar metro station =

Budapest metro station

Nyugati pályaudvar
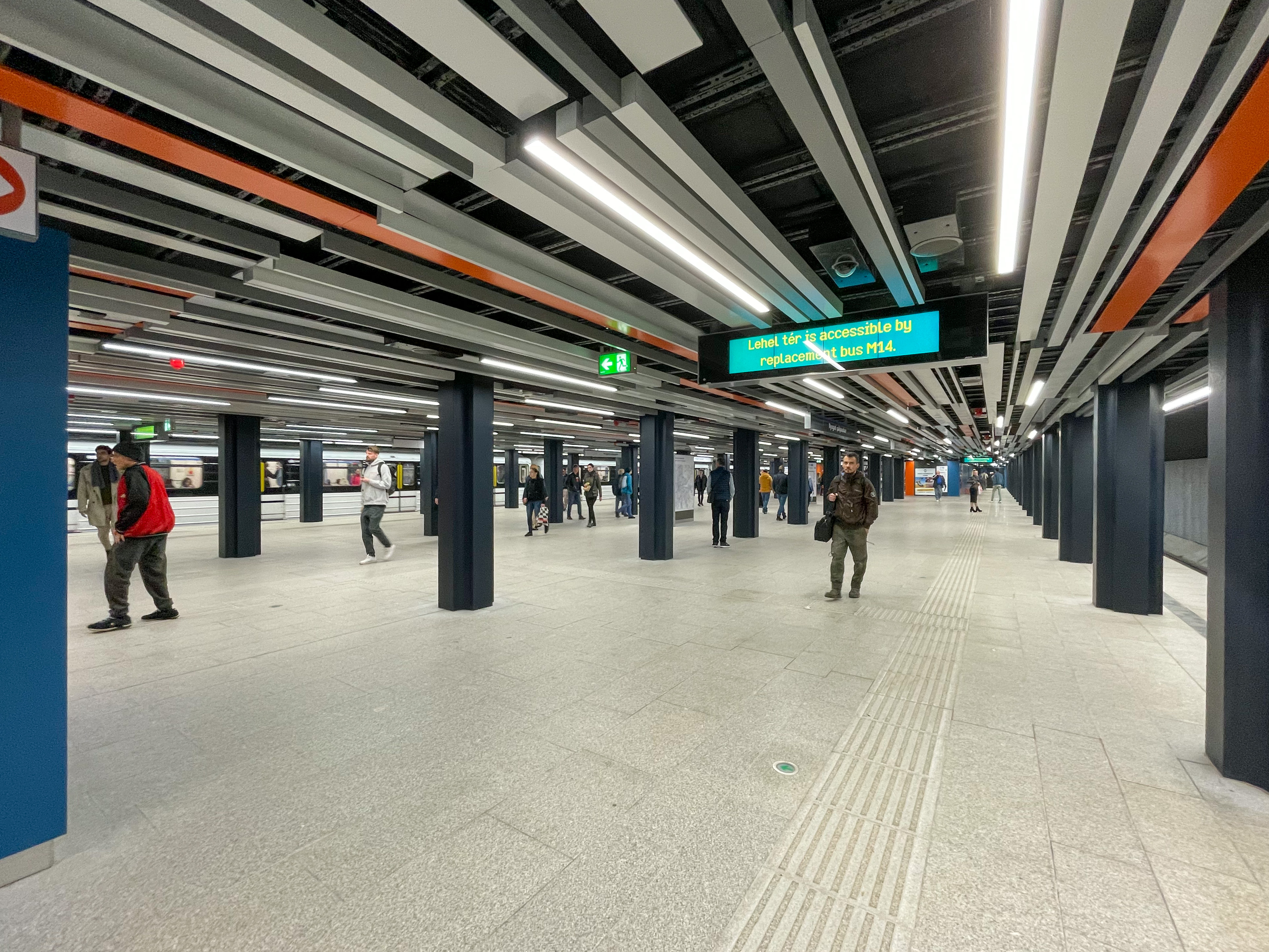

General information
- Location: Budapest; Hungary
- Coordinates: 47°30′41″N 19°03′24″E
- System: Budapest Metro station
- Platforms: 1 island platform

Construction
- Structure type: bored underground
- Depth: 25.76 m (84.5 ft)

History
- Opened: 30 December 1981
- Closed: 7 November 2020 temporarily
- Rebuilt: 20 March 2023

Services
Preceding station	Budapest Metro	Following station
Arany János utca towards Kőbánya-Kispest	Line 3	Lehel tér towards Újpest-központ
Location

Nyugati pályaudvar (Western Railway Station) is a station on the M3 (North-South) line of the Budapest Metro. It is nominally located on the borders of District V, District VI and District XIII, the station itself is under Váci Road at between its intersections with Grand Boulevard and Katona József Street. The station was opened on 30 December 1981 as part of the extension of the line from Deák Ferenc tér to Lehel tér. Its name was Marx tér (Marx Square) before 1990.

The station is one of the busiest on the line, as it provides connections to tram lines 4 and 6 on Grand Boulevard, including access to Buda via Margit Bridge. Also, it serves the adjacent namesake Nyugati Railway Station (regional and international lines).

== In popular culture ==
The station makes an appearances in the 2021 Marvel Cinematic Universe film Black Widow.

== Connections ==
- Bus: 9, 26, 91, 191, 226, 291
- Trolleybus: 72, 73
- Tram: 4, 6
- Rail: Nyugati Railway Station
