= Botond Bognar =

American architect

Botond Bognar is an American architect currently the Edgar A. Tafel Endowed Chair in Architecture at University of Illinois and also the Endowed Chair at University of Tokyo.
