= Göncz Árpád városközpont metro station =

Budapest metro station

Göncz Árpád városközpont
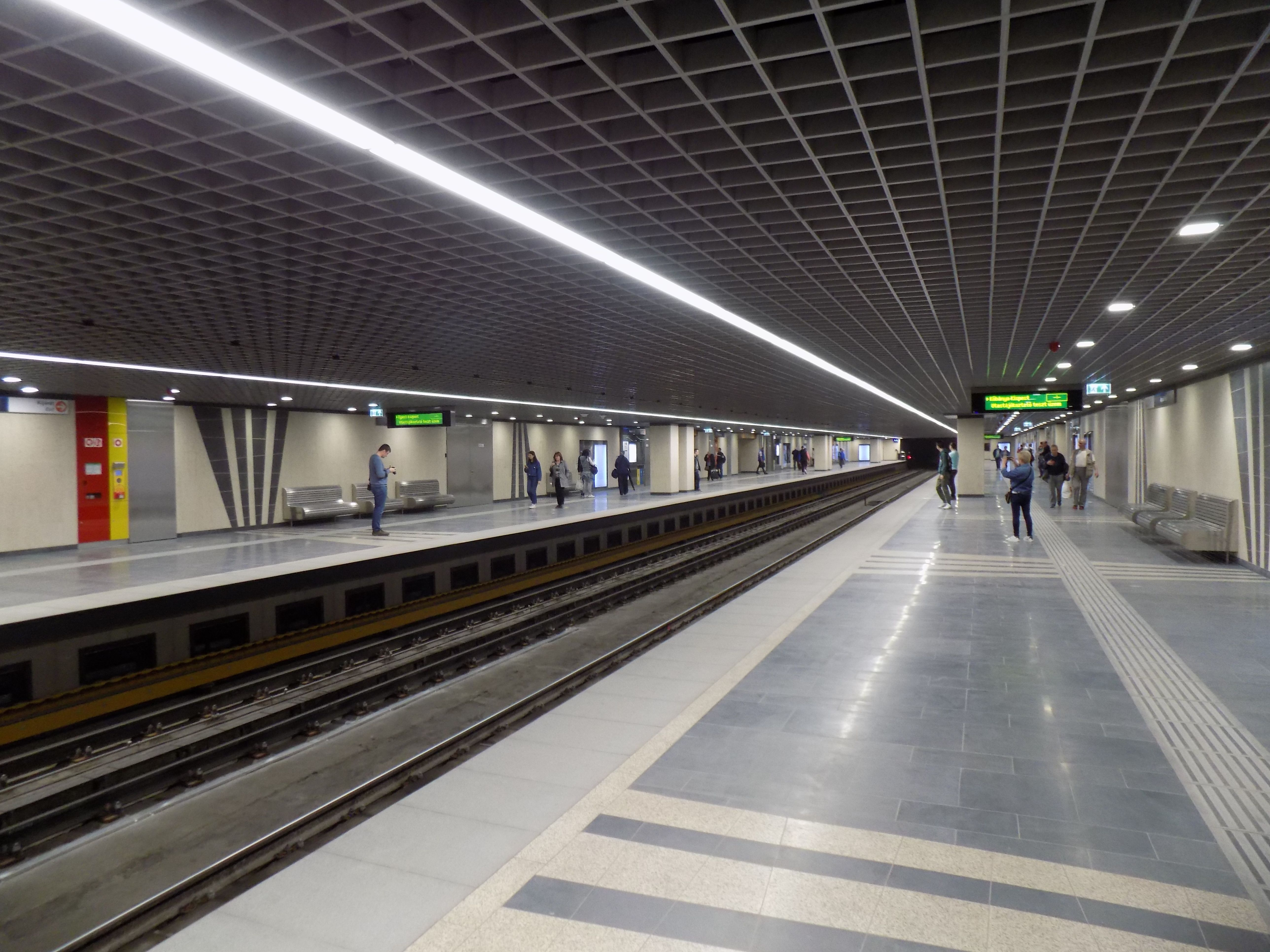

General information
- Location: Budapest, Hungary
- Coordinates: 47°31′58″N 19°04′02″E
- System: Budapest Metro station
- Platforms: 2 side platforms

Construction
- Structure type: Cut-and-cover underground
- Depth: 4.82 m (15.8 ft)

History
- Opened: 5 November 1984
- Rebuilt: 30 March 2019

Services
Preceding station	Budapest Metro	Following station
Dózsa György út towards Kőbánya-Kispest	Line 3	Forgách utca towards Újpest-központ
Location

Göncz Árpád városközpont (Árpád Göncz City Centre) is a station on the Budapest Metro Line 3 (North-South). It was the temporary terminus of Line 3 between 1984 and 1990.

The station was opened on 7 November 1984 as part of the extension from Lehel tér. On 14 December 1990 the line was extended further north to Újpest-központ.

The station is located beneath the intersection of Váci Avenue and Róbert Károly Boulevard, near Árpád bridge. It is also a major public transport hub.

The area has several high-rise offices and governmental buildings, including the headquarters of the Hungarian Police, the National Health Insurance Fund (Országos Egészségbiztosítási Pénztár), Hungarian State Treasury (Magyar Államkincstár) and the National Pension Insurance Directorate (Országos Nyugdíjbiztosítási Főigazgatóság).

From its inauguration until 31 January 2020, the station was called Árpád híd (Árpád Bridge). It then was renamed in honour of the former president of Hungary.

== Connections ==
- Bus: 26, 32, 34, 106, 120
- Regional buses: 800, 815, 820, 821, 830, 832, 840, 848
- Trolleybus: 79
- Tram: 1, 1A
