= Botond Előd =

Hungarian actor

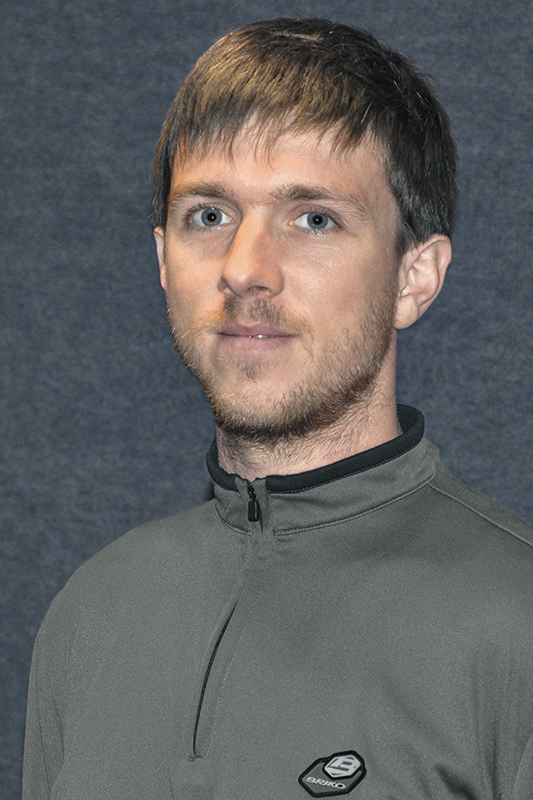
- Born: 24 October 1984 (age 41); Hungary
- Occupation: Voice Actor

Botond Előd (born 24 October 1984) is a Hungarian actor. He has an older brother named Álmos who is also a voice actor.

== Voice works ==
=== Live-action shows ===
- CSI: Miami
- 7th Heaven
- Entourage
- Stargate Atlantis
- Hannah Montana
- Tierra de Pasiones
- Jericho
- NCIS

=== Live action films ===
- Percy Jackson & the Olympians: The Lightning Thief
- Harry Potter and the Philosopher's Stone
- Harry Potter and the Goblet of Fire
- Harry Potter and the Order of the Phoenix
- American Pie Presents: The Naked Mile

=== Animated shows ===
- Naruto Uzumaki (Naruto, Animax edition)
- Bleach (manga)
- Full Metal Panic!
- Death Note
- Shaman King
- Kaleido Star
- Codename: Kids Next Door
- Love Com
- LaMB
