= Botond Csoma =

Romanian politician (born 1975)

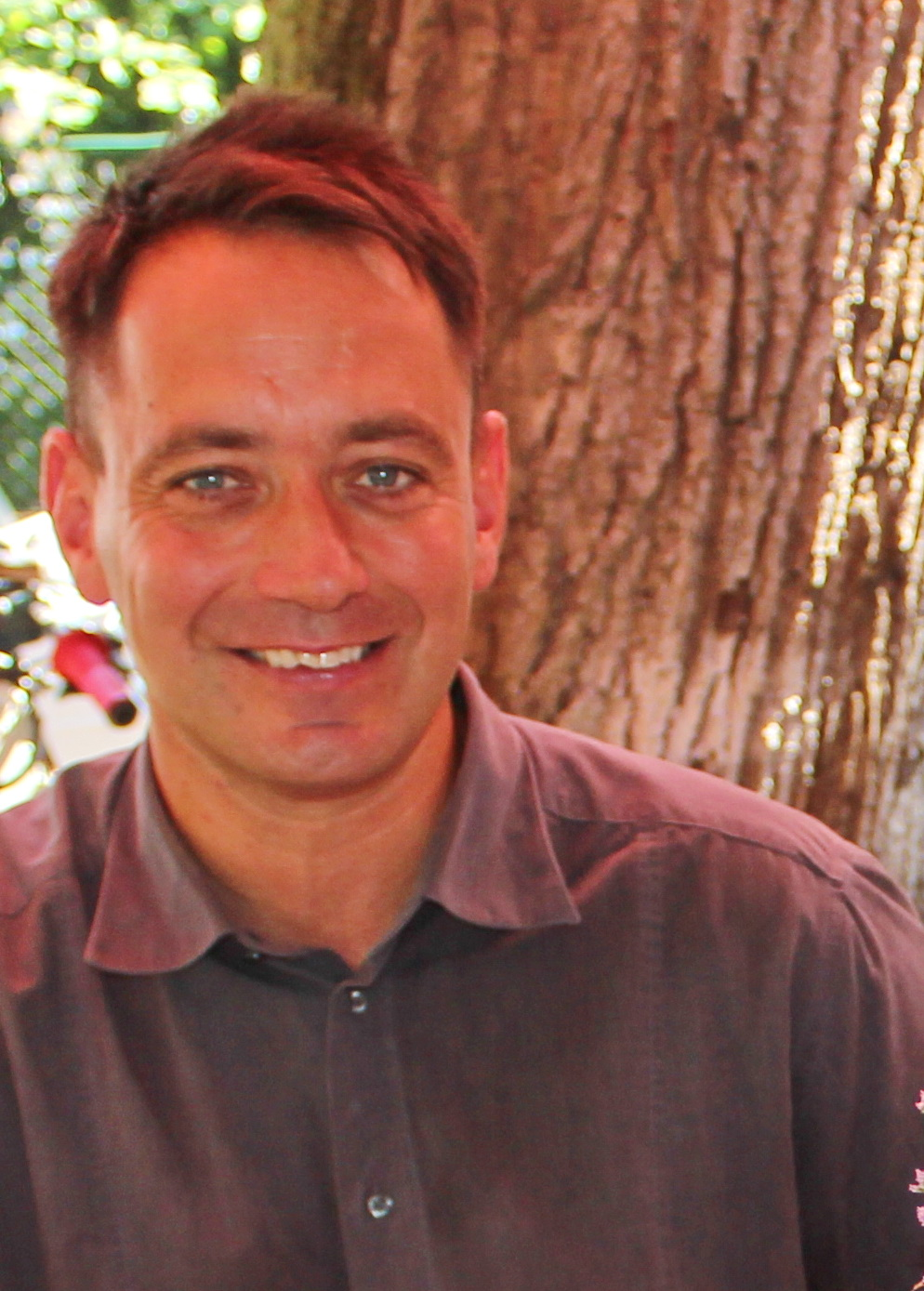

Member of the Chamber of Deputies
- Incumbent
- Assumed office 2016
- Constituency: 13th constituency of Cluj

Personal details
- Born: 18 February 1975 (age 51) Cluj-Napoca, Romania

Botond Csoma (born 18 February 1975) is a Romanian politician who is member of the Chamber of Deputies.

== Biography ==
He was elected in 2016.
