= Batthyány Square =

Square in Budapest, Hungary

Coordinates: 47°30′22.4″N 19°2′19.04″E

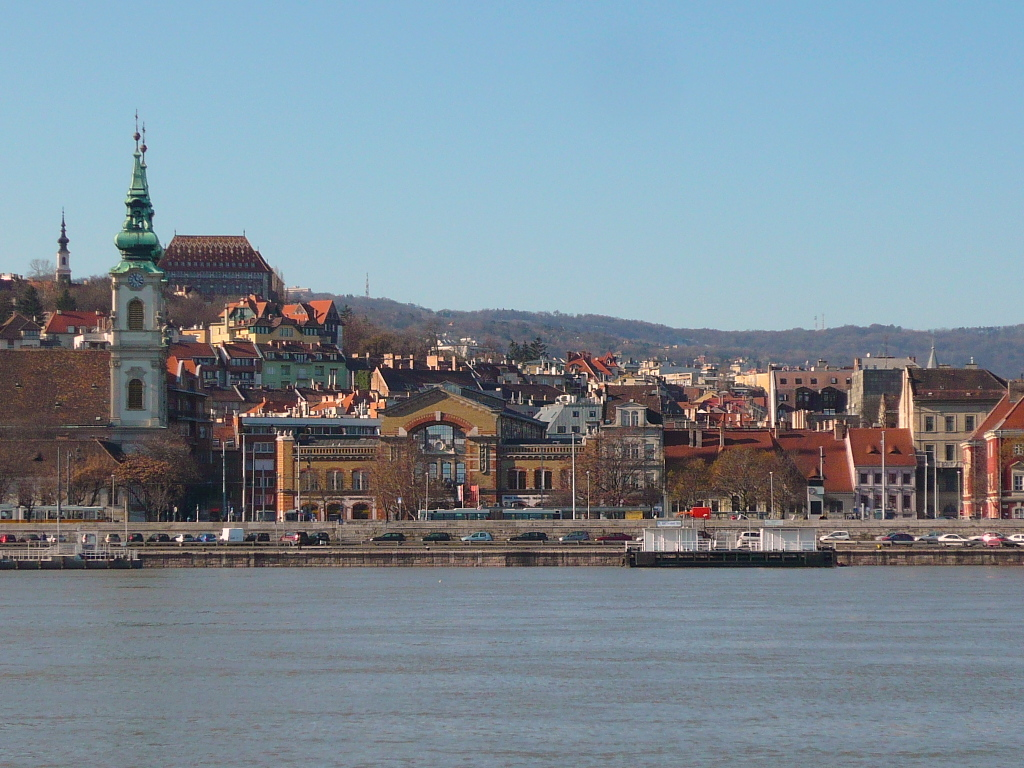
Batthyány Square from Pest

Batthyány Square (Hungarian: Batthyány tér, pronounced [ˈbɒcːaːɲi ˈteːr]) is a town square in Budapest. It is located on the Buda side of the Danube directly opposite the Hungarian Parliament Building. It is named after Lajos Batthyány, the first Prime Minister of Hungary, and a statue for him was erected in 2008.

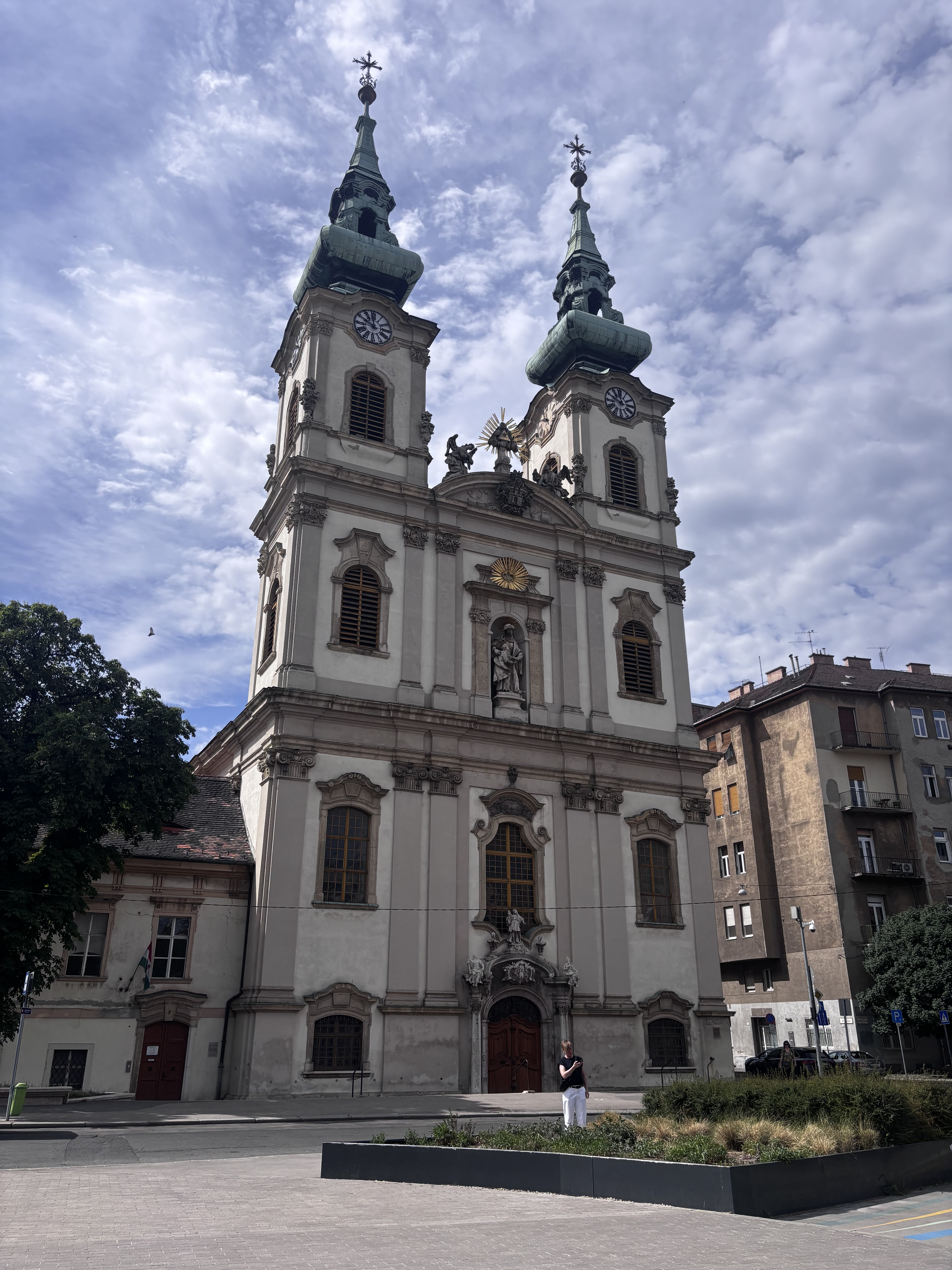
The church of Saint Anne

Batthyány Square is noted for the Szent Anna-templom (Church of Saint Anne, Budapest), a church built by the Jesuits between 1740 and 1761, and one of Budapest's most beautiful baroque buildings. The square is also known for its market hall.

The historic Fő utca (Main Street) crosses the square, and connects the lower end of the Budapest Castle Hill Funicular to the Buda end of the Széchenyi Chain Bridge. The French Institute of Budapest is also located nearby.

== Transport ==
Batthyány tér station is served by the M2 (East-West) line of the Budapest Metro. The HÉV suburban railway originates from here, connecting Batthyány Square with Szentendre.
