= Lehel tér metro station =

Budapest metro station

Lehel tér
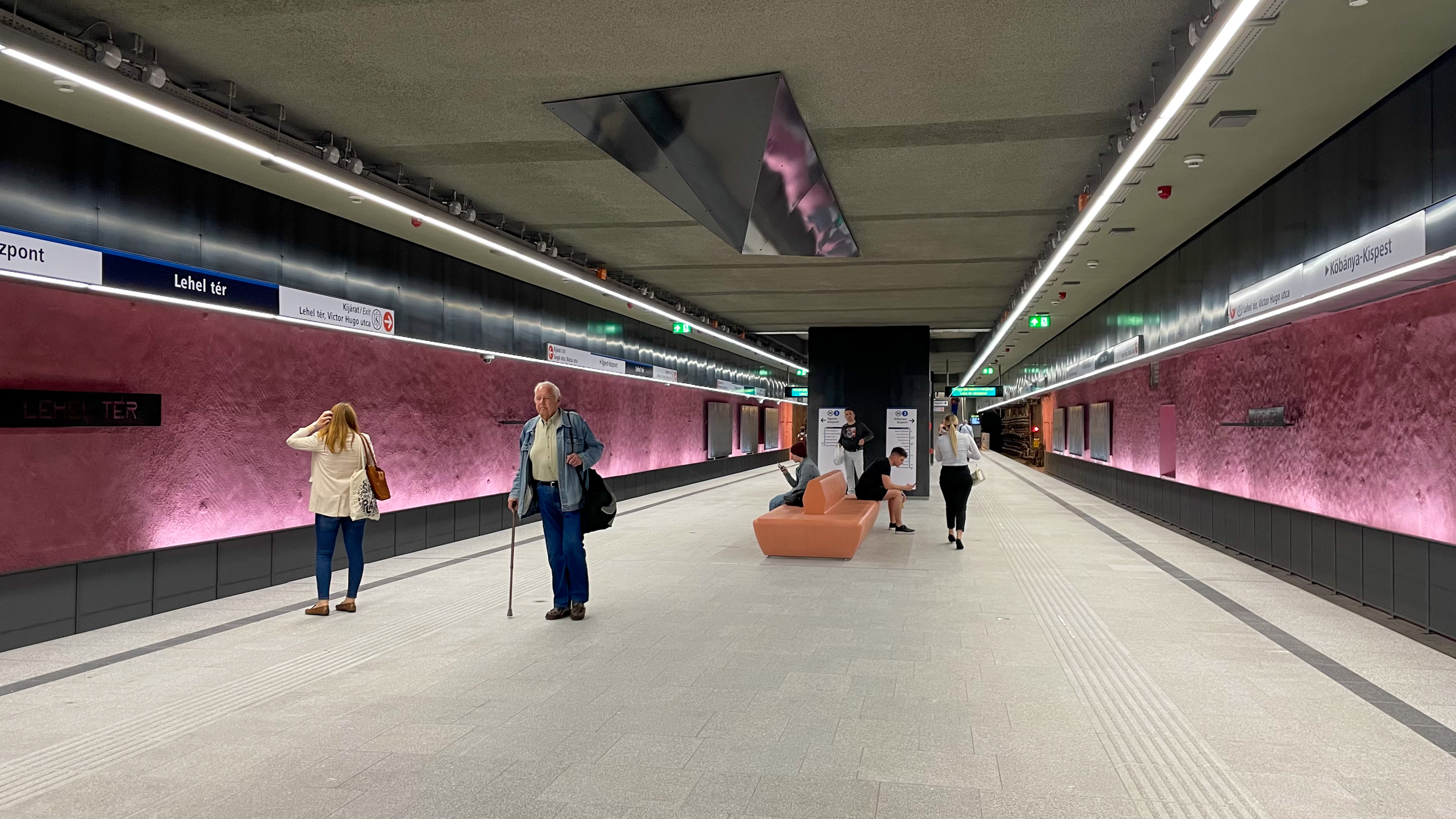

General information
- Location: Budapest, Hungary
- Coordinates: 47°31′03″N 19°03′38″E
- System: Budapest Metro station
- Platforms: 1 island platform

Construction
- Structure type: Cut-and-cover underground
- Depth: 9.3 m (31 ft)

History
- Opened: 30 December 1981
- Closed: 14 May 2022
- Rebuilt: 22 May 2023

Services
Preceding station	Budapest Metro	Following station
Nyugati pályaudvar towards Kőbánya-Kispest	Line 3	Dózsa György út towards Újpest-központ
Location

Lehel tér is a station on the Budapest Metro M3 line. It opened on 30 December 1981 with the third phase of the M3 rollout. It was the first phase to run northbound from Deák tér on the line. The station's name comes from the square under which it is located. Consequently, from 1981 to 1990, the station was called Élmunkás tér, after which the square and the station changed to Lehel tér for the Hungarian chieftain Lehel.

The station was opened on 30 December 1981 as part of the extension of the line from Deák Ferenc tér. It was the temporary terminus of Line 3 between 1981 and 1984. On 7 November 1984, the line was extended to Árpád híd.

== Connections ==
- Bus: 15
- Trolleybus: 76
- Tram: 14
