= Angyalföld =

Neighborhood in Budapest, Hungary

Coordinates: 47°32′N 19°04′E

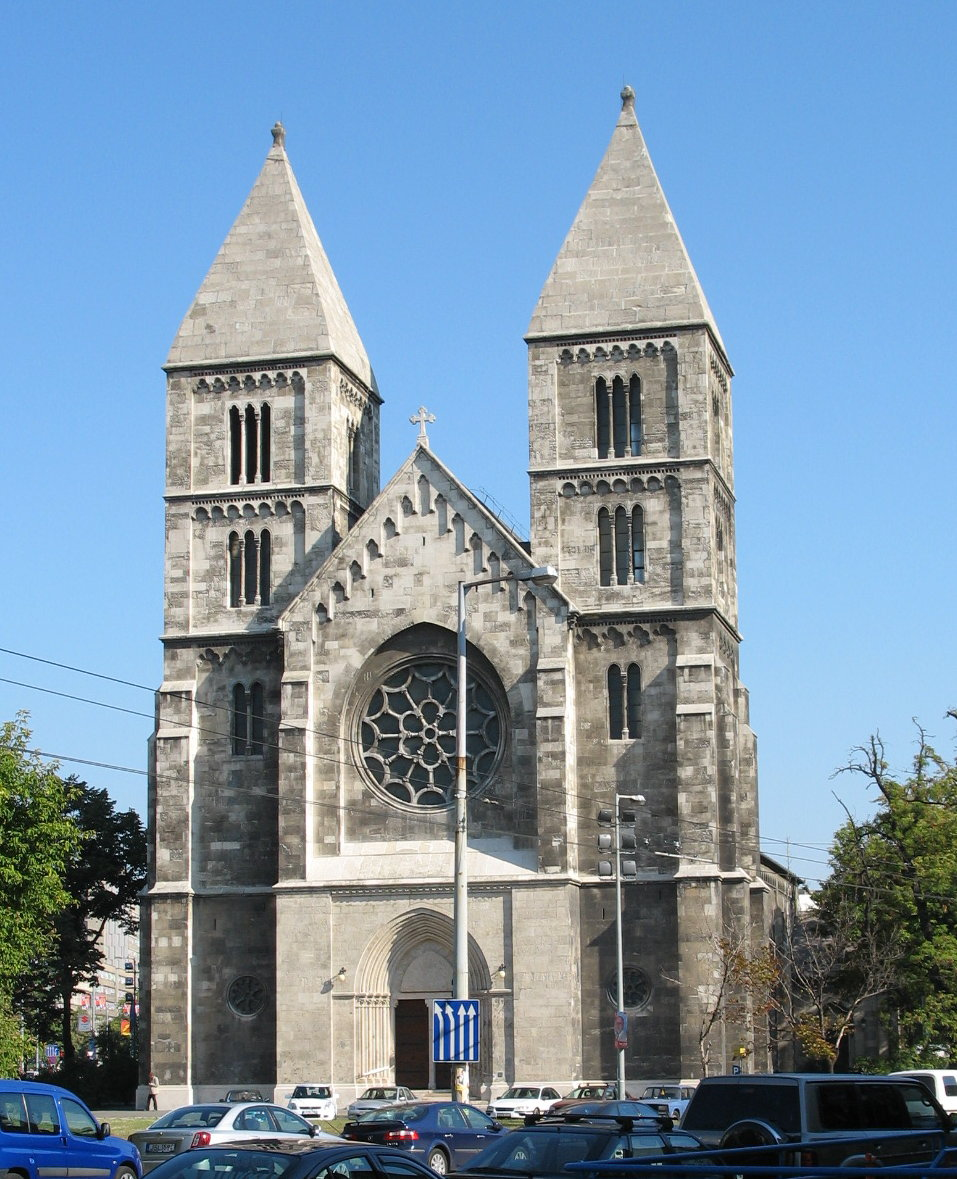
Church

Angyalföld (German: Engelsfeld; literally: "Angel's Field or Angel Land") is a neighbourhood in Budapest, Hungary. Administratively it belongs to the 13th district. The traditionally working-class neighbourhood went through a process of gentrification due to the office-building boom of the 1990s.

== Location ==
Angyalföld is located in the northern part of Pest, between the Danube and the railway lines.

The borders of Angyalföld are: the railway line from the Danube – Új Palotai út – Dugonics utca – Madridi utca – Szent László út – Kámfor utca – Tatai utca – Szegedi út – railway line towards Vác – Bulcsu utca – Lehel utca – Lehel tér (eastern and western sides) – Váci út – Meder utca – the Danube until the railway line.

== Name ==
The original German name of the area, Engelsfeld was first mentioned in the 1830s. The origin of the name is uncertain. Most probable it relates to the Engl family, originally from South Tirol. The name Engl can be found in the register of population of the outskirts of Terézváros, drawn up during the census of the 1770s. In this register Stefan Engl was registered as old vineyard owner. Since his lands maybe were called Engelsfeld, the name Angyalföld can be its direct translation. It had a narrower meaning because the names of three smaller neighbourhoods (Erdőtelkek, Felsőbikarét, Lőportárdűlő) were not revived after 1990. They became part of Angyalföld.
