= Újpest-központ metro station =

Budapest metro station

Újpest-központ
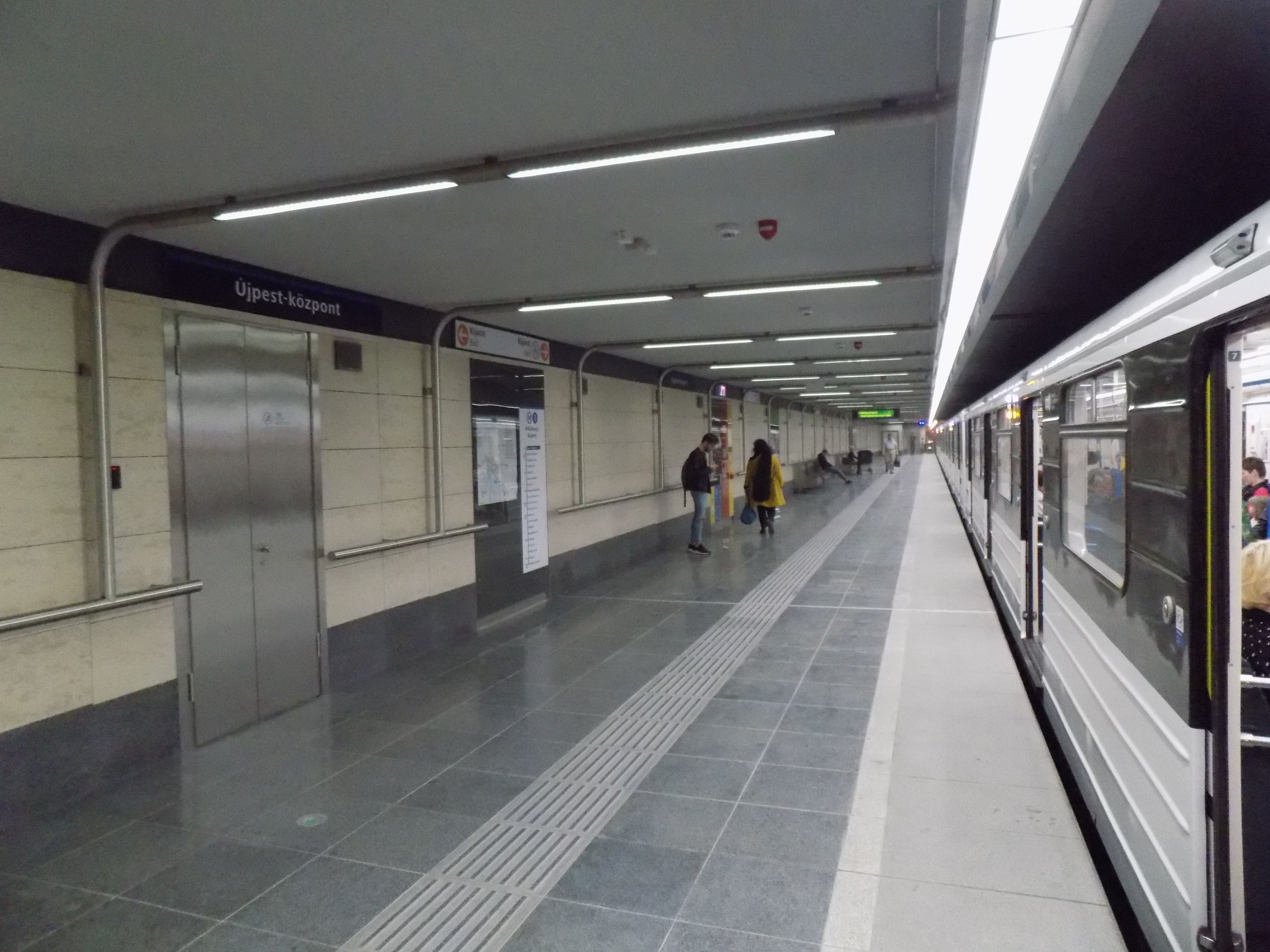

General information
- Location: Budapest, Hungary
- Coordinates: 47°33′38″N 19°05′25″E
- System: Budapest Metro station
- Platforms: 2 side platforms

Construction
- Structure type: Cut-and-cover underground
- Depth: 8.27 m (27.1 ft)

History
- Opened: 14 December 1990
- Rebuilt: 30 March 2019

Services
Preceding station	Budapest Metro	Following station
Újpest-városkapu towards Kőbánya-Kispest	Line 3	Terminus
Location

Újpest-központ (lit. Újpest-Centrum) is the northern terminus of the Budapest Metro Line 3 (North–south line). It is located beneath a busy intersection, the most important public transport hub in Újpest district.

The station directly serves Újpest and Káposztásmegyer microraions, but the terminus attracts commuters from throughout Rákospalota, Újpalota and the northeastern suburbs.

The station was initially planned to be a temporary terminus, much like Árpád híd when that station was built, but the line was never extended to Káposztásmegyer and it has been the terminus since opening on 14 December 1990 as part of the extension from Árpád híd.

== Connections ==
- Bus: 25, 30, 30A, 104, 104A, 120, 147, 170, 196, 196A, 204, 220, 230, 270
- Regional bus: 308, 309, 310, 313, 314, 315, 316, 317, 318, 319, 320, 321
- Tram: 12, 14
