= Fővám tér metro station =

Budapest metro station

Fővám tér
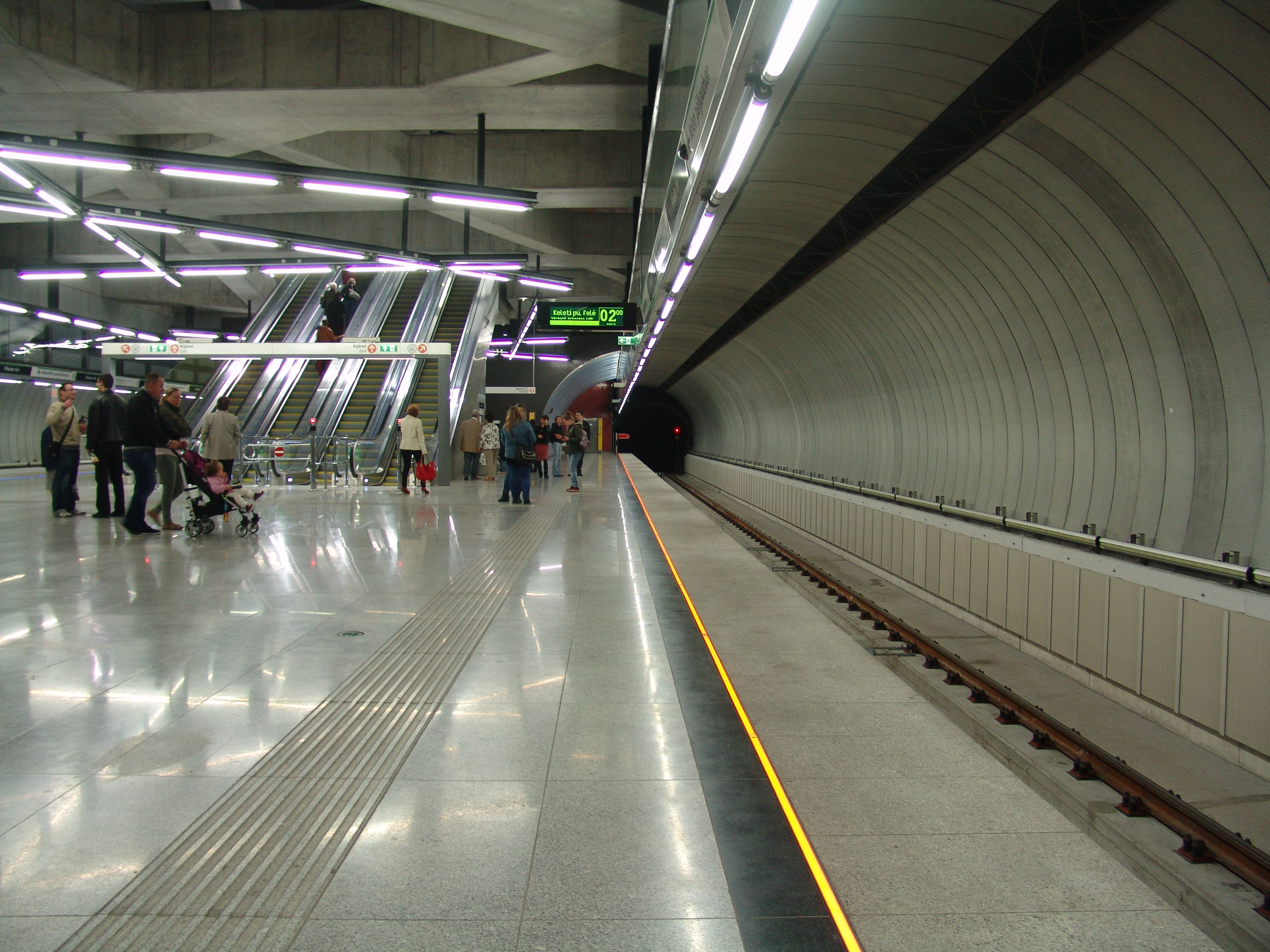

General information
- Location: Budapest; Hungary
- Coordinates: 47°29′10″N 19°03′27″E
- System: Budapest Metro station
- Platforms: 1 island platform

Construction
- Structure type: Mixed underground
- Depth: 30.0 metres (98.4 ft)

History
- Opened: 28 March 2014

Services
Preceding station	Budapest Metro	Following station
Szent Gellért tér – Műegyetem towards Kelenföld vasútállomás	Line 4	Kálvin tér towards Keleti pályaudvar
Location

Fővám tér is a station of Line 4 of the Budapest Metro, located beneath the eponymous square. The tunnels, on the other side of Szabadság Bridge, go under the Danube and continue in Pest under Corvinus University. The station was opened on 28 March 2014 as part of the inaugural section of the line, from Keleti pályaudvar to Kelenföld vasútállomás.

== Connections ==
- Bus: 15, 223E
- Trolleybus: 83
- Tram: 2, 2B, 23, 47, 48, 49
