= Móricz Zsigmond körtér =

Square in Budapest, Hungary

Coordinates: 47°28′37.77″N 19°2′48.40″E

Móricz Zsigmond körtér (Hungarian pronunciation: [ˈmoːrit͡s ˈʒiɡmond ˈkørteːr], "Zsigmond Móricz circus") is a square in Budapest, Hungary.

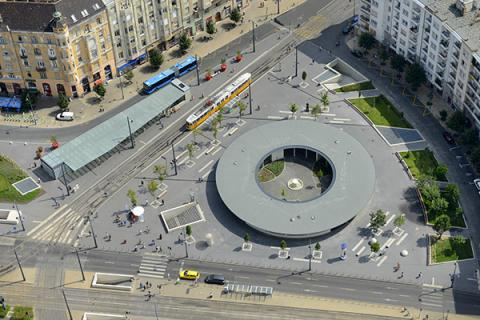
Aerial photo of the square's "mushroom"

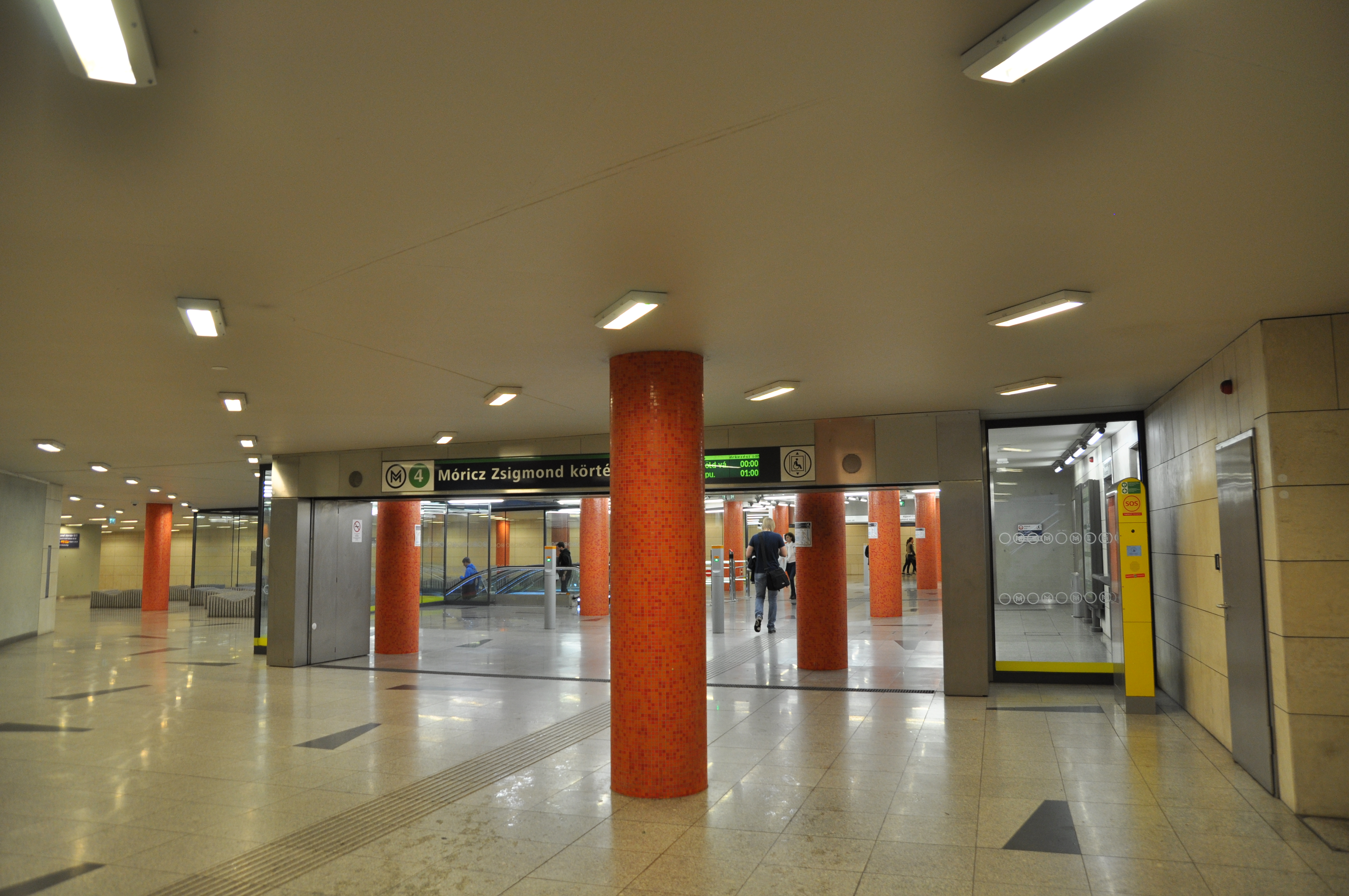
Underpass and metro entrance on the square

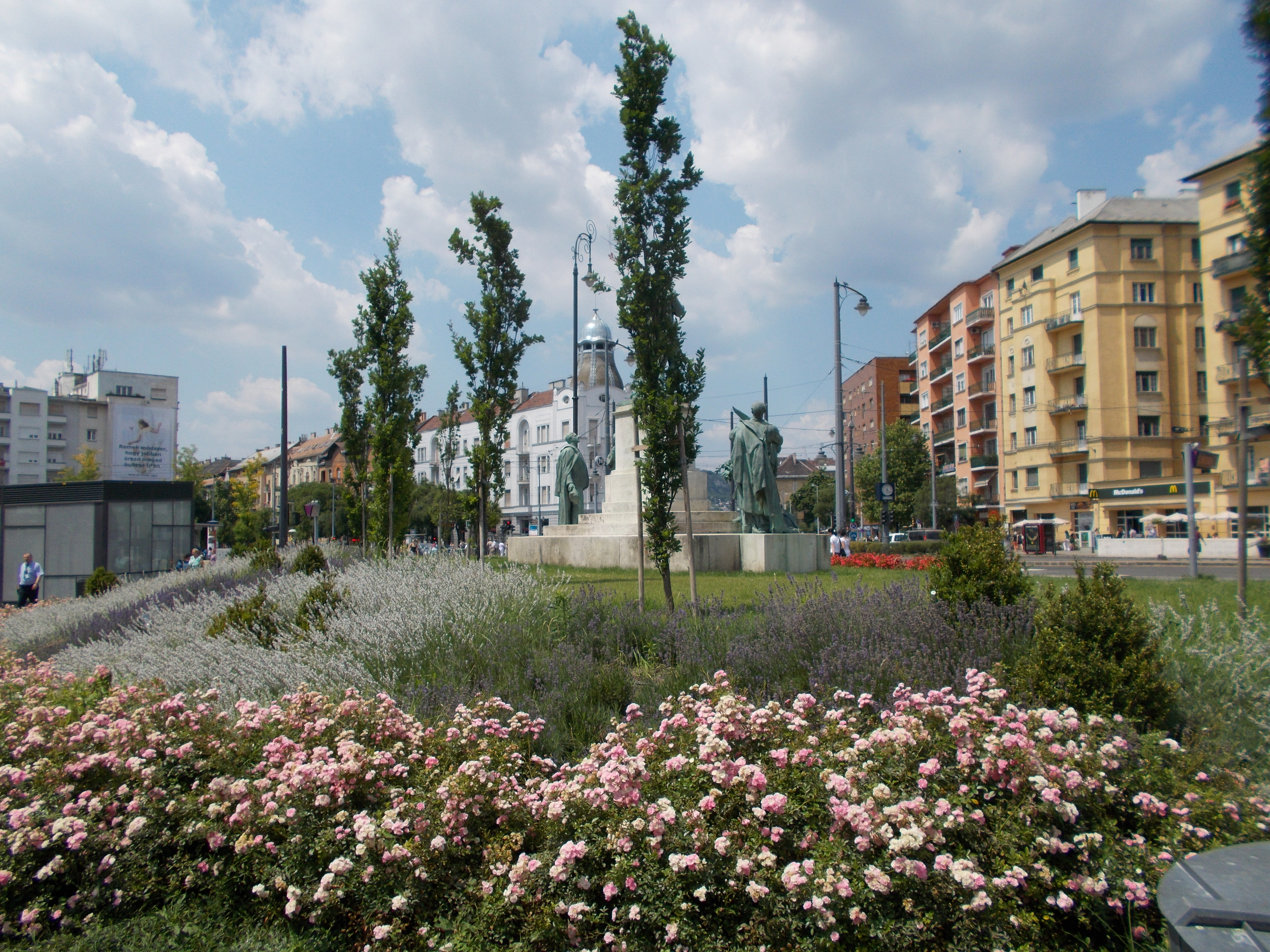
Garden with statue of Prince St. Emeric on the square

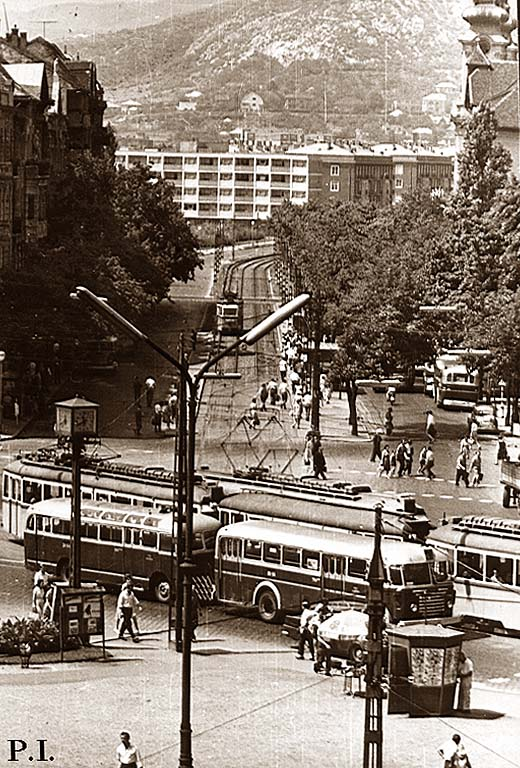
Historic photo of the square (1960)

Located in Újbuda, or Budapest's 11th District at the convergence of some of Budapest's major boulevards Béla Bartók út, Villányi út, Fehérvári út, and Karinthy Frigyes út, the square is near the River Danube. From 1929, the square was initially named after Miklós Horthy, but was renamed after famous Hungarian writer Zsigmond Móricz in 1945. It remains a prominent location within the city, and was a scene of fierce fighting in the 1956 Hungarian Revolution.

The main feature of the intersection is the Gomba, or Mushroom. This building, constructed in 1942 in the middle of the roundabout, featured shops as well as the electrical transformer distributing current to the significant tramway network. As it was in poor condition, the mushroom was earmarked for redevelopment in line with Budapest's cultural district and construction of the M4 metro. The building was fully renovated by the summer of 2014.

Budapest's new M4 metro has a stop at the square, as well as the 7, 27, 33, 58, 114, 213, 214, and 240 bus lines and the 6, 17, 19, 41, 47, 48, 49, 56, 56A, and 61 tram lines, the 6 tram line being the busiest tram service in Budapest (along with 4). The shopping mall Allee (toward Újbuda-központ metro station) and the square Kosztolányi Dezső tér along with its park around Feneketlen-tó ("Bottomless Lake") are available at a walking distance.

== See also ==
- Móricz Zsigmond körtér (Budapest Metro)
- Széll Kálmán tér
