= Rákóczi tér metro station =

Budapest metro station

Rákóczi tér
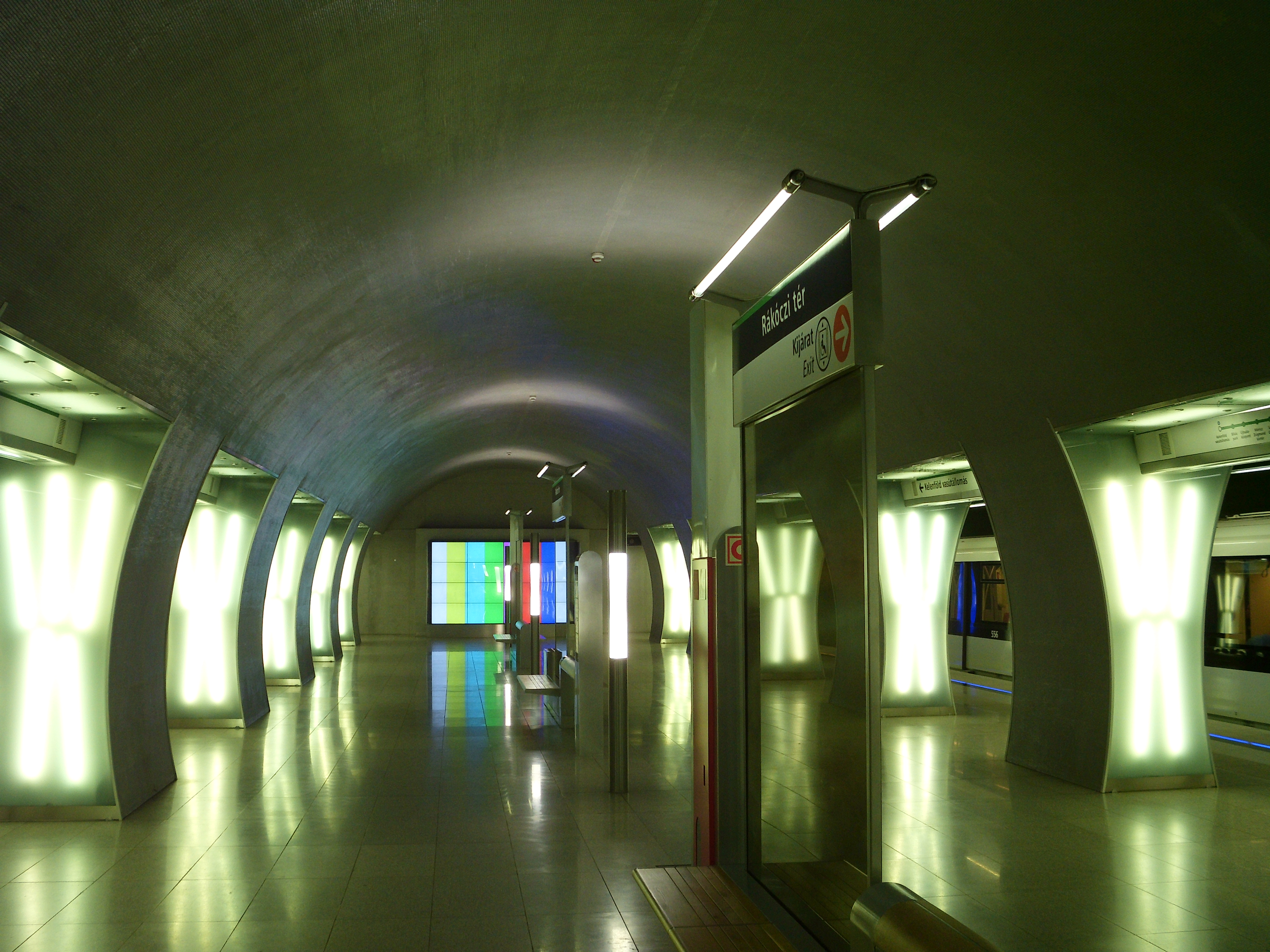

General information
- Location: Budapest; Hungary
- Coordinates: 47°29′34″N 19°04′20″E
- System: Budapest Metro station
- Platforms: 1 island platform

Construction
- Structure type: Mixed underground
- Depth: 23.0 metres (75.5 ft)

History
- Opened: 28 March 2014

Services
Preceding station	Budapest Metro	Following station
Kálvin tér towards Kelenföld vasútállomás	Line 4	II. János Pál pápa tér towards Keleti pályaudvar
Location

Rákóczi tér is a station on Line 4 of the Budapest Metro. It is located beneath the eponymous square, named after Francis II Rákóczi. The station was opened on 28 March 2014 as part of the inaugural section of the line, from Keleti pályaudvar to Kelenföld vasútállomás.

The station was decorated red, white and green (the colours of the Hungarian flag) and designed with the names of the former domains of Francis II Rákóczi.

== Connections ==
- Tram: 4, 6
