= Móricz Zsigmond körtér metro station =

Budapest metro station

Móricz Zsigmond körtér
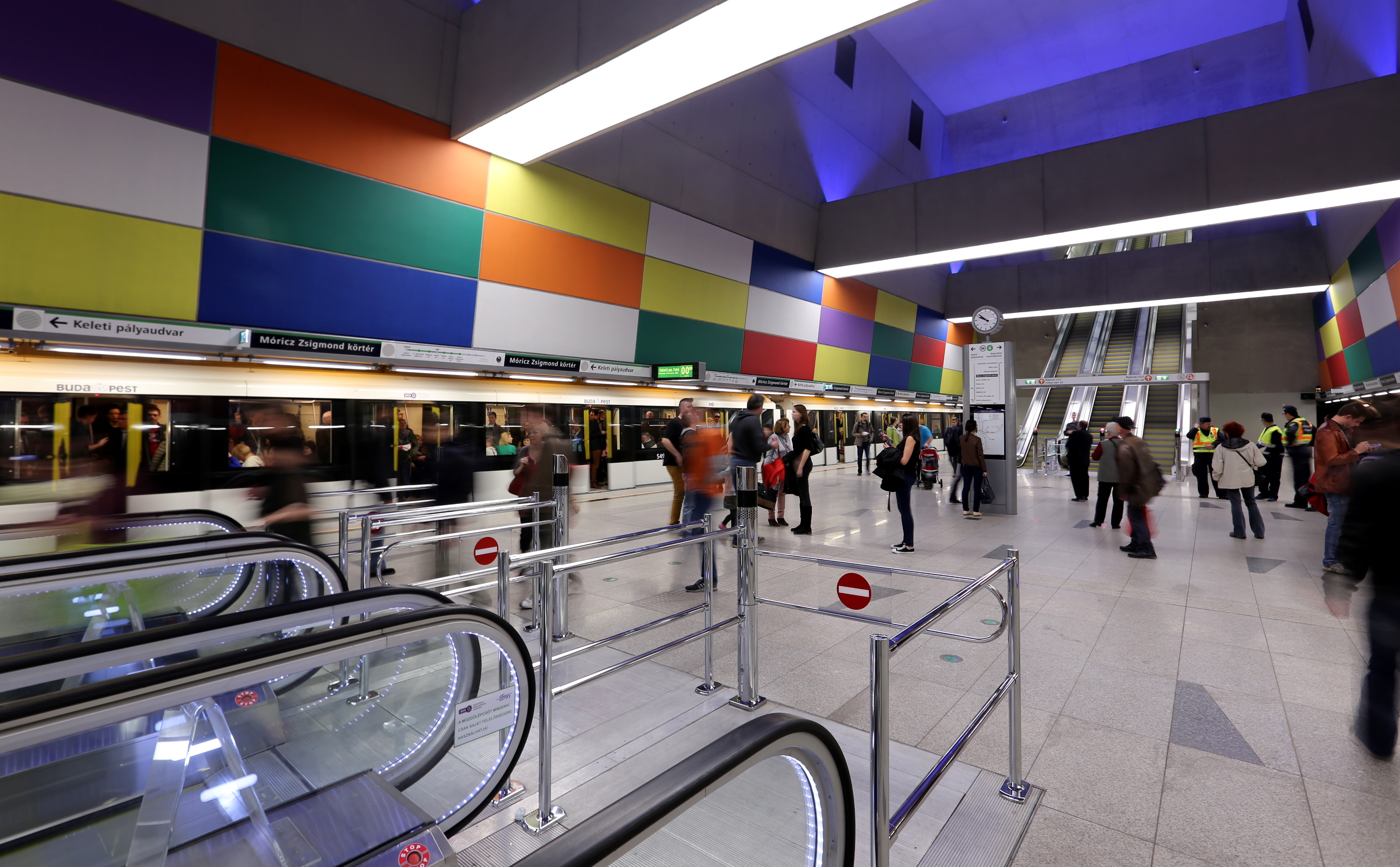

General information
- Location: Budapest; Hungary
- Coordinates: 47°28′38″N 19°02′51″E
- System: Budapest Metro station
- Platforms: 1 island platform

Construction
- Structure type: Mixed underground
- Depth: 24.0 metres (78.7 ft)

History
- Opened: 28 March 2014

Services
Preceding station	Budapest Metro	Following station
Újbuda-központ towards Kelenföld vasútállomás	Line 4	Szent Gellért tér – Műegyetem towards Keleti pályaudvar
Location

Móricz Zsigmond körtér is a station of Line 4 of the Budapest Metro. It is located beneath the eponymous square, and is a major public transport hub in Buda along with Széll Kálmán tér. It is also the southern terminus of Tramline 6. The station was opened on 28 March 2014 as part of the inaugural section of the line, from Keleti pályaudvar to Kelenföld vasútállomás.

== Connections ==
- Bus: 7, 27, 33, 33A, 58, 114, 213, 214, 240
- Tram: 6, 17, 19, 41, 47, 48, 49, 56, 56A, 61
