= Szent Gellért tér – Műegyetem metro station =

Budapest metro station

Szent Gellért tér – Műegyetem
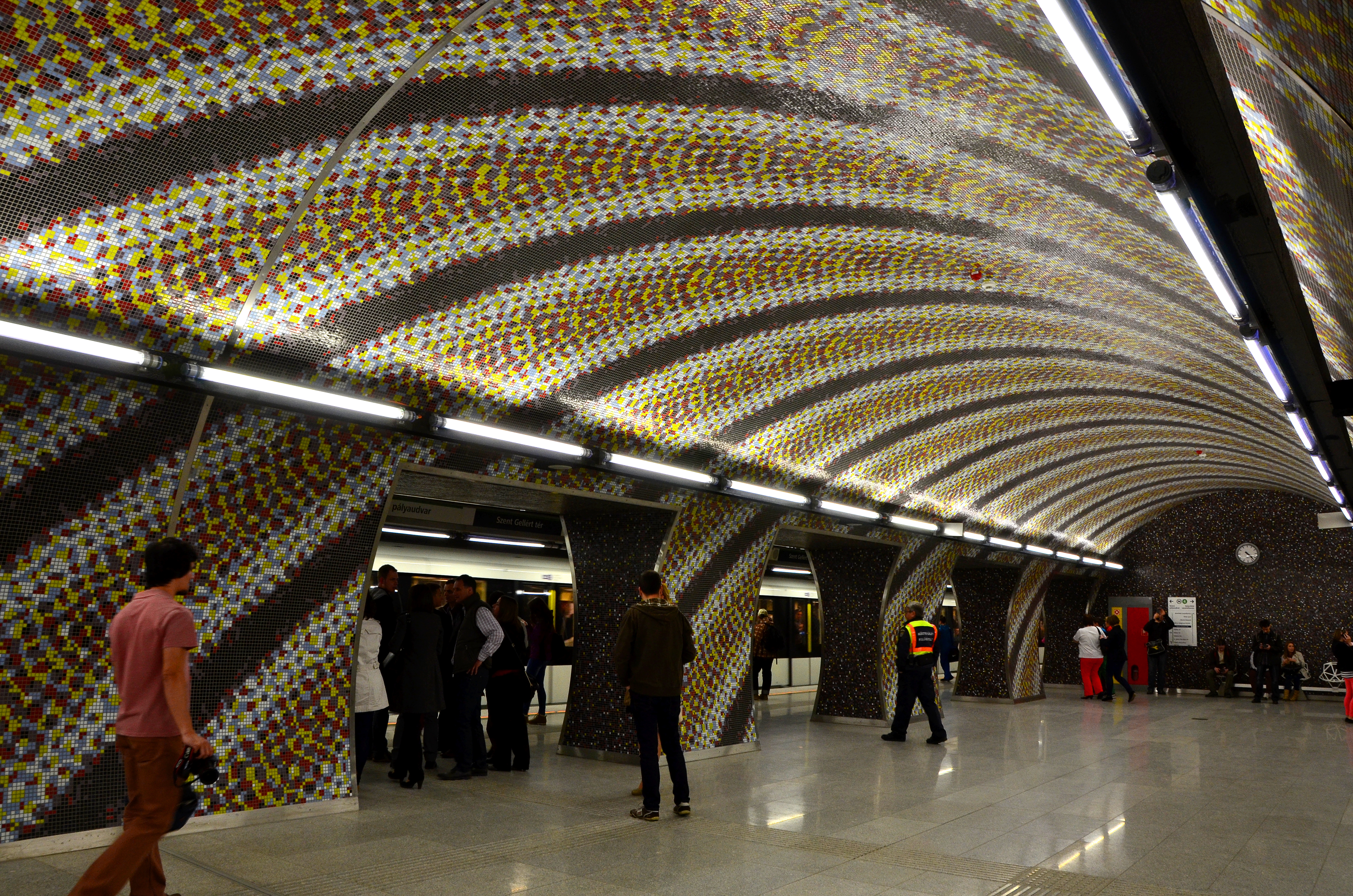

General information
- Location: Budapest; Hungary
- Coordinates: 47°28′59″N 19°03′17″E
- System: Budapest Metro station
- Platforms: 1 island platform

Construction
- Structure type: Mixed underground
- Depth: 31.0 metres (101.7 ft)

History
- Opened: 28 March 2014

Services
Preceding station	Budapest Metro	Following station
Móricz Zsigmond körtér towards Kelenföld vasútállomás	Line 4	Fővám tér towards Keleti pályaudvar
Location

Szent Gellért tér – Műegyetem (formerly Szent Gellért tér) is a station of Line 4 of the Budapest Metro. It is located beneath the eponymous square, named after St. Gerard (Szent Gellért), patron saint of Budapest. The station was opened on 28 March 2014 as part of the inaugural section of the line, from Keleti pályaudvar to Kelenföld vasútállomás. Artist Tamás Komoróczky was commissioned to design the mosaic interior decoration of the inner platform below the University of Technology and Economics. It is the deepest station on Line 4.

== Connections ==
- Bus: 7, 107, 133E
- Tram: 19, 41, 47, 48, 49, 56, 56A
