= Bikás park metro station =

Budapest metro station

Bikás park
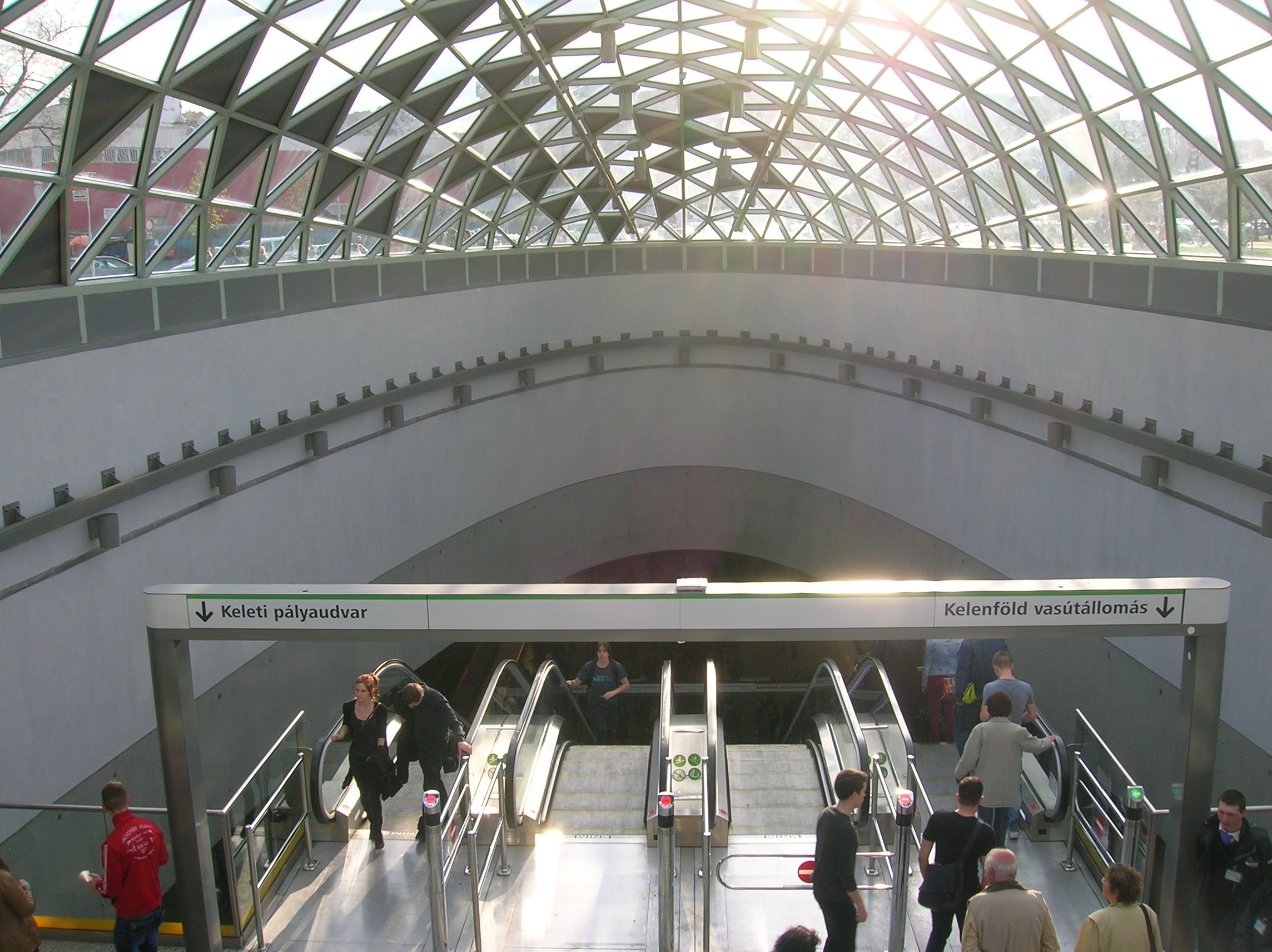

General information
- Location: Budapest; Hungary
- Coordinates: 47°27′54″N 19°01′59″E
- System: Budapest Metro station
- Platforms: 1 island platform

Construction
- Structure type: Cut-and-covered (by a glass dome)
- Depth: 14.5 metres (48 ft)

History
- Opened: 28 March 2014

Services
Preceding station	Budapest Metro	Following station
Kelenföld vasútállomás Terminus	Line 4	Újbuda-központ towards Keleti pályaudvar
Location

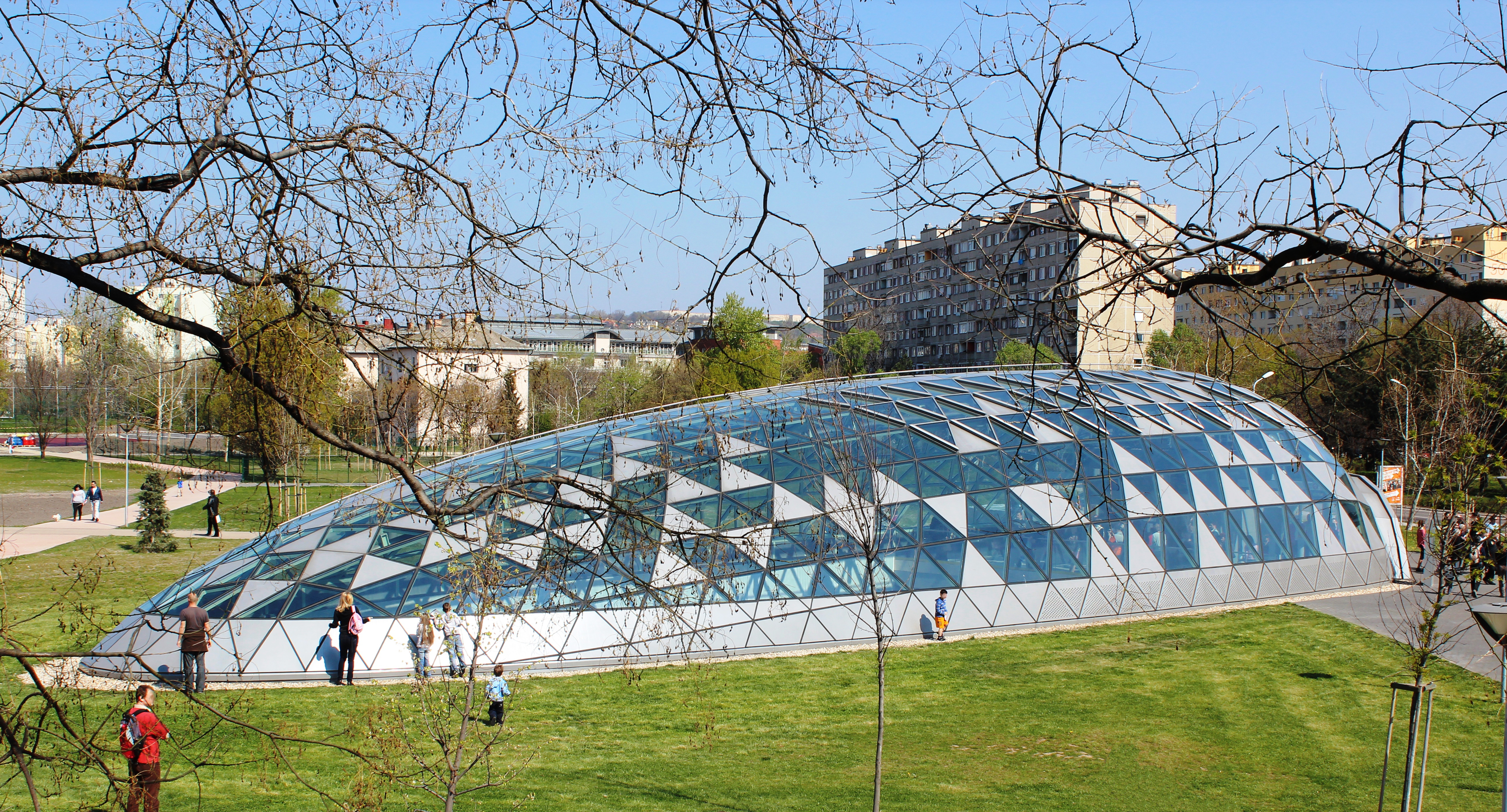
Surface entrance of the metro station

Bikás park is a station on Line 4 of the Budapest Metro. The station is located in the Kelenföld neighborhood in southern Buda. Its name is derived from the park (Bulls Park) in which the station entrance is located. The station was opened on 28 March 2014 as part of the inaugural section of the line, from Keleti pályaudvar to Kelenföld vasútállomás.

It is among the first in the system to feature skylights. Gábor Dénes College is only a short walk away.

== Connections ==
- Bus: 7, 58, 114, 153, 213, 214
- Tram: 1
