= Kálvin tér metro station =

Budapest metro station

Kálvin tér
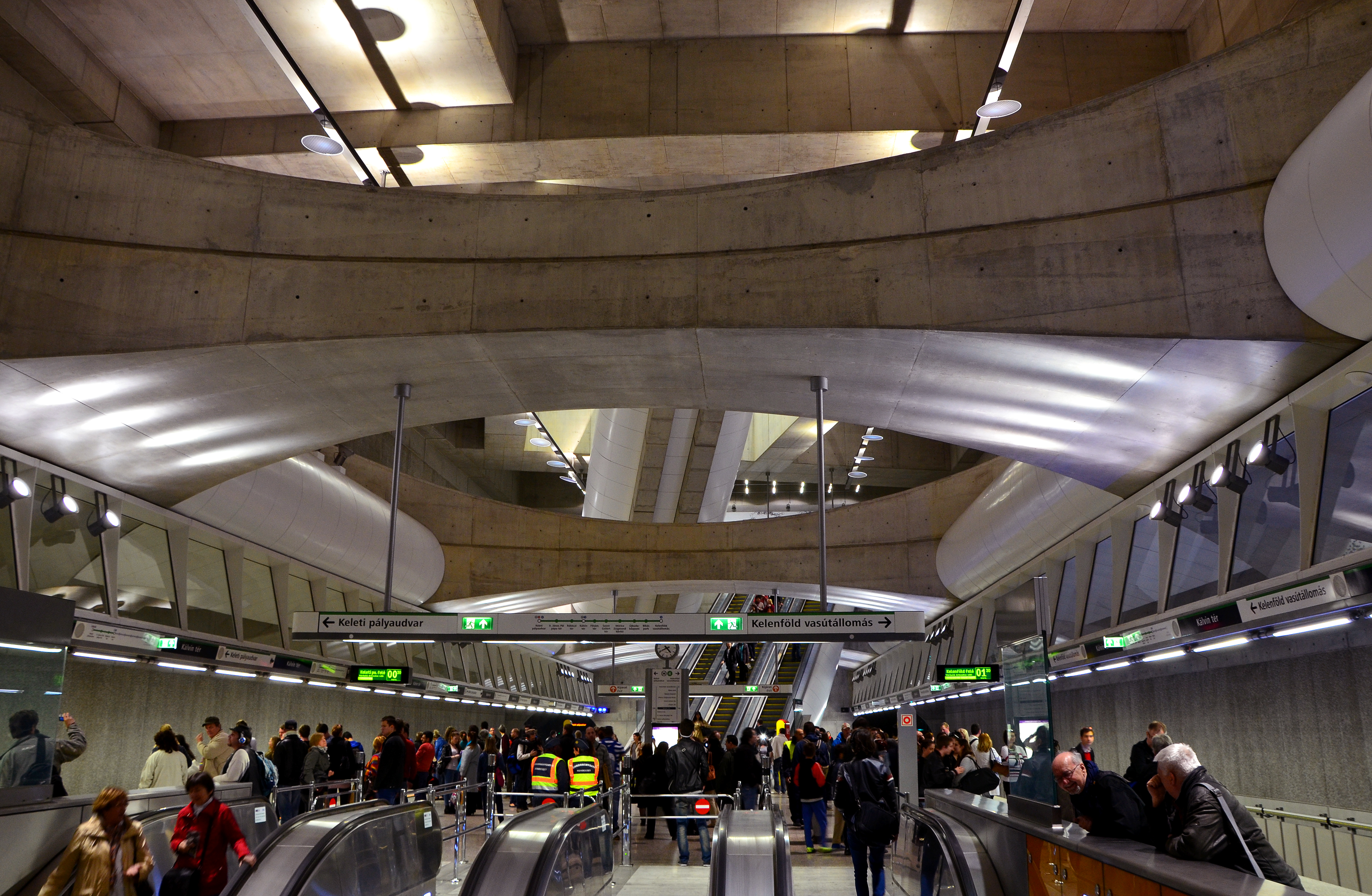

General information
- Location: Budapest; Hungary
- Coordinates: 47°29′23″N 19°03′42″E
- System: Budapest Metro station
- Platforms: 2 island platforms

Construction
- Structure type: Bored underground (Line 3); Mixed underground (Line 4)
- Depth: 28.4 metres (93 ft) (Line 3); 22.4 metres (73 ft) (Line 4)

History
- Opened: 31 December 1976 (Line 3); 28 March 2014 (Line 4)

Services
Preceding station	Budapest Metro	Following station
Corvin-negyed towards Kőbánya-Kispest	Line 3	Ferenciek tere towards Újpest-központ
Fővám tér towards Kelenföld vasútállomás	Line 4	Rákóczi tér towards Keleti pályaudvar
Location

Kálvin tér is a transfer station on the M3 and the M4 lines of the Budapest Metro. It is located beneath the eponymous square, named after John Calvin. The Line 3 station was opened on 31 December 1976 as part of the inaugural section of Line M3 between Deák Ferenc tér and Nagyvárad tér. The Line M4 station was opened on 28 March 2014 as part of the inaugural section of the line, from Keleti pályaudvar to Kelenföld vasútállomás.

== Connections ==
- Bus: 9, 15, 100E, 223E
- Trolleybus: 72, 83
- Tram: 47, 48, 49
