= II. János Pál pápa tér metro station =

Budapest metro station

II. János Pál pápa tér
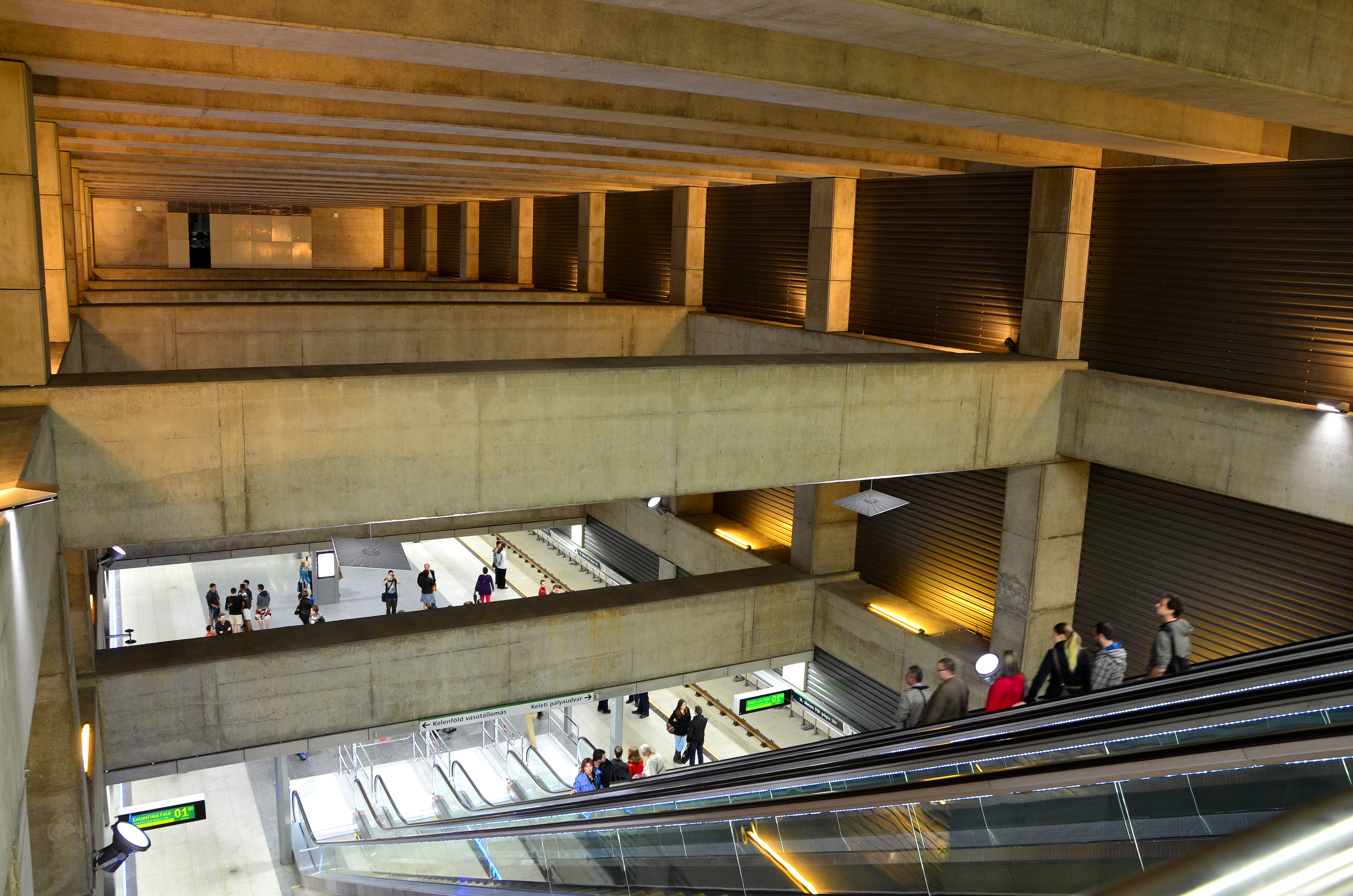

General information
- Location: Budapest; Hungary
- Coordinates: 47°29′45″N 19°04′39″E
- System: Budapest Metro station
- Platforms: 1 island platform

Construction
- Structure type: Mixed underground
- Depth: 16.7 metres (55 ft)

History
- Opened: 28 March 2014

Services
Preceding station	Budapest Metro	Following station
Rákóczi tér towards Kelenföld vasútállomás	Line 4	Keleti pályaudvar Terminus
Location

II. János Pál pápa tér is a station on Line 4 of the Budapest Metro. It is located beneath the eponymous square, named after John Paul II. The station was opened on 28 March 2014 as part of the inaugural section of the line, from Keleti pályaudvar to Kelenföld vasútállomás.

== Connections ==
- Bus: 99, 217E
- Tram: 28, 28A, 37, 37A, 62
