= Újbuda-központ metro station =

Budapest metro station

Újbuda-központ
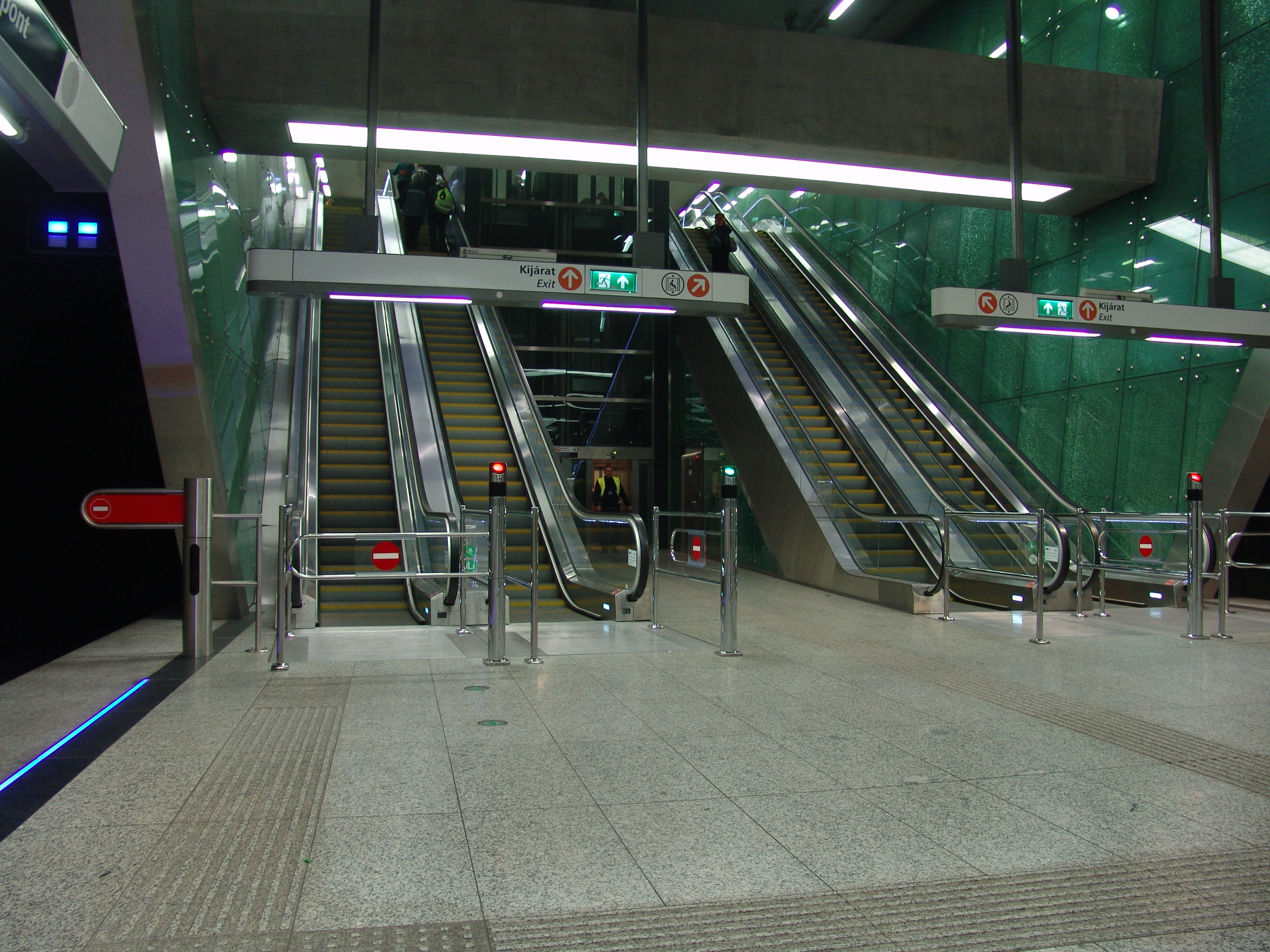

General information
- Location: Budapest; Hungary
- Coordinates: 47°28′27″N 19°02′45″E
- System: Budapest Metro station
- Platforms: 1 island platform

Construction
- Structure type: Cut-and-covered underground
- Depth: 15.6 metres (51 ft)

History
- Opened: 28 March 2014

Services
Preceding station	Budapest Metro	Following station
Bikás park towards Kelenföld vasútállomás	Line 4	Móricz Zsigmond körtér towards Keleti pályaudvar
Location

Újbuda-központ (lit. "Újbuda-Centrum") is a station on Line 4 of the Budapest Metro. The station is an important traffic junction. Tramways leading to southern Buda cross road traffic from Petőfi Bridge here. It is also the southern terminus of Tramline 4. The station was opened on 28 March 2014 as part of the inaugural section of the line, from Keleti pályaudvar to Kelenföld vasútállomás.

== Connections ==
- Bus: 33, 53, 58, 150, 150B, 153, 154, 212, 212A, 212B
- Tram: 4, 17, 41, 47, 48, 56
