= Ferenciek tere metro station =

Budapest metro station

Ferenciek tere
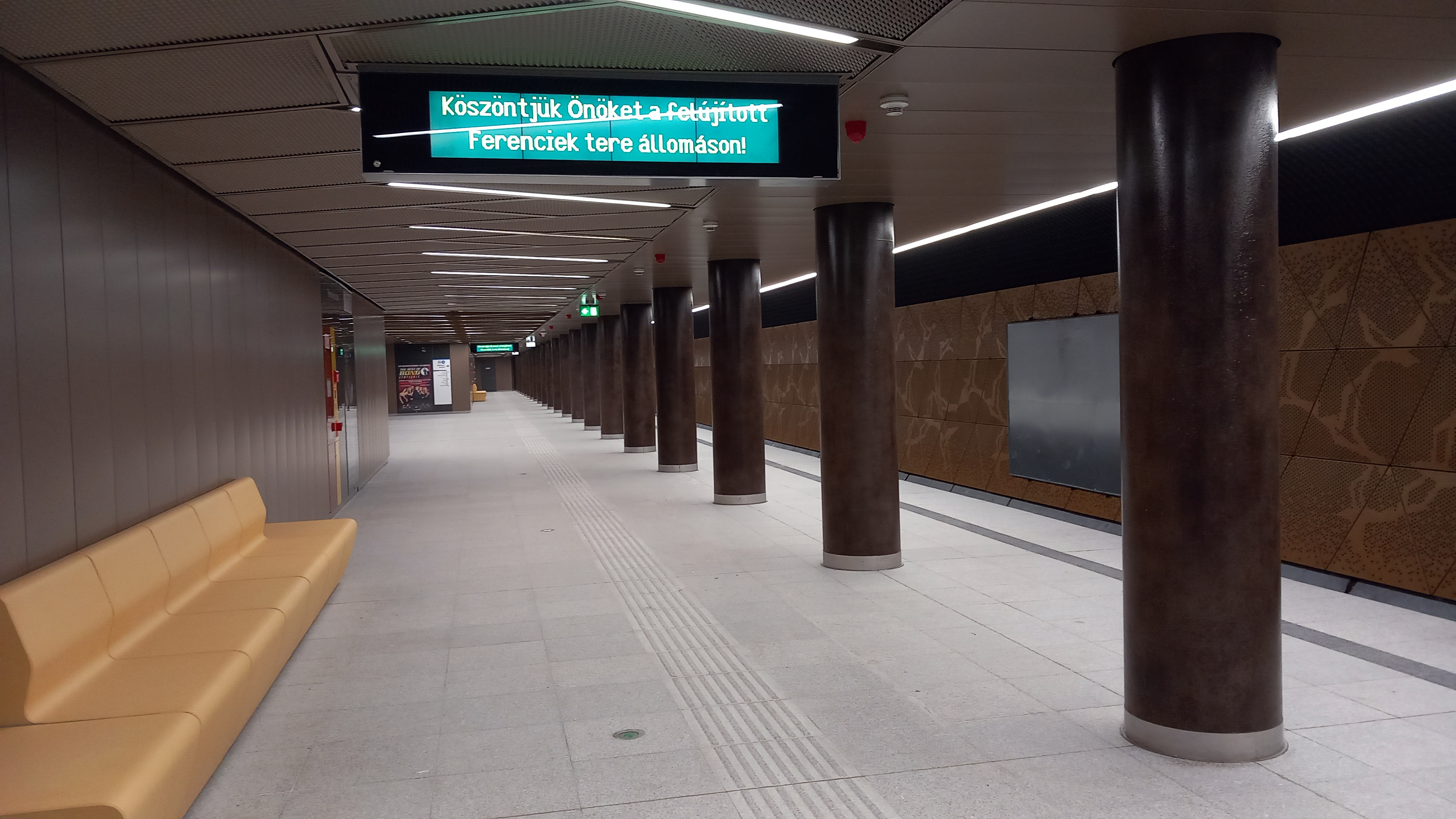

General information
- Location: Budapest; Hungary
- Coordinates: 47°29′35″N 19°03′22″E
- System: Budapest Metro station
- Platforms: 1 island platform

Construction
- Structure type: bored underground
- Depth: 27.7 metres (91 ft)

History
- Opened: 31 December 1976
- Closed: 7 March 2020 temporarily
- Rebuilt: 2022

Services
Preceding station	Budapest Metro	Following station
Kálvin tér towards Kőbánya-Kispest	Line 3	Deák Ferenc tér towards Újpest-központ
Location

Ferenciek tere is a station on the M3 (North-South) line of the Budapest Metro located under the eponymous square in the Downtown. It is an important junction, as several bus lines from Buda pass through or terminate here. It is also the station closest to the geographical city centre of Budapest. The station's name was Felszabadulás tér ("Liberation" Square) before 1990.

The station was opened on 31 December 1976 as part of the inaugural section of Line M3 between Deák Ferenc tér and Nagyvárad tér.

== Connections ==
- Bus: 5, 7, 8E, 15, 107, 108E, 110, 112, 133E
- Tram: 2, 2B, 23
