= Metro Line M5 (Budapest Metro) =

Budapest Metro Line 5

Overview
- Line number: Line 5 (Budapest Metro)

Technical
- Track gauge: 1,435 mm (4 ft 8 1/2 in)
- Electrification: 825 or 1000 V DC
- Operating speed: at least 70 km/h max.

The North-south regional rapid railway is a railway construction plan in Budapest, modelled on the Paris RER or German S-Bahn systems. Its aim is to connect three of the Budapest Helyiérdekű Vasút (BHÉV) suburban train lines, from Szentendre, Ráckeve and Csepel. The plan is also called Metro 5.

== History ==
In the '90s, the growth of the suburbs was not accompanied by public transportation. Population growth was especially strong in Buda and in Csepel island region, but the HÉV lines end at the boundaries of the downtown area, where passengers have to change to go into the city. Hence the idea was born to connect the HÉV lines underground. Lord Mayor Gábor Demszky first spoke of plans in 2002.

In 2005 the city council set aside a first 100 million forint for the project. The council proposed to implement the investment between 2007 and 2010 with European Union funding, but this was rejected. In 2007 deputy mayor Miklós Hagyó stated the council wanted to begin construction of the railway, and in February 2008, the Urban and Suburban Transport Association (VEKE) designed a four-track version of the metro line, now proposing to build the railway line from European Union sources between 2014 and 2020.

The H5 suburban railway line was initially planned to be renamed line M5 in September 2019, however, the line still uses the name H5 as of 2026, and will continue to do so until the project actually begins.

On 14 April 2021 test excavations began as part of preparations for the first section between Közvágóhíd and Kálvin tér.

== Planning ==
The proposal is for a rapid rail system which will include the Budapest-Esztergom heavy railway line northward, and the Budapest-Kunszentmiklós line southward.

The Csepel and Ráckeve HÉV lines will be connected on the surface, near the National Theatre. In Boráros Square, the metro goes underground, and at Kálvin Square it crosses Metro line 3 and line 4. At Astoria the line crosses line 2. The rail heads to Oktogon, and crosses line 1. Finally, at Lehel tér, the line again crosses Metro line 3 before heading to Margaret Island and Buda side.

=== Proposed stations ===
Metro line 5, Észak-déli Regionális Gyorsvasút (North-South Regional Rapid Railway; provisional name), is planned to be a suburban railways' connector line, meant to replace and connect the lines of the existing suburban railways between Szentendre (currently served by HÉV Line 5), Ráckeve (currently served by HÉV Line 6) and Csepel (currently served by HÉV Line 7). It will cross Budapest downtown, and provide connection for the railway stations in the city. It will probably have the following stations (except for the termini, only those within Budapest are included):

- Szentendre
- ...
- Békásmegyer
- Petőfi tér
- Csillaghegy
- Rómaifürdő
- Aquincum
- Záhony u.
- Kaszásdűlő
- Bogdáni út
- Flórián tér
- Amfiteátrum
- Szépvölgyi út
- Margitsziget
- Szent István park
- Lehel tér
- Oktogon
- Klauzál tér
- Astoria
- Kálvin tér
- Boráros tér
- Könyves Kálmán körút
- Beöthy u.
- Kén u.
- Timót u.
- Határ út
- Pesterzsébet – városközpont
- Nagysándor József u.
- Klapka Gy. u.
- Wesselényi u. (or Akácfa u. instead of the latter two)
- Vörösmarty tér
- Könyves u.
- Tárcsás u.
- Soroksári vasútállomás
- BILK (logisztikai központ)
- ...
- Csepel, Ráckeve

Branching at Könyves u.:

- Soroksár felső
- Soroksár – Hősök tere
- Szent István u.
- Millennium-telep
- ...

See the map.
