= Metro Line M4 (Budapest Metro) =

Rapid transit line in Budapest, Hungary

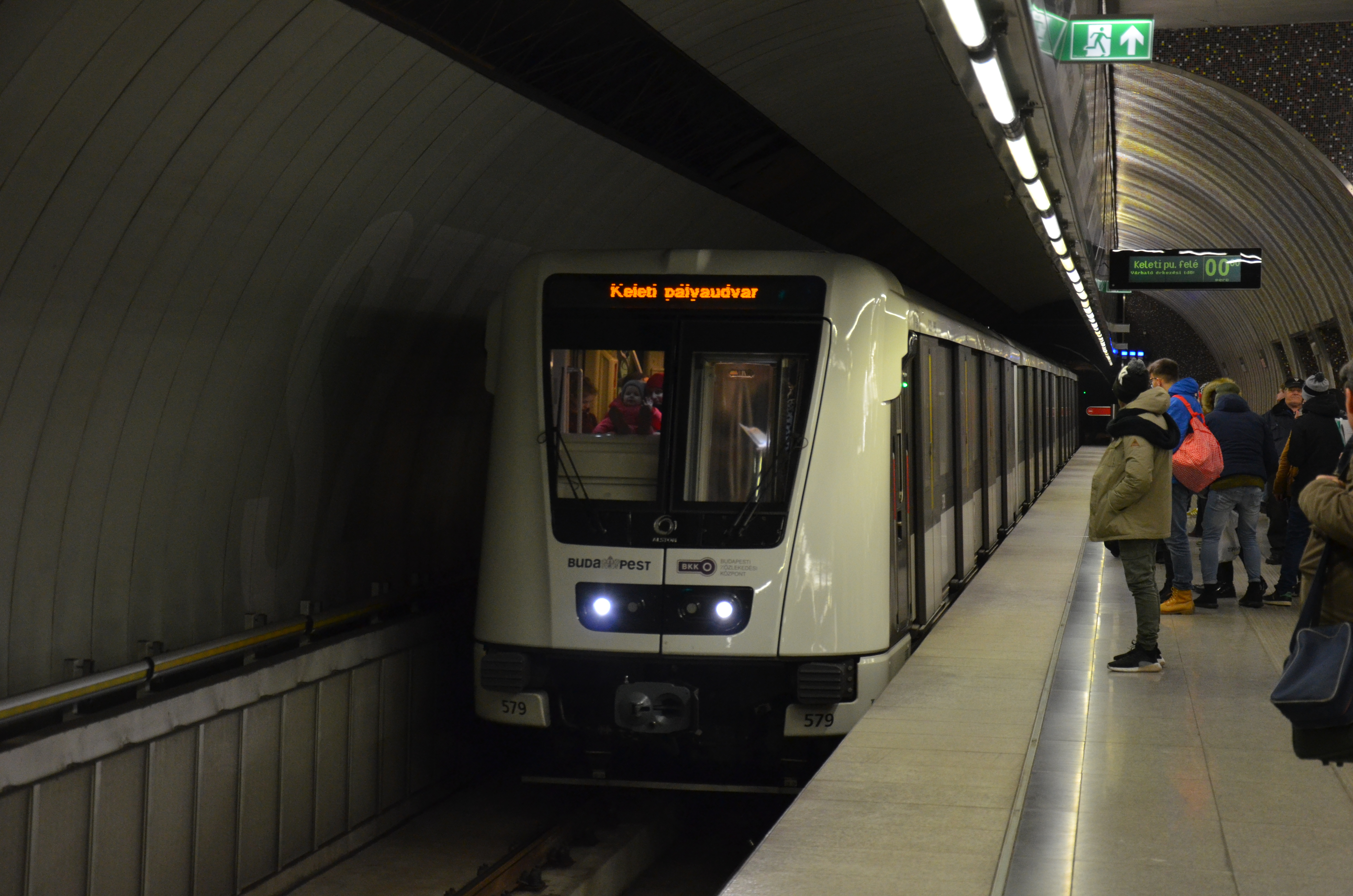
- A train arrives at Szent Gellért tér.

Overview
- Status: Operational
- Line number: Line 4 ("Green metro")
- Termini: Kelenföld vasútállomás; Keleti pályaudvar
- Stations: 10
- Website: www.metro4.hu

Service
- Type: Rapid transit
- System: Budapest Metro
- Operator(s): BKK
- Rolling stock: AM4-M4

History
- Opened: 28 March 2014; 12 years ago

Technical
- Line length: 7.4 km (4.6 mi) Phase II (planned): 3.2 km (2.0 mi) Phase III (planned):2.1 km (1.3 mi)
- Track gauge: 1,435 mm (4 ft 8 1/2 in)
- Electrification: 750 V DC
- Operating speed: 80 km/h (50 mph)
Route map
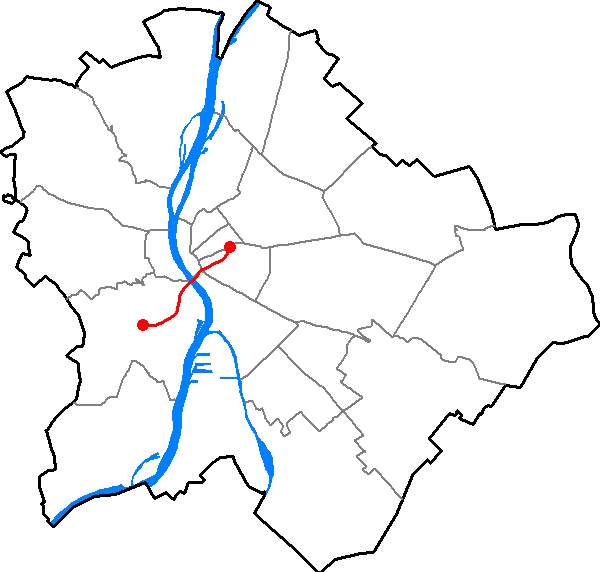

Line 4 (officially: South Buda–Rákospalota (DBR) Line, Metro 4 or M4, and unofficially: Green Line) is the fourth line of the Budapest Metro. It opened on 28 March 2014.

The first section, 7.4 km (4.6 mi) in length and consisting of ten stations, connects the southwestern Kelenföld vasútállomás located in Buda, and the eastern Keleti pályaudvar in Pest, under the River Danube. While three additional sections — the first, an eastern extension to Bosnyák tér, the second west to Virágpiac, and a third further east to Újpalota — have been planned, these remain unfunded by the Budapest city government and the European Union.

Before Line 4 was built, only Line 2 served the Buda side of the river. Daily ridership has been estimated at 185,000-195,000 The line operates using fully automated Alstom Metropolis train sets, which are also used on Line 2, although on line 2 the trains are 5 cars in length and have a cab, while on line 4 the trains are 4 cars in length and do not have a cab.

In Hungary, the construction of the line has been widely criticised because its route was perceived as outdated, although the general city-structure and population density remained unchanged. The line has been noted for its high costs and inordinate delays — 17 in total — during construction.

== History ==
The first plans for a fourth metro line were developed in 1972; the line was planned to run between South Buda and Rákospalota/Újpalota, later to Zugló. The first decree was made in 1976 and the government intended to start construction in 1978, however the project was suspended in 1978, in favour of extending Line 3.

Construction eventually started in 2004, and the first section with 10 stations opened in 2014.

M4 has a transfer station for Line 2 at Keleti pályaudvar and for Line 3 at Kálvin tér station.

Sections	Opened	Length	Stations
Kelenföld vasútállomás - Keleti pályaudvar	28 March 2014	7.4 km (4.6 mi)	10
Keleti pályaudvar - Bosnyák tér	planned	3.2 km (2.0 mi)	4
Kelenföld vasútállomás - Madárhegy	planned	2.1 km (1.3 mi)	2
Total	planned	12.7 km (7.9 mi)	16

== Controversies ==
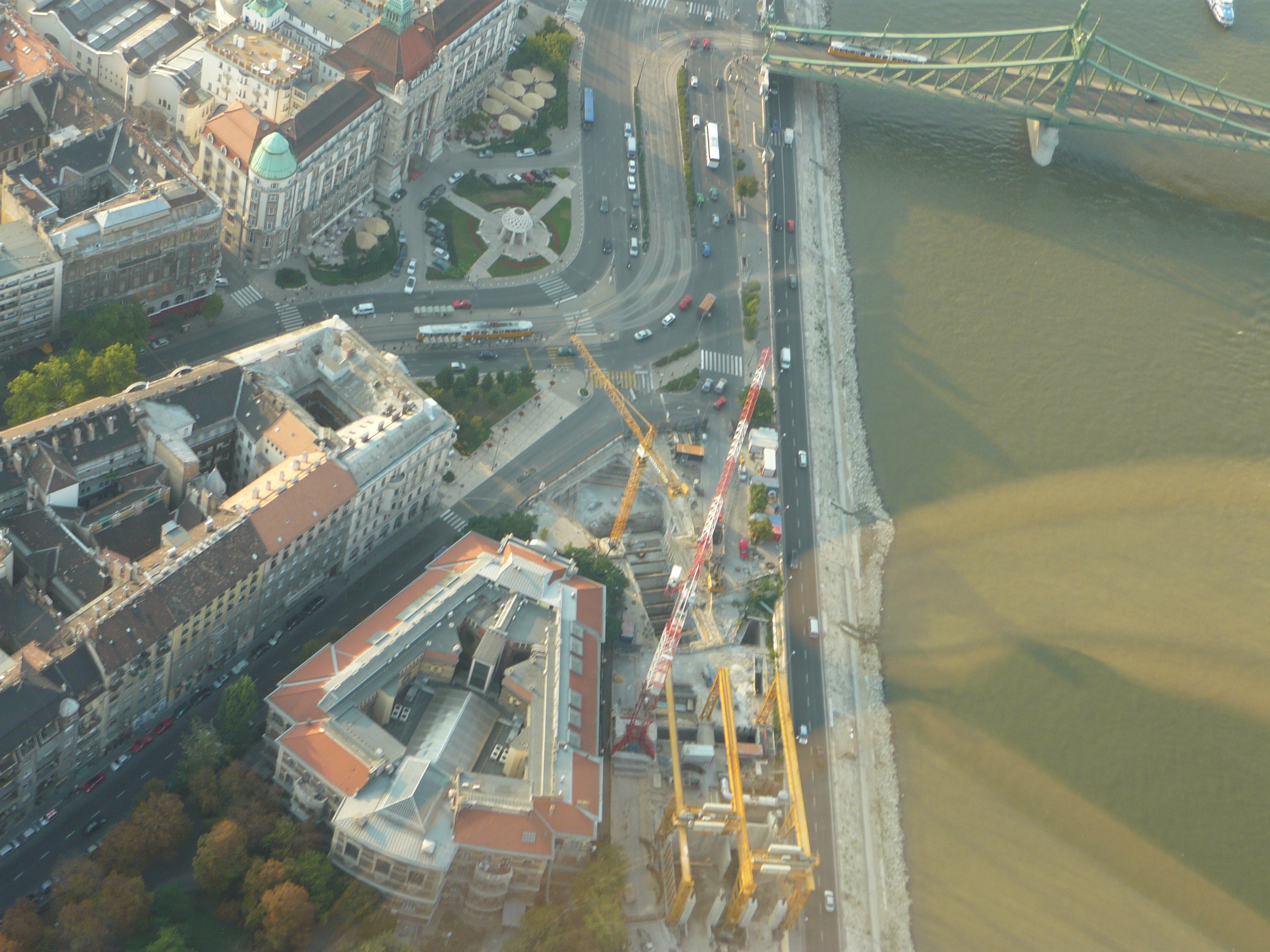
Construction works taking place at Szent Gellért Tér close to the Danube River, 2009

The construction of the line has been widely criticized as slow and incompetent. Critics have panned the constant delays as evidence of widespread government corruption.

=== Delays ===
The Budapest city government delayed the opening of the line 17 times. Gábor Demszky, the liberal mayor of Budapest from 1990 to 2010, originally promised in 1998 that the first section of the line would be open by 2003. However, Viktor Orbán's first government (1998-2002) withheld funds necessary for starting the construction. The project restarted in 2003 under the socialist-liberal national government. In 2004, as construction still hadn't begun, Demszky amended the opening date to 2008. The construction works finally started in 2006; in that year the scheduled opening was changed to 2009. It was again changed - in April 2007 - to 2010; and in October 2007 to 2011.

In 2008, Gusztáv Klados, the line's project manager, announced that the opening would be further delayed until the end of 2011. In 2009, he stated the opening would be delayed until 2012. Later that year, Klados further delayed the opening until 2012, and one year later, in 2010, István Tarlós, Demszky's Fidesz successor as mayor, pushed the likely opening back to as late as 2015.

In 2011, deputy mayor Gyula Hutiray reaffirmed the 2015 completion date. Tarlós later clarified that a 2013 or 2014 opening were not outside the realm of possibility.

The line was opened by Prime Minister Viktor Orbán on 28 March 2014, one week before the parliamentary elections that saw his party, Fidesz, reelected to a second supermajority. Orbán made several references to his government's extensive infrastructure projects during the ceremony. Unlike the transport facilities that were the infrastructure projects of the socialists, the projects started by Orbán's government were mainly cultural facilities.

=== Costs ===
Construction of the line cost 1.5 billion Euros, or 1.5% of Hungary's annual GDP, of which 600 million came from European Union funds. According to estimates the first section of the M4 will have cost approximately 452 billion HUF to build alongside an annual operating cost of 6 billion HUF, which is fourfold the operating costs of the M2 and M3 combined. These funds, critics claim, would have been better invested in other large-scale transportation projects such as the connection of M2 to the Gödöllő HÉV or the construction of new tram lines. Rumors that the M4 would be the most expensive metro line ever built, however, have been rebuffed by contractors.

=== Route ===
Critics have noted that the route served by Line 4 was already extensively served by a variety of tram (19, 47, 49) and bus (7, 7A, 7E, 173E) lines. The line has also been criticized for densely placed stations, some, such as Móricz Zsigmond körtér and Újbuda-központ, within a few hundred meters of one another. On the other hand, the city government has conducted research showing that the new line will reduce travel times on a heavily used transit corridor, because travel in the subway is not slowed by the traffic jams on the surface.

=== Unfunded extensions ===
Despite long-term plans, which included the eventual extension to Rákospalota, future extensions to the M4 are uncertain. Tarlós's Fidesz city government eliminated funding for the second phase of the line after taking over from Demszky's government, and the European Union has refused to provide additional funds. Some critics claim that without the extensions the current state of the line amounts to "several hundred-million forints thrown out the window."

=== Operation ===
Driverless trains have been in operation since the opening, but until January 2016 all trains ran with on-board driver supervision. Since January 2016 the driver cabs have been removed and there is no on-board supervision.

== Stations and connections ==
Kelenföld vasútállomás – Keleti pályaudvar
Travel Time min:sec	Station	Travel Time min:sec	Connection	Buildings / Monuments
0:00	Kelenföld vasútállomás ♿	13:45	1, 19, 49; 8E, 40, 40B, 40E, 53, 58, 87, 87A, 88, 88A, 101B, 101E, 108E, 141, 150, 150B, 153, 154, 172, 173, 187, 188, 188E, 250, 250B, 251, 251A, 251E, 272; Regional buses Hungarian State Railways (MÁV)	Budapest-Kelenföld railway station, Intermodal junction
1:42	Bikás park ♿	12:15	1; 7, 58, 114, 153, 213, 214; Regional buses	Market
3:52	Újbuda-központ ♿	10:07	4, 17, 41, 47, 48, 56; 33, 53, 58, 150, 150B, 153, 154, 212, 212A, 212B; Long-distance buses	Allee, Market Hall
5:10	Móricz Zsigmond körtér ♿	8:45	6, 17, 19, 41, 47, 48, 49, 56, 56A, 61; 7, 27, 33, 33A, 58, 114, 213, 214, 240	Major public transport hub, Lake Feneketlen
6:52	Szent Gellért tér – Műegyetem ♿	7:05	19, 41, 47, 48, 49, 56, 56A; 7, 107, 133E	Budapest University of Technology and Economics, Gellért Thermal Baths and Swimming Pool
8:07	Fővám tér ♿	5:55	2, 2B, 23, 47, 48, 49; 83; 15, 223E	Corvinus University of Budapest, Great Market Hall
9:30	Kálvin tér ♿	4:35	47, 48, 49; 72, 83; 9, 15, 100E, 223E	Hungarian National Museum, Fővárosi Szabó Ervin Könyvtár
11:12	Rákóczi tér ♿	2:47	4, 6	Market Hall
12:35	II. János Pál pápa tér ♿	1:22	28, 28A, 37, 37A, 62; 99, 217E	Erkel Theatre
13:45	Keleti pályaudvar ♿	0:00	23, 24; 73, 76, 78, 79, 80; 5, 7, 7E, 8E, 20E, 30, 30A, 107, 108E, 110, 112, 133E, 230; Hungarian State Railways (MÁV)	Budapest Keleti railway station, Aréna Mall
