= Lake Feneketlen =

Pond in Budapest, Hungary

Lake Feneketlen Feneketlen-tó
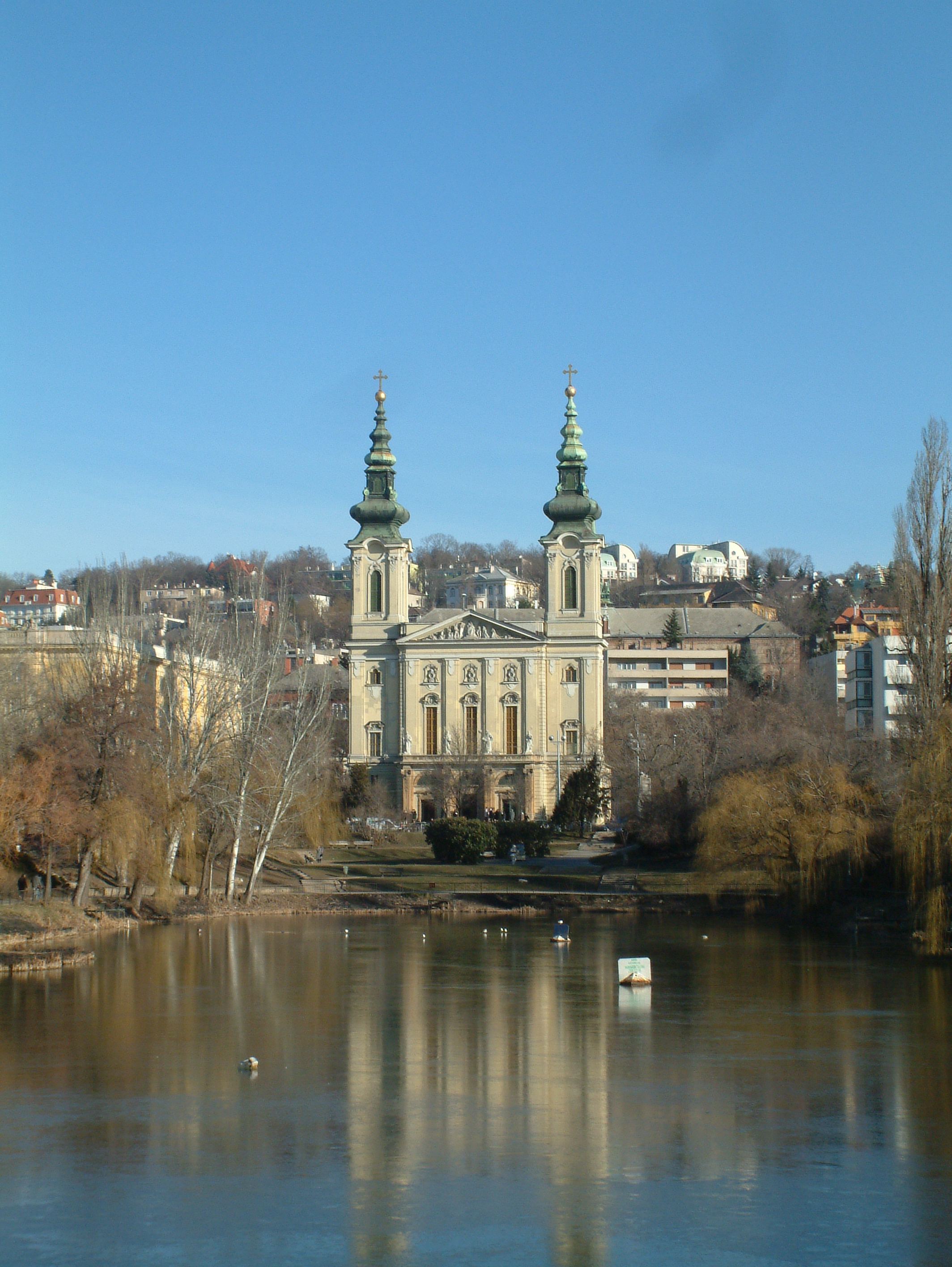

- Location within Hungary
- Location: Budapest
- Coordinates: 47°28′36″N 19°2′29″E
- Basin countries: Hungary
- Max. length: approx. 200 m (660 ft)
- Max. width: approx. 40 m (130 ft)
- Surface area: approx. 10,000 m^{2} (110,000 sq ft)
- Max. depth: 4–5 m (13–16 ft)
- Settlements: Budapest

Lake Feneketlen (Feneketlen-tó, "Bottomless Lake") is a pond in the 11th district of Budapest, Hungary.

The lake was formed in 1877, when clay was removed from the site to supply a brick factory that was situated at nearby Kosztolányi Dezső tér. The lake's water quality in the 1980s began to deteriorate, until a water circulation device was built. The fishing is forbidden on this lake.
