= Keleti pályaudvar metro station =

Budapest metro station

Keleti pályaudvar
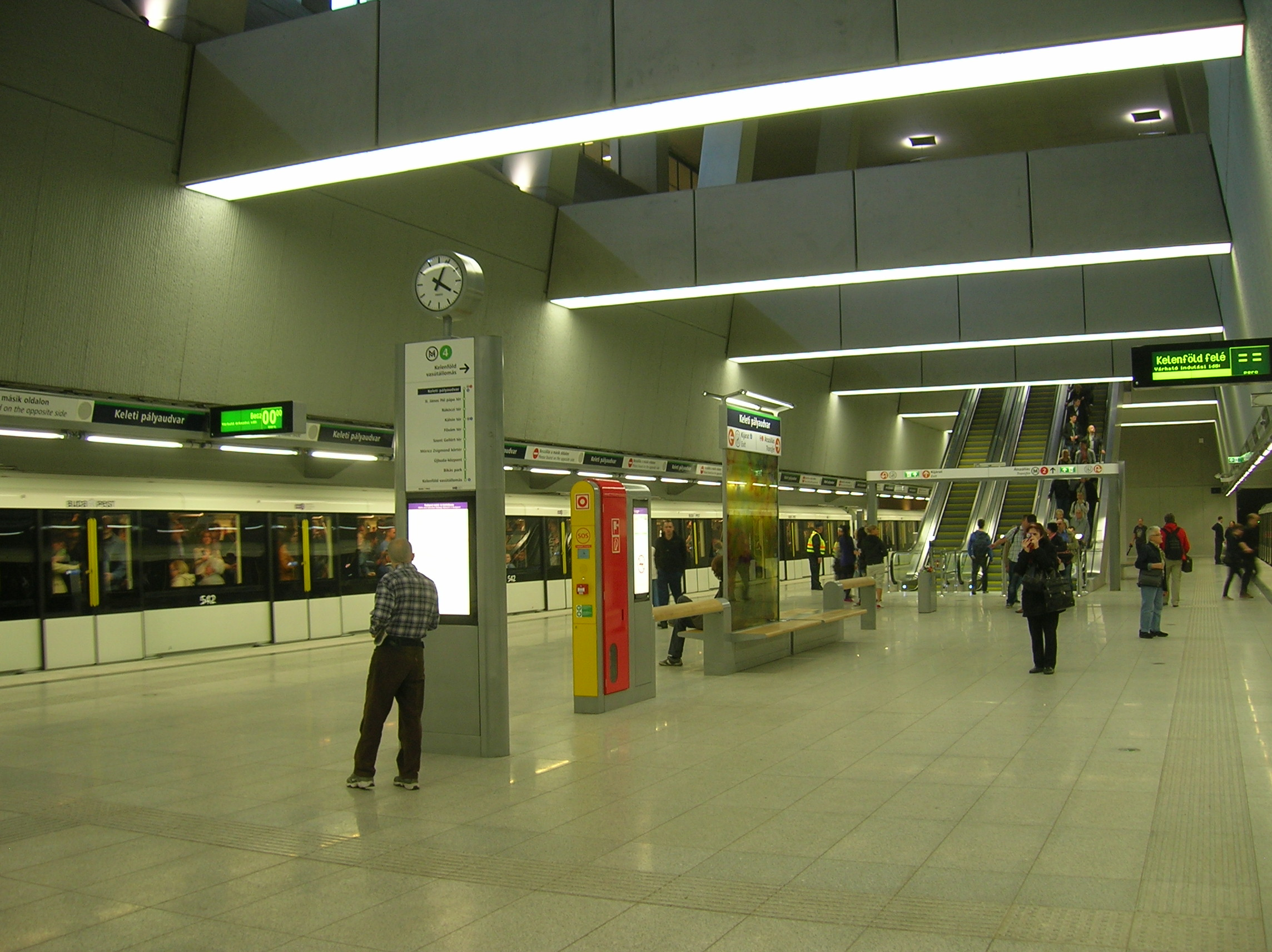
- Metro line M4 - Keleti pályaudvar station

General information
- Coordinates: 47°30′01″N 19°04′54″E
- System: Budapest Metro station
- Platforms: 2 island platforms

Construction
- Structure type: Bored underground (Line 2); Mixed underground (Line 4)
- Depth: 28.3 metres (93 ft) (Line 2); 14.0 metres (45.9 ft) (Line 4)

History
- Opened: 2 April 1970 (Line 2); 28 March 2014 (Line 4)
- Rebuilt: 2005 (Line 2)

Services
Preceding station	Budapest Metro	Following station
Blaha Lujza tér towards Déli pályaudvar	Line 2	Puskás Ferenc Stadion towards Örs vezér tere
II. János Pál pápa tér towards Kelenföld vasútállomás	Line 4	Terminus
Location

Keleti pályaudvar (Keleti Railway Station) is a transfer station on M2 and M4 lines of the Budapest Metro. The Line M2 station was opened on 2 April 1970 as part of the inaugural section of Line M2, between Deák Ferenc tér and Örs vezér tere. The Line M4 station was opened on 28 March 2014 as the eastern terminus of the inaugural section of the line, from Keleti pályaudvar to Kelenföld vasútállomás.

== Connections ==
- Bus: 5, 7, 7E, 8E, 20E, 30, 30A, 107, 108E, 110, 112, 133E, 230
- Trolleybus: 73, 76, 78, 79, 80
- Tram: 23, 24
