= Kelenföld vasútállomás metro station =

Budapest metro station

Kelenföld vasútállomás
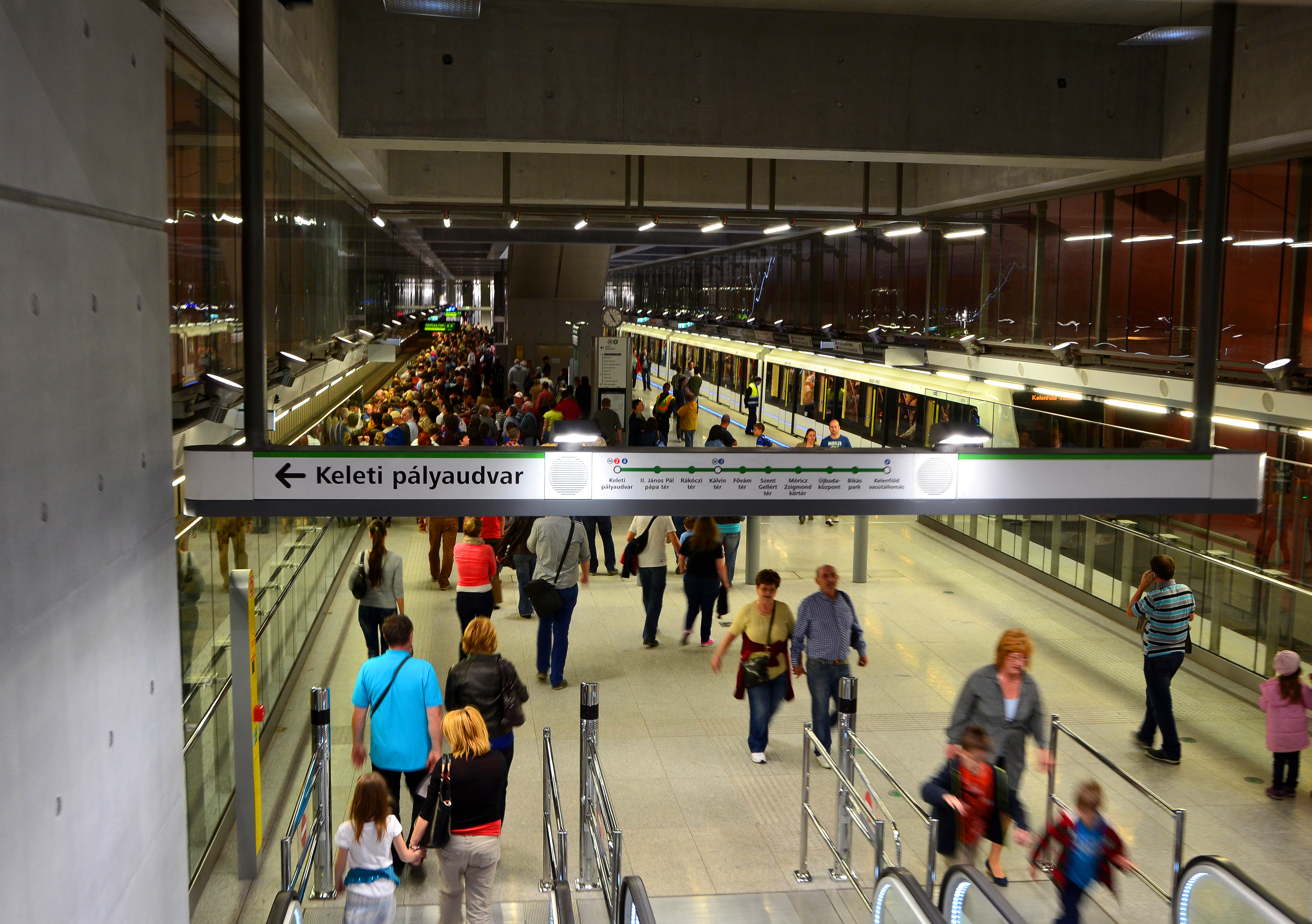

General information
- Location: Budapest; Hungary
- Coordinates: 47°27′52″N 19°01′07″E
- System: Budapest Metro station
- Platforms: 1 island platform

Construction
- Structure type: Mixed underground
- Depth: 16.4 metres (54 ft)

History
- Opened: 28 March 2014

Services
Preceding station	Budapest Metro	Following station
Terminus	Line 4	Bikás park towards Keleti pályaudvar
Location

Kelenföld vasútállomás (Kelenföld railway station) is the western terminus of Line 4 of the Budapest Metro. The station was opened on 28 March 2014 as part of the inaugural section of the line, from Keleti pályaudvar to Kelenföld vasútállomás.

The station, located under Kelenföld railway station and across some of the busiest railroad tracks in Budapest, can be reached through an underpass. This was the former terminus of express bus lines 7E and 107E, which allowed passengers arriving by train to continue traveling to Pest or southern Buda. Since Metro service started on 28 March 2014, passengers traveling by train are able to transfer to Budapest Keleti railway station by Metro without having to take Line 2 from Budapest Déli railway station.

== Connections ==
- Bus: 8E, 40, 40B, 40E, 53, 58, 87, 87A, 88, 88A, 101B, 101E, 108E, 141, 150, 150B, 153, 154, 172, 173, 187, 188, 188E, 250, 250B, 251, 251A, 251E, 272
- Tram: 1, 19, 49
