= Budapest Metro =

Rapid transit system of Budapest, Hungary

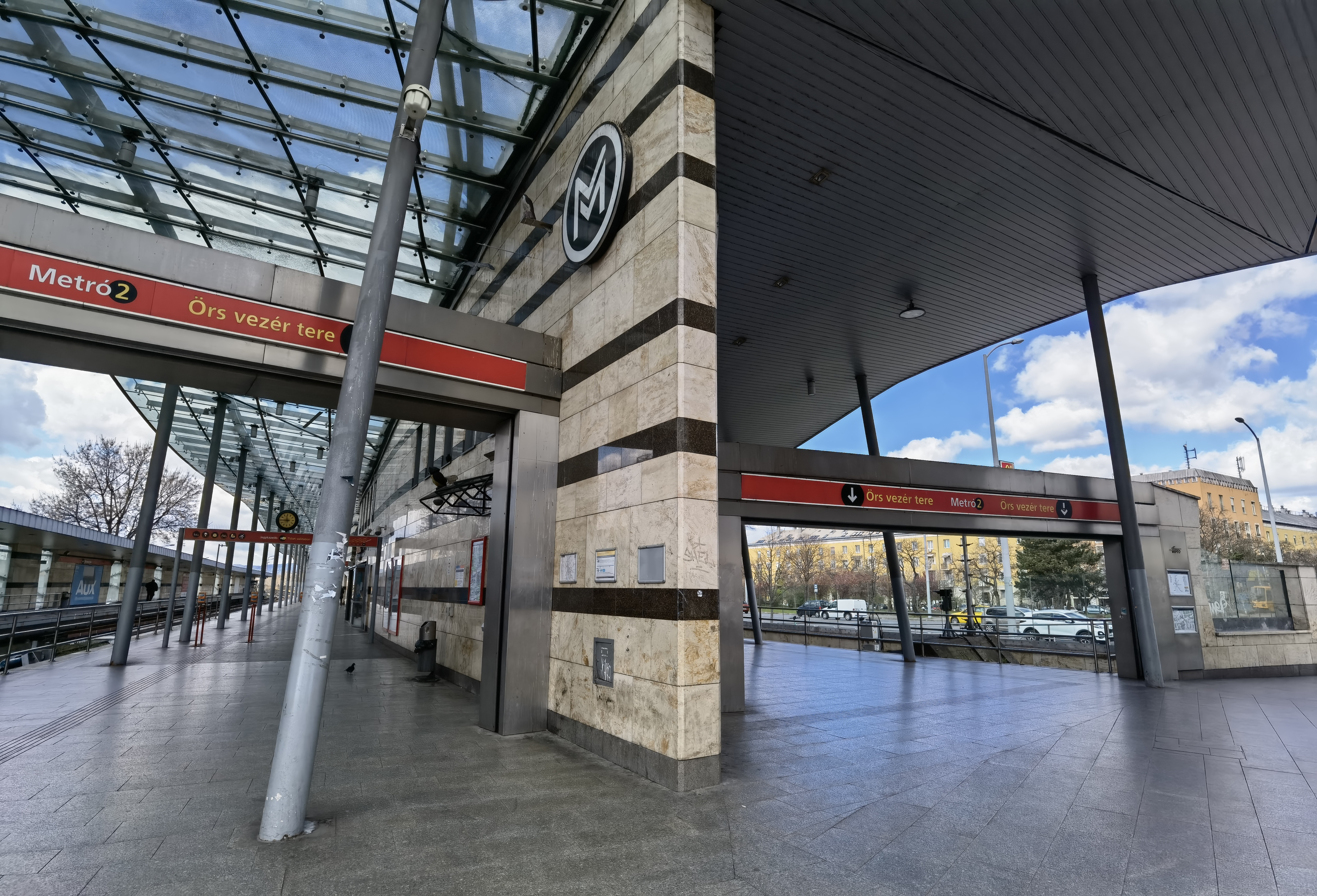

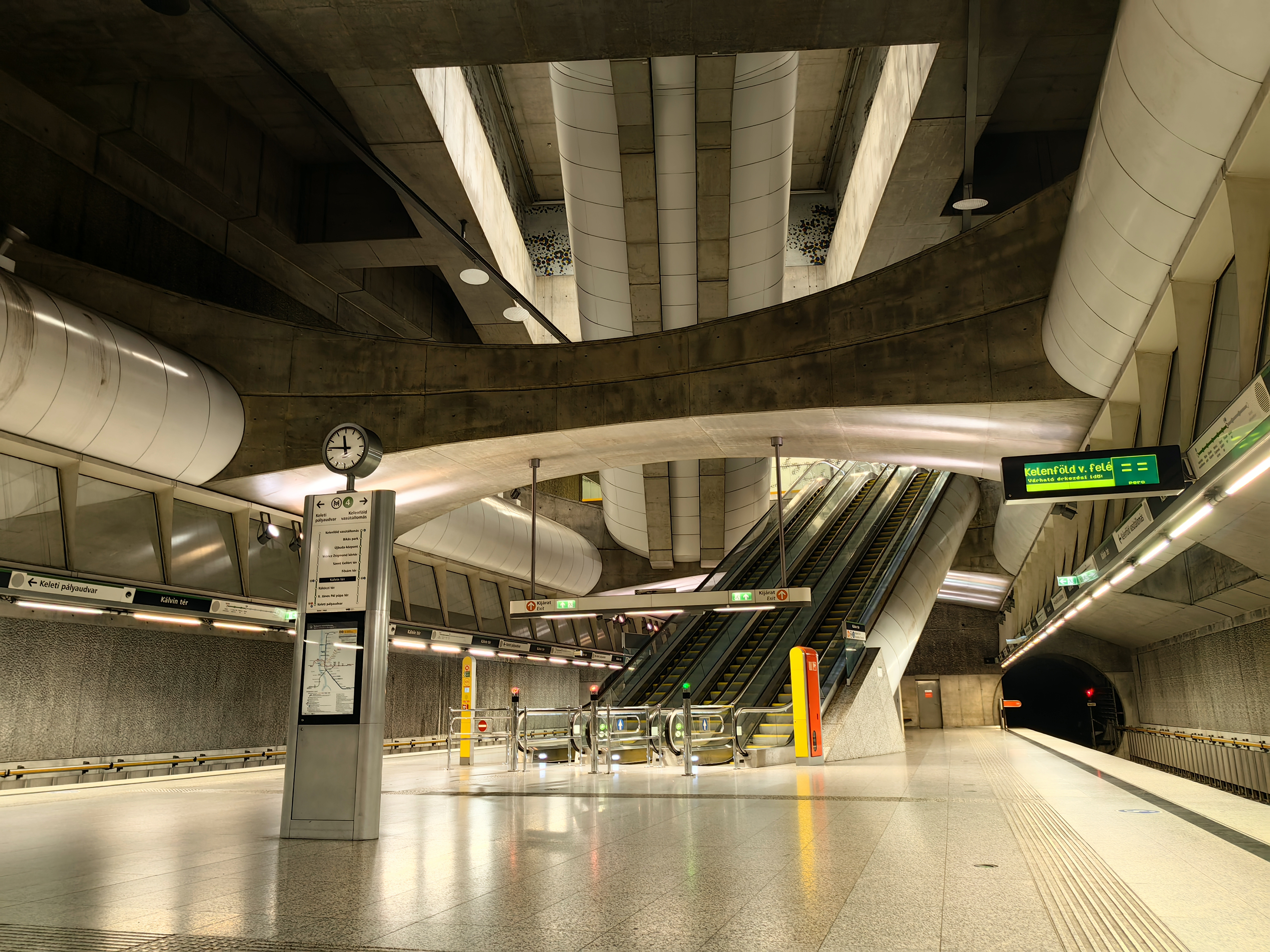
- Top: Örs vezér tere, terminus of metro line M2; Bottom: Metro line M4, a driverless metro line with real-time PIDS system at Kálvin tér, transfer station to metro line M3

Overview
- Native name: Budapesti metró
- Owner: Capital City of Budapest
- Locale: Budapest, Hungary
- Transit type: Rapid transit
- Number of lines: 4
- Number of stations: 52
- Daily ridership: 1.27 million (2009)
- Annual ridership: 382.6 million (2023)
- Website: BKK Public Transport

Operation
- Began operation: 2 May 1896; 130 years ago
- Operators: Centre for Budapest Transport; Budapest Transport Ltd. (BKV)

Technical
- System length: 39.4 km (24.5 mi)
- Track gauge: 1,435 mm (4 ft 8 1/2 in) (standard gauge)
- Top speed: 80 km/h (50 mph)

The Budapest Metro (Hungarian: Budapesti metró, pronounced [ˈbudɒpɛʃti ˈmɛtroː]) is the rapid transit system of the Hungarian capital Budapest. Opened in 1896, it is the world's second oldest electrified underground railway after the City and South London Railway (1890), and the third oldest underground railway with multiple stations after the originally steam-powered Metropolitan Railway (1863), both now part of the London Underground, and the Mersey Railway, now part of Merseyrail in Liverpool (1886). Between 1970 and 1990 the metro was extended with metro line M2 and M3. Metro line M4 was completed in 2014, though not all the originally planned stations were finished. Since 2014 the length of the entire metro system is 39.4 kilometers and it has 52 stations.

Budapest's first line, Line 1, was completed in 1896. The M1 line became an IEEE Milestone due to the radically new innovations in its era: "Among the railway's innovative elements were bidirectional tram cars; electric lighting in the subway stations and tram cars; and an overhead wire structure instead of a third-rail system for power." In 2002, the M1 line was listed as a UNESCO World Heritage Site.

== History ==
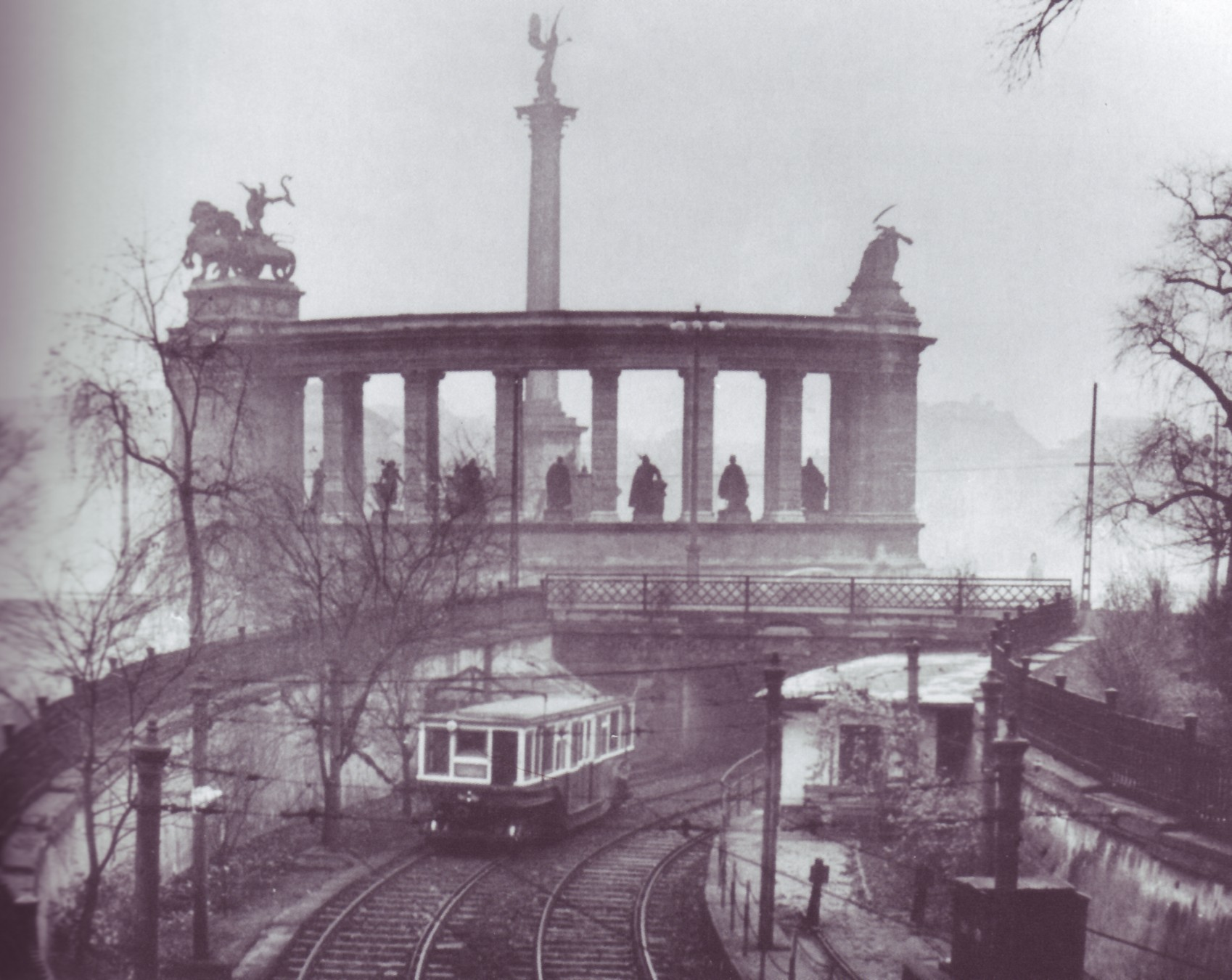
Old surface alignment of Millennium Underground at Heroes' Square

An old image of the first metro line on Andrássy Avenue

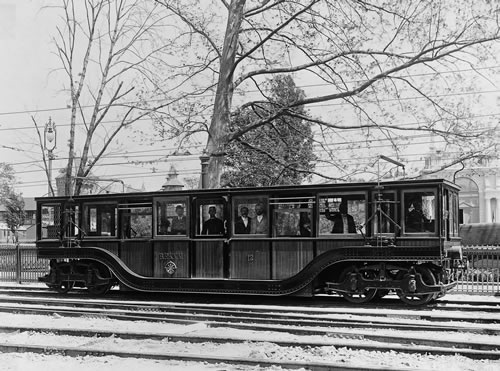
A train in 1896

Budapest Metro
UNESCO World Heritage Site
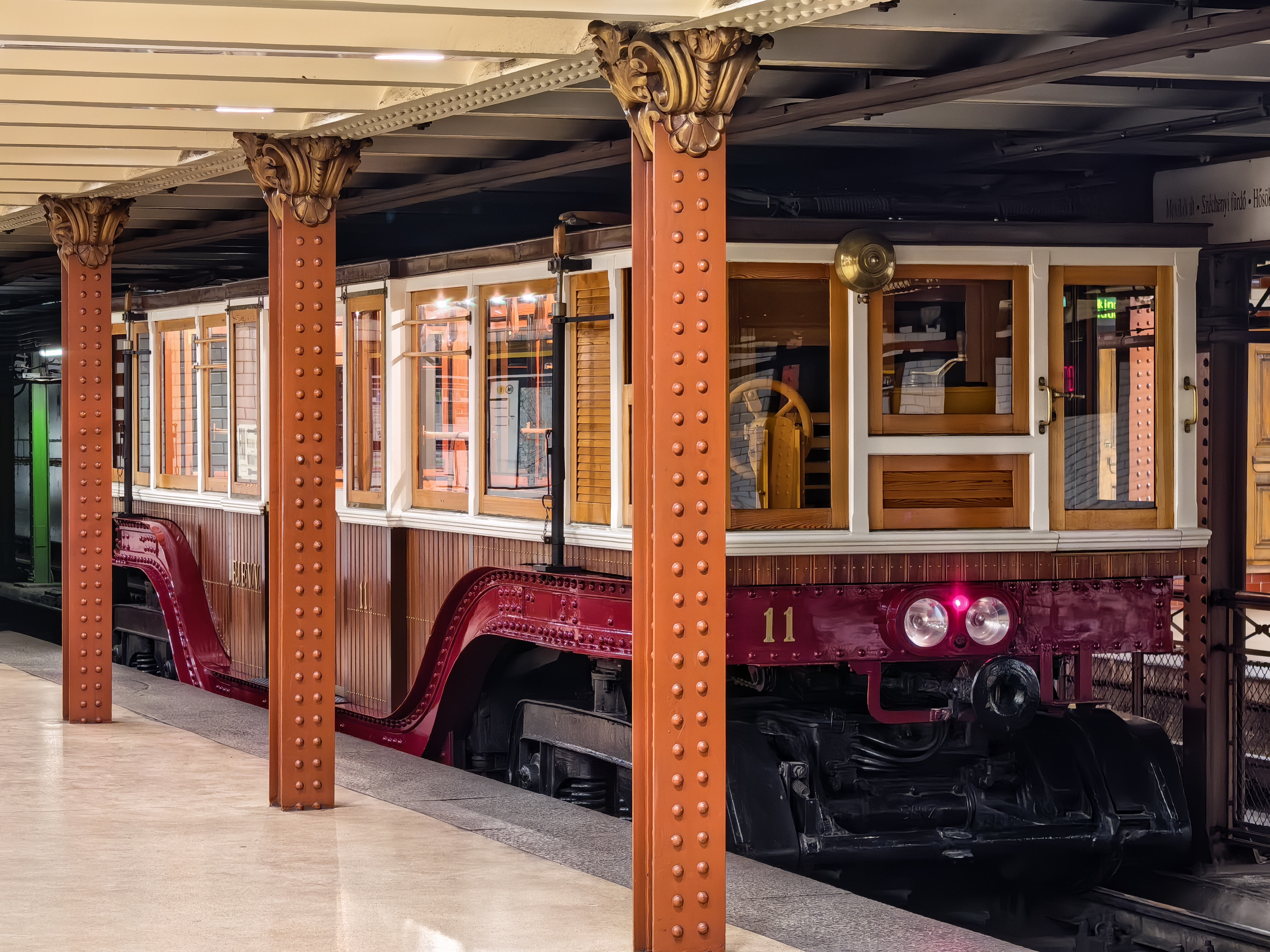
- Schlick train at Opera station

- Location within Hungary Location within Budapest
- Official name: Andrássy Avenue and the Underground
- Location: Budapest, Hungary
- Part of: Budapest, including the Banks of the Danube, the Buda Castle Quarter and Andrássy Avenue
- Criteria: Cultural: (ii), (iv)
- Reference: 400bis-002
- Inscription: 1987 (11th Session)
- Extensions: 2002
- Area: 57.85 ha (0.2234 sq mi)
- Buffer zone: 239.61 ha (0.9251 sq mi)
- Website: https://www.bkv.hu/
- Coordinates: 47°29′19″N 19°5′13″E

The Budapest Metro is either the oldest or 2nd oldest underground urban railway in continental Europe. While the original metro line M1 of the Budapest metro is the oldest electrified underground railway on the continent, the oldest fully underground urban railway in continental Europe is the Tünel line in Istanbul, built in 1875. However, since Tünel is a funicular railway, it may or may not be considered a "metro", in the classic sense.

The original line M1 ("Földalatti", from Hungarian föld "earth, ground", alatt "under"; so "the underground") ran for 5 km (3.1 mi) from Vörösmarty tér to Széchenyi fürdő. Line M1 was inaugurated on 2 May 1896, the year of the millennium (the thousandth anniversary of the arrival of the Magyars), by emperor Franz Joseph. It was named "Franz Joseph Underground Electric Railway Company" ("Ferenc József Földalatti Villamos Vasút Rt.").

Works on line M2 started in the 1950s, although the first section did not open until 1970. It follows an east–west route, connecting the major Keleti (Eastern) and Déli (Southern) railway stations.

Planning for Metro Line 3 began in 1963 and construction started in 1970 with help of Soviet specialists. The first section, consisting of six stations, opened in 1976. It was extended to the south in 1980 with five additional stations, and to the north in 1981, 1984, and 1990, with nine additional stations. With a length of approximately 16 kilometres (9.9 mi) and a total of 20 stations, it is the longest line in Budapest.

Construction of the fourth Metro line began in 2006. The line opened after several delays and budget overruns in May 2014.

== Routes ==
The metro consists of four lines (M1–M4), each denoted by a different colour. M1 (yellow) runs from Mexikói út south-west towards the Danube. The M2 (red) line travels east–west through the city, crossing the river. The M3 (blue) runs in a broadly north–south alignment, interchanging with the three other lines. The M4 (green) line commences at Keleti pályaudvar and travels south-west, crossing the river, to terminate at Kelenföld vasútállomás.

Line	Color	Name and Route	Year of opening	Latest extension	Length (km)	Number of stations
	Yellow	Line M1 (Vörösmarty tér ↔ Mexikói út)	1896	1973	4.4	11
	Red	Line M2 (Déli pályaudvar ↔ Örs vezér tere)	1970	1972	10.3	11
	Blue	Line M3 (Újpest-Központ ↔ Kőbánya-Kispest)	1976	1990	17.3	20
	Green	Line M4 (Keleti pályaudvar ↔ Kelenföld vasútállomás)	2014	-	7.3	10
Total:					39.4	52

=== Metro line M1 ===
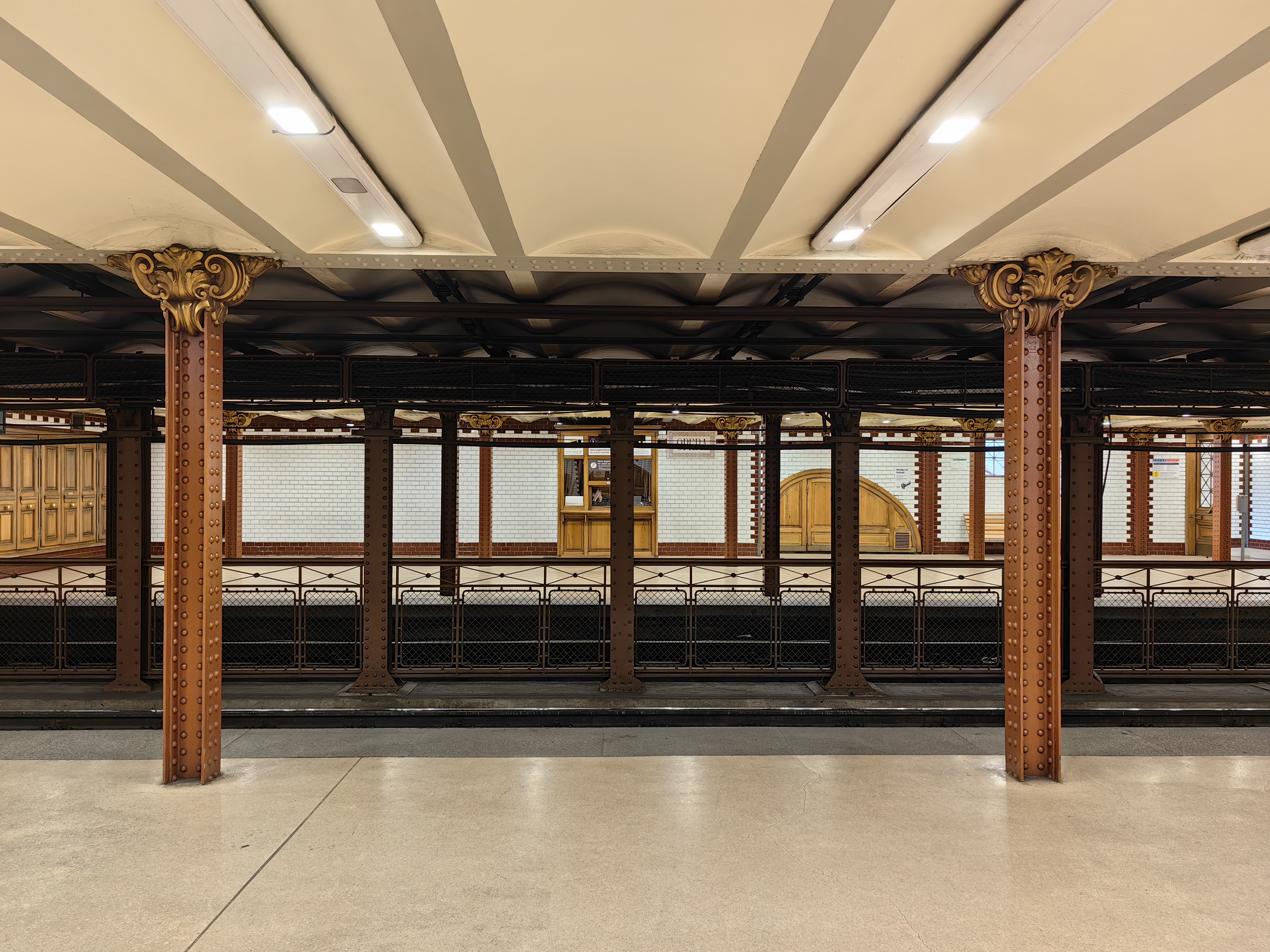
Metro line M1 - Opera station (originally opened in 1896, reconstructed in 1973 and 1995)

Line M1 runs northeast from the city centre on the Pest side under Andrássy út to the Városliget, or City Park. Like line M3, it does not serve Buda. Metro line M1, the oldest of the metro lines operating in Budapest, has been in constant operation since 1896. In the 1980s and 1990s, the line underwent major reconstruction. During the construction of line M2, space needed to be made for its station at Deák Ferenc tér, as a result, M1's station at Deák Ferenc tér had to be rebuilt approximately 40 meters from the original station. Of its 11 stations currently served, eight are original and three were added during the reconstruction. The original appearance of the old stations has been preserved, and each station features displays of historical photographs and information. As part of the reconstruction, the Millennium Underground Museum in the old station at Deák Ferenc tér connected to the concourse. There are plans for the future extension of the line in both directions.

=== Metro line M2 ===
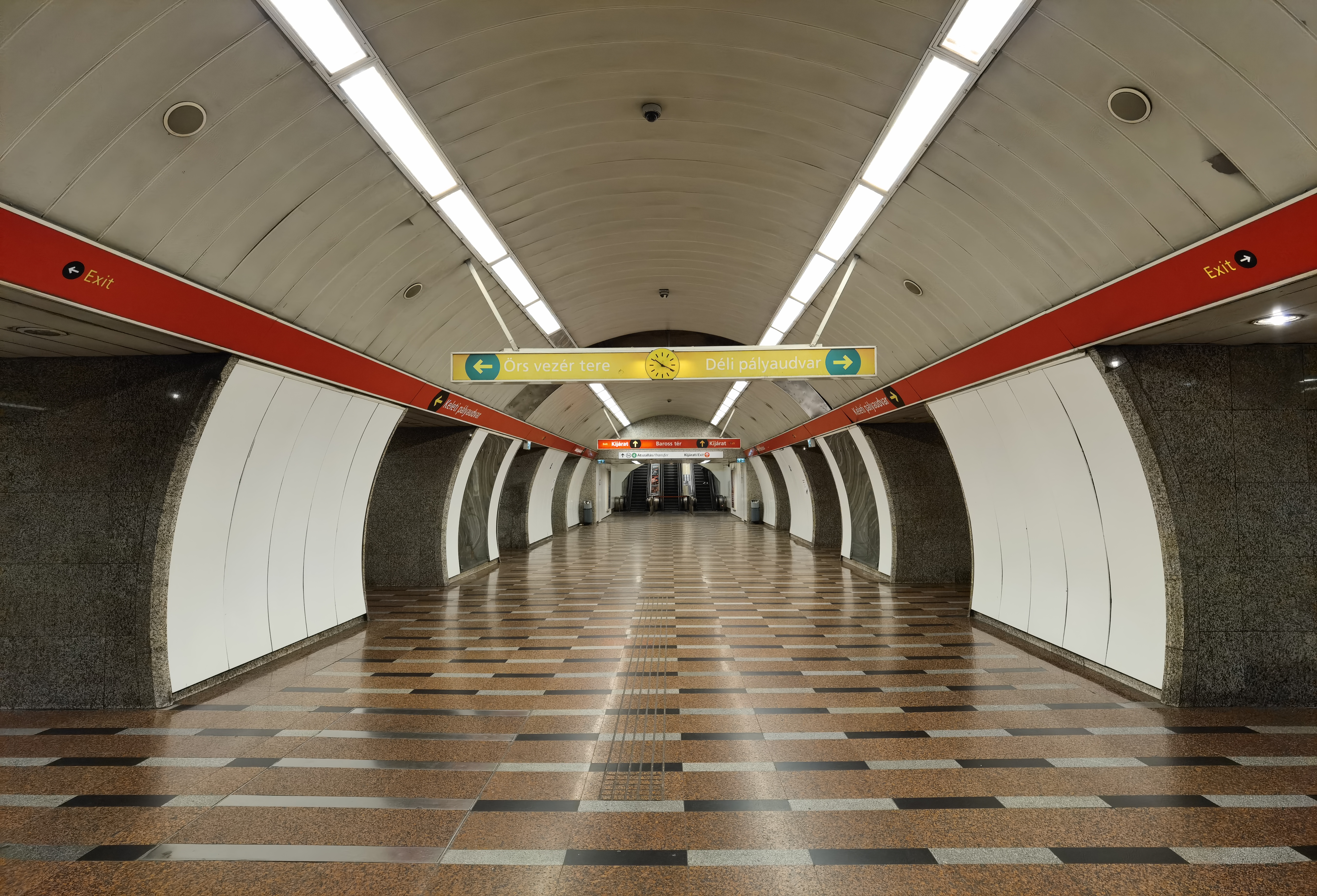
Metro line M2 - Keleti pályaudvar station (originally opened in 1970, reconstructed in 2005)

Line M2 runs east–west from Déli pályaudvar in Buda's Krisztinaváros, through the city center, to Örs vezér tere in eastern Pest. It offers connections to Hungarian State Railways at Déli and Keleti pályaudvars, to metro lines M1 and M3 at Deák Ferenc tér, to M4 at Keleti pályaudvar, to suburban railway lines H8 and H9 at Örs vezér tere, and to suburban railway line H5 at Batthyány tér. Prior to the opening of M4, it was (for more than 45 years) the only metro line that served the Buda side of the city. Metro Line 2 underwent a major reconstruction in the second half of the 2000s, with all of the track replaced and stations revamped by 2007. The entire fleet of Metrovagonmash 81-717/81-714 and Ev/EvA carriages operating on the line were replaced with Alstom Metropolis metro cars by 2013. Planning of a direct connection of line M2 and the suburban railway lines with a shared new station at Örs vezér tere and the addition of a potential new underground station near Hungexpo Budapest Congress and Exhibition Center, offering another interchange point to mainline railways began in 2021.

=== Metro line M3 ===
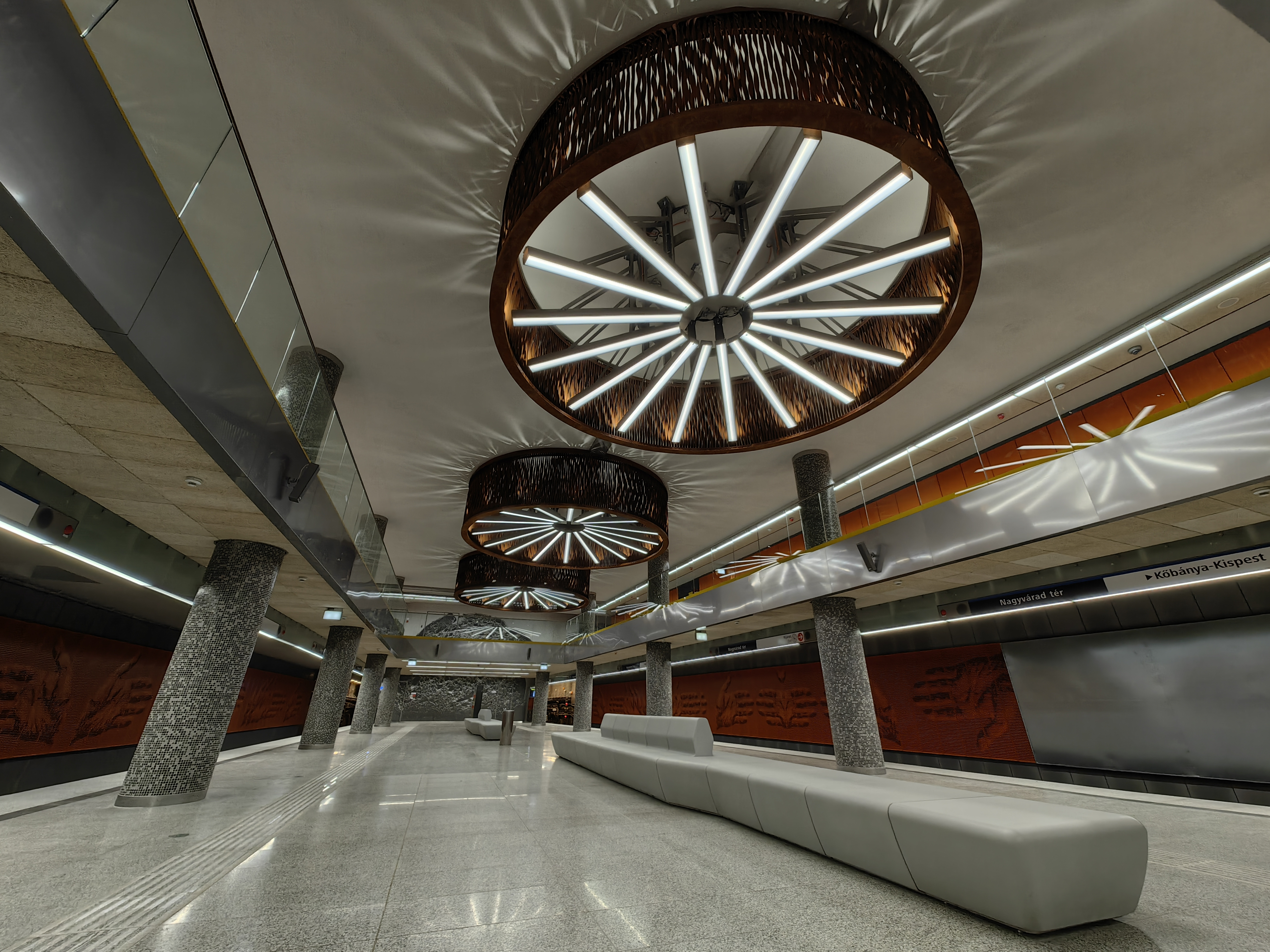
Metro line M3 - Nagyvárad tér station (originally opened in 1976, reconstructed 2022–2023)

Line M3 runs from north-northeast to southeast on the Pest side of the river and connects several populous residential areas with the Inner City. It has a transfer station with line M1 and line M2 at Deák Ferenc tér, and an interchange with line M4 at Kálvin tér. It is the longest line in the Budapest metro system, its daily ridership is estimated at 610,000. A semi-automatic train drive system was introduced in 1990. A complete renovation of the line started in 2017. The upgrades included reconstructing the stations, rebuilding the track, safety equipment, ventilation and tunnel insulation. Design works were entirely funded by the European Union under the New Széchenyi Plan. The project also included the renovation of the rolling stock and a possible extension of the metro line to Káposztásmegyer. The renovation finished in May 2023, with the opening of Nagyvárad tér and Lehel tér stations.

On 22 July 2026, it was announced that the north-end of the line will be extended overground with two stations until Rákospaolta-Újpest vasútállomás under the Baross Gábor Rail-improvement Program. The extension is to be finished by the end of 2030. As of November 2026 work is yet to begin.

=== Metro line M4 ===
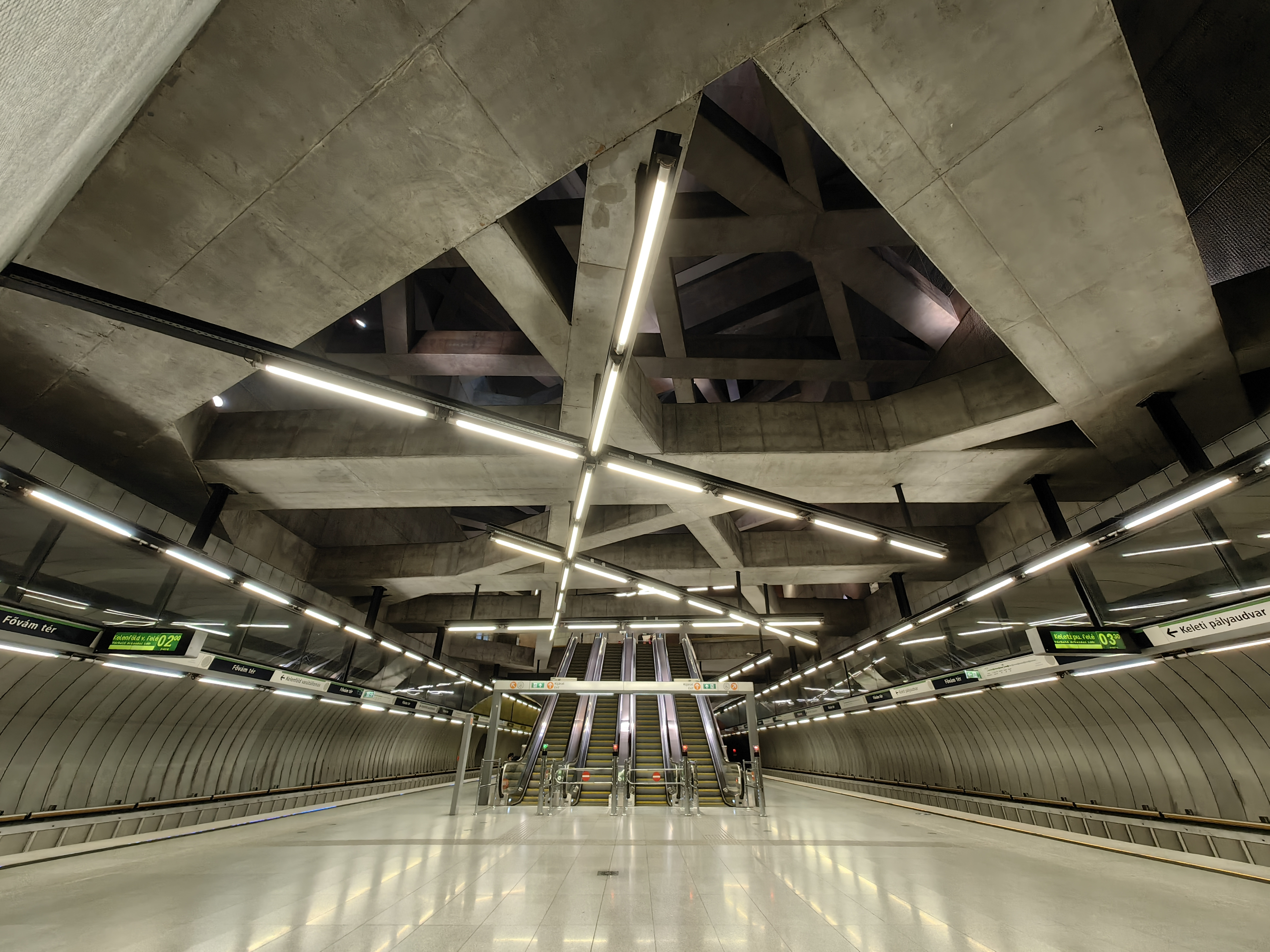
Metro line M4 - Fővám tér station (opened in 2014)

Line M4 runs southwest–northeast from Kelenföld vasútállomás in Buda's Kelenföld neighborhood to Keleti Railway Station in Józsefváros. With a length of 7.4 kilometres (4.6 mi), it connects to Hungarian State Railways at its termini, to the metro line M3 at Kálvin tér, and to line M2 at Keleti pályaudvar. Line M4 was completed in March 2014 and comprises ten stations.

== Future expansion ==
=== Metro line M5 ===
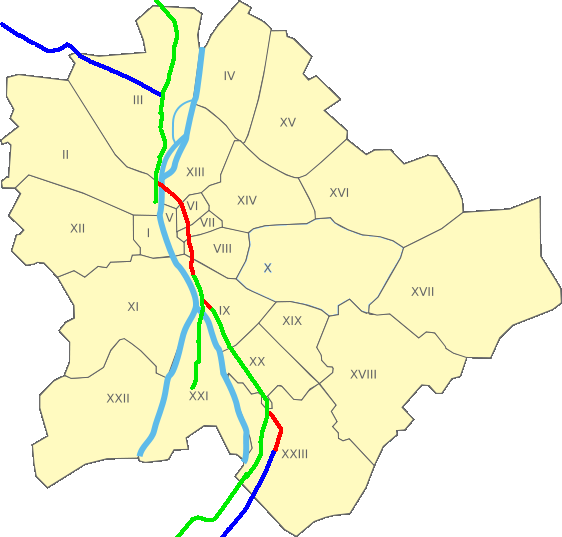
The green lines show the existing H5, H6 and H7 lines; the red lines are the proposed connections under the city to form line M5; and the blue lines are existing railway lines that could also be connected

Metro line M5 is a proposed north–south railway tunnel to connect the currently separated elements of the suburban rail network, namely the H5, H6 and H7 suburban railway lines, and optionally the Budapest-Esztergom and Budapest-Kunszentmiklós-Tass railway lines. Currently the project does not have mainstream political support, only included in long-term plans. The first phase (planned until 2030) would be the extension and connection of the southern H6 and H7 lines to Astoria metro station via Kálvin tér, thus connecting these lines to metro lines M2, M3 and M4. The second phase would create a connection to metro line M1 as well at Oktogon, M3 at Lehel tér then cross the Danube to the Buda side to connect suburban railway line H5 towards Szentendre.

== Rolling stock ==
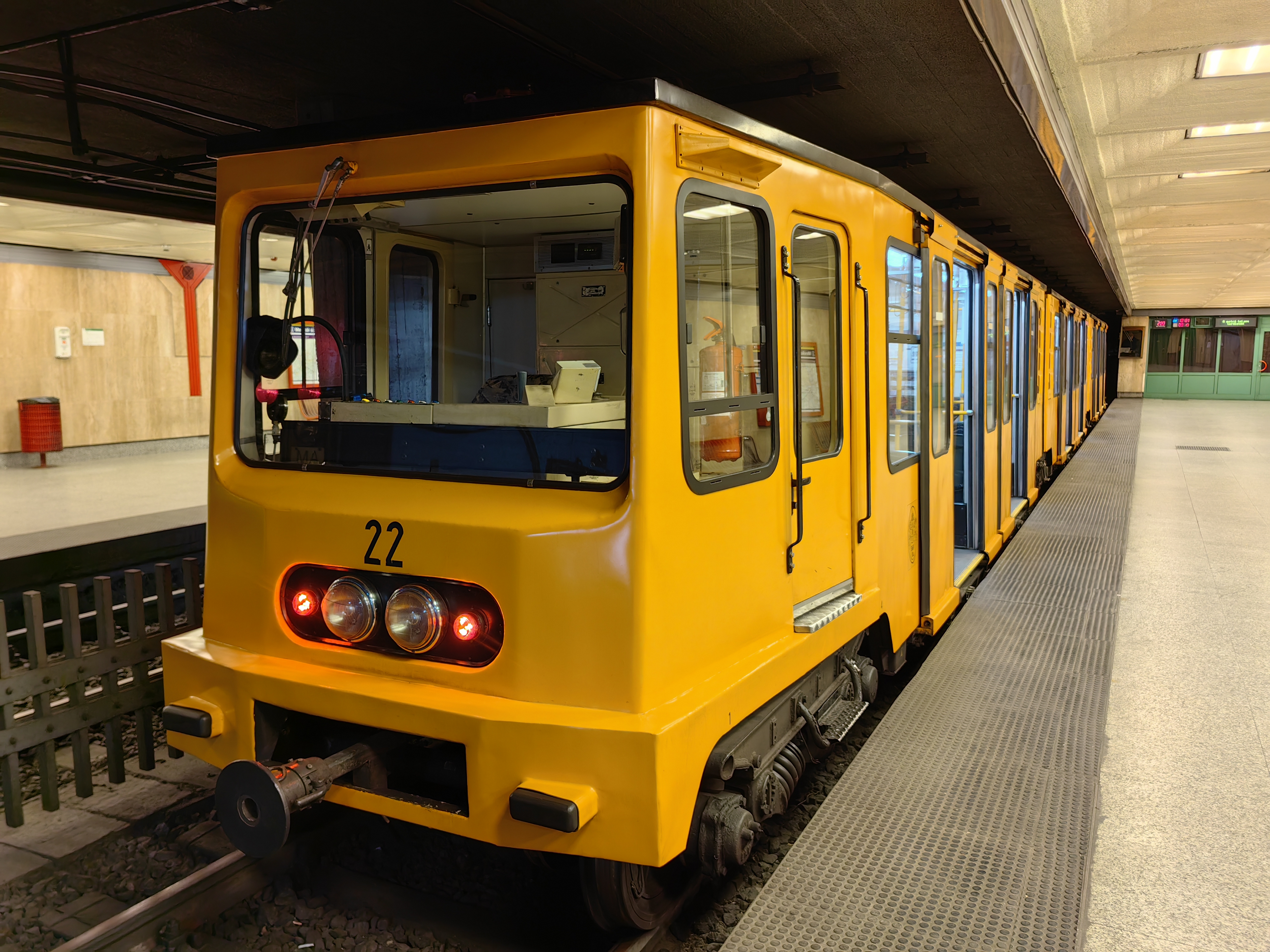
Ganz MFAV – operating on line M1 since 1973

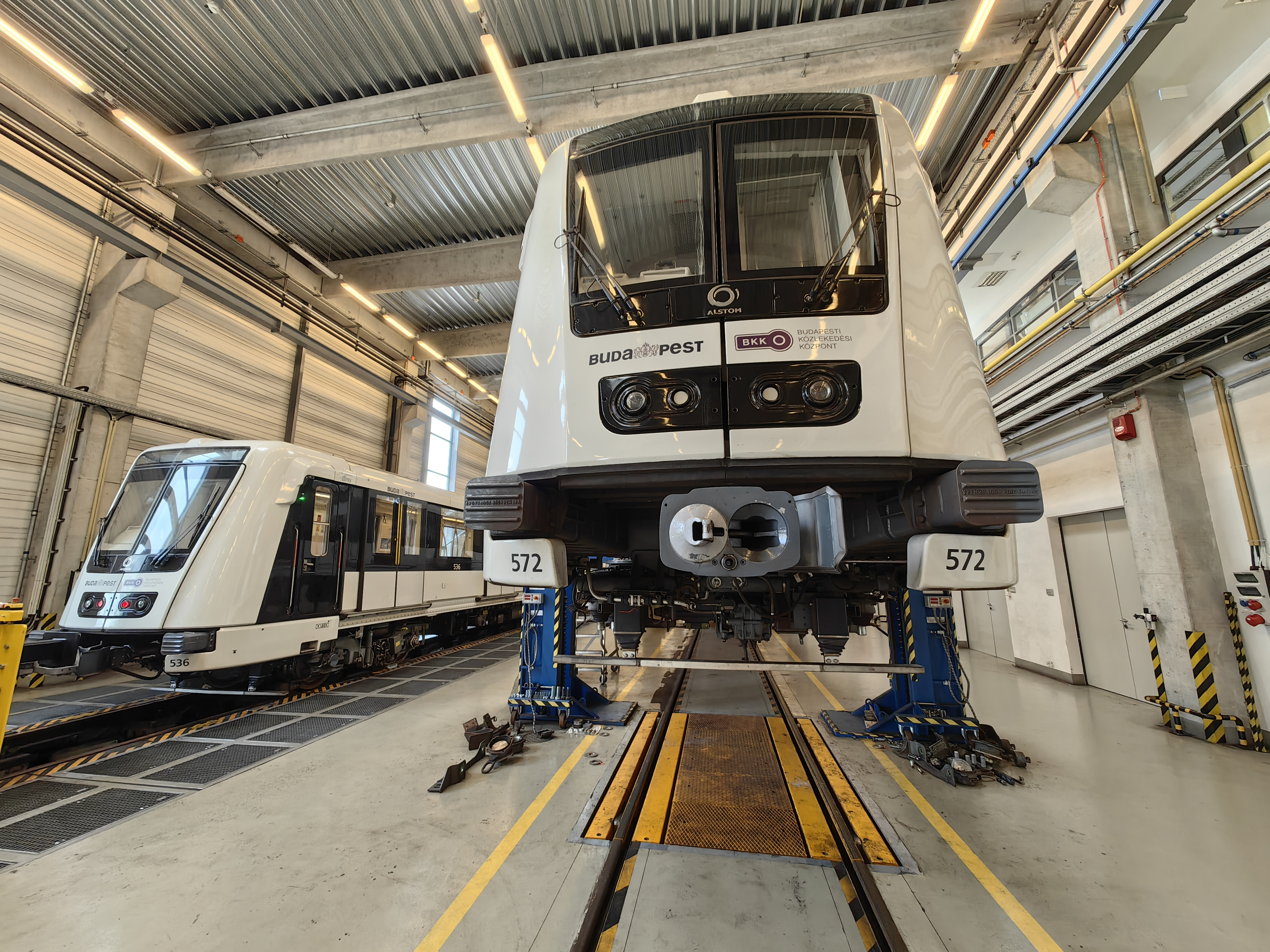
Alstom Metropolis – operating on line M2 since 2012 and on line M4 since its opening in 2014

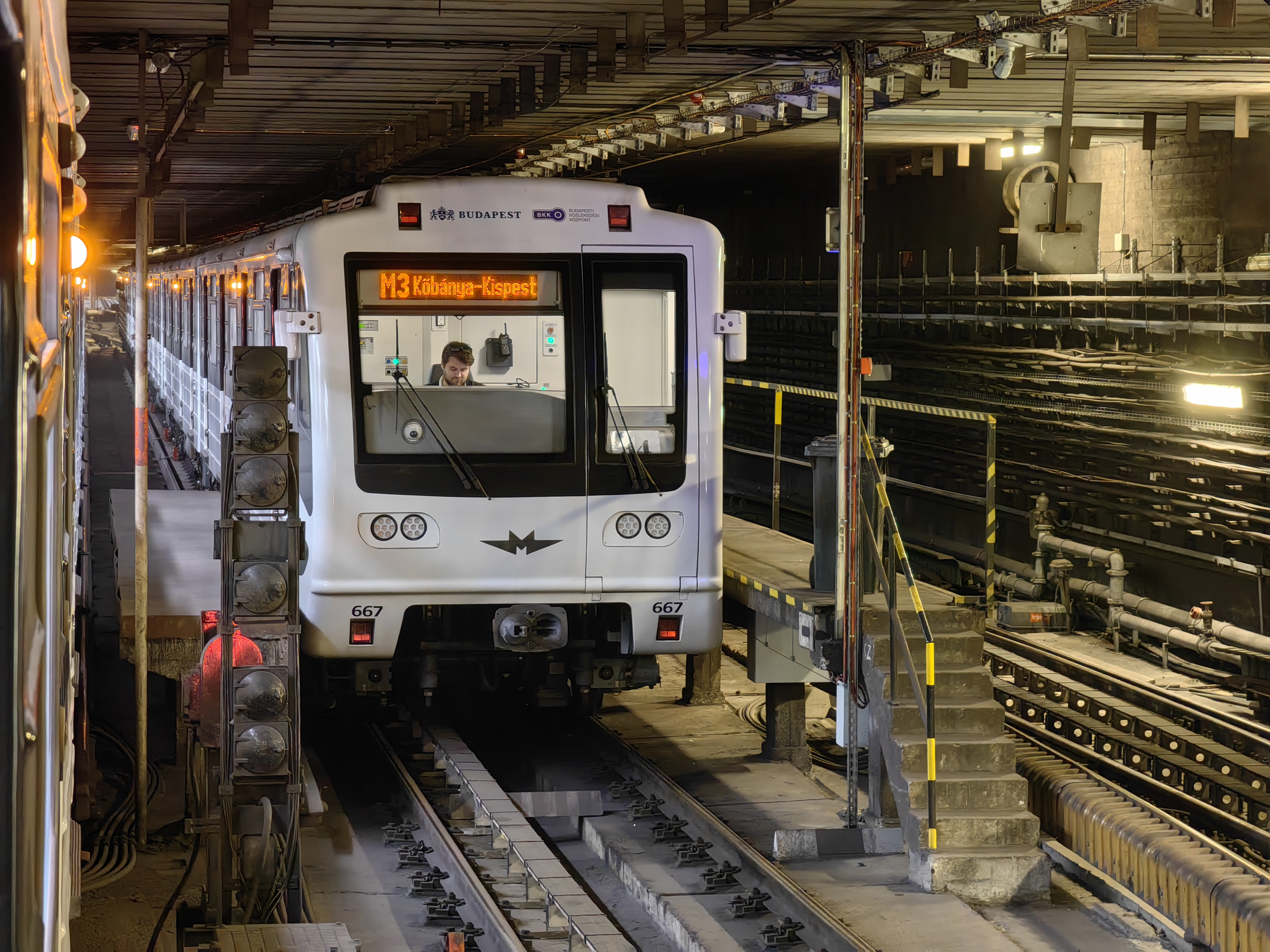
Metrowagonmash 81-717.2K/714.2K – refurbished versions of the old carriages that ran on lines M2 and M3; operating on line M3 since 2017

== General information ==
=== Tickets and transfer system ===
The usual BKK tickets and passes can be used on all lines. Single tickets can be re-used when changing metro lines.

There is an automated fare collection system. A contract for a system was signed in 2014, but terminated in 2018 without completion. The Budapest Pay&GO system, that was introduced on bus line 100E in June 2023, has been available from 22 April 2026 on all metro lines as well.

Starting 1st March 2024, free public transport has been extended for children up to 14 years, and for people 65 years or older including non-Hungarian citizens.

== In popular culture ==
The internationally acclaimed 2003 Hungarian thriller Kontroll is set and was filmed in the metro system on lines M2 and M3.

== See also ==
- List of metro systems
- List of automated urban metro subway systems
