= Astoria metro station =

Budapest metro station

Astoria
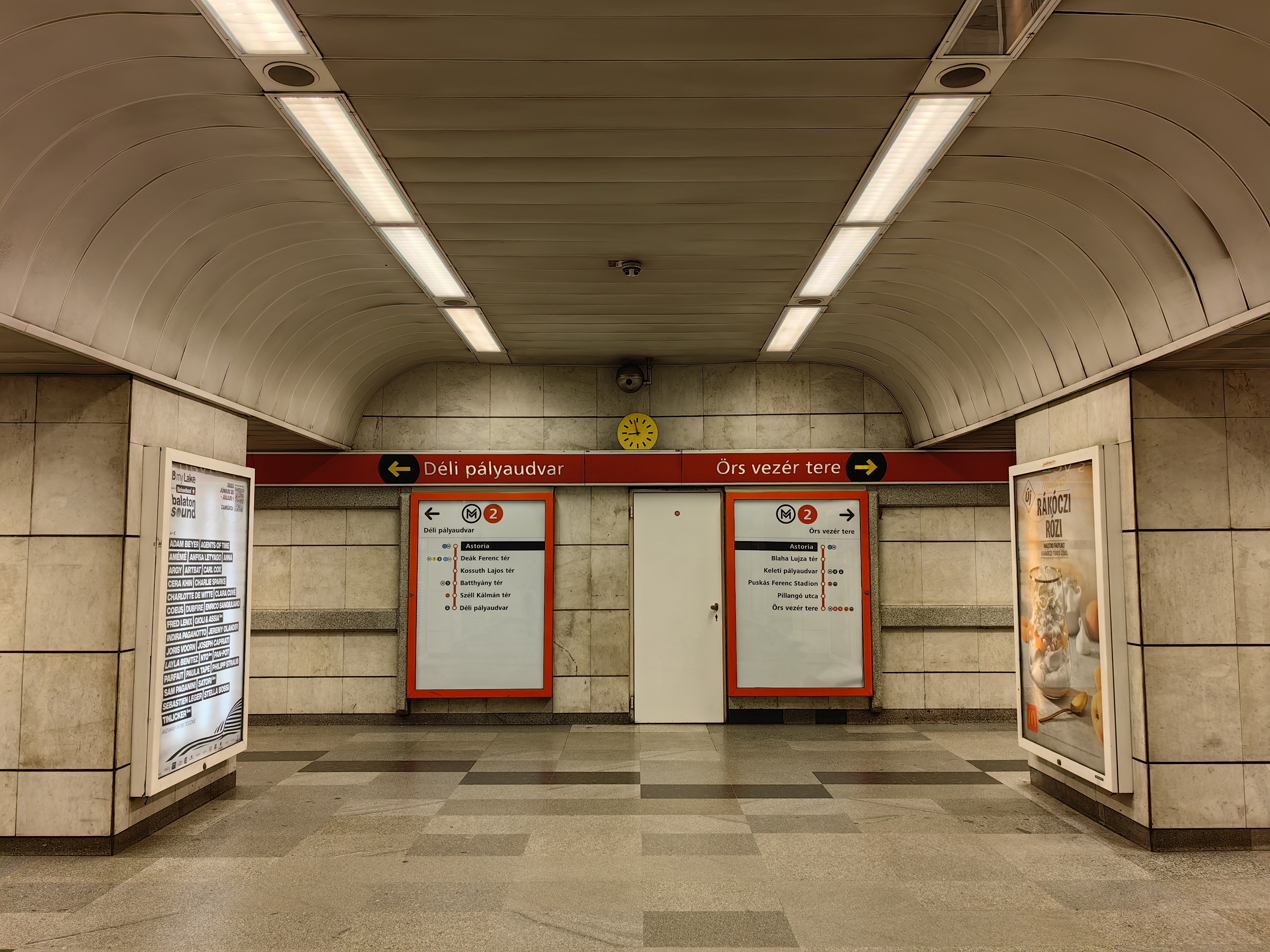

General information
- Coordinates: 47°29′40″N 19°03′36″E
- System: Budapest Metro station
- Platforms: 1 island platform

Construction
- Structure type: bored underground
- Depth: 29.7 metres (97 ft)

History
- Opened: 2 April 1970
- Rebuilt: 2005

Services
Preceding station	Budapest Metro	Following station
Deák Ferenc tér towards Déli pályaudvar	Line 2	Blaha Lujza tér towards Örs vezér tere
Location

Astoria is a station of the M2 (East-West) line of the Budapest Metro, under the eponymous square, Astoria. The station was renovated from 2003 to 2004. It was opened on 2 April 1970 as part of the inaugural section of Line M2, between Deák Ferenc tér and Örs vezér tere.

== Connections ==
- Tram
  - 47 Deák Ferenc tér – Városház tér
  - 48 Deák Ferenc tér – Savoya Park
  - 49 Deák Ferenc tér – Kelenföld vasútállomás
- Trolleybus
  - 72 Zugló vasútállomás – Orczy tér
  - 74 Csáktornya park – Károly körút (Astoria)
- Bus: 5, 7, 8E, 9, 100E, 107, 108E, 110, 112, 133E
