= Puskás Ferenc Stadion metro station =

Budapest metro station

Puskás Ferenc Stadion
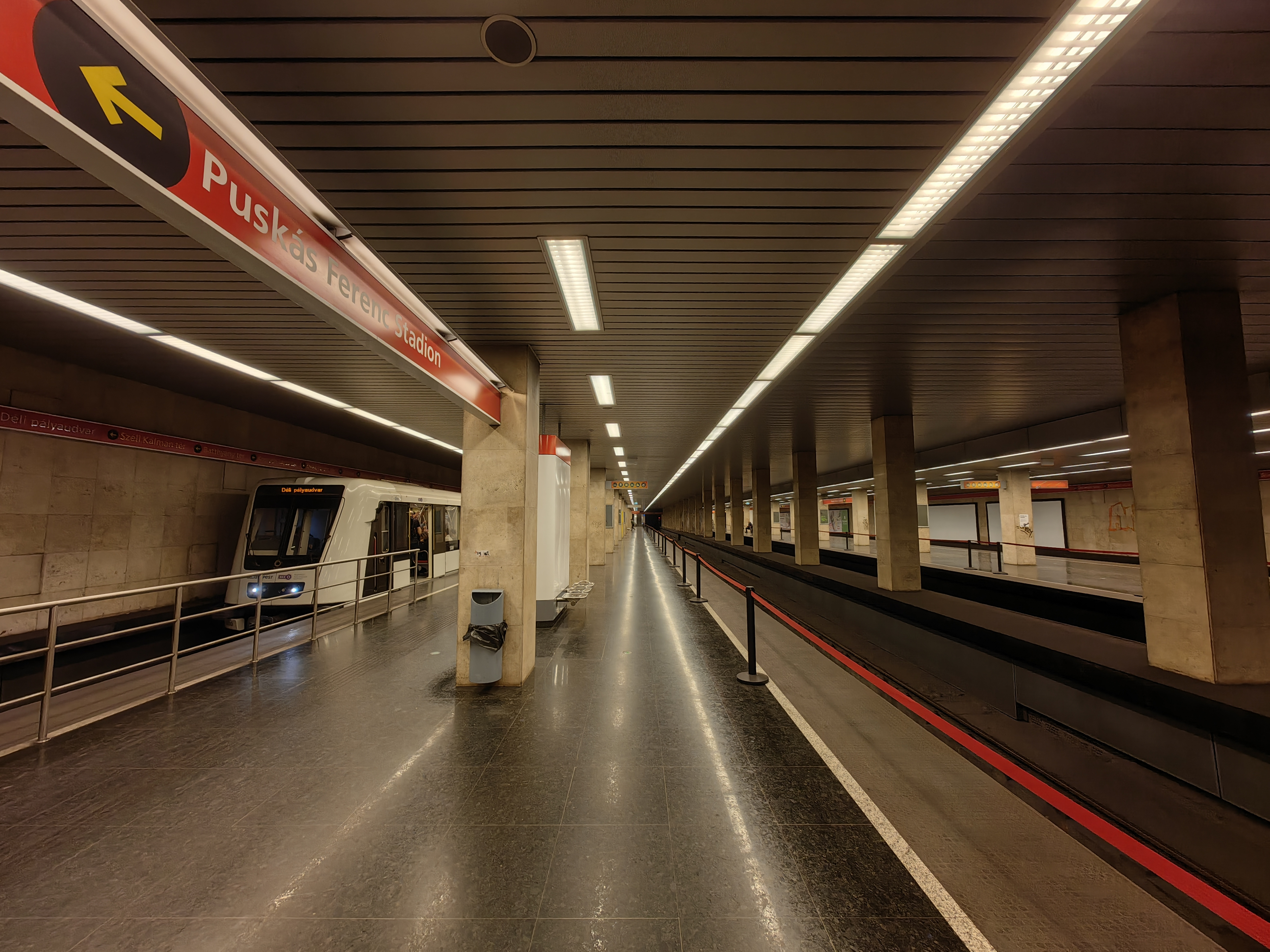

General information
- Location: Budapest; Hungary
- Coordinates: 47°30′00″N 19°06′21″E
- System: Budapest Metro station
- Platforms: 2 island platforms

Construction
- Structure type: cut-and-cover underground
- Depth: 4.71 metres (15.5 ft)

History
- Opened: 2 April 1970

Services
Preceding station	Budapest Metro	Following station
Keleti pályaudvar towards Déli pályaudvar	Line 2	Pillangó utca towards Örs vezér tere
Location

Puskás Ferenc Stadion (Puskás Aréna) is a station of the M2 (East-West) line of the Budapest Metro. Puskás Aréna is located here, as well as the Budapest Sports Arena.

It was first opened on 2 April 1970 as part of the inaugural section of Line 2, between Deák Ferenc tér and Örs vezér tere and named Népstadion (English: People's Stadium) until 1 January 2004. Between 2004 and 2011 the station's name was Stadionok (Stadiums). It is located in the 14th district of Budapest.

== Connections ==
- Bus: 95, 130, 195
- Tram: 1, 1A
- Trolleybus: 75, 77, 80
