= Metro Line M2 (Budapest Metro) =

Rapid transit line in Budapest, Hungary

Overview
- Status: Operational
- Line number: Line 2 ("Red metro")
- Termini: Déli pályaudvar; Örs vezér tere
- Stations: 11

Service
- Type: Rapid transit
- System: Budapest Metro
- Operator(s): BKV
- Rolling stock: AM5-M2

History
- Opened: 2 April 1970
- Last extension: 1972

Technical
- Line length: 10.3 km (6.4 mi)
- Track gauge: 1,435 mm (4 ft 8 1/2 in)
- Electrification: 825 V DC
- Operating speed: 70 km/h
Route map
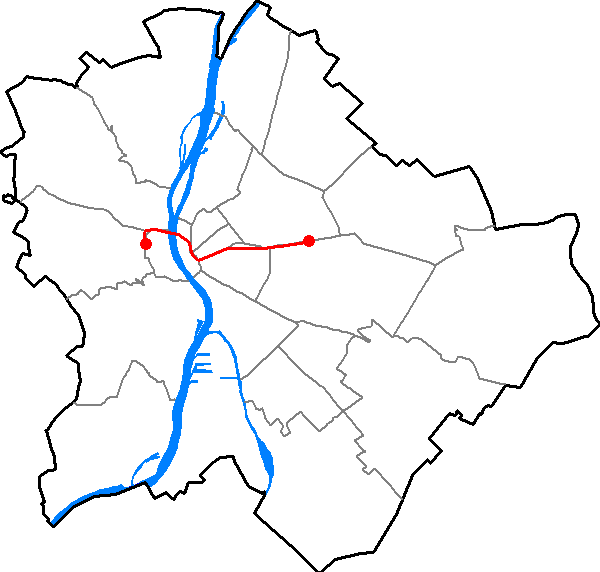

Line 2 (officially: East-West Line, Metro 2 or M2, and unofficially: Red Line) is the second line of the Budapest Metro. The line runs east from Déli pályaudvar in north-central Buda under the Danube to the city center, from where it continues east following the route of Rákóczi út to its terminus at Örs vezér tere.

Prior to the 2014 opening of Line 4, this was the only line that served Buda. Daily ridership is estimated at 350,000.

== History ==
The first plans for the second Budapest metro line were made in 1942, and the Council of Ministers authorised its construction in 1950. Line 2 was originally planned to connect two major railway stations, Keleti (Eastern) and Déli (Southern) pályaudvar. The Council of Ministers wanted to complete the first section by 1954 between Deák Ferenc tér and Népstadion (today Puskás Ferenc Stadion), and the second section by 1955 between Déli pályaudvar and Deák Ferenc tér. Construction was suspended for financial and political reasons from 1954 till 1963. The ruling Hungarian Socialist Workers' Party decided to restart the construction at a party congress in 1959. It was finally opened with seven stations on April 2 (then a Communist holiday in Hungary) in 1970, and the second section in 1972. The eastern end of the line was extended to Örs vezér tere, instead of Népstadion. Operation started in 1970 with 3-car trains, expanded to 4-car trains soon after, and 5-car trains since 1972. A major reconstruction of the track and stations was undertaken between 2004 and 2008, with new trains arriving in 2010. The new trains went into service two years later, in September 2012, and by April 2013 the line was solely served by new trains.

On December 5, 2016, an accident occurred on the line which involved an AM5-M2 rolling stock. An incoming train collided with a waiting train at the Pillangó utca metro station. This was the first serious accident in the history of the Budapest metro. The accident did not result in a fatality, but according to the prosecution, a total of twenty-one were injured, five of whom were classified as serious.

M2 runs in an east–west direction through the city, and it was the first metro line to cross the River Danube and reach Buda (the western part of Budapest). It has a transfer station with Line 1 and Line 3 at Deák Ferenc tér, and a transfer station for Line 4 at Keleti pályaudvar.

| Sections | Opened | Length | Stations |
|---|---|---|---|
| Deák Ferenc tér - Örs vezér tere | 1970 | 6.7 km (4.2 mi) | 7 |
| Déli pályaudvar - Deák Ferenc tér | 1972 | 3.6 km (2.2 mi) | 4 |
| Total | 1972 | 10.3 km (6.4 mi) | 11 |

== Rolling stock ==
| Time period | Name |
|---|---|
| 1970 – 2013 | Metrovagonmash Ev, Ev1 |
| 1980 – 2013 | Metrovagonmash 81-717.2/714.2 |
| 1998 – 2013 | Metrovagonmash 81-717.2M/714.2M |
| 2000 – 2013 | Metrovagonmash EvA |
| 2012 – present | Alstom Metropolis AM5-M2 |

== Stations and connections ==
Déli pályaudvar – Örs vezér tere
| Travel time min:sec | Station | Travel time min:sec | Connection | Buildings / monuments |
| 0:00 | Déli pályaudvar | 18:25 | 17, 56, 56A, 59, 59A, 59B, 61; 21, 21A, 39, 102, 139, 140, 140A, 221; Regional buses Hungarian State Railways (MÁV) | Déli pályaudvar |
| 1:40 | Széll Kálmán tér | 17:00 | 4, 6, 17, 56, 56A, 59, 59A, 59B, 61; 5, 16, 16A, 21, 21A, 22, 22A, 39, 91, 102, 116, 128, 129, 139, 140, 140A, 149, 155, 156, 221, 222; Regional buses | Post Palace Budapest, Városmajor |
| 3:27 | Batthyány tér | 15:12 | 19, 41; 11, 39, 111 | Batthyány tér Batthyány tér Market Hall |
| 4:55 | Kossuth Lajos tér | 13:45 | 2, 2B, 23; 70, 78; 15 | Hungarian Parliament Building, Ethnographic Museum |
| 6:55 | Deák Ferenc tér | 11:50 | 47, 48, 49; 72; 9, 16, 100E, 105, 178, 210, 210B, 216 | Deák Ferenc tér Town Hall, Metro Museum (Földalatti Vasúti Múzeum), St. Stephen's Basilica |
| 8:35 | Astoria | 10:07 | 47, 48, 49; 72, 74; 5, 7, 8E, 9, 107, 108E, 110, 112, 133E | ELTE-Faculty of Humanities (BTK), Danubius Hotel Astoria, Dohány Street Synagogue |
| 10:02 | Blaha Lujza tér | 8:40 | 4, 6, 28, 28A, 37, 37A, 62; 74; 5, 7, 7E, 8E, 99, 107, 108E, 110, 112, 133E, 217E | Boscolo Budapest Hotel |
| 11:50 | Keleti pályaudvar | 6:50 | 23, 24; 73, 76, 78, 79, 80; 5, 7, 7E, 8E, 20E, 30, 30A, 107, 108E, 110, 112, 133E, 230; Hungarian State Railways (MÁV) | Keleti pályaudvar Arena Plaza |
| 14:35 | Puskás Ferenc Stadion ♿ | 4:07 | 1, 1M; 75, 77, 80; 95, 130, 195; Regional buses Long-distance buses | Puskás Aréna, László Papp Budapest Sports Arena, Kisstadion |
| 16:25 | Pillangó utca ♿ | 2:10 | 10 | Kincsem Park |
| 19:25 | Örs vezér tere ♿ | 0:00 | 3, 62, 62A; 80, 82, 82A; 10, 31, 32, 44, 45, 67, 85, 85E, 97E, 131, 144, 161, 161A, 161E, 168E, 169E, 174, 176E, 231, 244, 276E, 277; Regional buses Long-distance buses | Örs vezér tere Árkád Budapest |

== Gallery ==
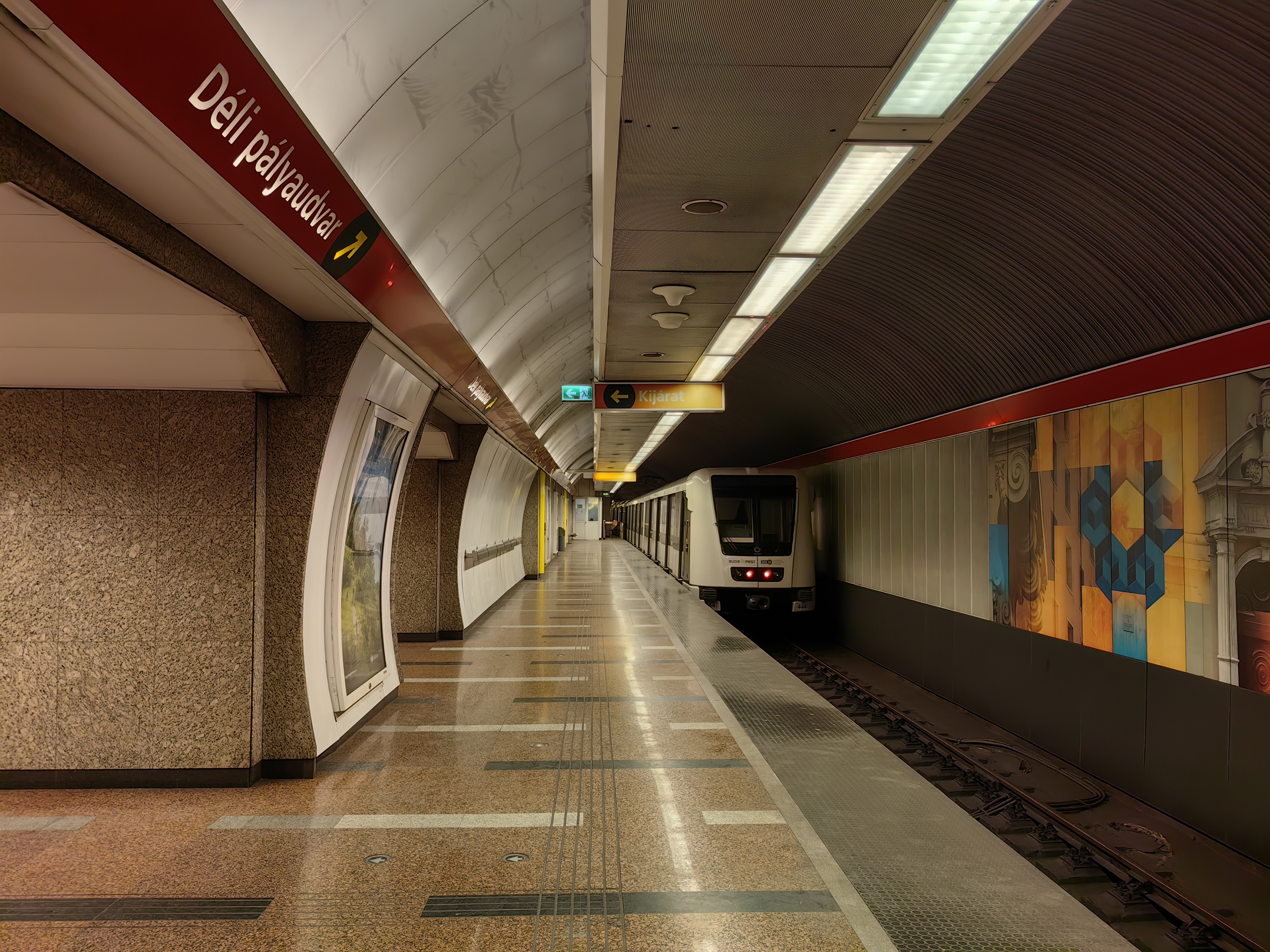

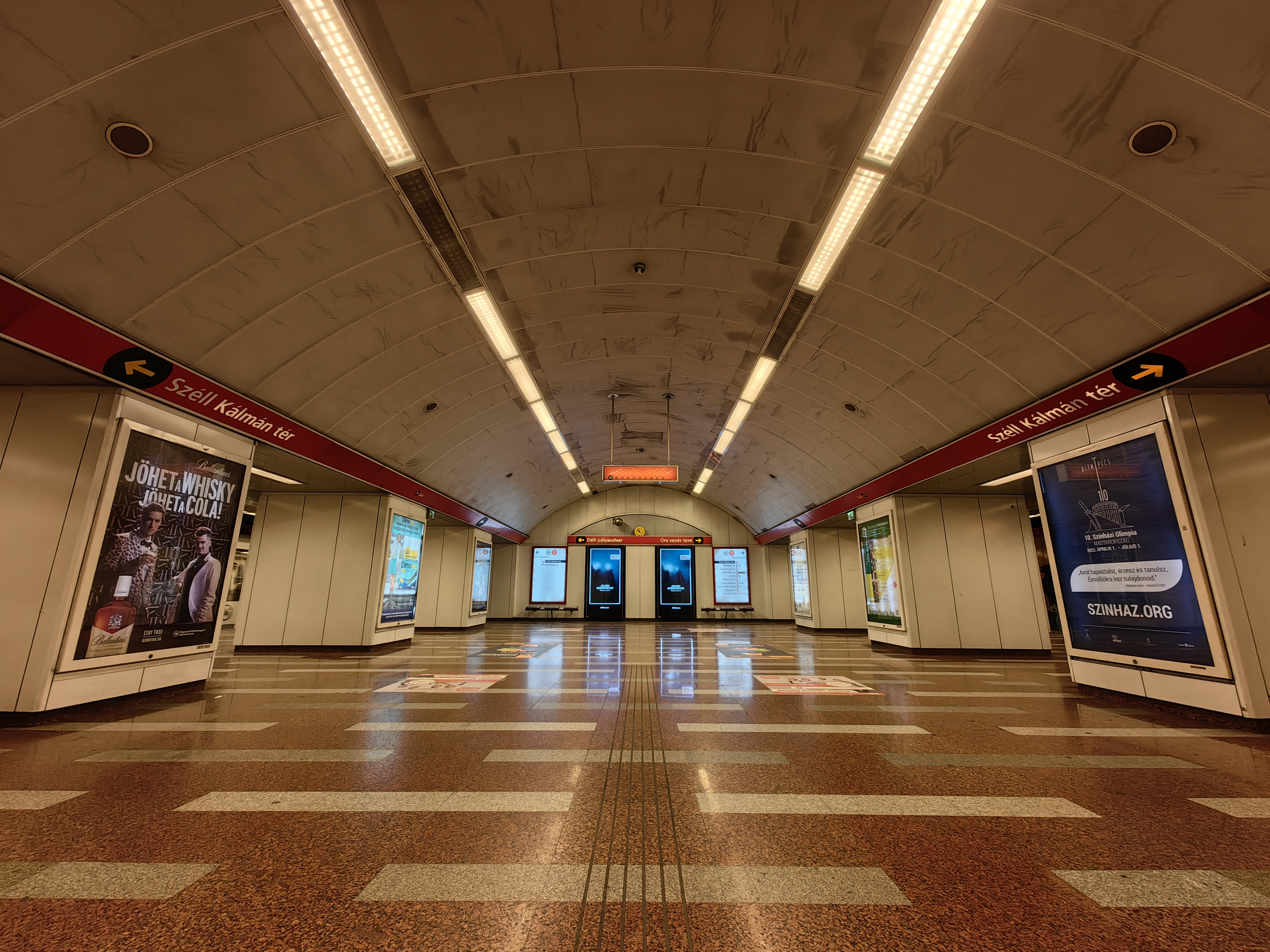

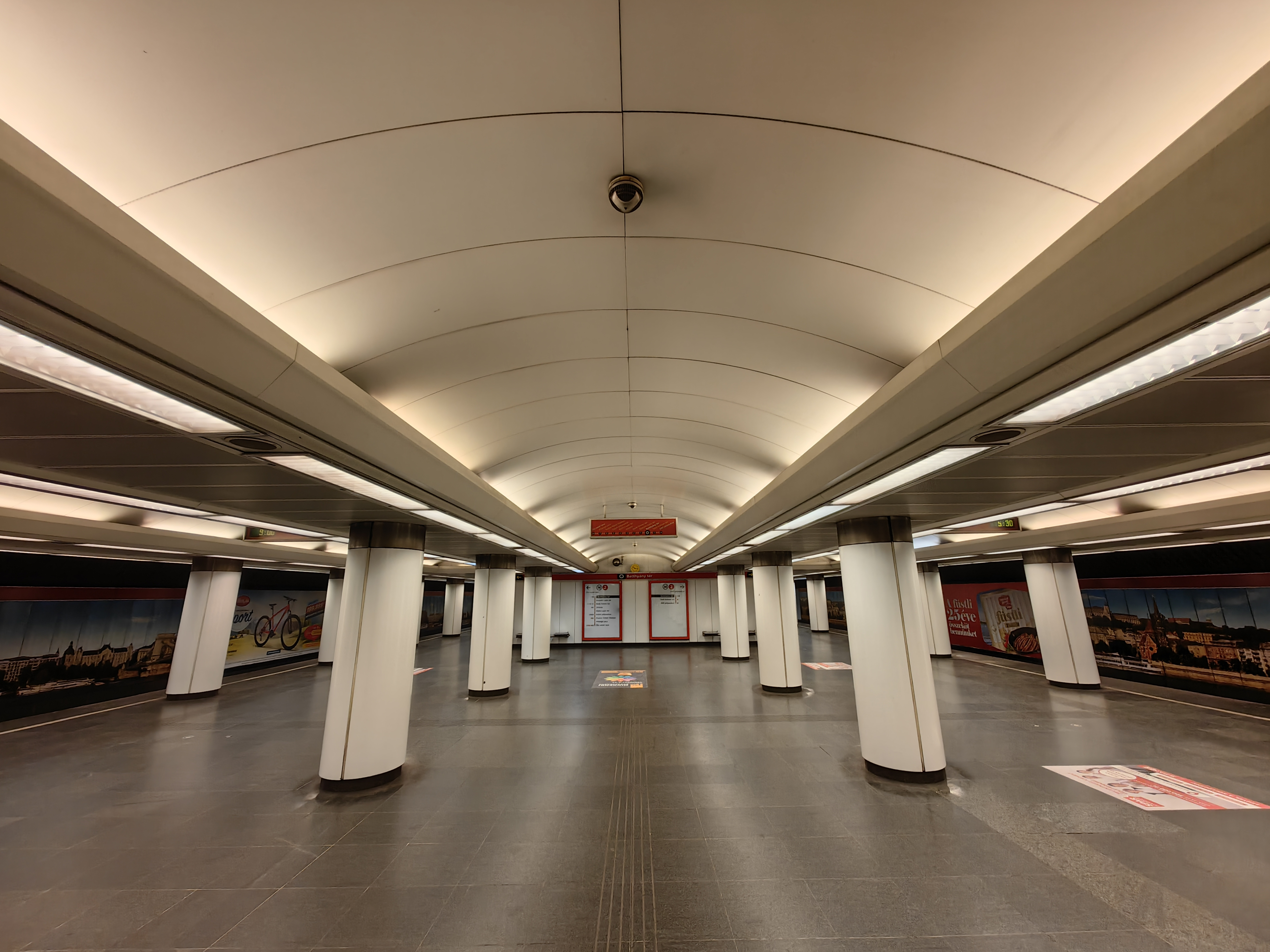

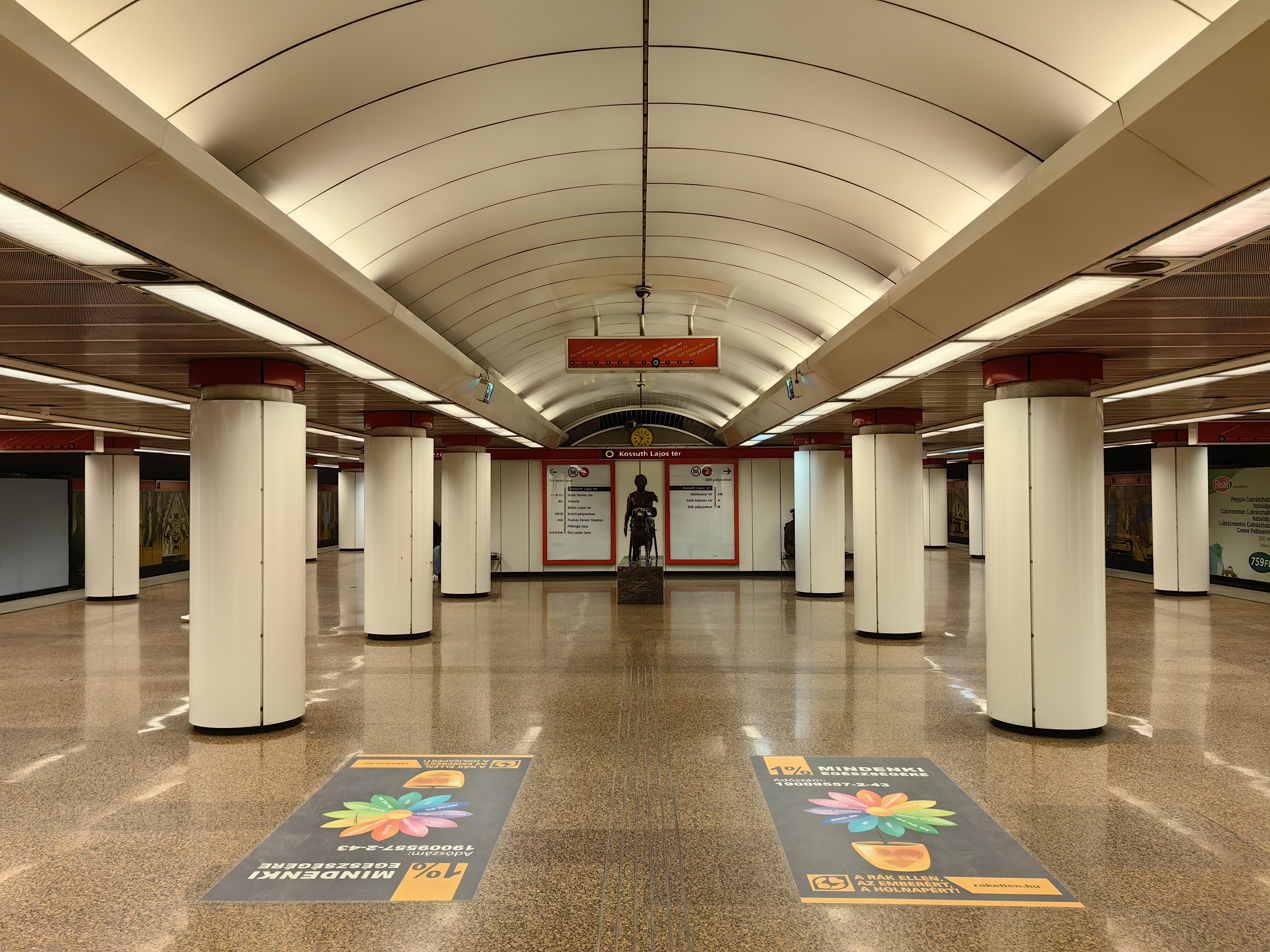

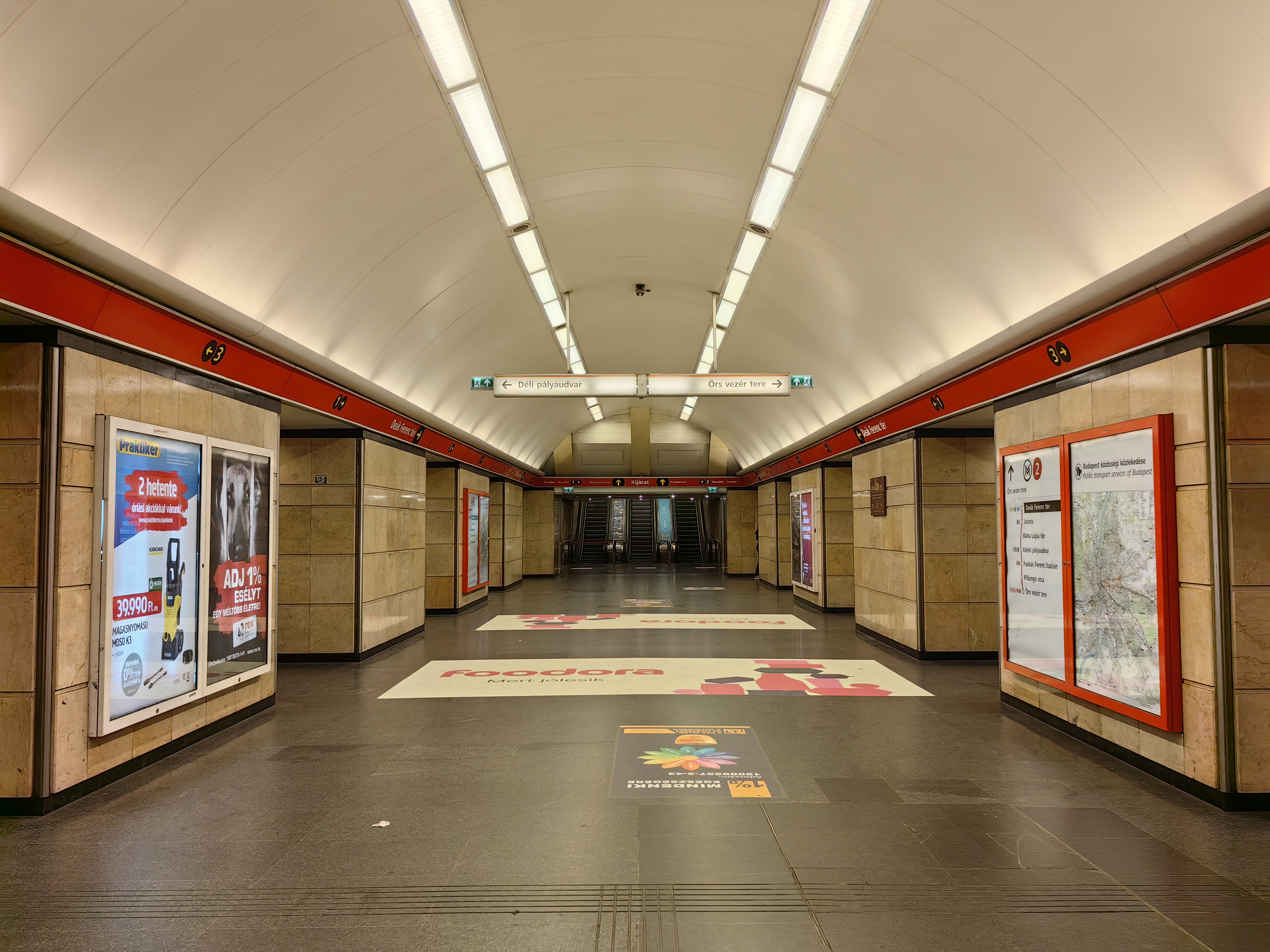

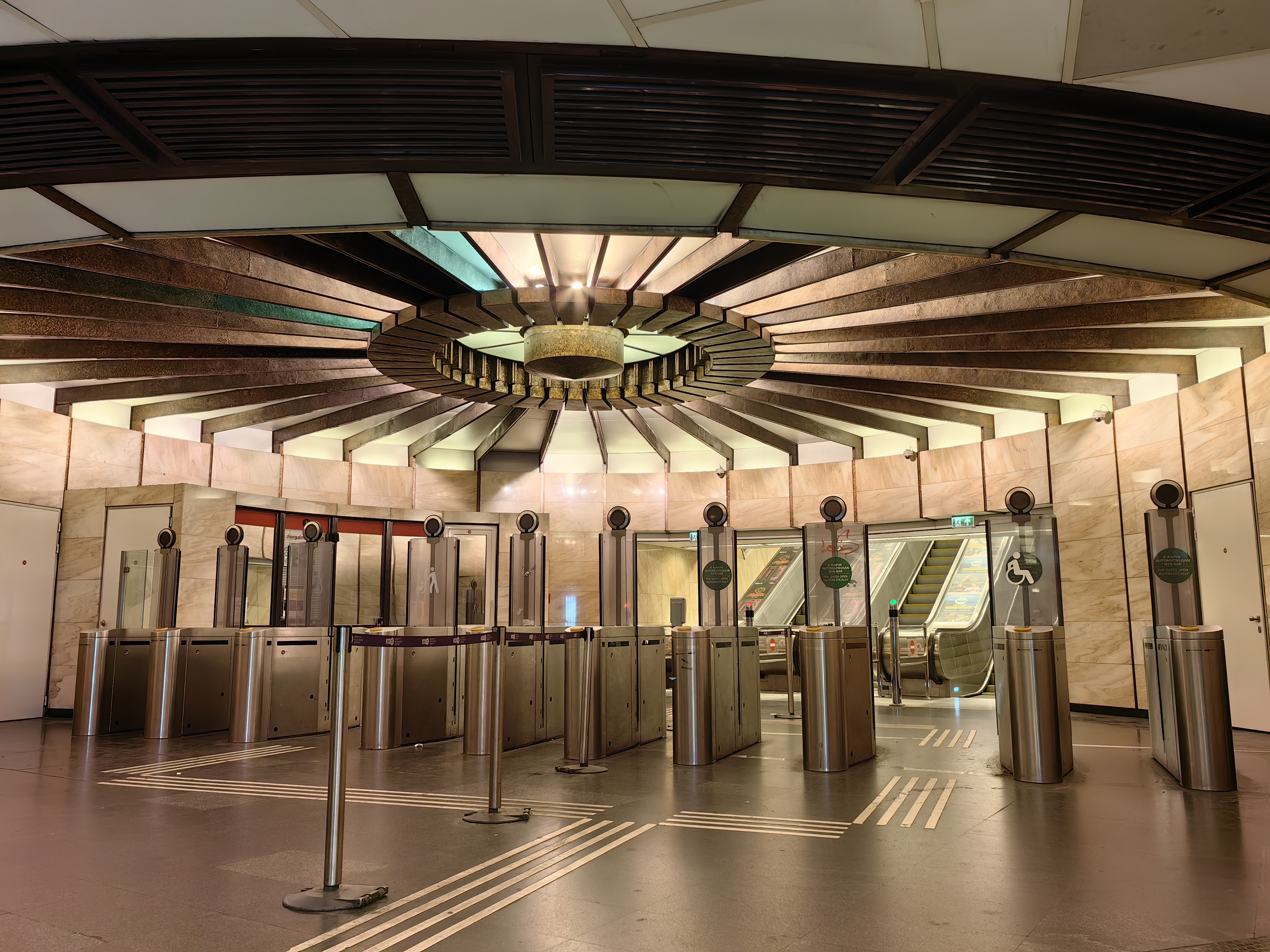

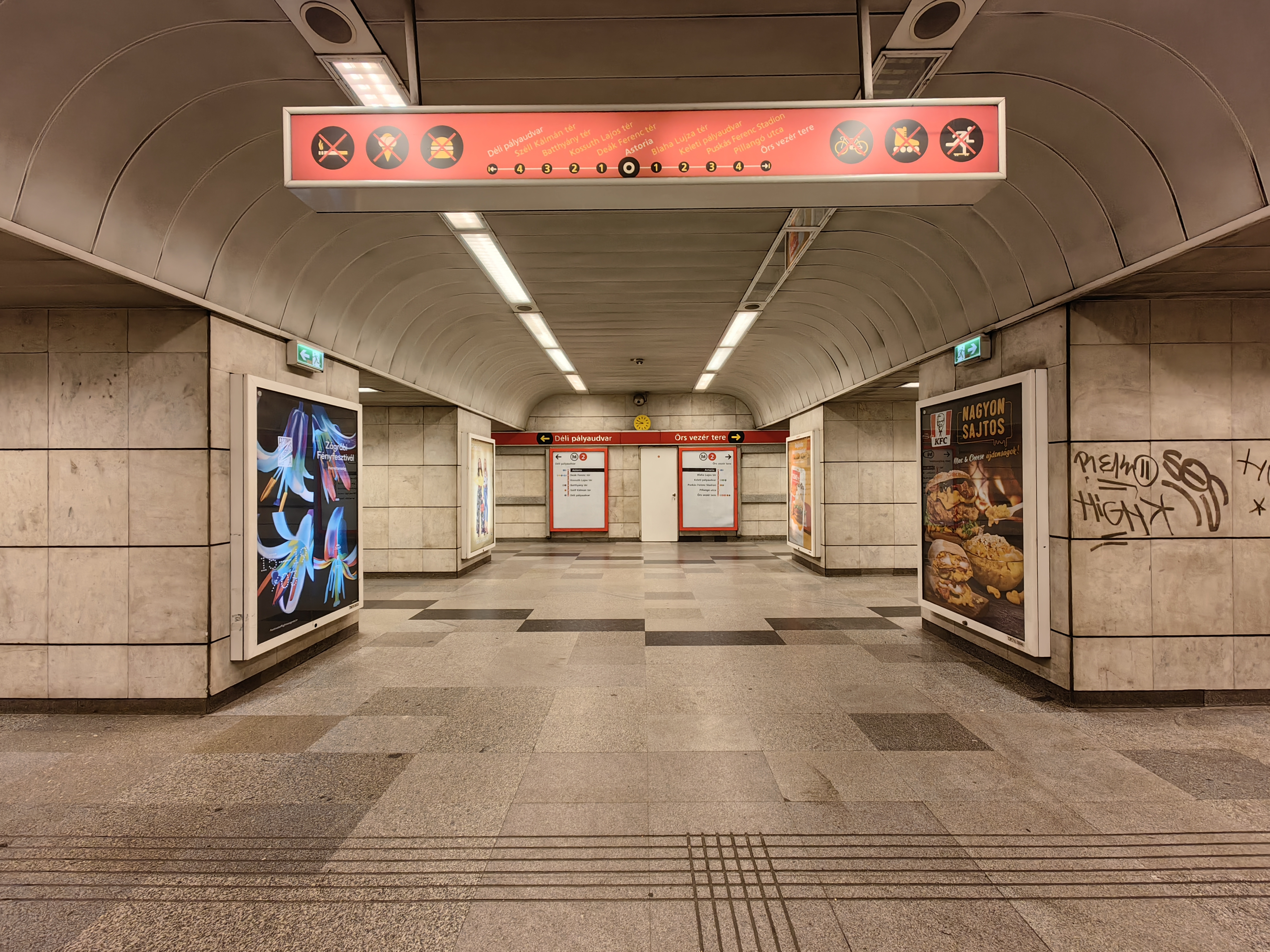

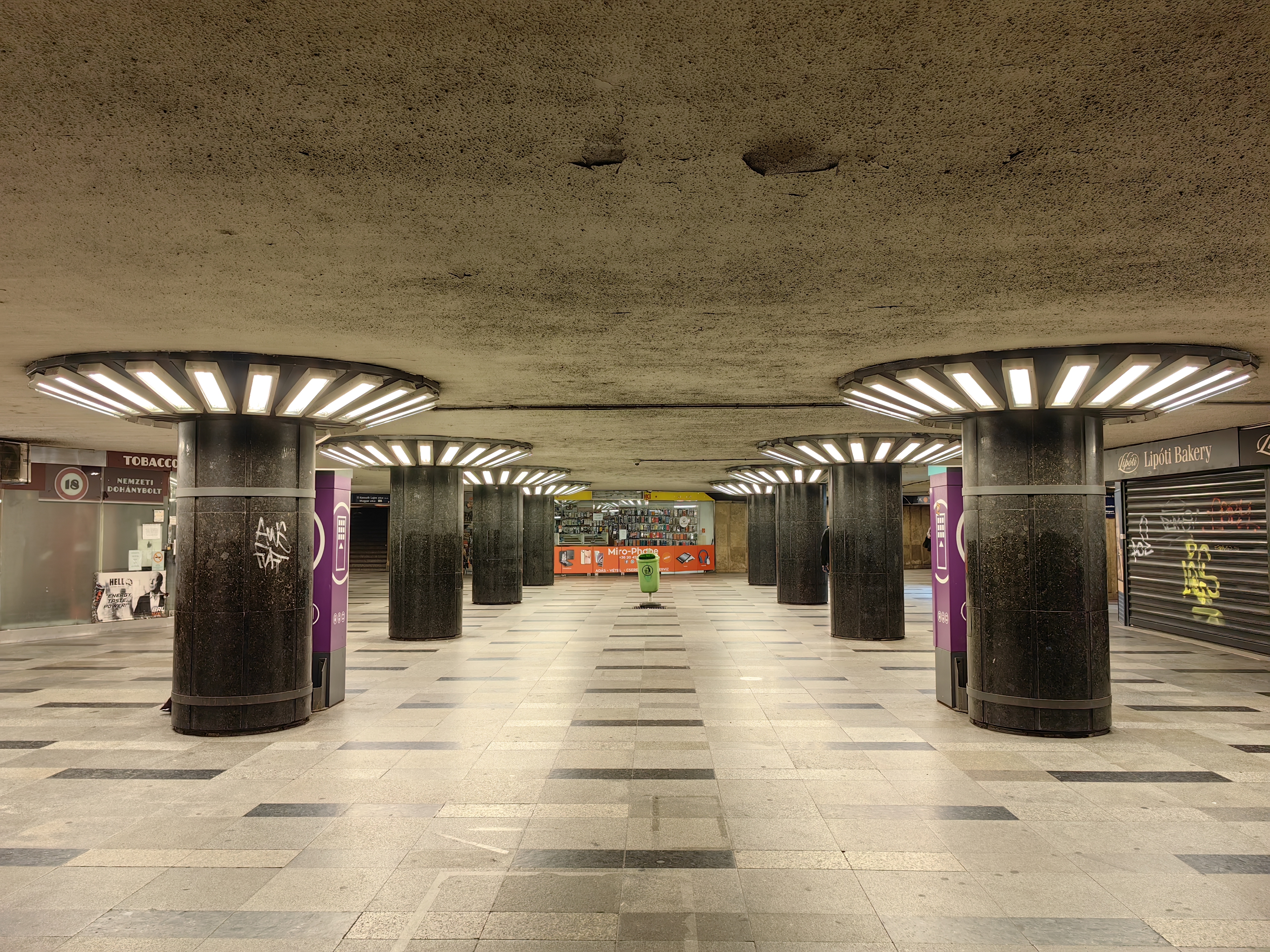

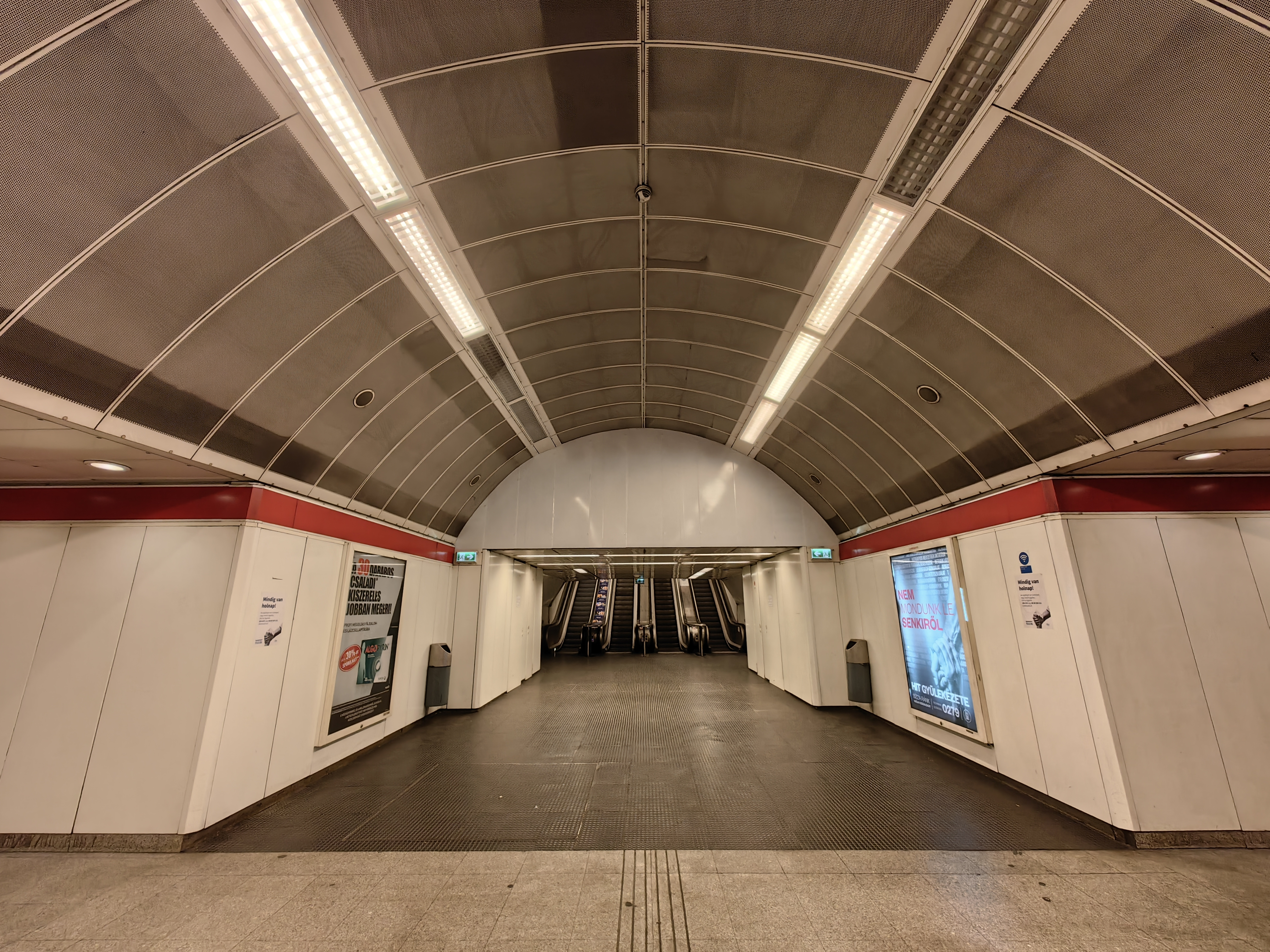

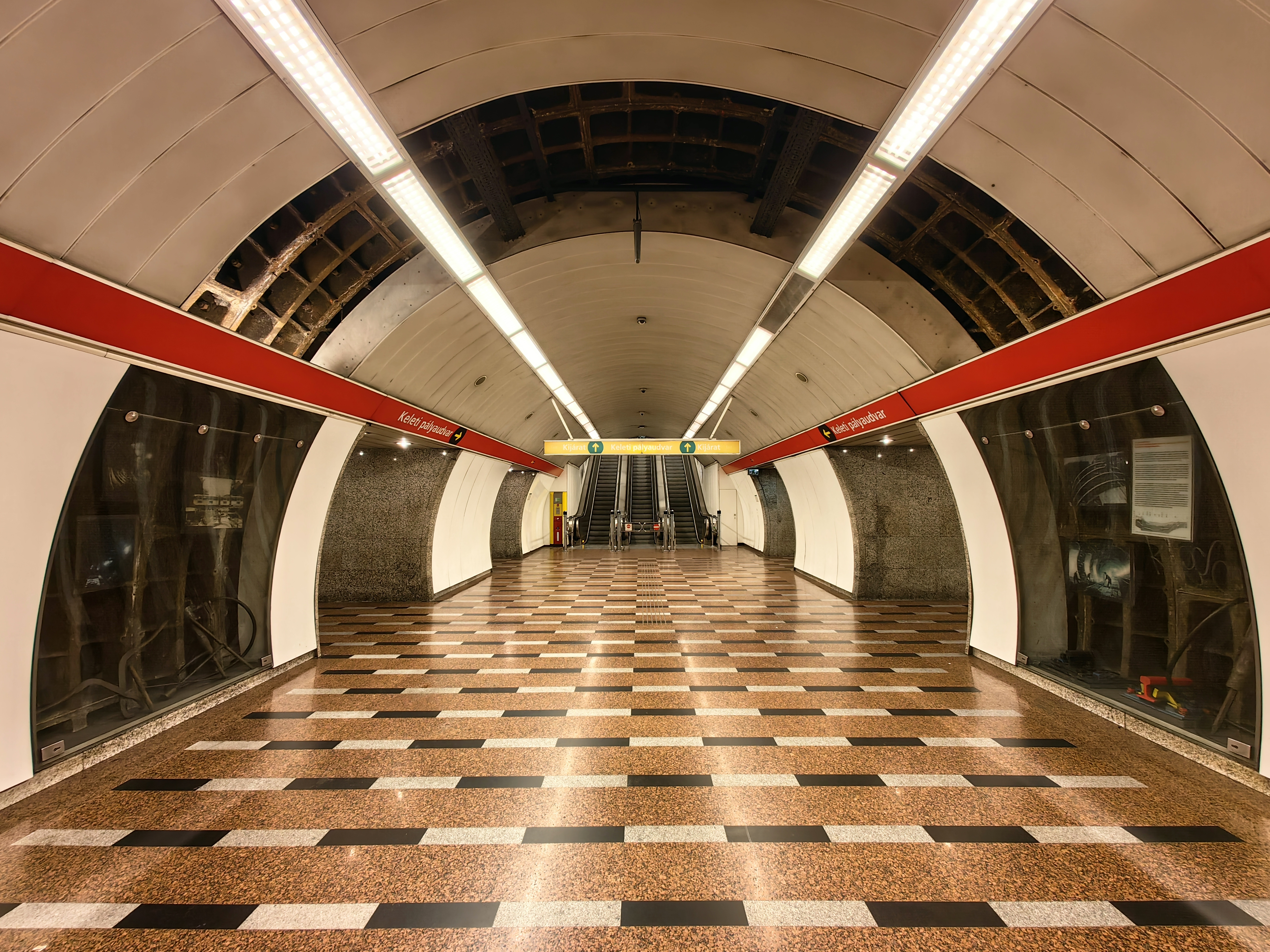

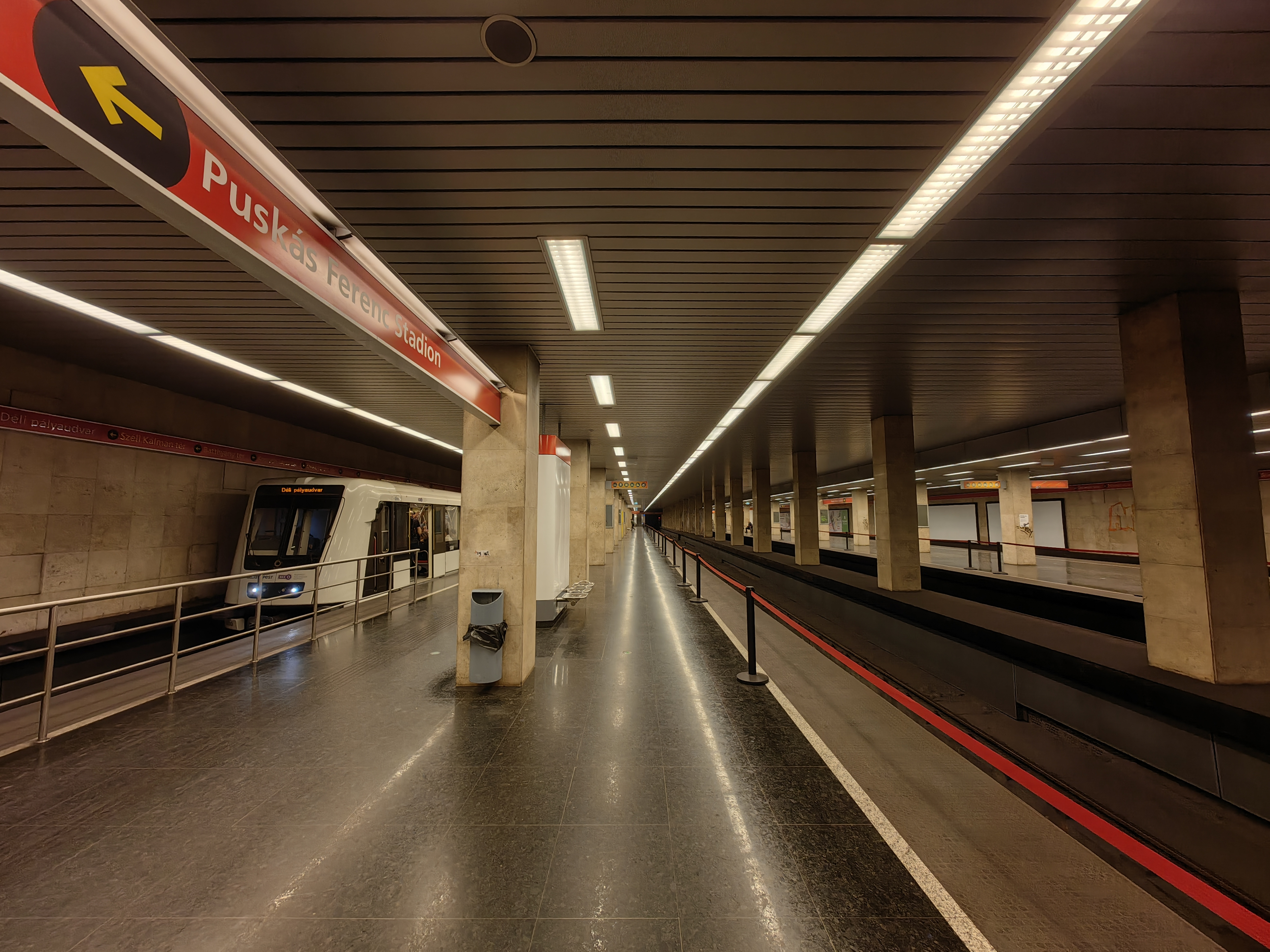

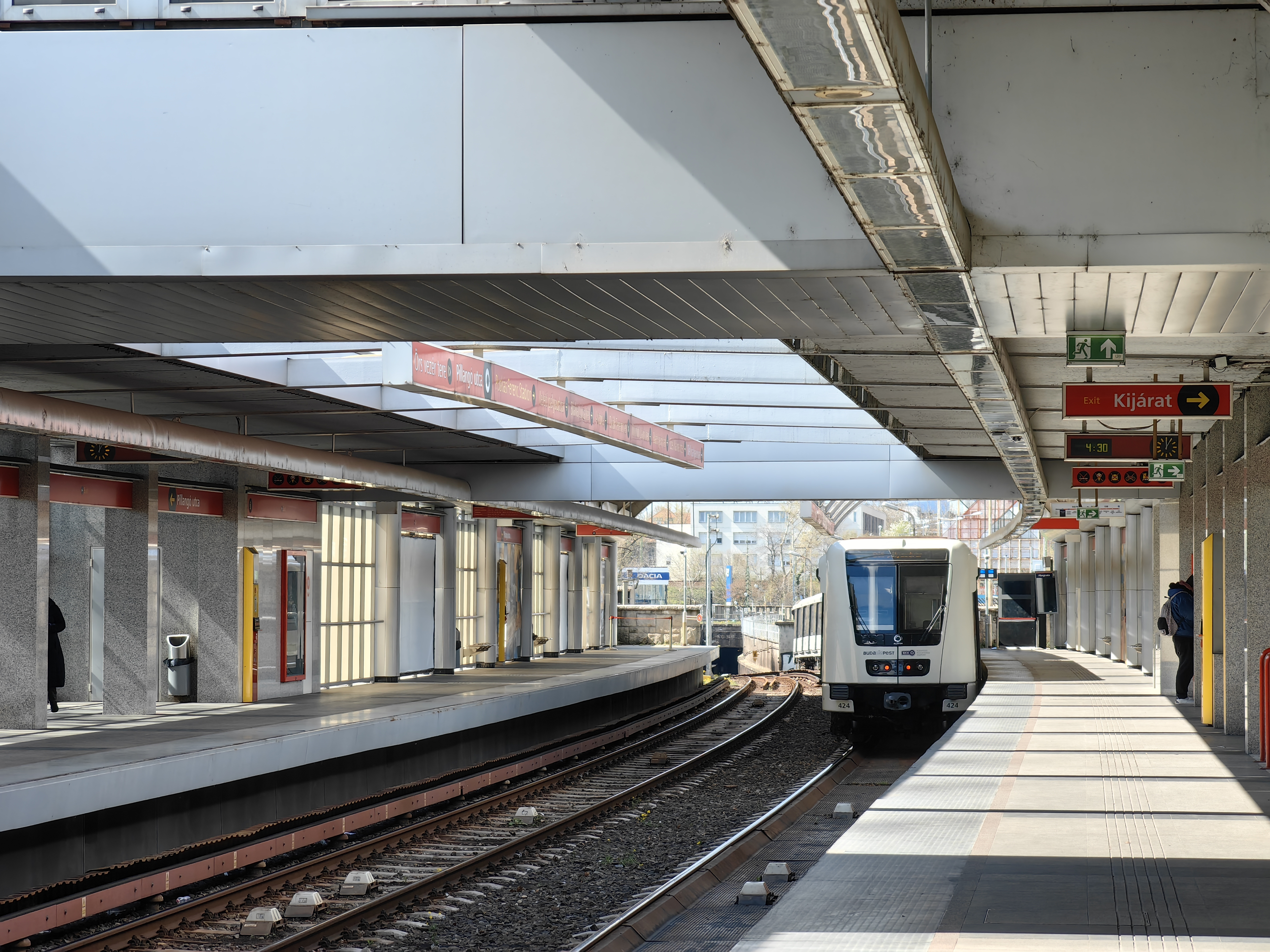

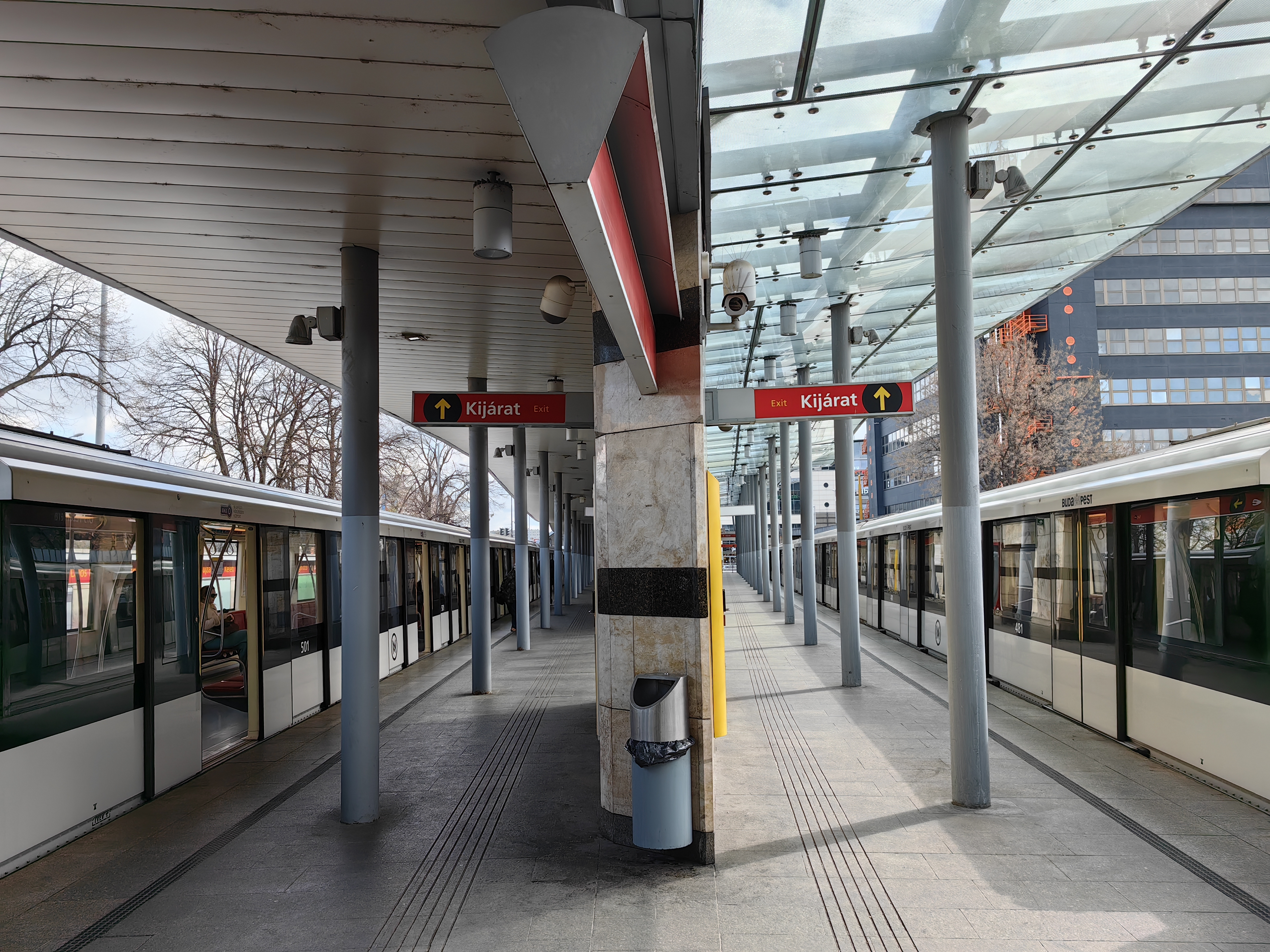
