= Pillangó utca metro station =

Budapest metro station

Pillangó utca
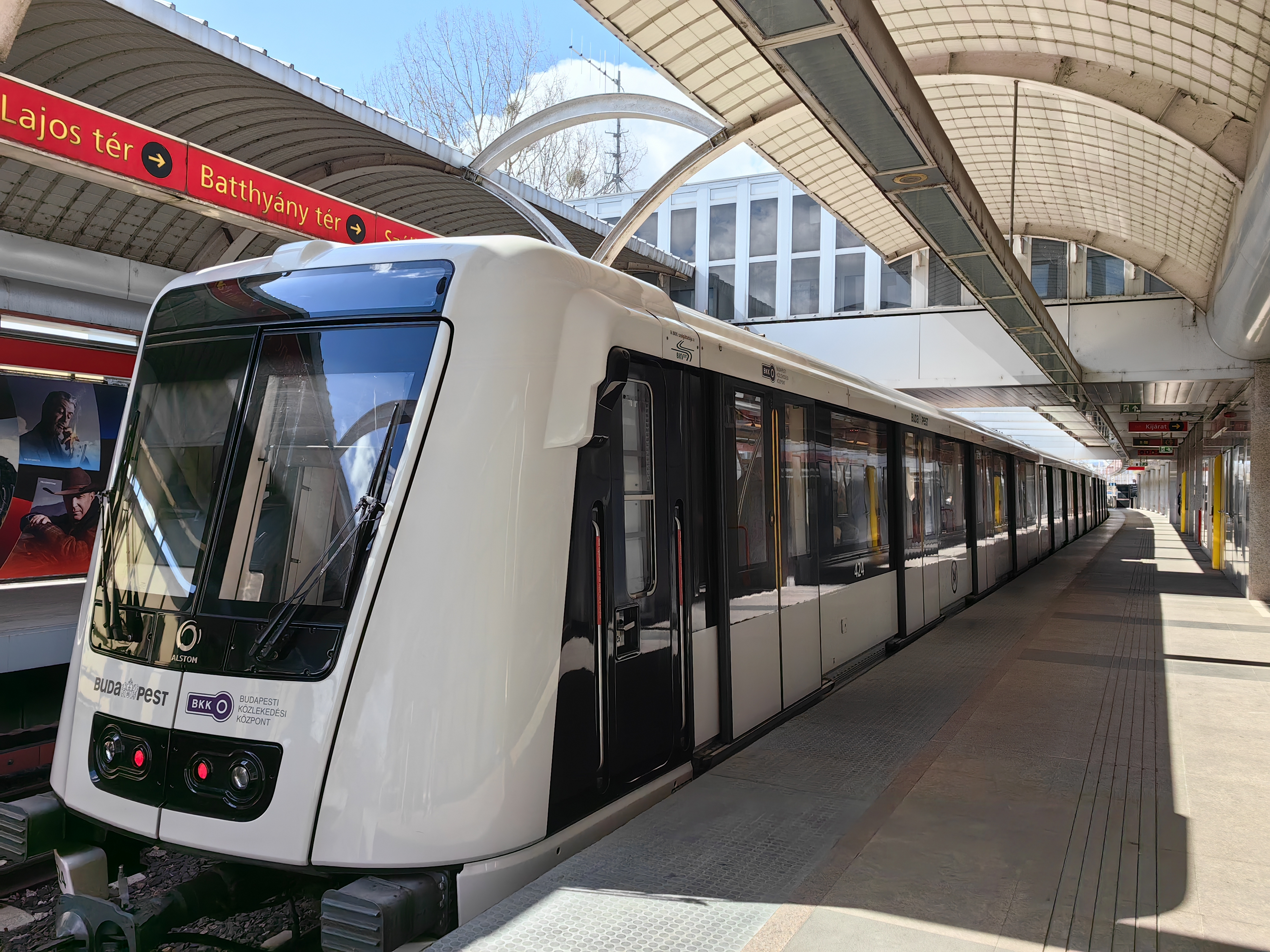

General information
- Location: Budapest; Hungary
- Coordinates: 47°30′04″N 19°07′12″E
- System: Budapest Metro station
- Platforms: 2 side platforms

Construction
- Structure type: surface

History
- Opened: 2 April 1970

Services
Preceding station	Budapest Metro	Following station
Puskás Ferenc Stadion towards Déli pályaudvar	Line 2	Örs vezér tere Terminus
Location

Pillangó utca (lit. Butterfly street) is a station of the M2 (East-West) line of the Budapest Metro. The station was opened on 2 April 1970 as part of the inaugural section of Line M2, between Deák Ferenc tér and Örs vezér tere.
