= Underground Railway Museum (Budapest) =

Underground railway museum in Budapest, Hungary

- Földalatti Vasúti Múzeum
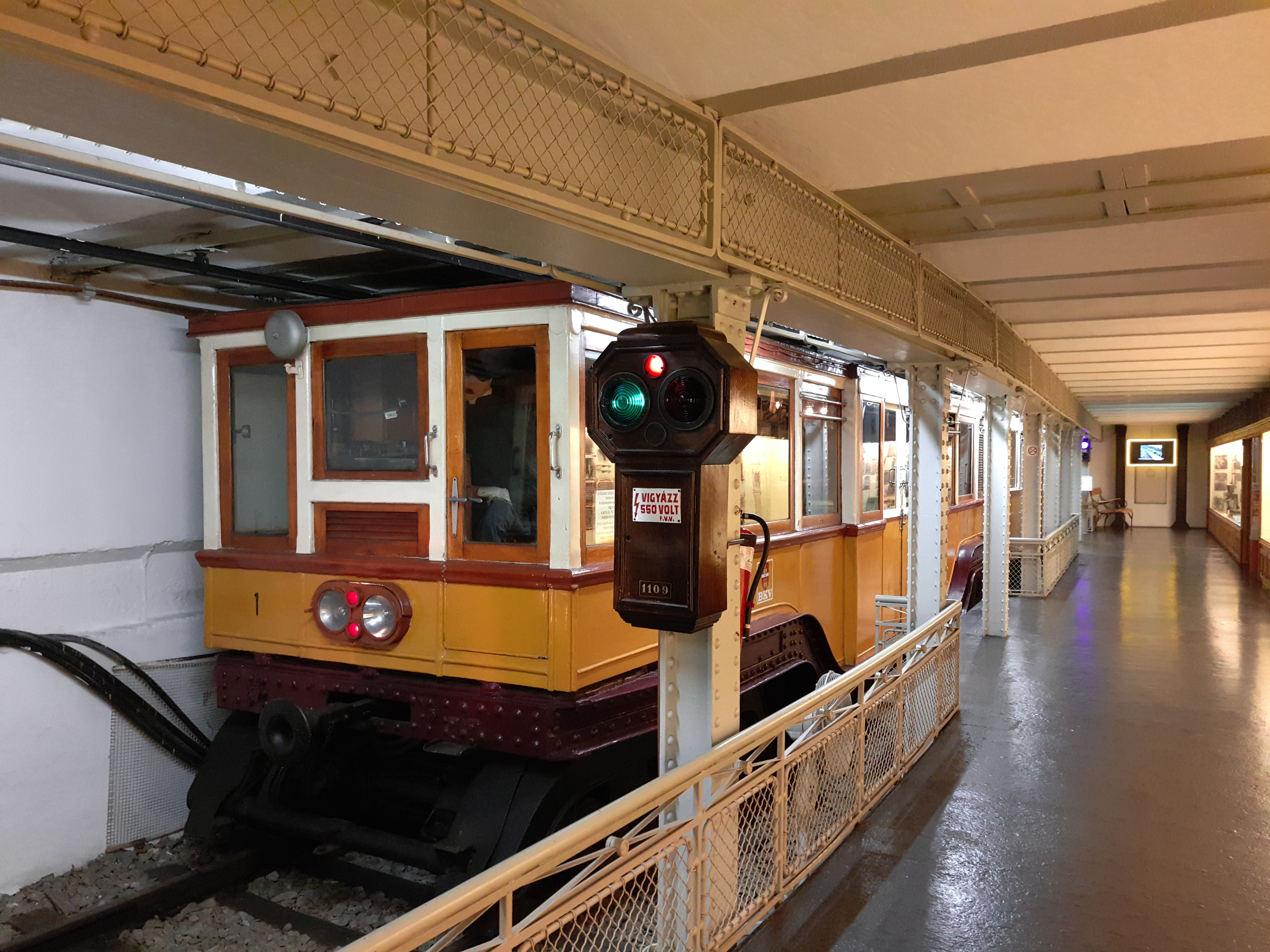
- Established: 26 October 1975
- Location: Deák Ferenc square, Budapest, Hungary
- Coordinates: 47°29′51″N 19°03′18″E
- Type: Railway museum
- Public transit access: Deák Ferenc tér metro station
- Website: www.bkv.hu/hu/muzeumok/foldalatti_vasuti_muzeum_budapest

The Underground Railway Museum (Hungarian: Földalatti Vasúti Múzeum [ˈføldɒlɒtːi ˈvɒʃuːti ˈmuːzɛum]), also known as the Millennium Underground Museum, is a museum located under Deák Ferenc square in the centre of the Hungarian capital city of Budapest. It is accessible from the pedestrian subway system that links the square to Deák Ferenc tér metro station and is housed in a tunnel that once carried the tracks of line M1 of the Budapest Metro.

== History ==
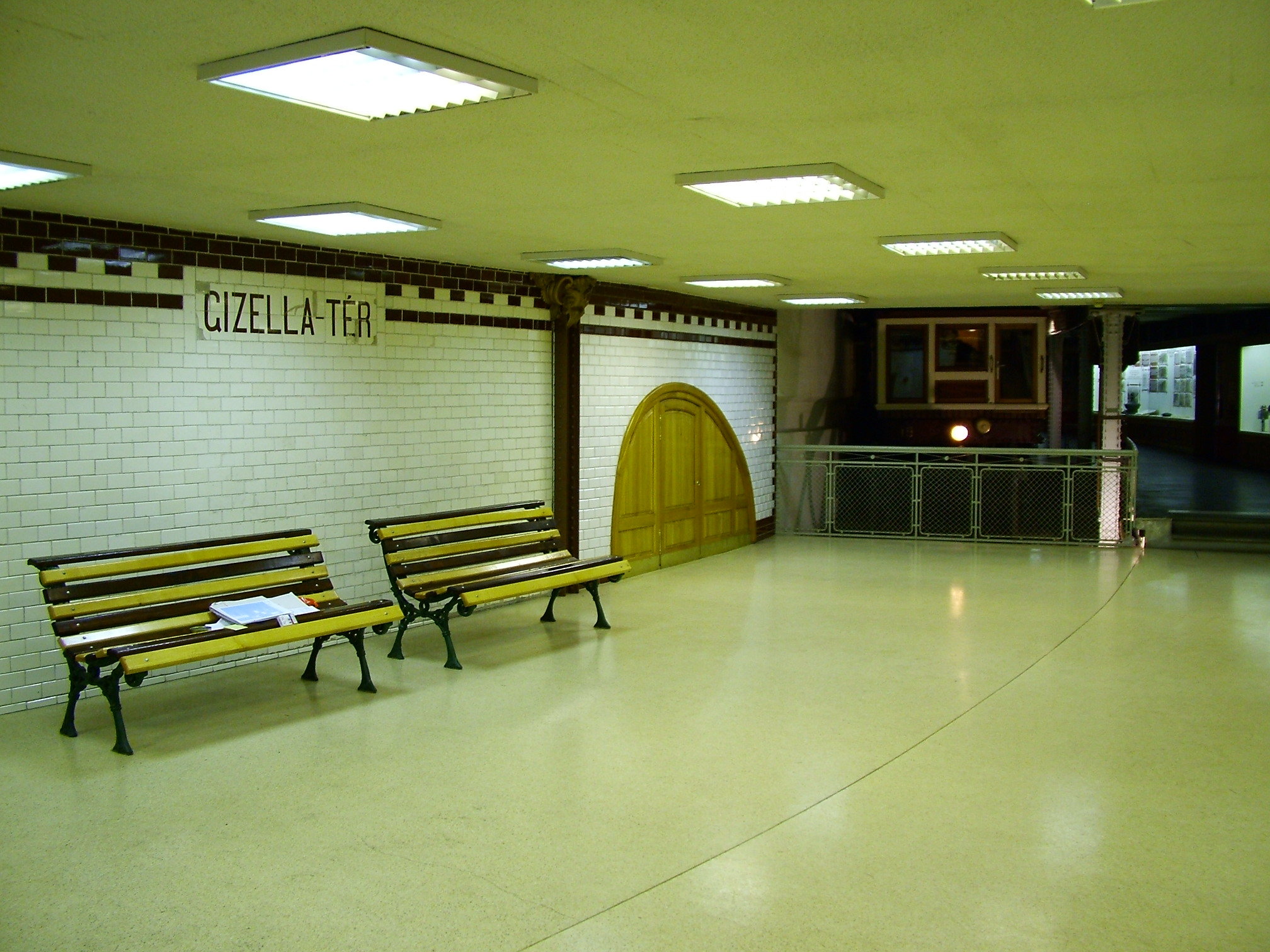
Entrance to the museum, with Gizella tér tiling

Line 1 is the oldest of the metro lines in Budapest, having been in constant operation since 1896. The initial section ran between Gizella tér station (now Vörösmarty tér station) and Aréna út station (now Hősök tere station) and served an intermediate station under Deák Ferenc square. This original station was constructed with two side platforms, at a depth of just 2.7 metres (8 ft 10 in). The approach to the station included a sharp curve disctated by the original layout of the square.

In the 1950s and in preparation for the planned line M2 of the metro, the route of the M1 line under the square was diverted in order to ease the sharp curve. This diversion left an 80 metres (260 ft) long section of the original tunnel empty and walled off. In the end, line M2 did not open until the 1970s, but in the 1960s further preparatory work led to the creation of a large-scale pedestrian underpass system under the square, which called in question the fate of the section of abandoned tunnel. At first it was planned to fill it in, but then it was suggested that a metro exhibition be organized in it.

As the eventual result of this suggestion the new museum was created in the rebuilt tunnel. The museum opened on 26 October 1975. It was renovated in 1996, the 100th anniversary of the opening of the railway.

== Collection ==
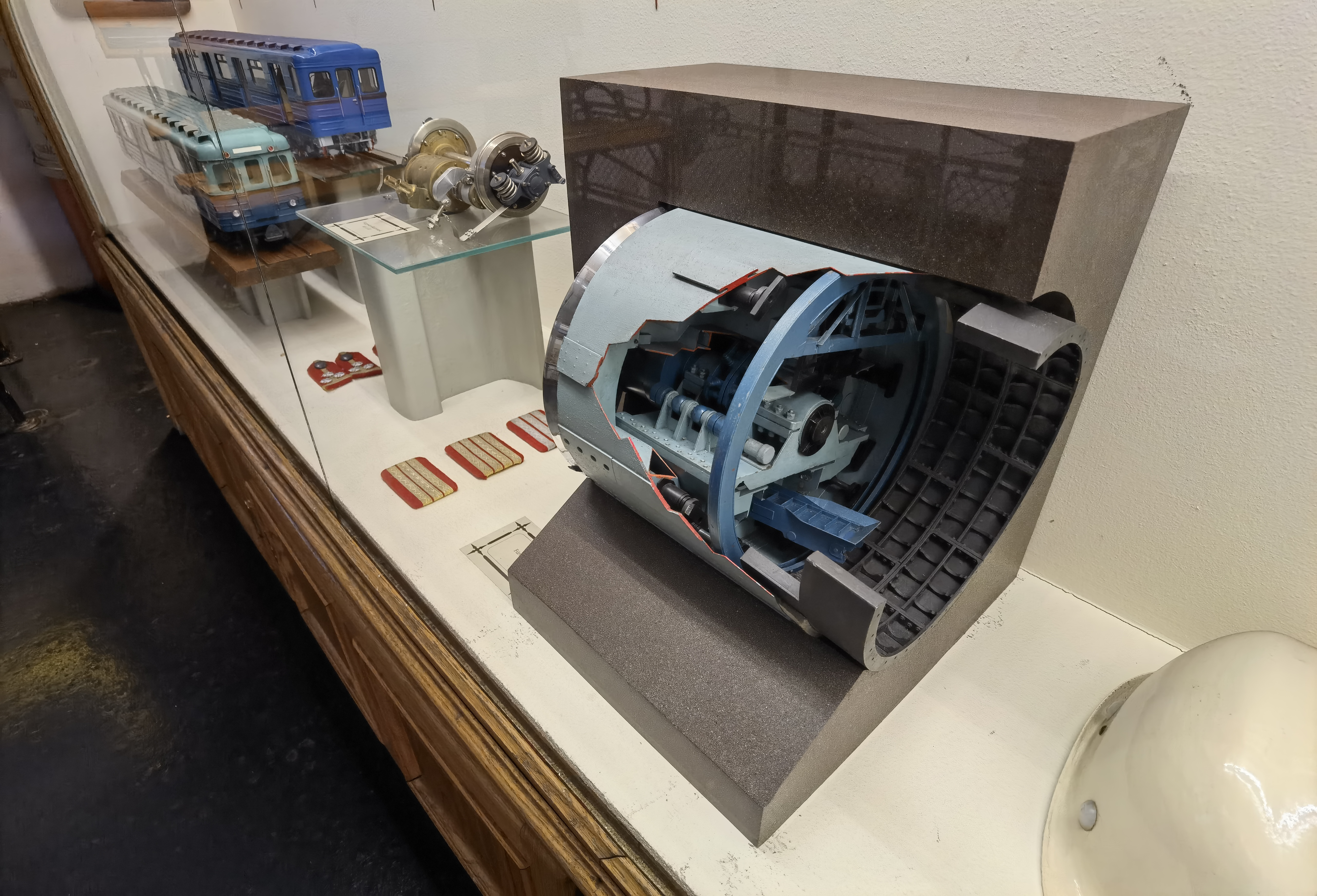
Models depicting later metro lines

=== Vehicles ===
The museum exhibits three vehicles, all from line M1 of the metro:

Number	Year	Notes	Image
1	1896	Metal-clad bogie motor car, one of a class of 10 constructed for the opening of the line in 1896. It is presented in the condition it had when withdrawn from service in 1973.	
19	1896	Wooden-clad bogie motor car, one of a class of 9 constructed for the opening of the line in 1896. It has been restored to the condition it had when it entered service.	
81	1960	Four-wheeled driving trailer, one of a class of 16 created between 1959 and 1960 in order to provide additional capacity on the line. It is presented in the condition it had when withdrawn from service in 1973.	

=== Other exhibits ===
On the other side of the platform from the vehicles there is a display of relics, documents (including plans and maps), photographs and models, which represent the history of line M1 through its life. The final part of the exhibition provides an insight into the construction of the later, and very different, metro lines.

In June 2026, the museum hosted an exhibition about the broader history of the Budapest public transport system, not just the underground.

The museum's entrance hall displays the inscription Gizella tér, executed in Zsolnay glazed tile, which comes from the original city centre terminus (now Vörösmarty tér station).
