= AM5-M2 and AM4-M4 =

Rapid transit rolling stock used on Budapest Metro

AM5-M2
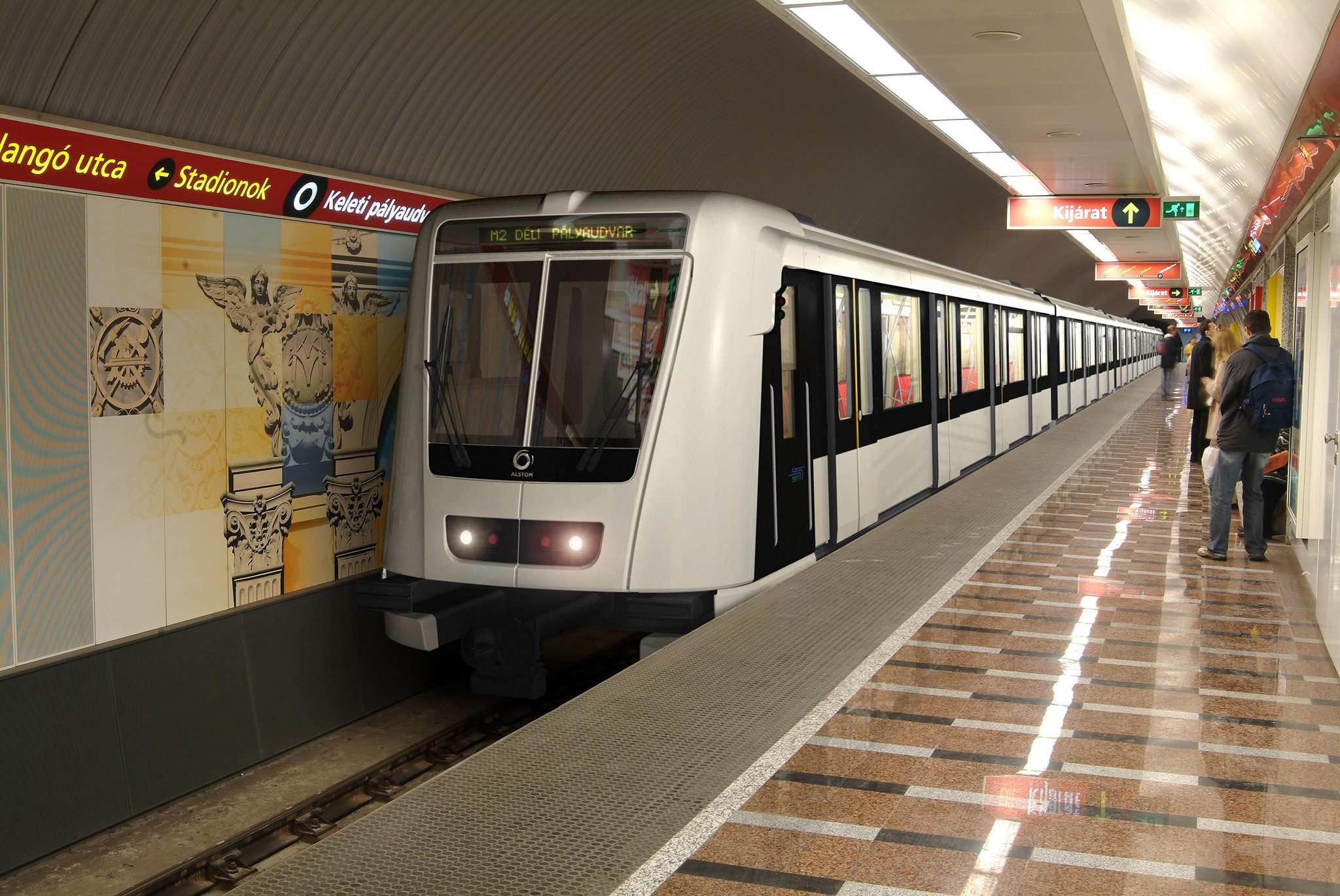
- Manufacturer: Alstom Konstal
- Built at: Chorzów, Poland
- Family name: Metropolis
- Replaced: 81–717, Ev, EvA
- Constructed: 2009–2013
- Entered service: September 7, 2012
- Number built: 22
- Formation: 5 cars per trainset: Mc-M-T-M-Mc
- Capacity: Trainset: 209 seats (Mc: 37, M: 45, T: 45)
- Operator: BKK
- Depot: Fehér út
- Line served: Line 2

Specifications
- Train length: 100.16 m (328 ft 7 1/4 in)
- Car length: Mc: 19.846 m (65 ft 1 3/8 in); M: 20.156 m (66 ft 1 1/2 in); T: 20.156 m (66 ft 1 1/2 in)
- Width: 2,780 mm (9 ft 1 1/2 in)
- Height: 3,696 mm (12 ft 1 1/2 in)
- Floor height: 1,140 mm (44 7/8 in)
- Doors: 8 double
- Wheelbase: 2 m (6 ft 7 in) (bogies)
- Maximum speed: 90 km/h (56 mph) (design); 70 km/h (43 mph) (service)
- Weight: Mc: 33 t (32 long tons; 36 short tons); M: 34 t (33 long tons; 37 short tons); T: 26 t (26 long tons; 29 short tons)
- Axle load: 14 t (13.8 long tons; 15.4 short tons)
- Traction system: Alstom ONIX 800 IGBT-VVVF
- Acceleration: 1.13 m/s^{2} (3.7 ft/s^{2})
- Deceleration: 1.9 m/s^{2} (6.2 ft/s^{2})
- Minimum turning radius: 80 m (260 ft) (depot moves); 230 m (750 ft) (operationally)
- Track gauge: 1,435 mm (4 ft 8 1/2 in) standard gauge

Notes/references

AM4-M4
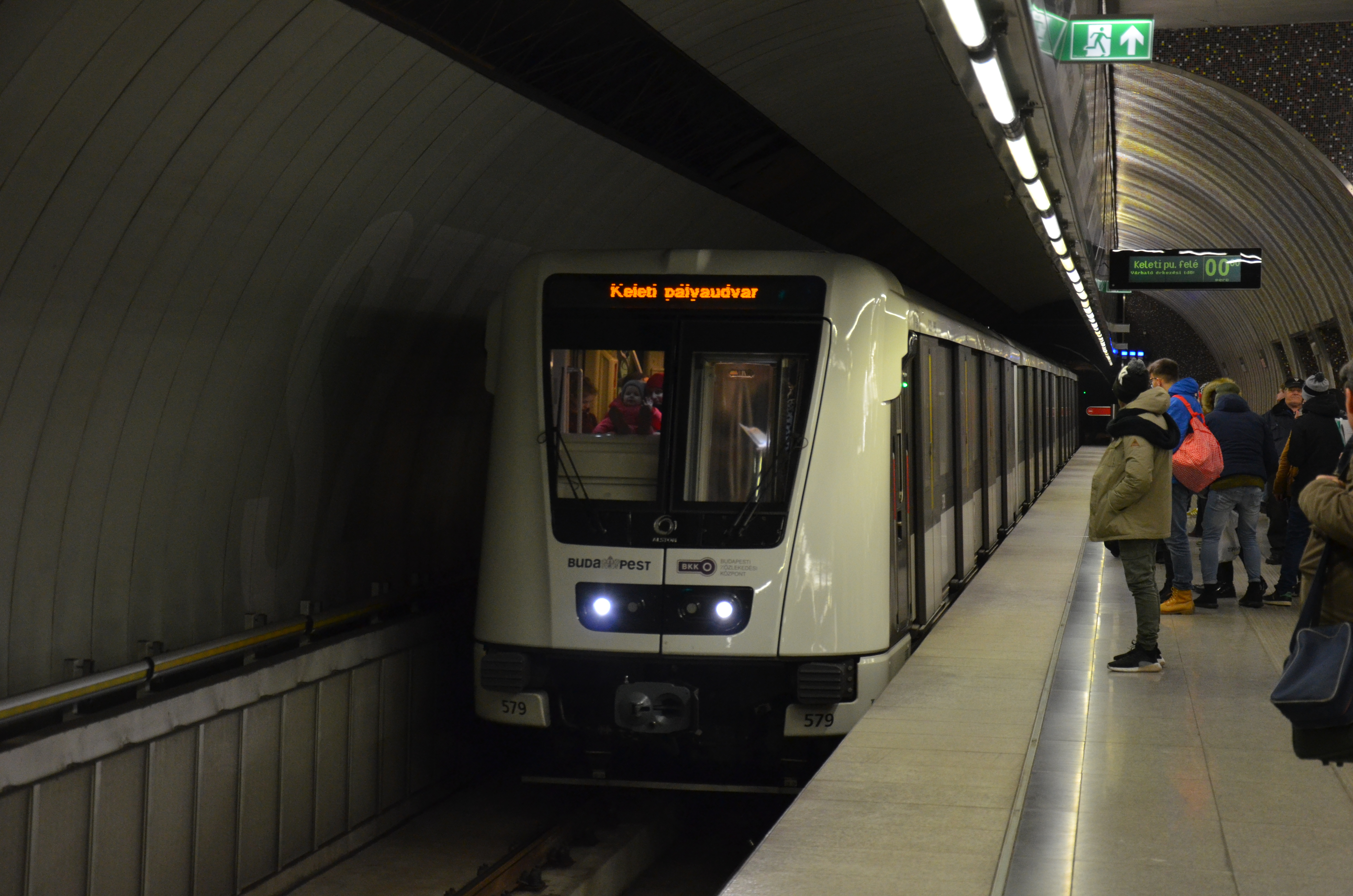
- Manufacturer: Alstom Konstal
- Family name: Metropolis
- Operator: BKV
- Depot: Kelenföld
- Line served: Line 4

Specifications
- Train length: 80 m (262 ft 5 5/8 in)
- Car length: 20 m (65 ft 7 3/8 in)

The AM5-M2 and AM4-M4 are two series of Alstom Metropolis heavy rail rolling stock that operate on lines M2 and M4 of the Budapest Metro.

Since 2009, 22 AM5-M2 sets have been constructed for use on Line M2 with delivery to be completed by 2013. A further 22 AM4-M4 sets have been constructed since 2012 for use on Line M4 with delivery due to be completed by 2014.

On December 5, 2016, an accident occurred on Metro Line M2 which involved an AM5-M2 rolling stock. An incoming train collided with a waiting train at the Pillangó utca metro station. This was the first serious accident in the history of the Budapest metro. The accident did not result in a fatality, but according to the prosecution, a total of twenty-one were injured, five of whom were classified as serious.
