= Ferenc Deák =

Ferenc Deák (Hungarian name order Deák Ferenc) may refer to:

- Ferenc Deák (footballer) (1922–1998), Hungarian footballer
- Ferenc Deák (politician) (1803–1876), Hungarian statesman
  - Deák Ferenc tér, a square in Budapest
