= Budapest bus route 97E =

Bus route in Budapest

Route 97E
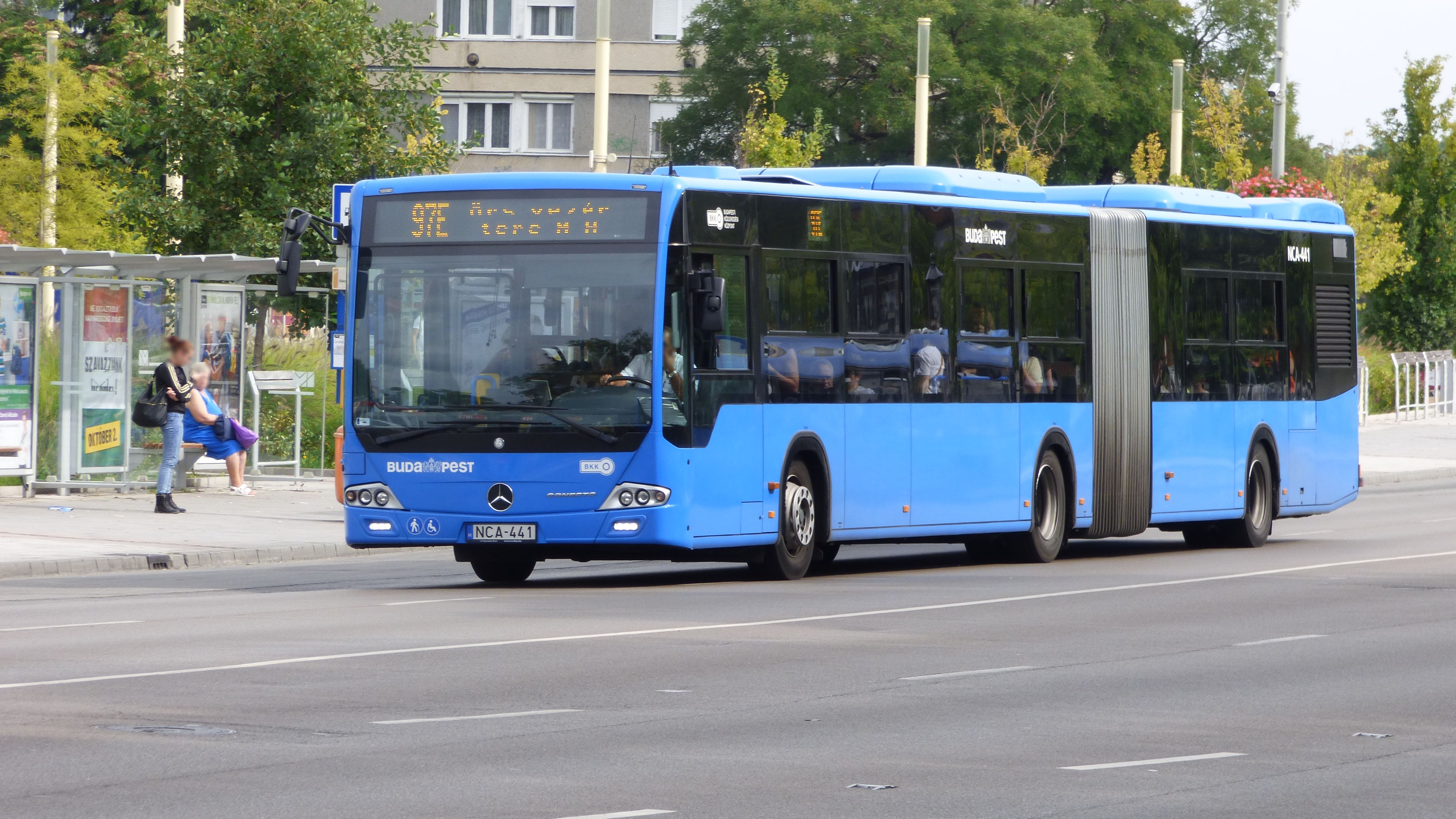

Overview
- Operator: Budapesti Közlekedési Központ and ArrivaBus
- Depot: Cinkota Bus Depot
- Vehicle: Mercedes-Benz Conecto G, Mercedes-Benz Citaro 2
- Began service: September 6, 2008

Route
- Start: Örs vezér tere metro station
- Via: Ezsébet körút
- End: Örs vezér tere metro station

Service
- Level: Daily
- Frequency: During rush hour: every 7-10 minutes, normally every 15-20 minutes
Route map

Route 97E is a bus route in Budapest. This line currently runs between Örs Vezér tere and Erzsébet körút (Erzsébet Boulevard). Between Zrínyi utca (Zrínyi Street) and Pesti Út (Pesti Road), it operates as a roundtrip service. This bus service is operated by Budapesti Közlekedési Központ and ArrivaBus.

== Route ==
Toward Erzsébet körút
Örs vezér tere terminus – Fehér út – Gyógyszergyári utca – Keresztúri út – Felüljáró – Pesti út – Rákoskeresztúr, városközpont – Pesti út – Sáránd utca – Rákoskert sugárút
Toward Örs Vezér tere
Rákoskert sugárút – Zrínyi utca – Pesti út – Rákoskeresztúr, városközpont – Pesti út – Jászberényi út – Dreher Antal út – Élessarok – Fehér út – Örs vezér tere terminus

== Stops and connections ==
97E (Örs Vezér Square M+H ► Rákoskert ► Örs Vezér Square M+H)
Travel time (↓) (minutes)	Stop name	Travel time (↑) (minutes)	Connections	Buildings / Monuments
0	Örs Vezér tere terminus	70	10, 31, 32, 44, 45, 67, 85, 85E, 131, 144, 161, 161A, 161E, 168E, 169E, 174, 176E, 231, 244, 261E, 276E, 277; 3, 62, 62A; 80, 81, 82; 907, 908, 931, 956, 990	Subway station, Suburbain railways station, Árkád and Sugár malls
14	513. utca	∫	97, 191, 161A, 161E, 162, 162A, 169E, 195, 202E, 261E, 262; 956, 968, 990	
15	Borsó utca	54	97, 191, 161A, 161E, 162, 162A, 169E, 195, 202E, 261E, 262; 956, 968, 990	
16	Kis utca	52	161, 161A, 161E, 162, 162A, 169E, 195, 198, 202E, 261E, 262; 956, 968, 990	
18	Bakancsos utca	50	46, 161, 161E, 162, 162A, 169E, 195, 202E, 261E, 262; 956, 990, 998	
20	Szent Kereszt tér	49	46, 161, 161E, 162, 162A, 169E, 195, 198, 202E, 261E, 262; 956, 990, 998	The Exaltation of the Holy Cross in Budapest Church
22	Rákoskeresztúr Városközpont	48	46, 98, 161, 161E, 162, 162A, 169E, 195, 198, 202E, 261E, 262; 956, 980, 990	
23	Mezőtárkány utca	46	161, 161E, 202E; 956	
24	Oroszvár utca	45	161, 161E, 202E; 956	
25	Sági utca	44	161, 161E, 202E; 956	
26	Tápióbicske utca	43	161, 161E, 202E; 956	
27	Kisvárda utca	42	161, 161E, 202E; 956	
28	Vecsey Ferenc utca	41	161, 161E, 202E; 956	
30	Kucorgó tér	40	161, 161E, 162, 197, 202E, 262; 956, 990	
31	Olcsva utca	∫	162, 197, 262; 990	
∫	Rózsaszál utca	38	162, 197, 262; 990	
32	Nyomdok utca	∫	162, 197, 262; 990	
∫	Schell Gyuláné tér	37	162, 197, 262; 990	
33	Nyomdász utca	∫	162, 197, 262; 990	
34	Sáránd utca	∫	162, 197, 262; 990	
35	Rákoskert sugárút	∫	162, 197, 262; 990	
36	Erzsébet körút	36	162, 197, 262; 990	
