= Örs vezér tere metro station =

Budapest metro station

Örs vezér tere
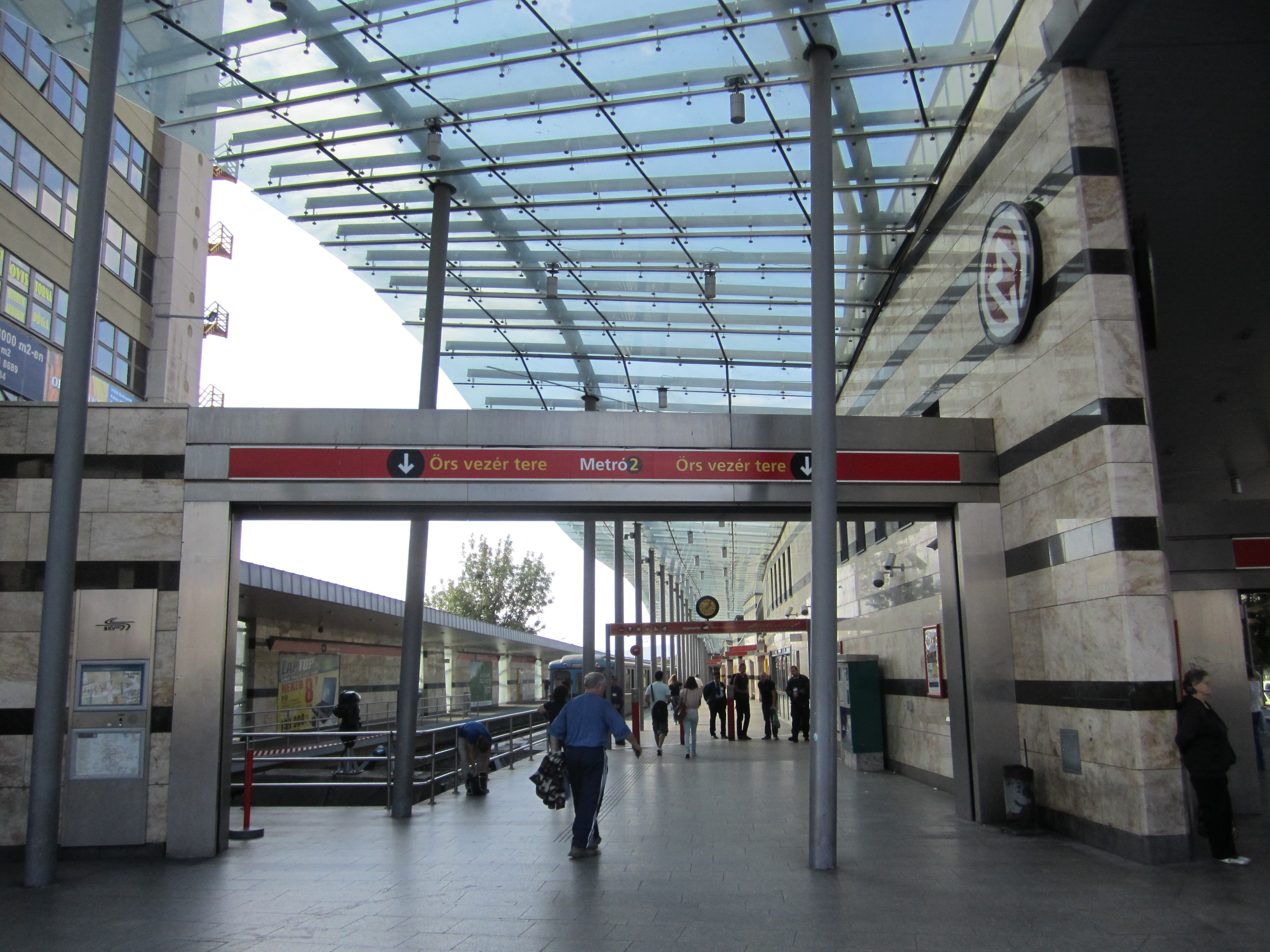
- Station interior

General information
- Location: Örs vezér tere, Budapest; Hungary
- Coordinates: 47°30′10″N 19°08′08″E
- System: Budapest Metro station
- Platforms: 1 island platform

Construction
- Structure type: surface terminus

History
- Opened: 2 April 1970

Services
Preceding station	Budapest Metro	Following station
Pillangó utca towards Déli pályaudvar	Line 2	Terminus
Location

Örs vezér tere is the eastern terminus of the M2 (East-West) line of the Budapest Metro. It is also the starting place of the suburban railway lines H8 and H9. The station was opened on 2 April 1970 as part of the inaugural section of Line M2, between Deák Ferenc tér and Örs vezér tere.

There are two shopping centers (Árkád, Sugár), an IKEA, and a tram-stop (Tram 3, 62, 62A). In addition, several bus (10, 31, 32, 44, 45, 67, 85, 85E, 97E, 131, 144, 161, 161A, 168E, 169E, 174, 176E, 231, 231B, 244, 261E, 276E, 277) and trolley bus (80, 81, 82, 82A) routes stop here. It is the largest meeting-point in East-Pest. Next to the station, there is a huge housing estate with concrete block of flats (Füredi microraion). Hungarian people usually call this station (and square) Örs.

Örs vezér tere literally means "Square of Chief Örs", Örs was an ancient Hungarian chief. Örs is also a Hungarian given name for boys, which means "man" or "hero".
