= Deák Ferenc tér metro station =

Budapest metro station

Deák Ferenc tér
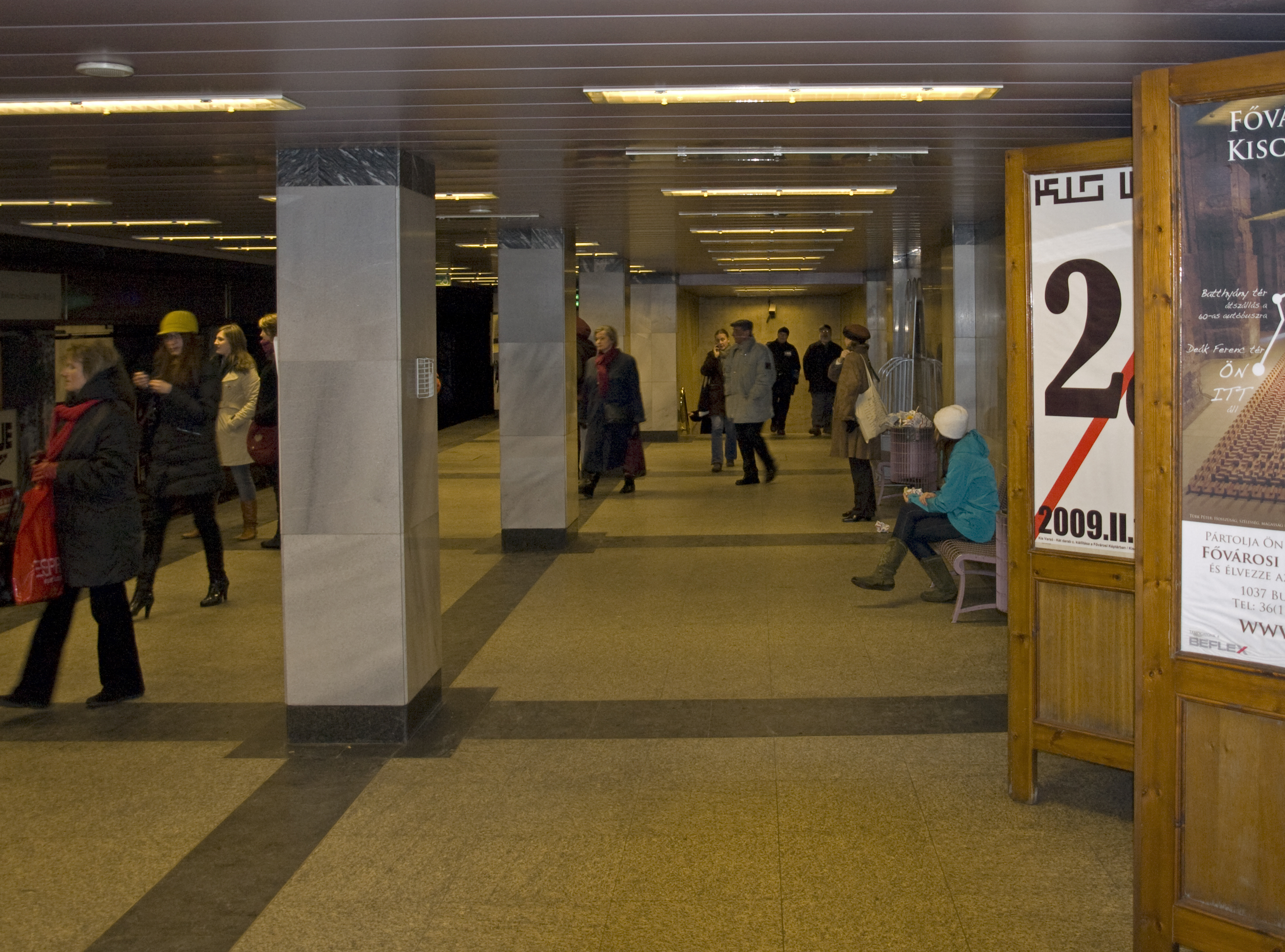
- Platforms, Line 1

General information
- Location: Deák Ferenc Square, Budapest; Hungary
- Coordinates: 47°29′51″N 19°03′18″E
- System: Budapest Metro station
- Platforms: 1 Side platform and 2 Island platforms

Construction
- Structure type: Bored underground (Line 2 and 3); Cut-and-cover underground (Line 1)
- Depth: 4 metres (13 ft) (Line 1); 28 metres (92 ft) (Line 2); 17 metres (56 ft) (Line 3)

History
- Opened: 2 May 1896 (Line 1); 2 April 1970 (Line 2); 31 December 1976 (Line 3)

Services
Preceding station	Budapest Metro	Following station
Vörösmarty tér Terminus	Line 1	Bajcsy-Zsilinszky út towards Mexikói út
Kossuth Lajos tér towards Déli pályaudvar	Line 2	Astoria towards Örs vezér tere
Ferenciek tere towards Kőbánya-Kispest	Line 3	Arany János utca towards Újpest-központ
Location

Deák Ferenc tér is a transfer station on the M1, M2, and M3 lines of the Budapest Metro. It is located under Deák Ferenc square in central Budapest, the capital city of Hungary. Owing to its direct transfer connection between three out of the four metro lines Budapest has and its downtown location, it is one of the busiest stations in the system.

The station complex provides interchange to tram, trolleybus and bus services. It also houses the city's Underground Railway Museum.

== History ==
The original station, on the M1 line, was constructed with two side platforms, at a depth of 2.7 metres (8 ft 10 in) by cut-and-cover. It was opened on 2 May 1896 as part of the inaugural section of the Budapest Metro, between Vörösmarty tér and Széchenyi fürdő.

In the 1950s and in prepararation for the planned line M2 of the metro, the route of the M1 line under the square was diverted in order to ease the sharp curve that had been dictated by the original layout of the square. The diversion left an 80 metres (260 ft) long section of the original tunnel empty and walled off, a state it was left in for some twenty years.

In the end, line M2 did not open until the 1970s. The platform tunnels for the M2 line were bored at a depth of 38 metres (125 ft) and contain an island platform serving two tracks. On 2 April 1970, the section from Deák Ferenc tér east, to Örs vezér tere was opened. On 22 December 1972, the line was extended west to Déli pályaudvar.

As part of the construction of the M2, a large-scale underpass system was created under the square, which called in question the fate of the section of M1 tunnel abandoned in the 1950s. At first it was planned to fill it in, but then it was suggested that a metro exhibition be organized in it. As a result it was rebuilt to house the Underground Railway Museum, with access from the new station concourse. The new museum opened in 1975.

In 1976, the station became the northern terminus for the first segment of metro line M3, which opened on 31 December 1976 to Nagyvárad tér. The line M3 platform has switches and a pullback track in a middle tunnel at its northern end. This track descends underground and curves more than 180° west to join the pullback track on the M2 line. This non-revenue connection tunnel was the means of supplying rolling stock to line M3 from 1976 until it was completed to Kőbánya-Kispest and the adjacent new depot in 1980. The extension of the line north, to Lehel tér was opened on 30 December 1981. The station and its interchange passage to M2 was renovated between 7 November 2020 and 23 January 2023.

Tiles in the station feature poems written in Hungarian and Portuguese.

== Connections ==
- Bus: 9, 16, 100E, 105, 178, 210, 210B, 216
- Trolleybus: 72
- Tram: 47, 48, 49

== Nearby landmarks ==
- Deák Ferenc Square
- Erzsébet (Elizabeth) Square
- Budapest City Hall
