= Déli pályaudvar metro station =

Budapest metro station

Déli pályaudvar
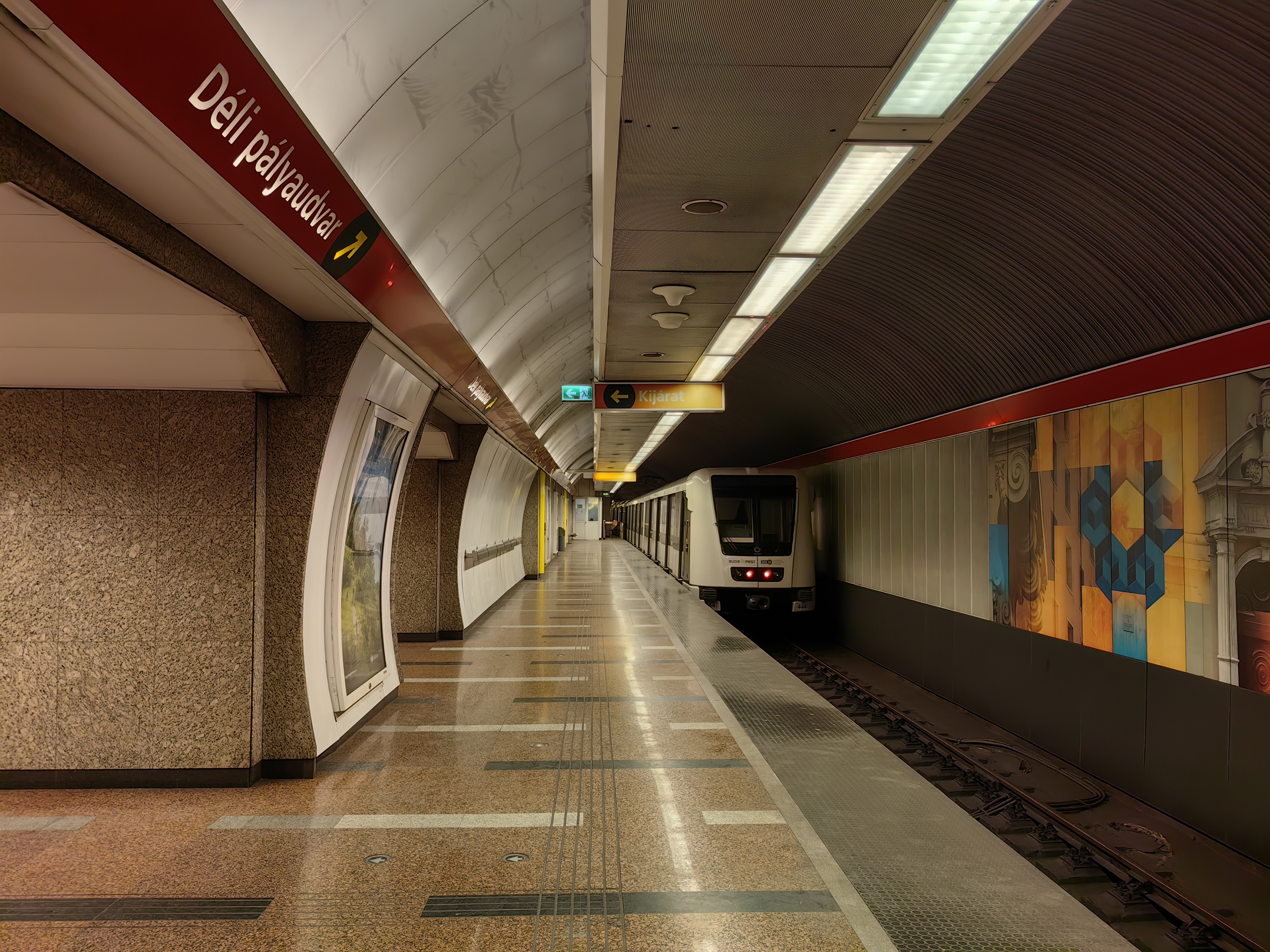

General information
- Coordinates: 47°30′01″N 19°01′29″E
- System: Budapest Metro station
- Platforms: 1 island platform
- Connections: Déli Railway Station

Construction
- Structure type: bored underground
- Depth: 25.32 meters (83.1 ft)

History
- Opened: 22 December 1972
- Rebuilt: 2006

Services
| Preceding station | Budapest Metro | Following station |
|---|---|---|
| Terminus | Line 2 | Széll Kálmán tér towards Örs vezér tere |
Location

Déli pályaudvar (Southern railway station) is the western terminus of the M2 (East-West) line of the Budapest Metro. It serves the Déli railway station and its vicinity. The station was opened on 22 December 1972 as the terminus of the extension of the line from Deák Ferenc tér.

== Connections ==
- Déli pályaudvar Hungarian State Railways (MÁV)
- Tram
  - 17 Bécsi út / Vörösvári út – Savoya Park
  - 56 Hűvösvölgy – Városház tér
  - 56A Hűvösvölgy – Móricz Zsigmond körtér
  - 59 Szent János Kórház – Márton Áron tér
  - 59A Széll Kálmán tér – Márton Áron tér
  - 59B Hűvösvölgy – Márton Áron tér
  - 61 Hűvösvölgy – Móricz Zsigmond körtér
- Bus: 21, 21A, 39, 102, 139, 140, 140A, 221
- Regional bus: 770

== Gallery ==
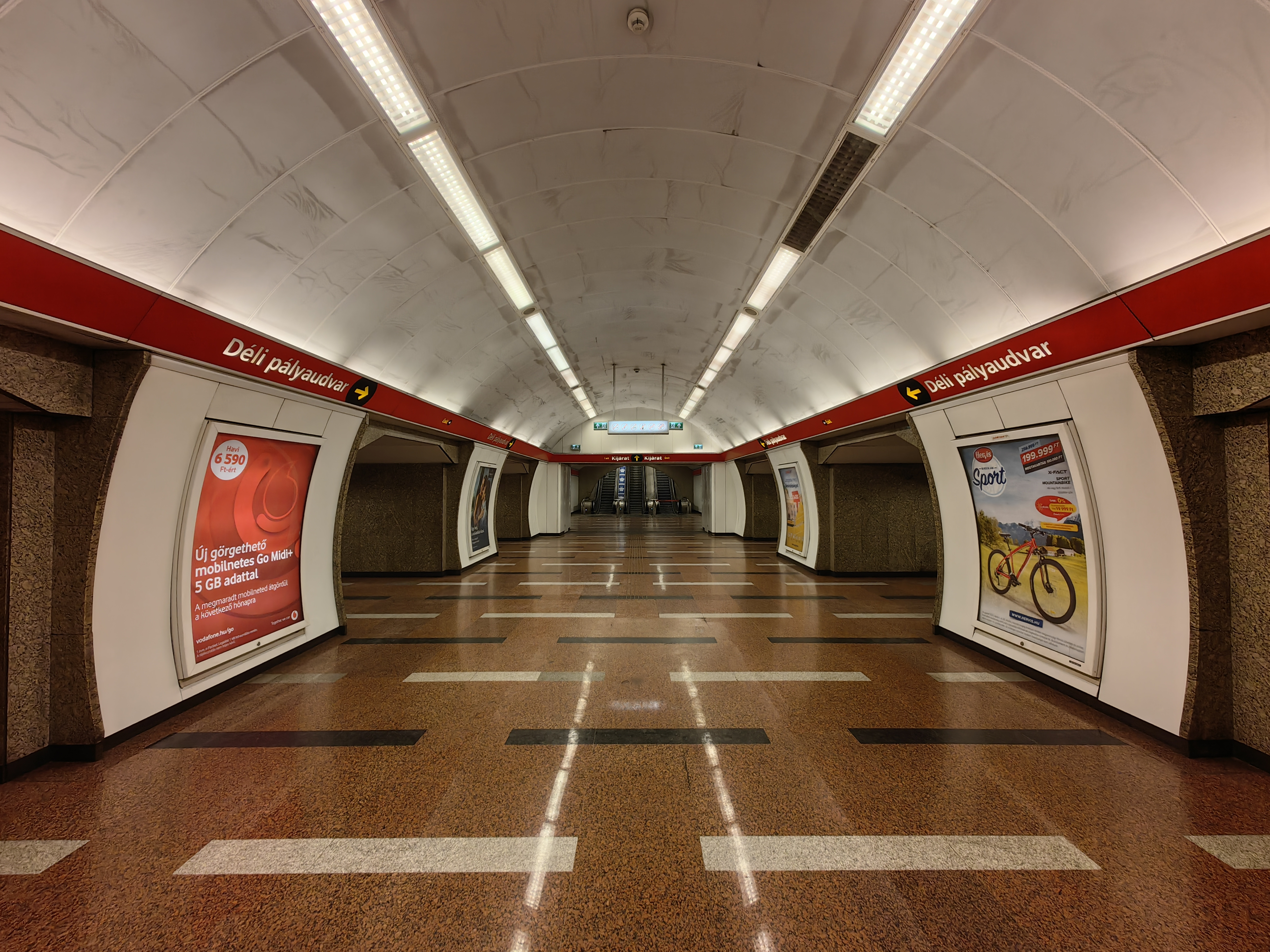

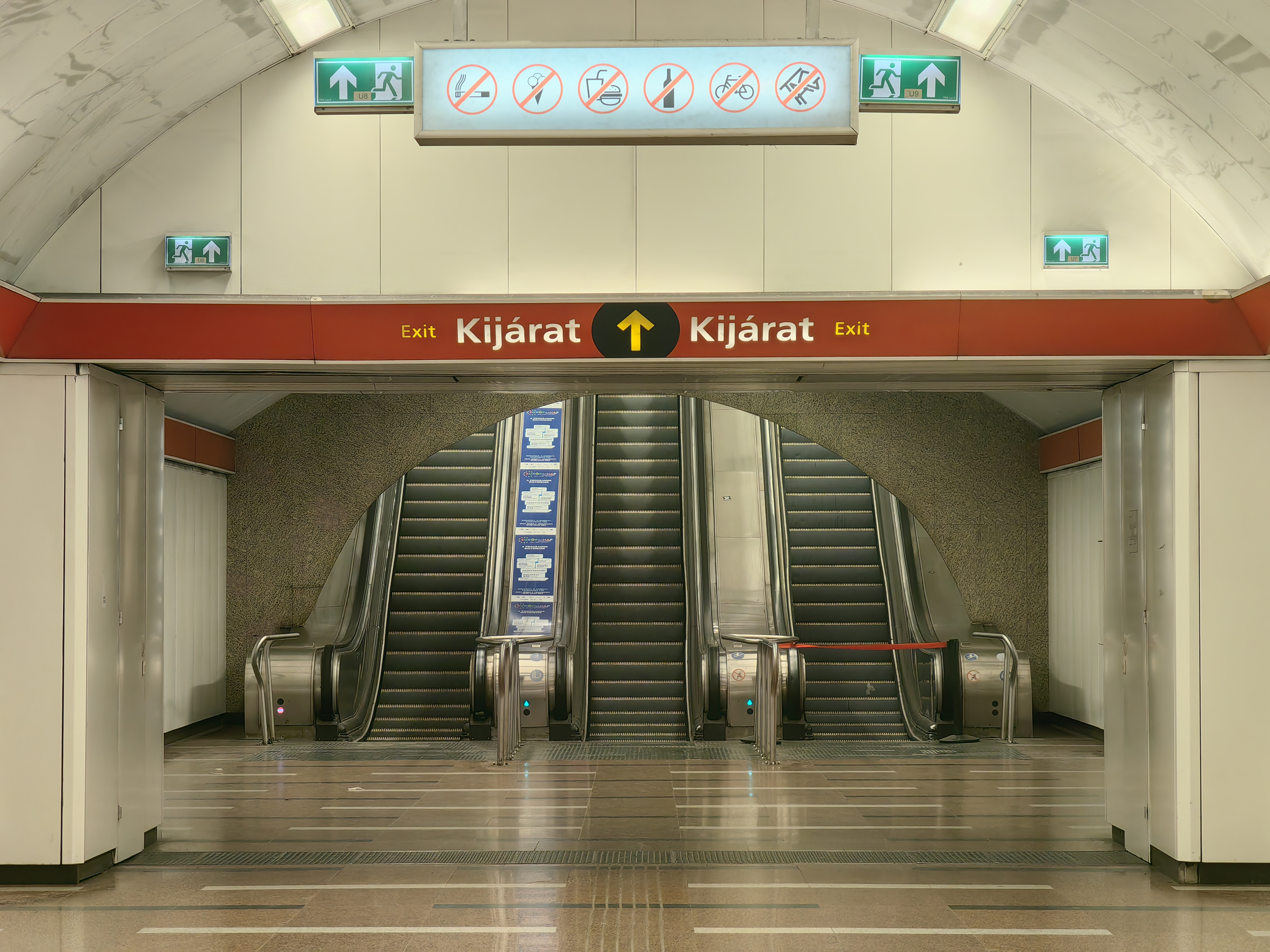

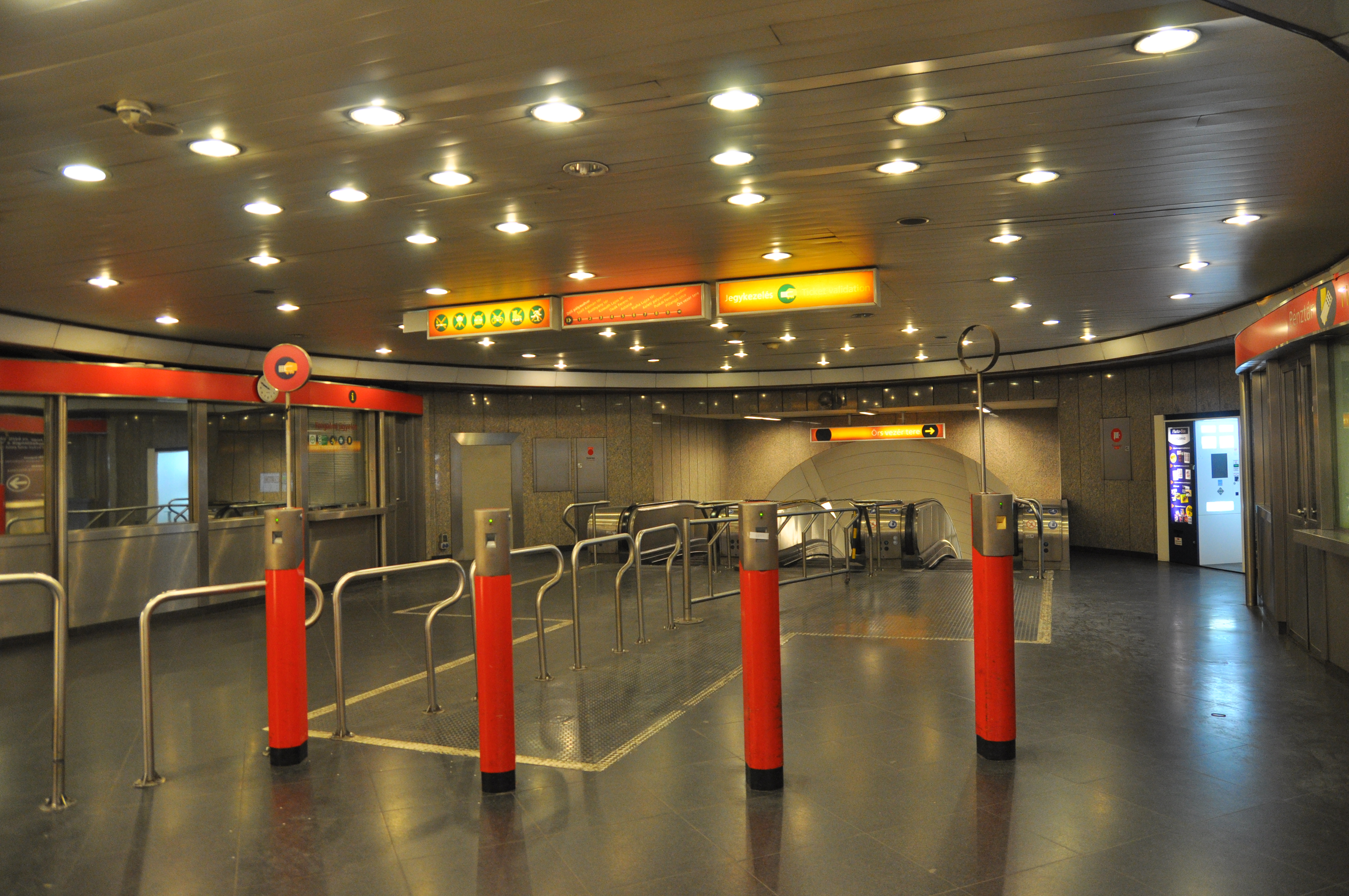
