= Deák Ferenc tér =

Square in Budapest, Hungary

Coordinates: 47°29′51″N 19°03′18″E

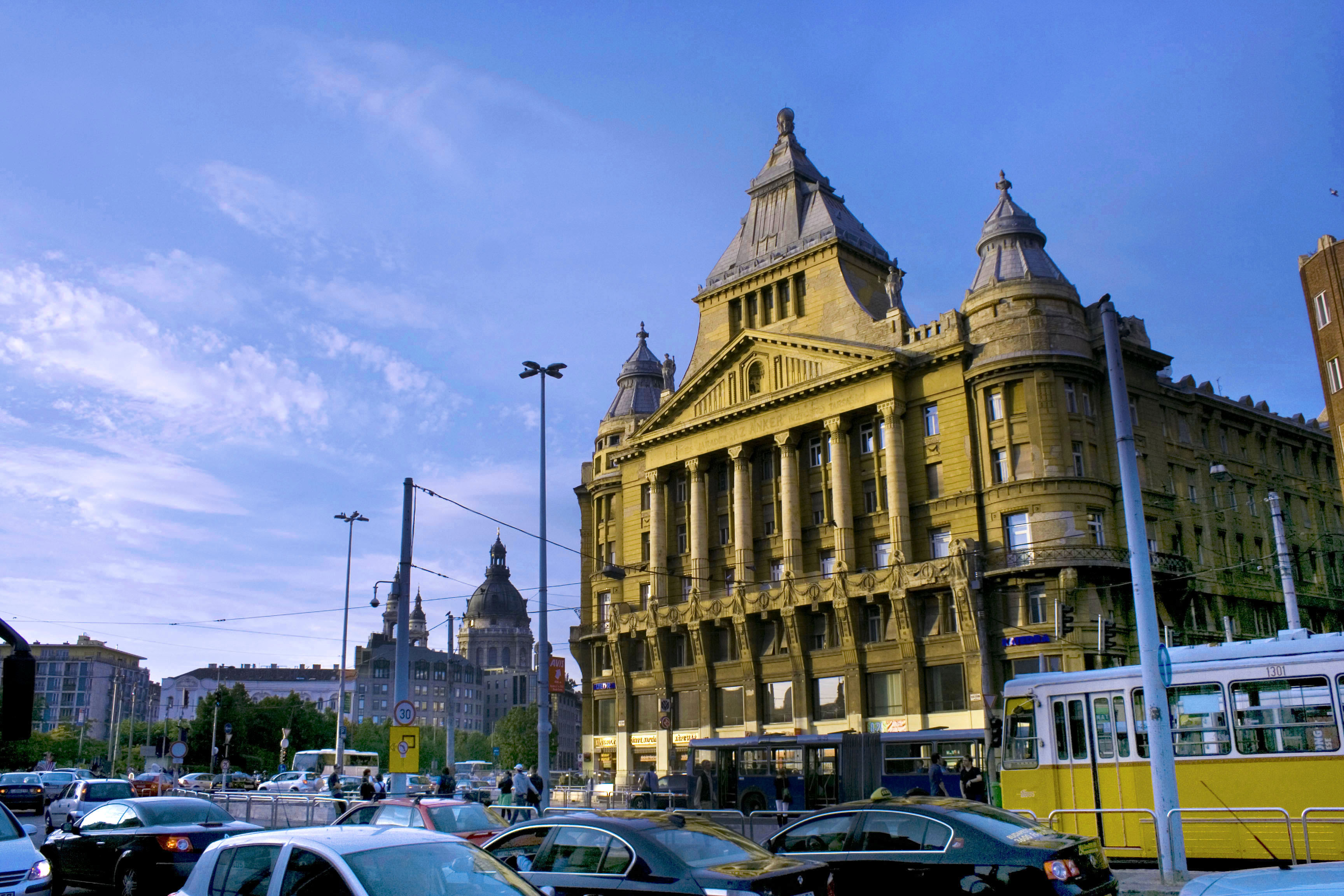
Deak Ferenc Square with the Anker Palace and the Basilica at the back

The Deák Ferenc square (Hungarian: Deák Ferenc tér, pronounced [ˈdɛaːk ˈfɛrɛnt͡s ˈteːr]), named for Ferenc Deák, is a major intersection and transport junction in Budapest. Károly körút, Bajcsy-Zsilinszky út, Király utca, Deák Ferenc utca, and Harmincad utca converge here. Three lines of the Budapest Metro each converge on the station under the square.

Tram lines 47 and 49 also originate from the square, as well as several bus lines. Deák Ferenc tér is a popular gathering spot for young people. Alcoholic beverages are sold at the grassy area, and it is common for Deák Ferenc tér to be populated until the midnight hours.

Deák Tér is mentioned in Ending Theme, a song by Swedish progressive metal band Pain of Salvation.
