= Jewish Cemetery =

Jewish Cemetery can refer to:

- Jewish cemetery, a burial place for Jewish people
- The Jewish Cemetery, a 1650s painting by Jacob van Ruisdael

== See also ==
- Jewish Cemetery (Port Gibson, Mississippi)
- Jewish Cemetery (Währing)
- Jewish cemetery of Besançon
- Jewish Cemetery of Coro
- Jewish Cemetery (Khotyn)
- Jewish cemeteries of Warsaw
- Jewish Cemetery (Roßau)
- Jewish cemetery in Chernivtsi
- Jewish Cemetery (Beirut)
- Jewish Cemetery (Worms)
- Old Jewish Cemetery (Prague)
- New Jewish Cemetery (Prague)
- Jewish Cemetery (Kleinbardorf)
- United Jewish Cemetery
- Okopowa Street Jewish Cemetery
- Willesden Jewish Cemetery
- Liberal Jewish Cemetery, Willesden
- Golders Green Jewish Cemetery
- Old Jewish cemetery, Chambersburg
- West Ham Jewish Cemetery
- Old Jewish Cemetery, Cincinnati
- Baker Street Jewish Cemeteries
- Weißensee Cemetery
- Touro Cemetery
- Golden Hill Jewish Cemetery
- Măeriște
- Remuh Cemetery
- Mount Zion Cemetery (New York City)
- Baron de Hirsch Cemetery (Halifax), in Halifax, Nova Scotia
- Baron de Hirsch Cemetery (Montreal), in Montreal, Quebec
- Baron Hirsch Cemetery, in Staten Island, New York
- Kozma Street Cemetery
- Mount Hebron Cemetery (New York City)
- Mount Sinai Memorial Park Cemetery
- Home of Peace Cemetery
- Mikveh Israel Cemetery
- Wellwood Cemetery
- Innenstadt (Frankfurt am Main)
- Pape Avenue Cemetery
- Montefiore Cemetery
- Westlawn Cemetery
- Machpelah Cemetery (Queens, New York)
- Jewish cemeteries of Vilnius
- Jewish Cemeteries in London
- Jewish cemeteries in Ostrów
- Jewish Cemetery, Marsa
