= Gyula Balog =

Hungarian human rights activist (1959–2025)

- Born: 1959; Budapest, Hungarian People's Republic
- Died: November 28, 2025 (age 65-66); Budapest, Hungary
- Resting place: New Public Cemetery, Budapest
- Occupation: Homelessness activist
- Organization: The City is For All

Gyula Balog (1959– November 28, 2025) was a Hungarian human rights activist. He was known for his advocacy of the homeless and his roles for various human rights organisations advocating for the rights of disadvantaged communities in Hungary, including The City is For All.

== Biography ==
Balong was born in 1959 into a poor family of factory workers in Kőbánya, Budapest. When he was seven, he suffered from encephalitis, which led to him being blind for ten months. As a child, he started drinking alcohol, which turned into a dependency. At the age of 16, Balog joined the Hungarian Young Communist League, the youth wing of the Hungarian Socialist Workers' Party, initially recruiting and training new members. by 1978, he was responsible for agitation and propaganda activities at a large department store in Budapest.

Balog experienced alcoholism, unstable employment and homelessness during his adolescence and young adulthood, and spent 24 years in various homeless shelters across Hungary. He became sober at the age of 35 after joining Alcoholics Anonymous. In 1994, he started working for Alcoholics Anonymous, organising new groups, holding conferences and providing literature about alcoholism.

Balog was the author, editor and distributor of Fedél Nélkül (lit. 'Without Shelter'), a magazine ran by and advocating for homeless people. The first issues focused on Balog's experiences of homelessness. He stated that the focus should not be on how people became homeless, but how to get them out of it, pointing out that he became homeless only after he became sober, and not because of his alcoholism as often assumed.

Balog was a leading figure in the foundation Első Kézből a Hajléktalanságról and The City is For Us All, two movements that advocated for marginalised communities in Hungary. He established and co-organised the City is For All's chapter in Pécs after working for its chapter in Budapest. Balog had established Első Kézből a Hajléktalanságról in 2009 when he started doing outreach work to high schools about homelessness after a teacher read his story in Fedél Nélkül. It had reached over 10, 000 students at the time of Balog's death. He also campaigned for Utcáról Lakásba Egyesület, a housing rights organisation, and Civil Kurázsi, a pro-democracy and anti-discrimination group. Utcáról Lakásba Egyesület helped Balog gain an apartment after a period of homelessness, and he subsequently worked as a mentor for them.

Balog acted in an interactive play about homelessness, and also acted as books on alcoholism and homelessness during a "living library" project. Balog frequently appeared on the media as the spokesperson of marginalised communities, particularly the homeless. For a brief period, he was an intern for the Ministry of National Resources to support writing the country's new homelessness strategy, but was dismissed after a few months after speaking out publicly against the criminalisation of homeless people; he later described the experience as being a "puppet" for the government.

Balog died on November 28, 2025. His funeral happened in December 2025 at the New Public Cemetery in Budapest. The City is For All released a statement mourning Balog's loss and stating that his memory would continue to inform their work.
