= New Public Cemetery, Budapest =

Cemetery in Hungary

Új köztemető
- Map of the Cemetery
- Interactive map of Új köztemető

Details
- Established: 1886
- Location: Budapest
- Country: Hungary
- Coordinates: 47.47289°N 19.17922°E
- Type: Public
- Size: 207 hectares (510 acres)
- No. of interments: approximately 3 million

New Public Cemetery (Hungarian: Új köztemető or Rákoskeresztúri sírkert) is the largest cemetery in Budapest and one of the largest in Europe with an area of about 2.07 km^{2} and 3 million burials since its opening in 1886. It is adjacent to the Kozma Street Cemetery; the largest Jewish cemetery in Hungary. Its main building, which was constructed in 1903, has a 26-meter-high bell tower. In addition to its rich vegetation and wide avenues, the cemetery is famous for plot 301, where the martyrs of the 1956 revolution were buried. Today, an enormous modern monument by György Jovánovics marks their graves.

== History and description ==
The New Cemetery opened on May 1, 1886. The first funeral took place on August 6, 1886, when Victoria Závoly; the widow of a laborer was buried. The cemetery was expanded five times and now covers around more than 2 km^{2}. To date, approximately 3 million people have been interred at the New Public Cemetery of Budapest.

== Plot 301 ==
Imre Nagy, the Prime Minister of Hungary and 260 others executed by the Soviets in 1958, were buried in an unmarked grave in the New Public Cemetery. Nagy was disinterred and given a state funeral in 1989.

== Notable interments ==
- Imre Nagy (1896-1958), Hungarian communist politician who was appointed Chairman of the Council of Ministers of the People's Republic of Hungary on two occasions
- Pál Maléter (1917-1958), Hungarian general executed along with Imre Nagy
- Gyula Aggházy (1850-1919), Hungarian painter and teacher
- Gyula Balog (1959-2025), Hungarian homelessness activist
- Jenő Brandi (1913-1980), Hungarian water polo player who competed in the 1936 Summer Olympics and in the 1948 Summer Olympics
- Lajos Keresztes (1900-1978), Hungarian wrestler and Olympic champion in Greco-Roman wrestling
- István Kozma (1939-1970), Hungarian wrestler, Olympic champion and world champion in Greco-Roman wrestling
- Béla Goldoványi (1925-1972), Hungarian athlete
- Márton Bukovi (1903-1985), Hungarian association football player and manager
- Gábor Bódy (1946-1985), Hungarian film director, screenwriter, theoretic

== Gallery ==
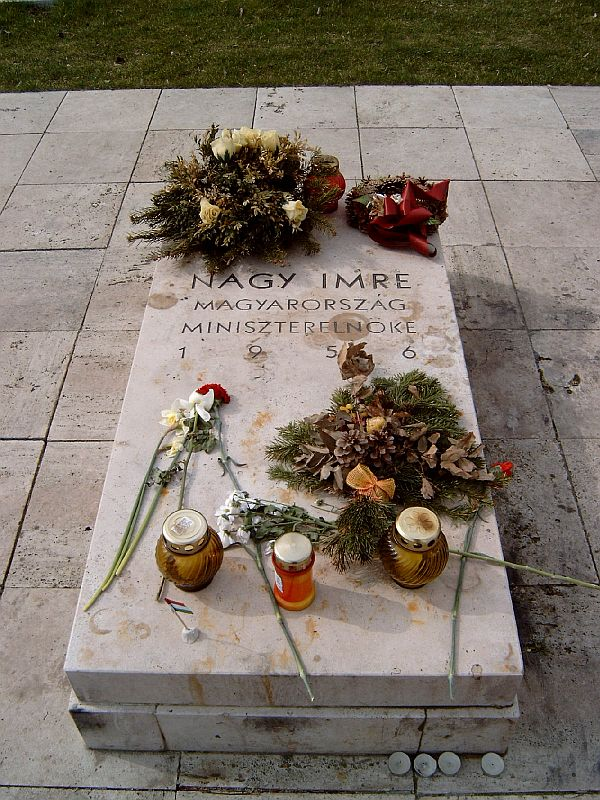

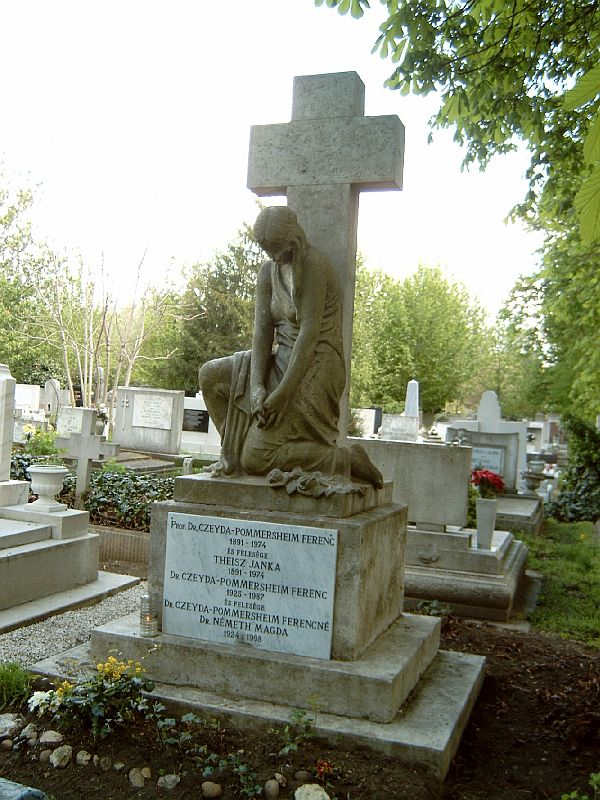

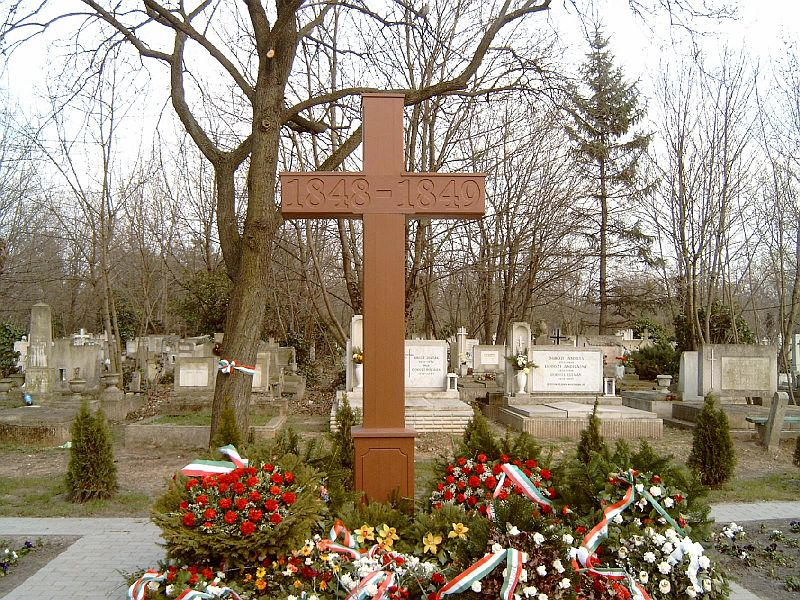

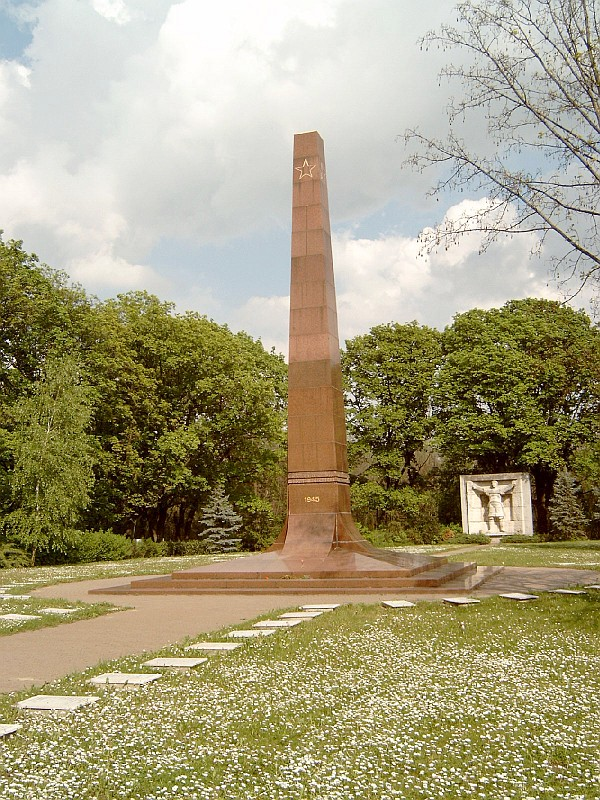

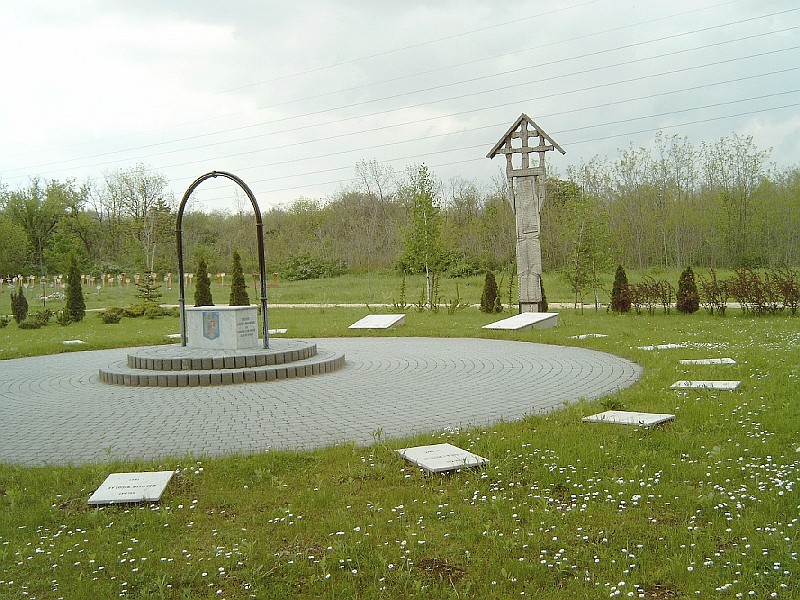

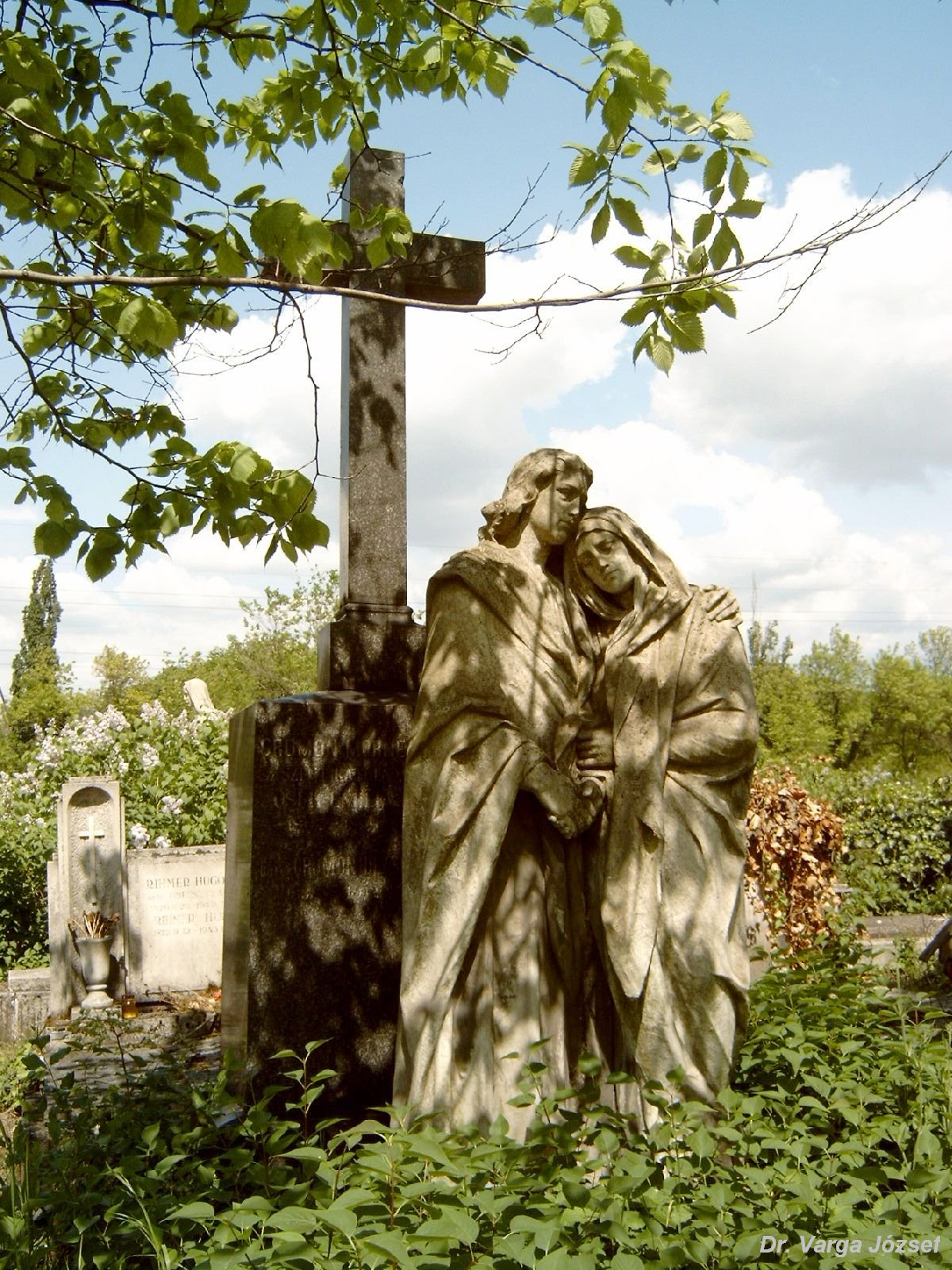

== See also ==
- Kozma Street Cemetery
