= The City is For All =

Volunteer organization in Hungary

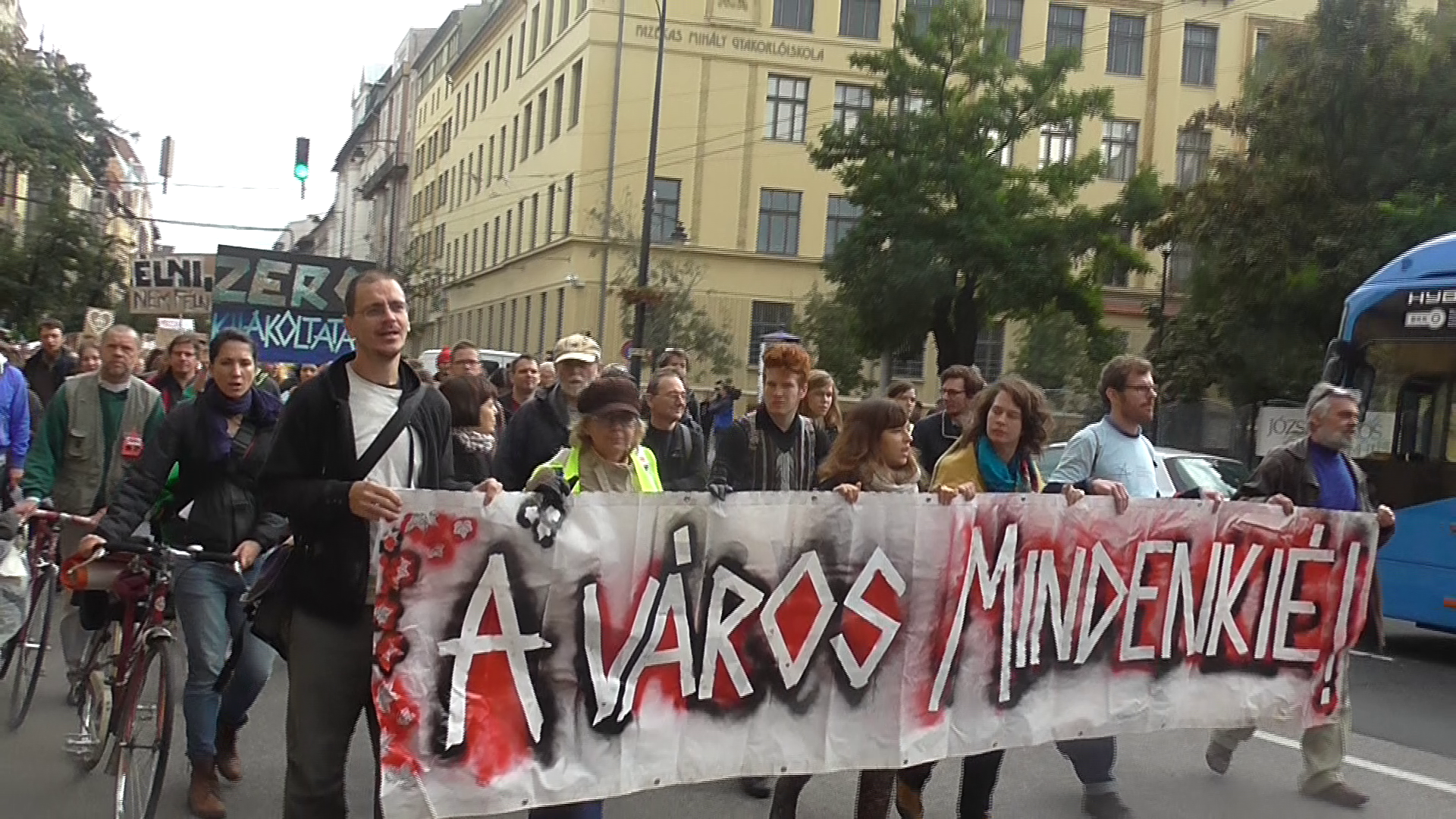
Anti-poverty day 17 October 2015

The City is For All (Hungarian: A Város Mindenkié) is a volunteer based grassroots organization founded in 2009. It operates in Budapest and Pécs in Hungary. Homeless (currently or past) and non-homeless activists work together for housing rights and social justice.

The organization operates as an informal advocacy group. It is an independent group that depends on the volunteer work contribution and financial support of its members. The group represents a wide range of people living in poverty and/or homelessness. The group's goal is to empower homeless people to stand up for their human dignity and to fight for their right to housing. Homeless people play a leading role in all aspects of the group.

== History ==
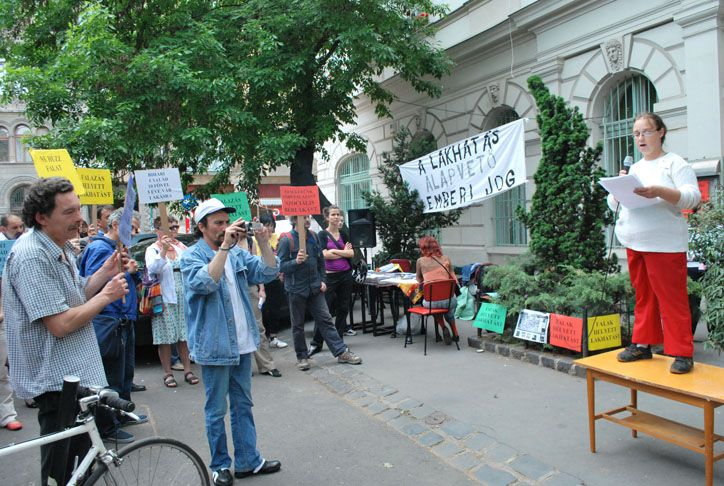
A protest for housing rights

The City is For All was formed with homeless and non-homeless participants of a workshop held by Picture The Homeless from New York, after their visit to Budapest in August, 2009. The workshops were financially supported by the Projects for Peace initiative. A second group was later set up in Pécs, another Hungarian city, by Gyula Balog.

The founding of the organization has been inspired by the Right to the city concept formulated by Henri Lefebvre and David Harvey, and the organization is a member of the Hungarian Right to the City alliance.

The group is totally volunteer run and as of 2018 had around 50 participants, of whom 80% were either homeless or had previously been homeless.

Other organizations have begun within The City is For All and then spun off into their own remit. 'From the Streets into Housing' (Hungarian: Utcáról Lakásba Egyesület) is a group which takes on empty apartments and converts them into social housing. As of March 2019, From the Streets into Housing was managing 23 flats in Budapest. 'The School For Public Life' (Hungarian: Közélet Iskolája) trains activists in organization skills, using computers and speaking English. Having been an internal City is For All project for five years, the school then broadened its operations to working with people from other groups. 'Street Lawyers' provides voluntary legal support and advice. This group began in 2010, when people would go to Blaha Lujza Square every Friday afternoon to offer legal support to homeless people.

== Activities ==
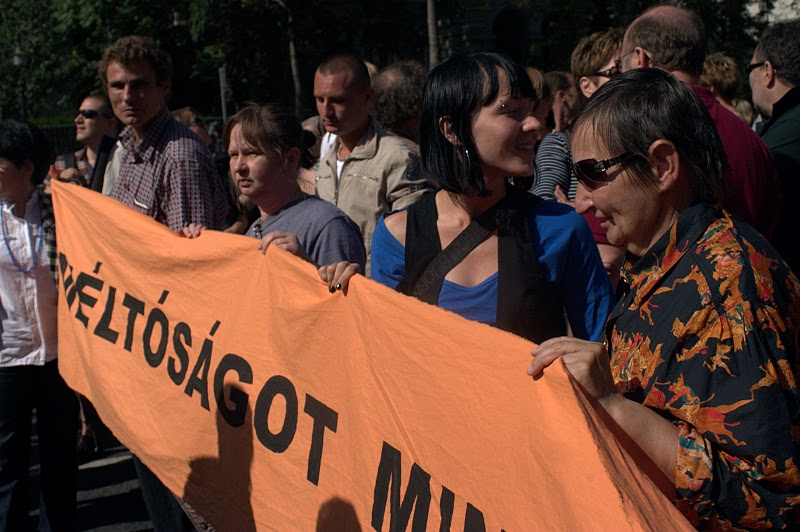
"Dignity for everyone" – Marching at the Budapest Pride 2009

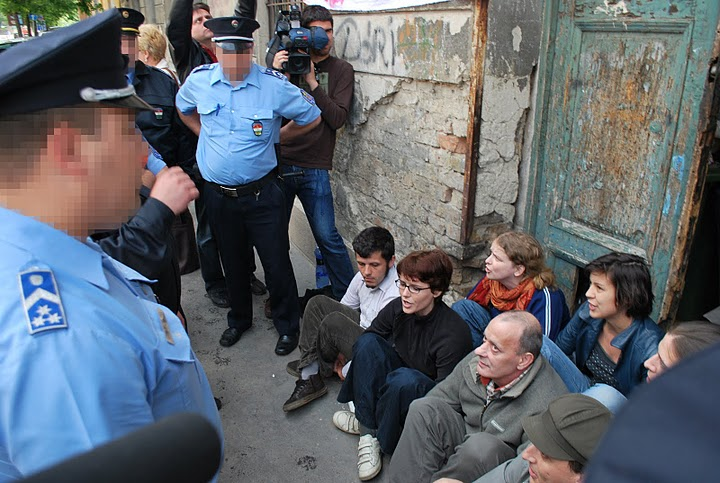
Civil disobedience against a forced eviction, 2010

The City is for All regularly organizes events that contribute to the protection of homeless people's rights, advocate for their interests, and change the social perception of homeless people. The group has been involved in an anti-eviction campaign, including civil disobedience against forced evictions.

The group frequently appears in the media in order to change the misconception that homeless people are incapable and hopeless.

This City is For All works together with other grassroots organizations representing the concerns of marginalized and oppressed groups. It cultivates international connections as well, exemplified by participation in the European Social Forum, in the Social Action Exchange project, in the International Alliance of Inhabitants or a discussion of student and homeless activists with American geographer Neil Smith and Canadian academic Deborah E. Cowen in 2010. The group participated in the 2009 FEANTSA conference "Sharing the power – working together: Participation as a tool to solve homelessness" in Copenhagen and in the 2010 University of Barcelona – Associació Prohabitatge – FEANTSA conference "Housing Rights: from Theory to Practice" in Barcelona.

In June 2010, the group held a workshop for Slovenian social workers and homeless people on self-organizing at a conference organized by Slovenian street newspaper NGO Kings of the Street.

Justice on the Streets was a participatory action research inquiry run by City is For All between 2011 and 2013. The project collected data related and studied personal experiences of homeless regarding discrimination against by the representatives of the Hungarian state in Budapest.

On 19 January 2013 thirty housing activists were arrested on misdemeanor charges for disobeying police orders after they had squatted an empty house in the Erzsébetváros district of Budapest. The City is For All supported the demands of the activists to put the derelict house back into use.

The City is For All combined with FEANTSA again later in 2013, to organise a one-day seminar entitled 'Promoting Housing rights in Hungary'.
