= Jewish cemetery, Roßau =

Historic cemetery in Vienna

Coordinates: 48°13′25″N 16°21′45″E

Jewish Cemetery (Roßau)
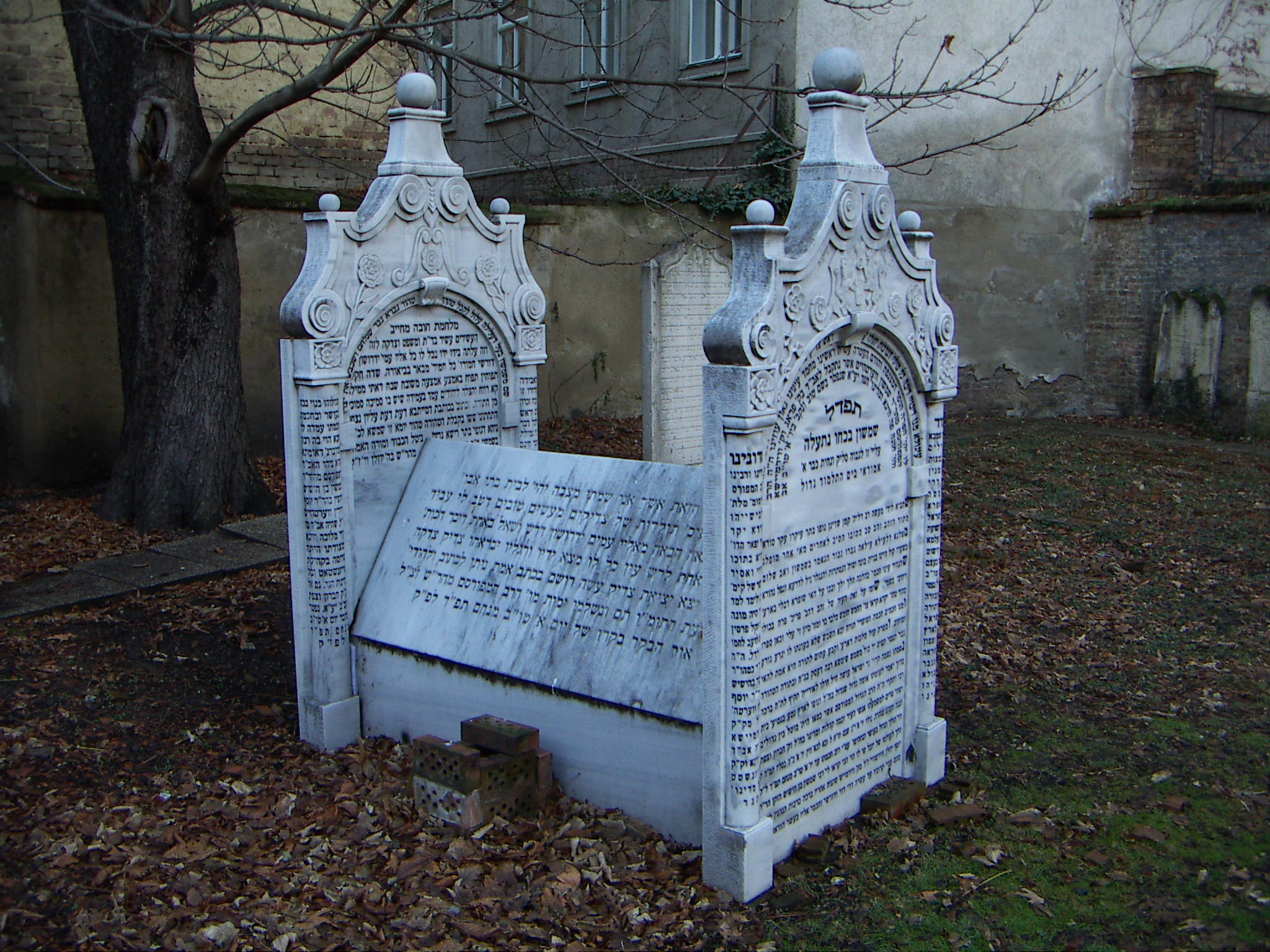
- A memorial stone at the cemetery
- Interactive map of Jewish Cemetery (Roßau)

Details
- Established: 1540
- Location: Alsergrund, Vienna
- Country: Austria
- Style: Jewish, (closed)
- Size: 2,000 square metres (0.49 acres)

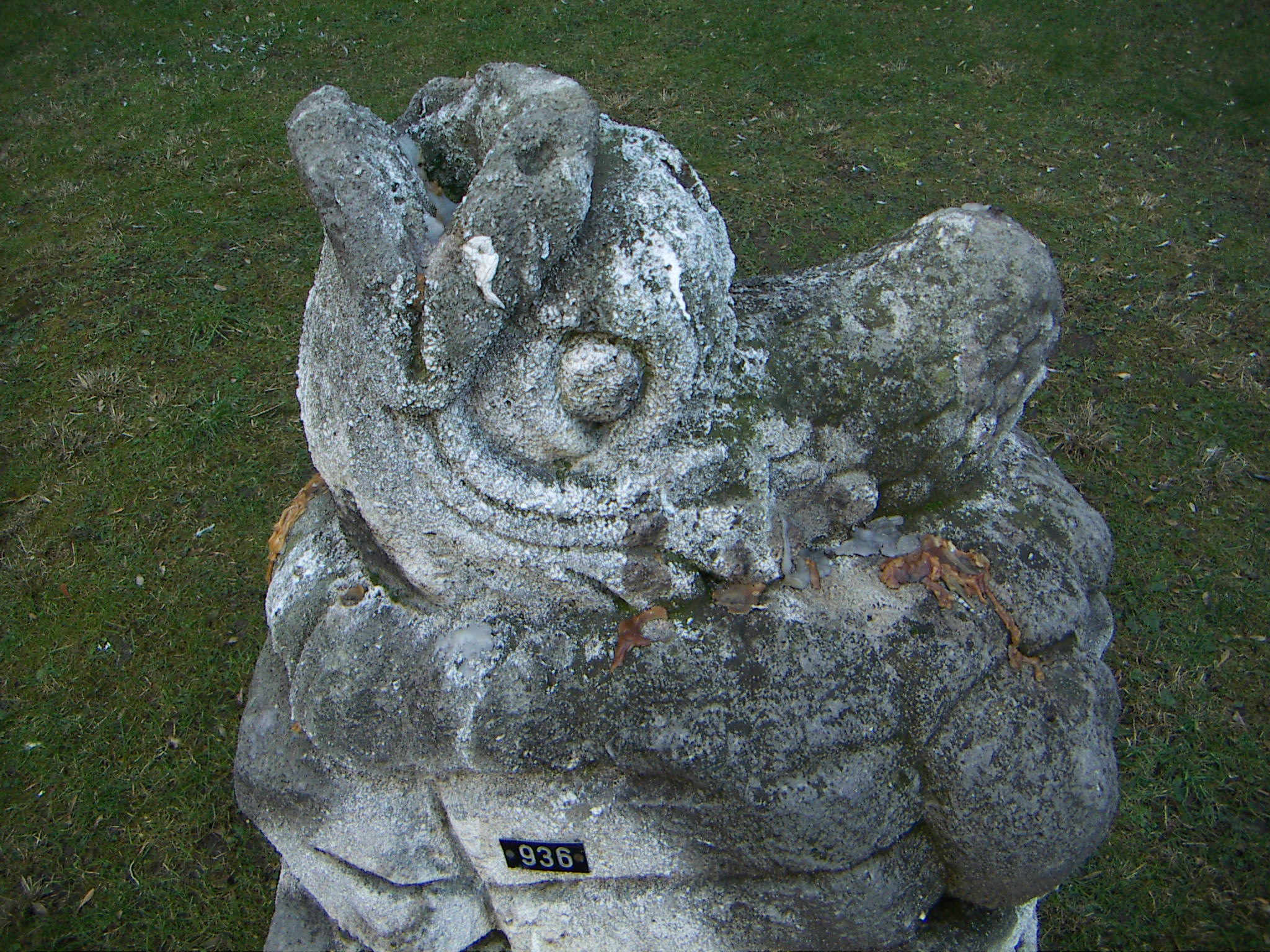
Simeon and the talking fish

The Jewish cemetery in Roßau, which is also known at the Seegasse Jewish cemetery (German: Jüdischer Friedhof Seegasse) because of its location in the Seegasse, is the oldest preserved cemetery in Vienna. Members of the city's Jewish community were buried here between 1540 and 1783.

== Location ==
The Jewish cemetery lies in the suburb of Roßau in the 9th district of Vienna, Alsergrund, and covers an area of approximately 2000 m^{2}. Today, the site is part of the yard of the old people's home in the Seegasse and can be accessed via the home. Where the home now stands, there used to be a Jewish establishment for quarantining the sick (in order to prevent a spread of infectious diseases).

In 1629, the Seegasse was known as the Gassel allwo der Juden Grabstätte (approximately: "The little lane with the Jewish burial site"), from 1778 it was known as the Judengasse (Jews' lane). In 1862, it was renamed Seegasse (Lake lane) after a fish pond that used to be in the area which was described in a document from 1415 as a "lake" (See).

== History ==
The Jewish cemetery in the Seegasse was created in the 16th century. Between 1540 and 1783, it was the main burial site for members of Vienna's Jewish community. Following a pogrom against Viennese Jews in 1670, the Jewish merchant Koppel Fränkel paid a sum of 4,000 florins, in return for which the city committed to maintain the cemetery. Use of the cemetery as a burial site continued thereafter until 1783, when emperor Joseph II forbade the use of all cemeteries within the city walls.

A new cemetery for the Jewish community was created outside the city walls in the suburb of Währing (see Jewish Cemetery (Währing)). In line with the edicts of the Jewish religion, the cemetery in the Seegasse was left untouched, while Christian cemeteries within the city walls were closed and built over.

In 1943, the Nazi authorities resolved to raze the cemetery and to build over the site. A group of engaged Viennese Jews responded by removing some of the gravestones, which they buried at the city's main cemetery, the Zentralfriedhof. In the 1980s, 280 of the 931 gravestones that were buried there were rediscovered and returned to their original homes as recorded in Bernhard Wachstein’s surveys of the cemetery from the 1910s. The cemetery was sanctified once again on 2 September 1984.

The inscriptions on the gravestones in the cemetery are entirely in Hebrew.
