= Sonia Wachstein =

American psychotherapist (1907 - 2001)

- Born: Sophie Wachstein; October 25, 1907; Vienna, Austria
- Died: August 10, 2001 (aged 93); New York City, New York, U.S.
- Education: University of Vienna (PhD); Bryn Mawr College (MA)
- Occupation(s): Teacher, social worker, psychotherapist
- Website: Sonia Wachstein Collection

Sonia Wachstein (born Sophie) was an Austrian-American psychotherapist, social worker, and writer. She was born October 25, 1907, in Vienna, Austria, and died in New York City, New York, August 10, 2001.

== Early and Family Life ==
Sonia was the daughter of Bernhard Wachstein, a well-known historian, bibliographer, and genealogist, and Marie (née Weiss) Wachstein, as well as the sister of Max Wachstein. Bernhard Wachstein was the director of the Library of the Israelitische Kultusgemeinde Wien, the Jewish community of Vienna. She grew up in the western part of Leopoldstadt where there were few Jews. However, her family was consciously Jewish and attended salons with Jews which included aspiring and well established personalities in science, arts, music and literature. As a child Wachstein recalls sitting at the children's table with Hilde Spiel who noted she did not like women who talked to much (she was pointing at Wachstein's mother). In her early years, Sonia was homeschooled by her mother.

She joined the Socialist Workers' Youth and later the Social Democratic Workers' Party (SDAP). She later withdrew from actively working in the SDAP due to its antisemitic sentiments, although it was the only major Austrian party that was not programmatically antisemitic. However, like her Jewish contemporaries, she was caught off guard by the Anschluss in March 1938. She had visited a friend in Palestine in the summer of 1937 and declined his marriage proposal because she did not want to leave Austria. In 1938 she wrote a letter to Charles Vane-Tempest-Stewart Londonderry asking for his help in securing the release of her brother Max Wachstein, a physician, who was in the Dachau concentration camp. He was permitted to leave in 1939 and went to work at Guy's Hospital in London before moving to New York City in 1940 where he eventually became director of laboratories at Beth Israel Hospital.

== Education and Occupation ==
Wachstein attended Hietzing Gymnasium. She later studied English and German at the University of Vienna receiving her Ph.D. in 1932. After completing her PhD, she taught for five years at Zwi-Perez-Chajes Gymnasium in Vienna, where she had also attended. In 1939, she immigrated to London, England, where she worked for the Jewish Refugee Committee and taught both English and German to refugees and other immigrants through 1943.

In 1944, Wachstein immigrated to New York City, where she made a living teaching German at Brooklyn College. She was a visiting instructor at Vassar College May–June 1944. She then entered a work-study program where she went on to earn her Masters of Arts in social work at the Graduate School of Social Work at Bryn Mawr College in Pennsylvania, finishing in 1946. Her dissertation title was Changing Attitudes in Relatives' Responsibilities (Observations made in the Welfare Office of a Japanese Relocation Center). She then became a supervisor in the Brooklyn school system. Wachstein became a U.S. citizen March 29, 1949. From 1952 until her retirement in 1977, she worked as a social worker and department head in the New York City Bureau of Child Guidance. In 1965 she was awarded a Fulbright Scholar grant to lecture at Catholic University of Peru.

Following retirement, she worked as a psychotherapist for adults with behavioral problems and taught English to Russian students at Bryn Mawr College. In 1992, Wachstein returned to Vienna and visited the Zwi-Perez-Chajes Gymnasium which had re-opened in 1984 and was graduating its first class since 1938. It was an "emotional highlight" for the students to hear Wachstein share her reflections from her time teaching at the school.

== Published Works ==
Wachstein published several articles regarding the development, analysis, and treatment of childhood mental disorders. Two of her works, published in the journal Child Welfare, are Child Guidance Without Involving Parents? and News from the Field, Bedford Stuyvesant's PS83. A School for Healing. She also published an article entitled, An Austrian Solution to the Problem of Child Placement. These works were focused on offering tangible solutions to growing mental health concerns among adolescents in school after World War II. In 2001 she published Too Deep Were Our Roots: A Viennese Jewish memoir of the years between the two world wars (foreword by James Monaco), a personal account of her memories living in Vienna between World War I and World War II.

== Legacy ==
Sonia Wachstein was known for her research in social work and psychotherapy. She published research about equity problems in youth mental health based on her direct observation in the New York City Public School system. As early as the 1960s, Sonia Wachstein observed the evident socioeconomic divide regarding access to privatized healthcare, especially therapy and other mental health services. In spite of this, she advocated for direct psychiatric and psychological screening in public schools, clear pathways from a social worker to a therapist, and confidentiality for youth in therapy sessions without parents present.
