= Jewish cemeteries in Ostrów Wielkopolski =

Cemeteries in Poland

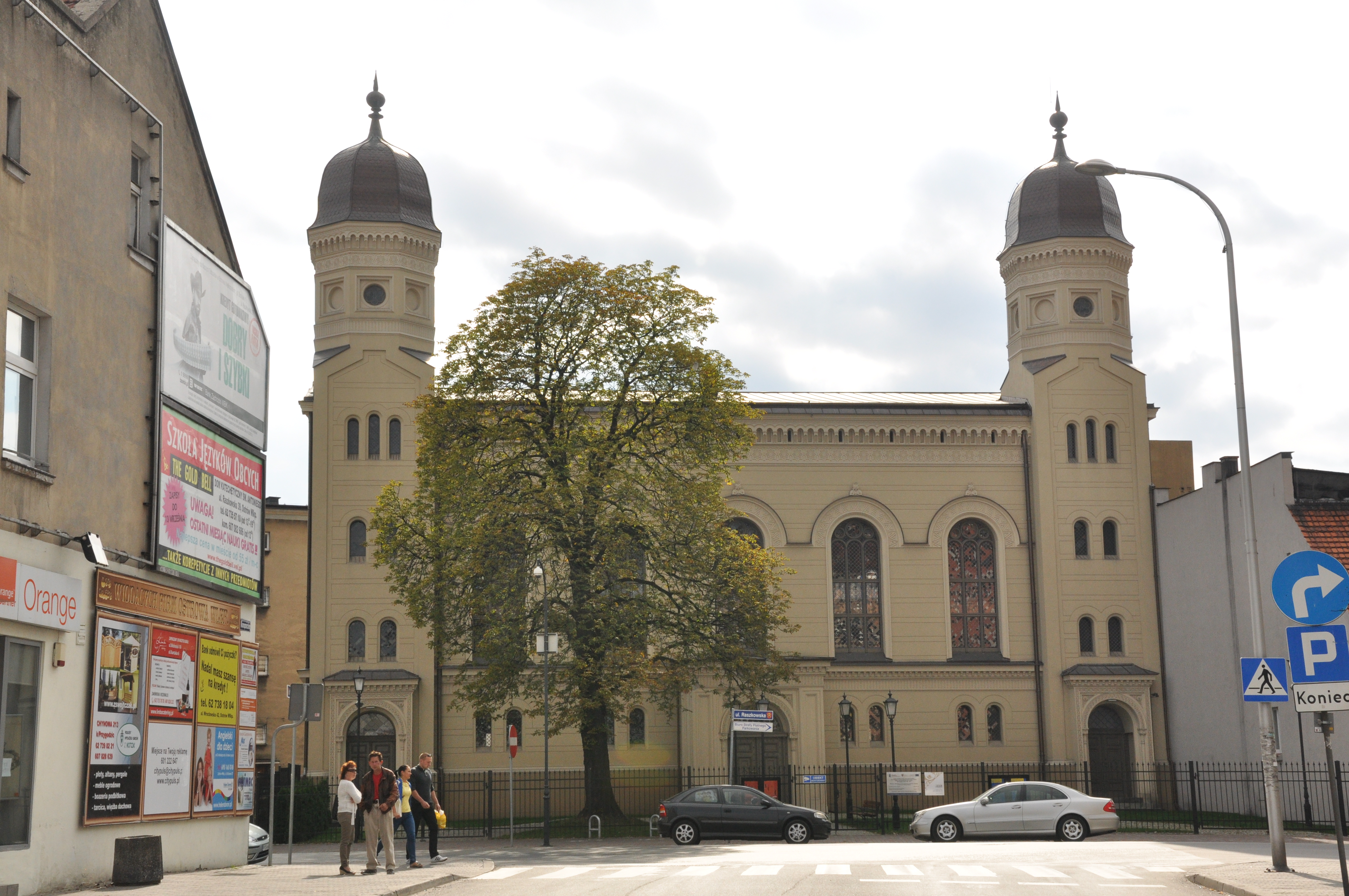
Synagogue of Ostrów Wielkopolski built in 1857–1860 (after renovation)

There were two Jewish cemeteries in Ostrów Wielkopolski, Poland. Under an agreement between the town administration and the Jewish community, a lapidarium, collection of stone monuments was made using remaining gravestones from the two sites. In 2006, the architectural recording and preservation of the surviving tombstones work began and a proposal for the construction of the monument was initiated; the construction was made by April 2007.

== The Old Cemetery ==
The first cemetery was built in the center of the Jewish quarter (the west side of the town square) in the beginning of the eighteenth century. It measured only 1,902 square feet (176.7 m^{2}) and was closed by 1780. In 1877, the site was cleared and planted over with greenery. To commemorate the peace following the Franco-German War (1870–1871), the area was named Lasek Przyjaźni (The Grove of Friendship). During World War II, the entire area along with the Jewish quarter was destroyed. During the communist era an electric transformer was set up on the site.

== The New Cemetery ==
The new cemetery was created on the northern outskirts of Ostrów (western edge of the so-called New Quarter), the same year the old cemetery was closed. In 1873, a funeral home was raised up on a 6.9-acre (28,000 m^{2}) lot nearby. During World War II, the tombstones were removed and used as building material. Until 1960, a gardening center operated on its place and then in the 70s, a school was built there. Parts of the land along with the burial remains were then used to build a route into the town center.

== Six Branch Menorah ==
In April 2007, to commemorate the Jewish residents of Ostrów Wielkopolski, the town authorities erected monuments and fenced some of the former cemetery. Unfortunately, the menorahs that are the elements of the fence have only six branches. According to the town authorities' agreement with the Jewish community, the local government was supposed to contact the representatives of the Jewish community regarding any construction work. This did not happen. Also the authorities underestimated its citizenry who pointed out the error in the fence. Its construction was finalized with the error.

== Notes and references ==
- Nowy cmentarz żydowski w Ostrowie Wielkopolskim na portalu Virtual Shtetl (Wirtualny Sztetl)
- Stray cmentarz żydowski w Ostrowie Wielkopolskim na portalu Wirtualny Sztetl
- Lapidarium z Alei słowackiego
- Oddanie Lapidarium z Placu 23 stycznia gminie żydowskie z Wrocławia
- Zdjęcia archiwalne z rozbieranych cmentarzy oraz oczyszczanie pozostałych fragmentów macew
