= Kozma Street Cemetery =

Jewish cemetery in Budapest, Hungary

Coordinates: 47°28′22.25″N 19°10′46.04″E

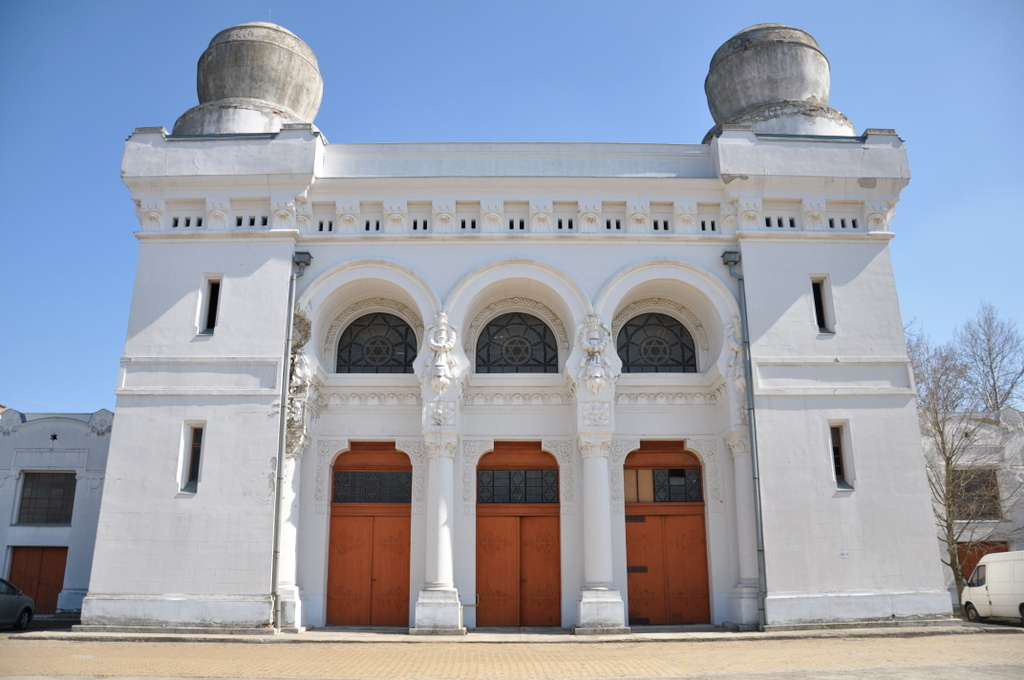
Mortuary

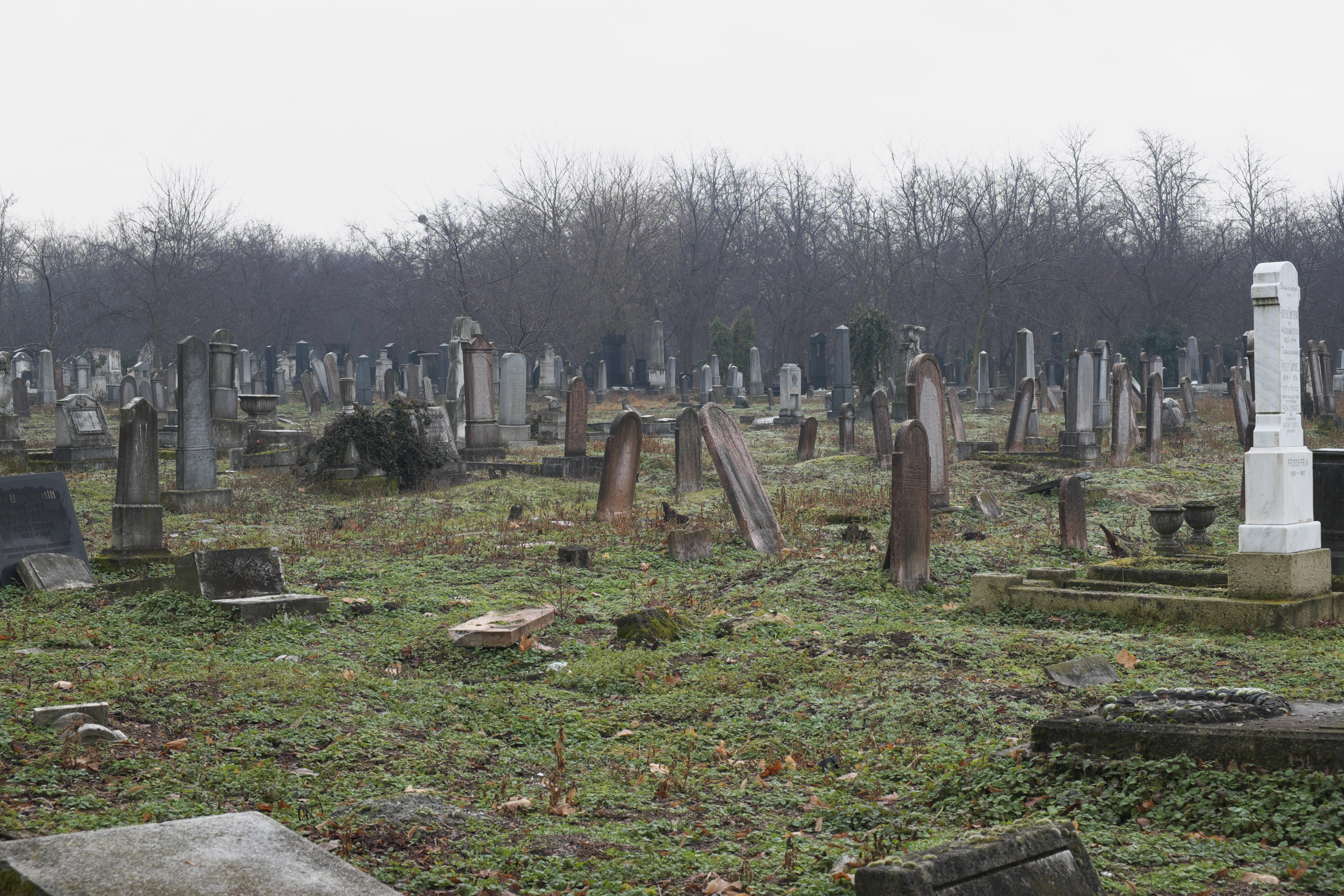
Kozma Street Jewish Cemetery

The Kozma Street Cemetery (Hungarian: Kozma utcai izraelita temető) is the biggest Jewish cemetery of Budapest, Hungary. It is located next to the New Public Cemetery (Újköztemető).

== Jewish cemetery ==
The Jewish cemetery, one of the largest in Europe, is well known for its unusual monuments and mausoleums. Unusually for a Jewish cemetery, these include sculpted human figures and elaborate mausoleums in a variety of styles, most notably several mausoleums in the Art Nouveau or Jugendstil style.

Kozma Street Cemetery was opened in 1891 by the Neolog Jewish community of Budapest. During its history it has been the burial place of more than 300,000 people. It still serves the Hungarian Jewish community, which is the third largest in Europe.

In 2016, the remains of about 20 people, believed to be Jews who were among the thousands shot on the banks of the Danube River in 1944–1945 by the Hungarian Arrow Cross, and which were found during the renovation of a bridge in 2011, were brought to burial at the Kozma Street Cemetery.

== Schmidl Family Mausoleum ==
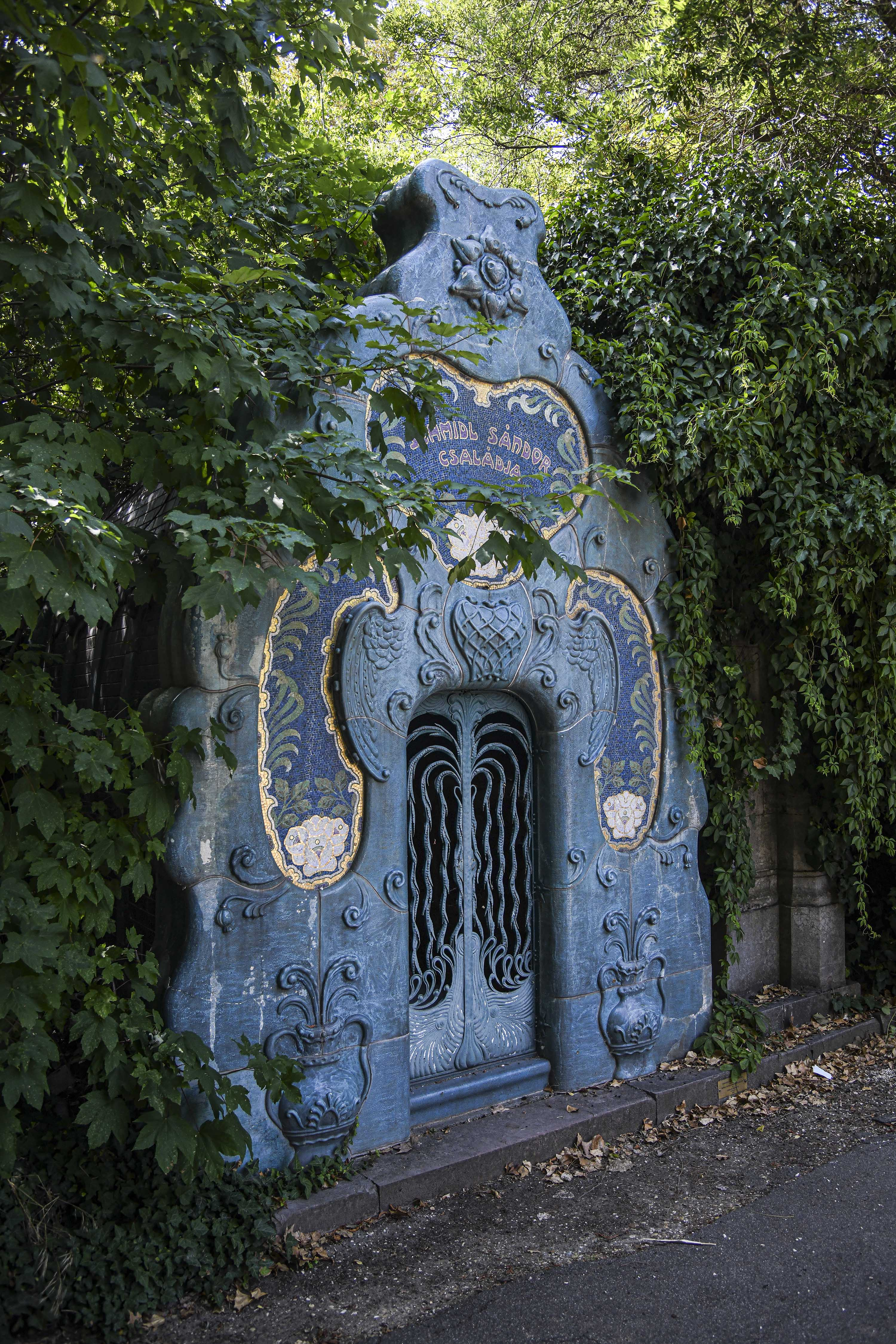
The exterior of the Schmidl Family Mausoleum, at Kozma Street Cemetery in Budapest, Hungary.

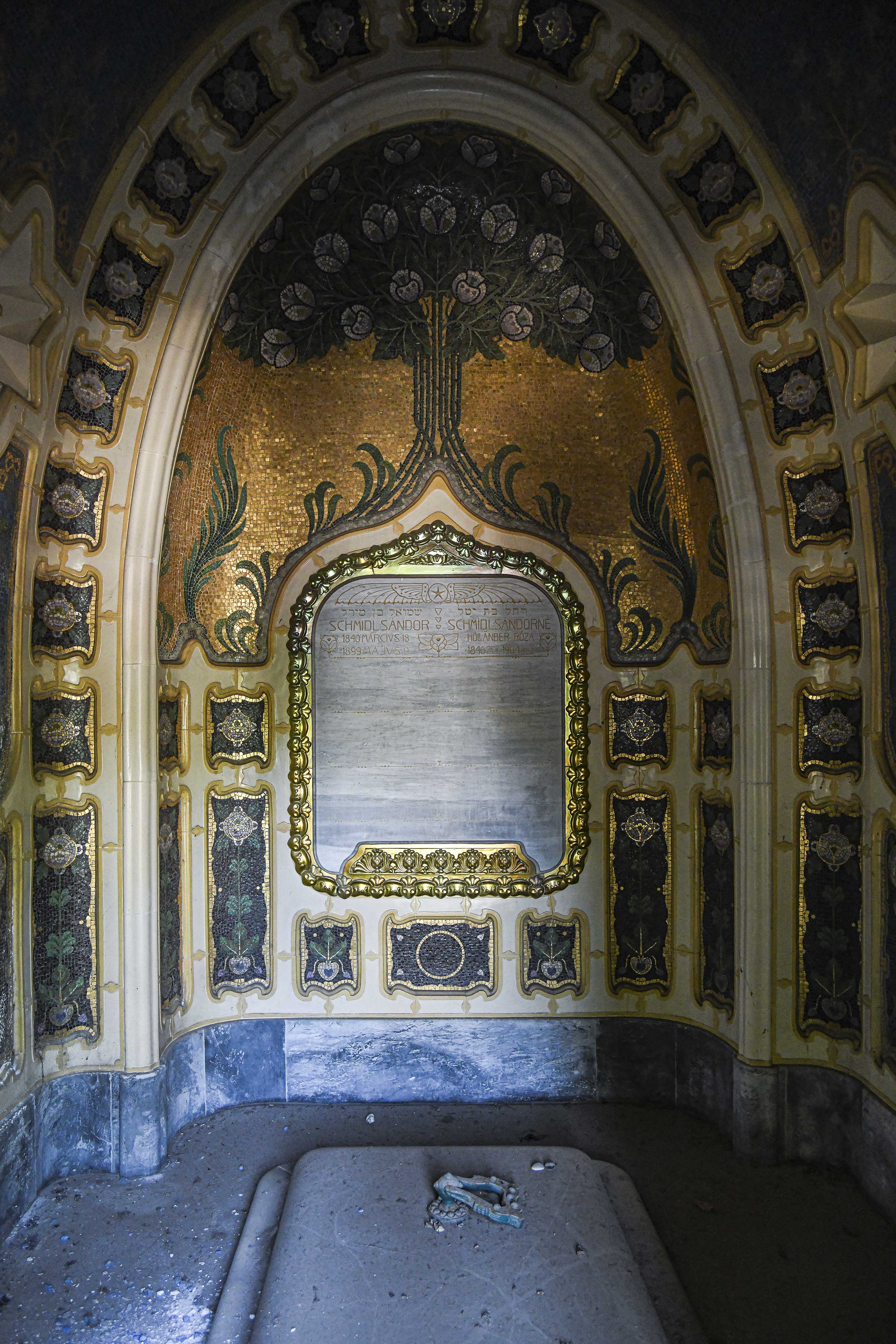
The interior of the mausoleum.

The Schmidl Family Mausoleum, along the western border of the cemetery, is a decorative tomb designed by Béla Lajta — with influences from Ödön Lechner — for Sándor and Róza Schmidl.

Built in the early 1900s, the turquoise-and-gold mausoleum features ceramics from the Zsolnay factory. The structure, which underwent extensive renovations between 1996 and 1998, serves as an example of Hungarian Secessionism and of Hungary’s Jewish funerary art.

== Gallery ==
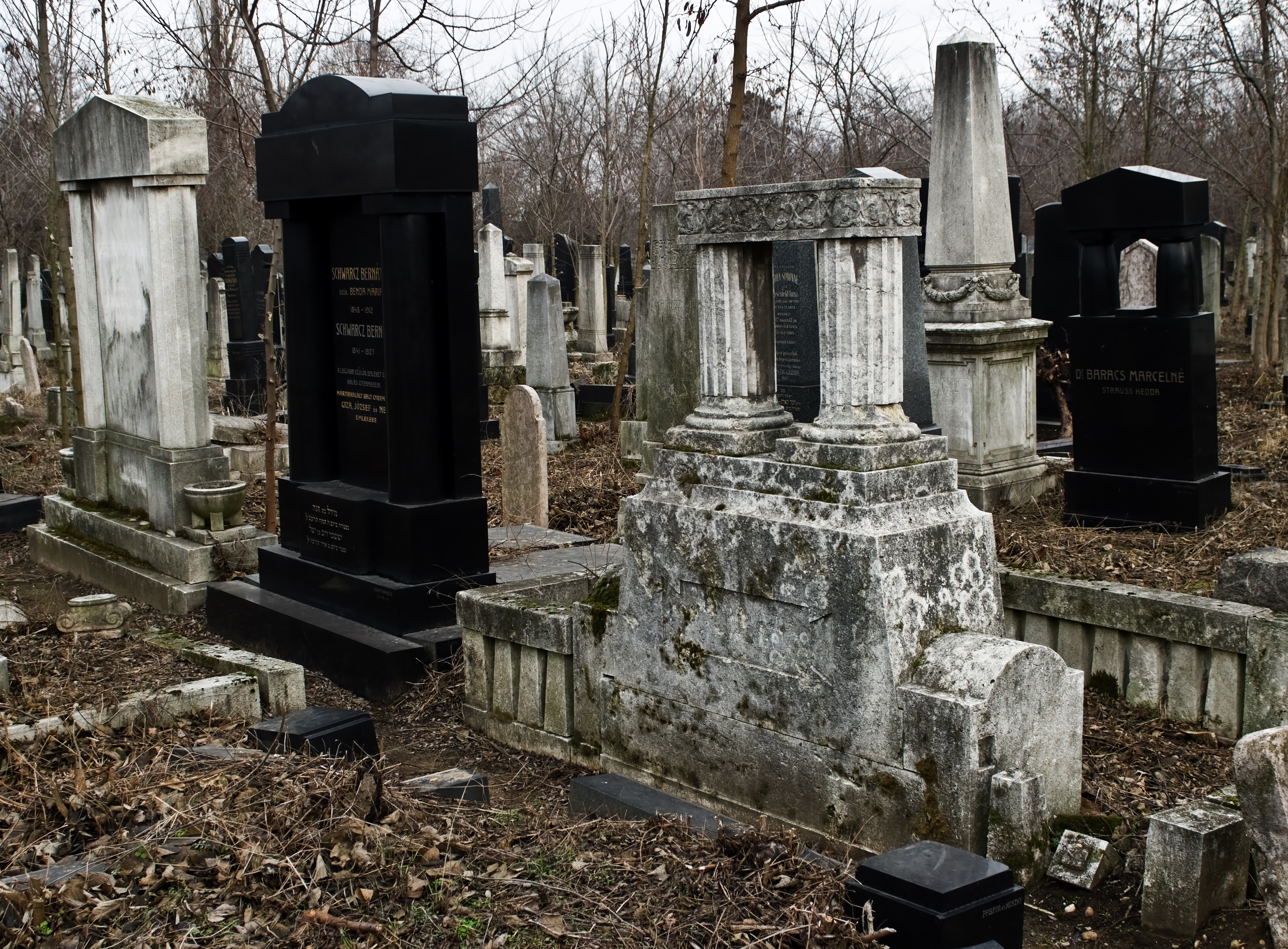

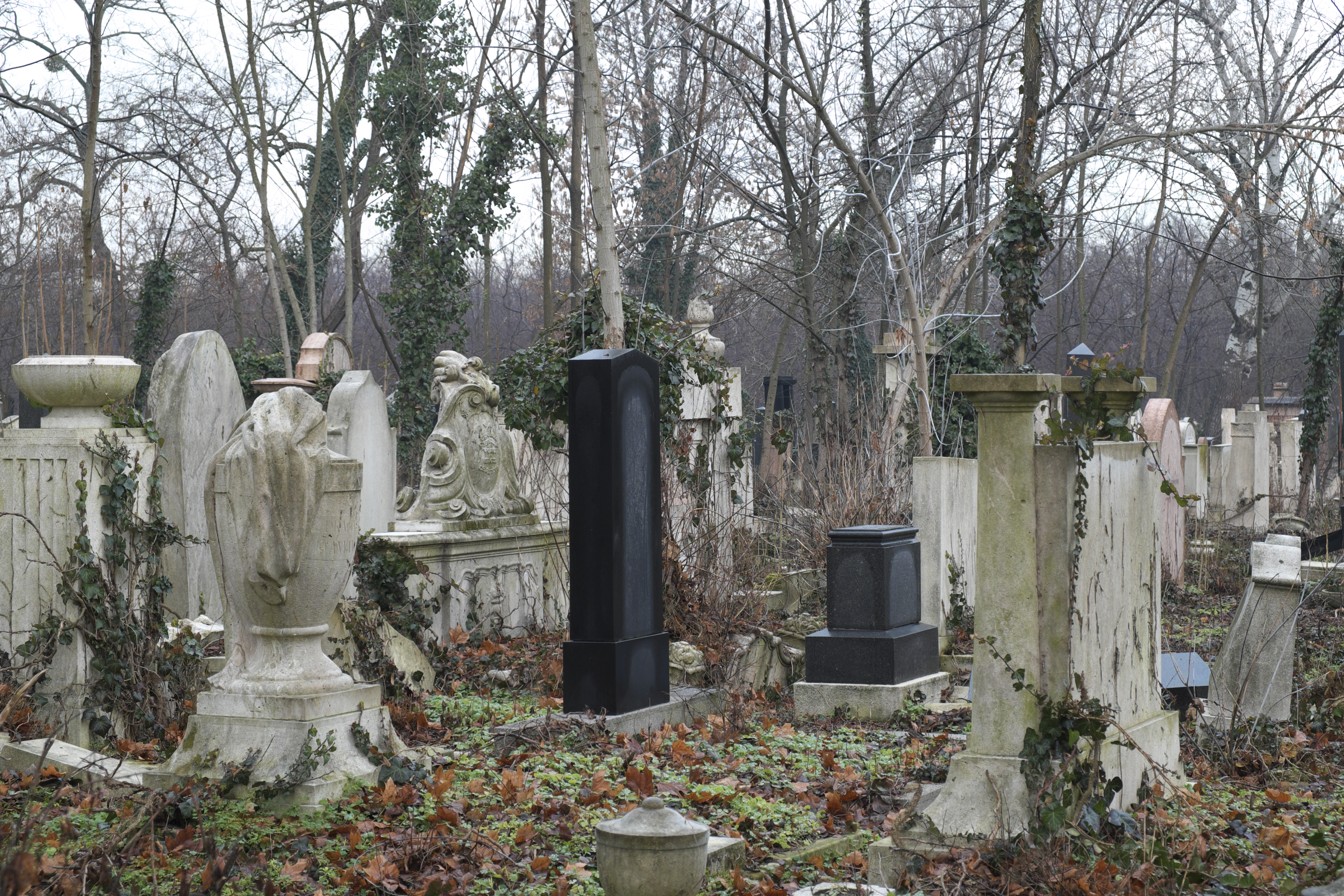

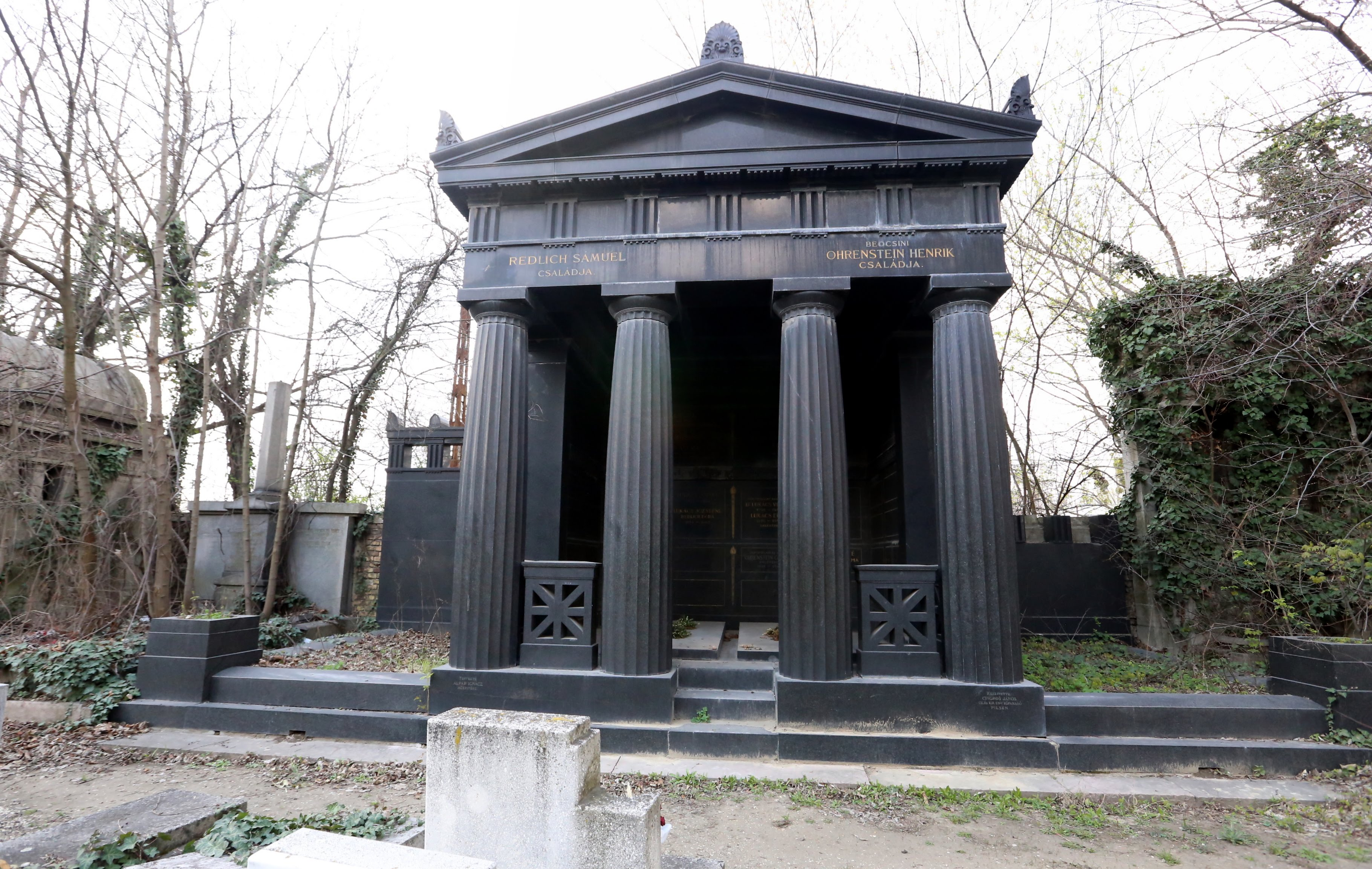

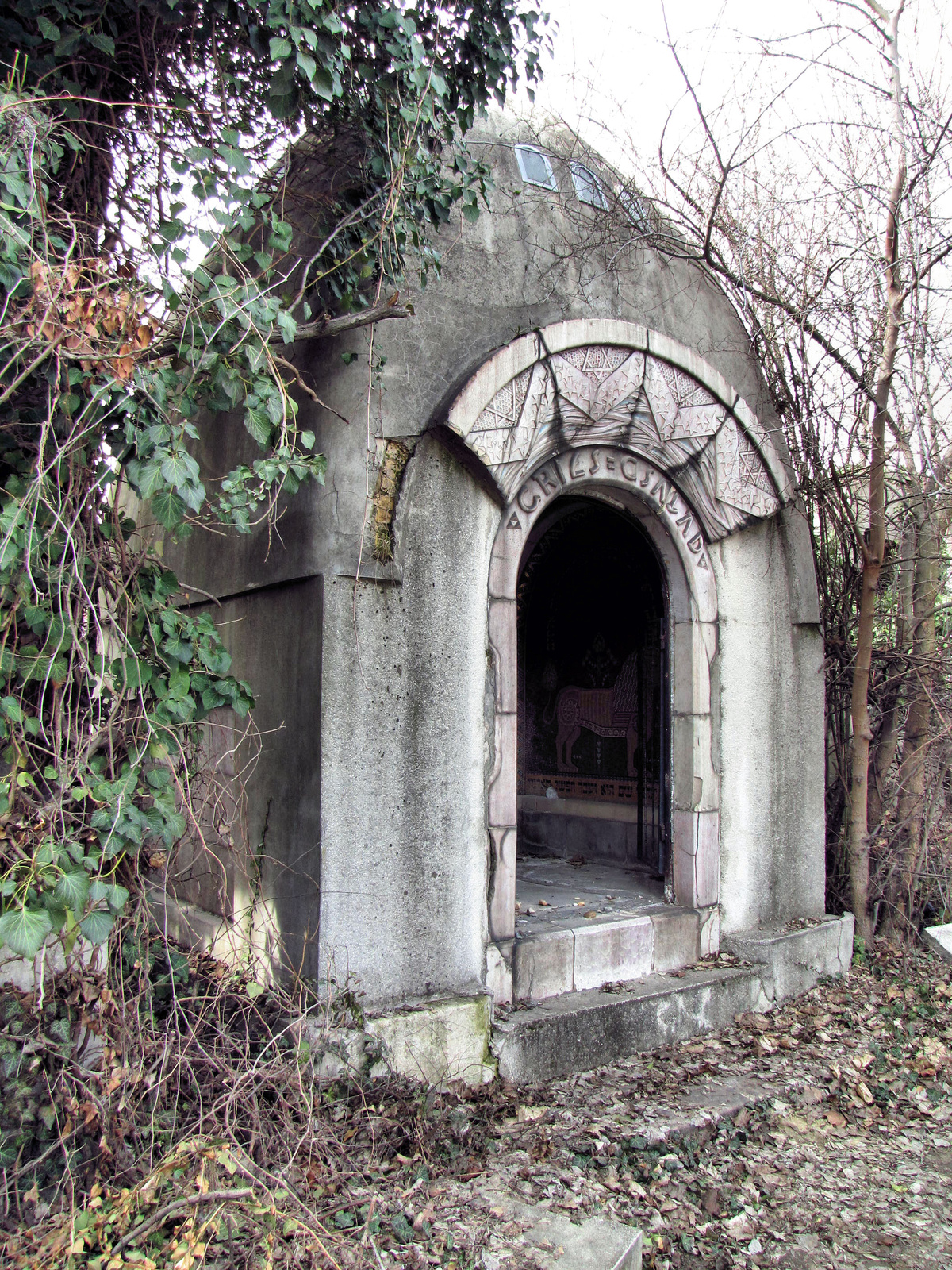

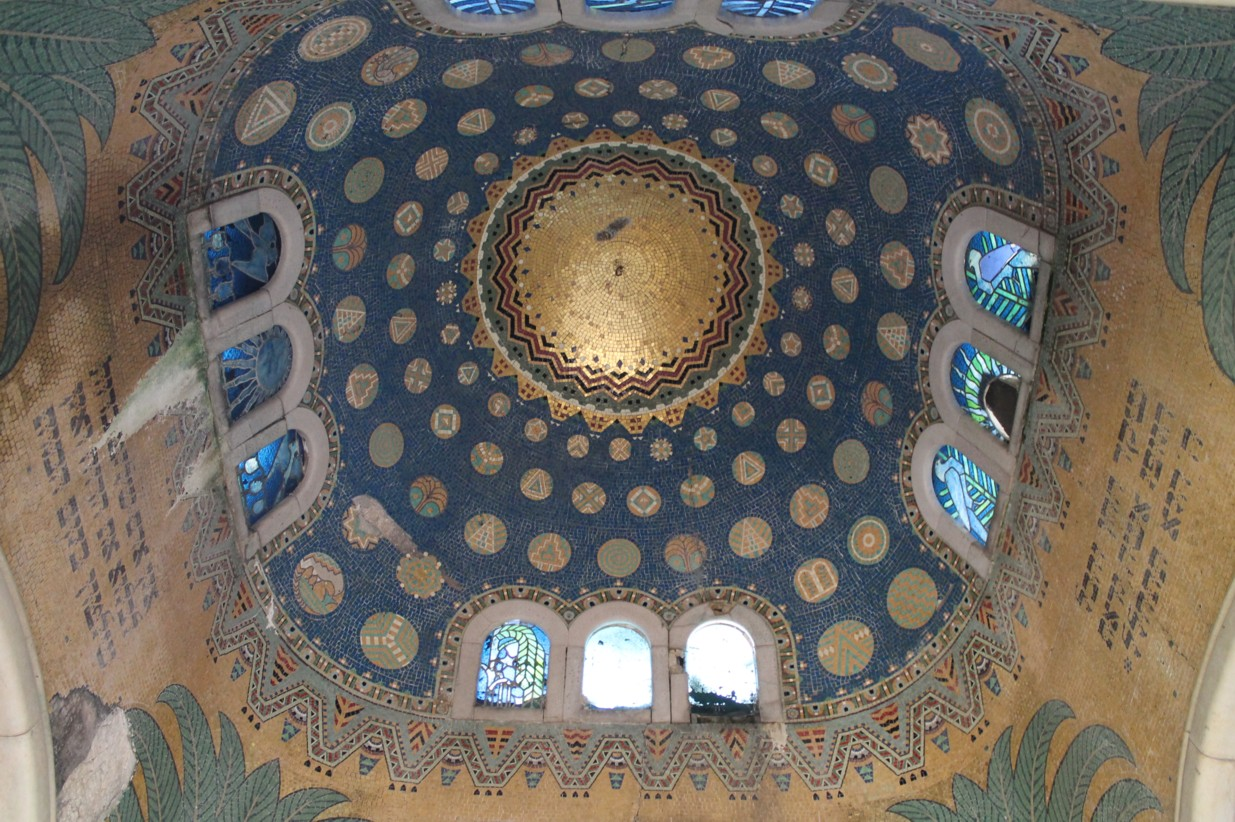

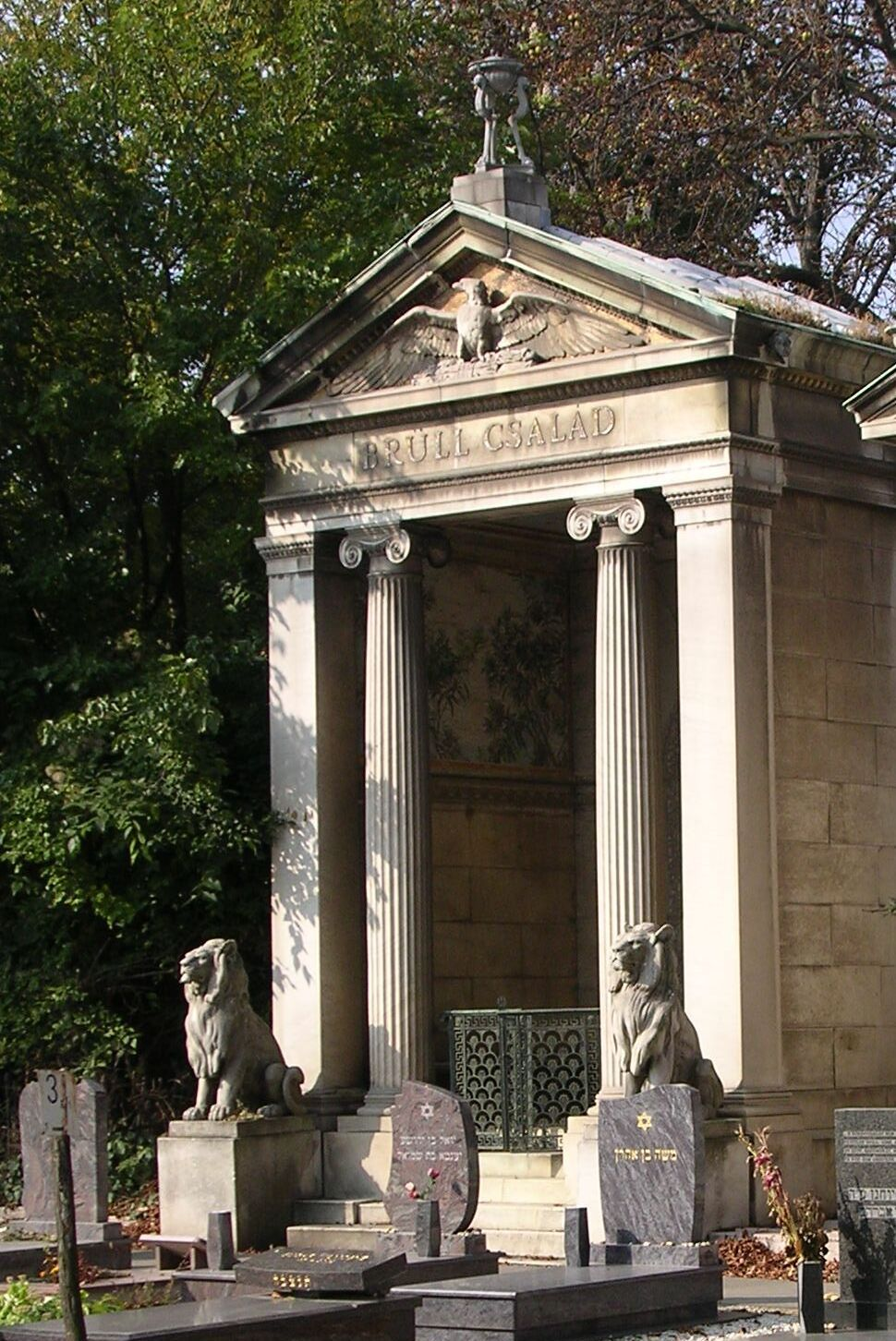

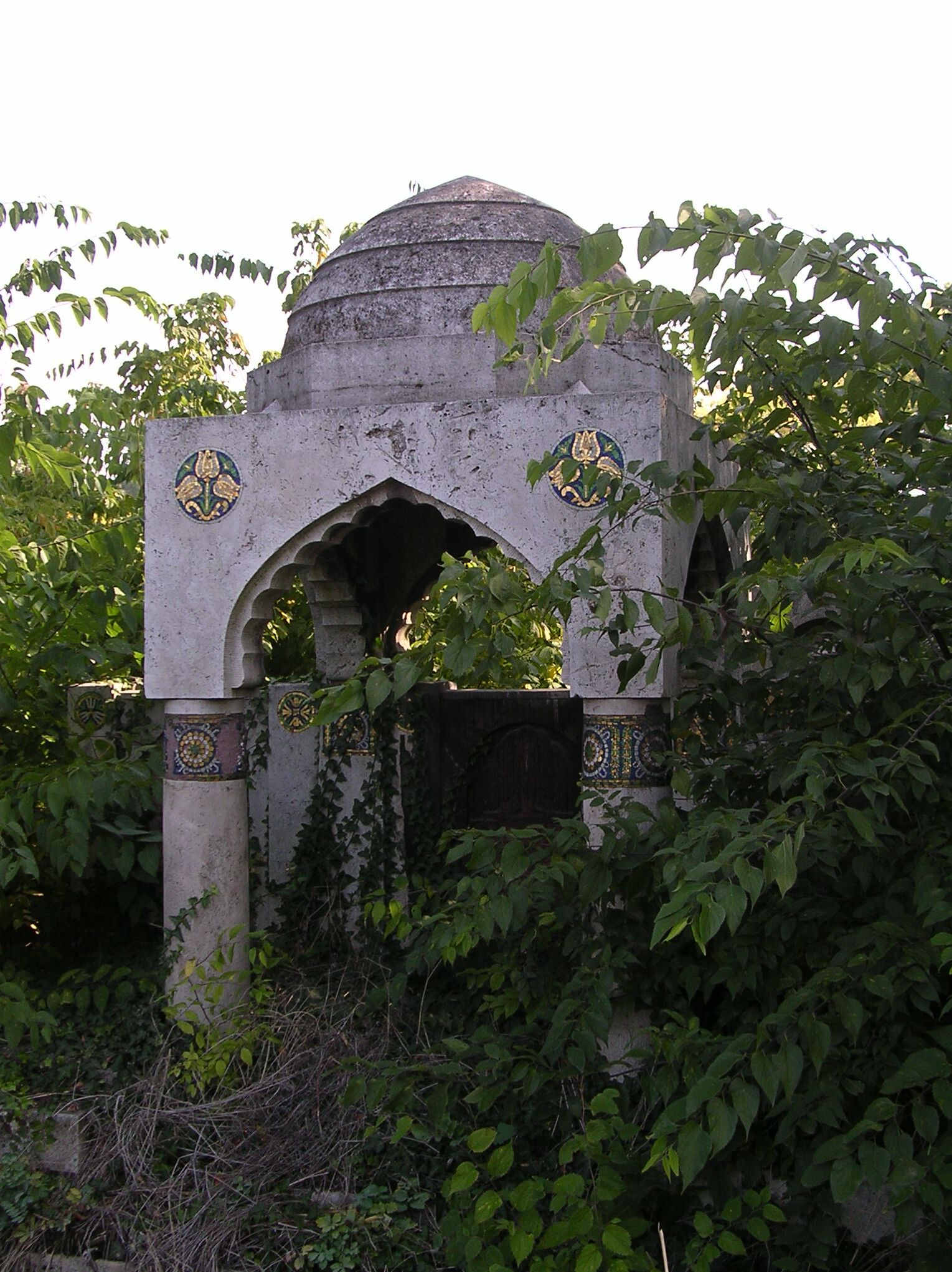

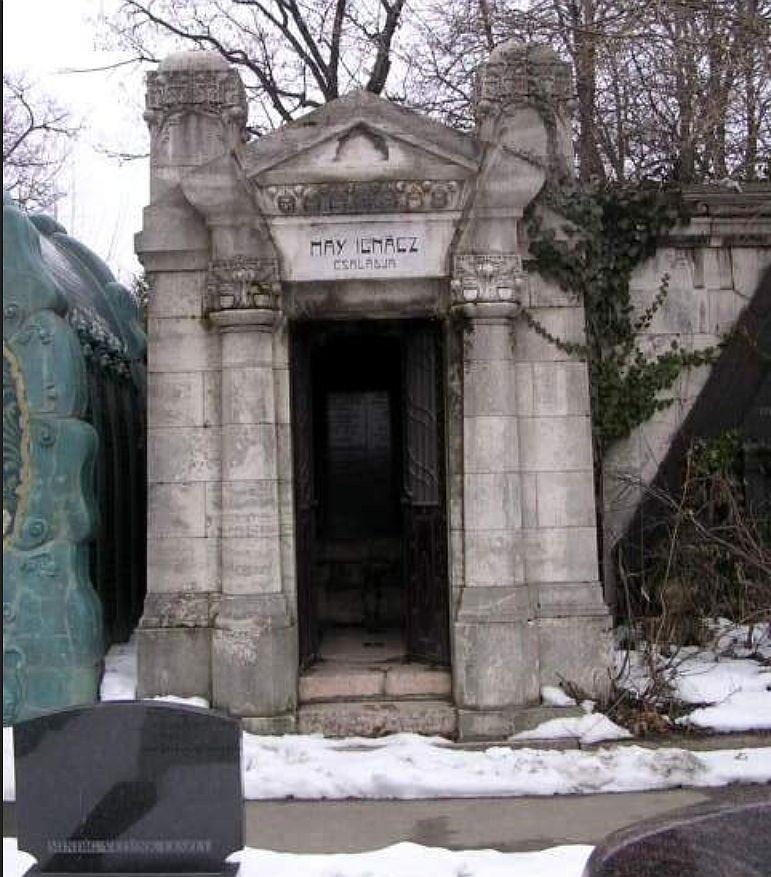

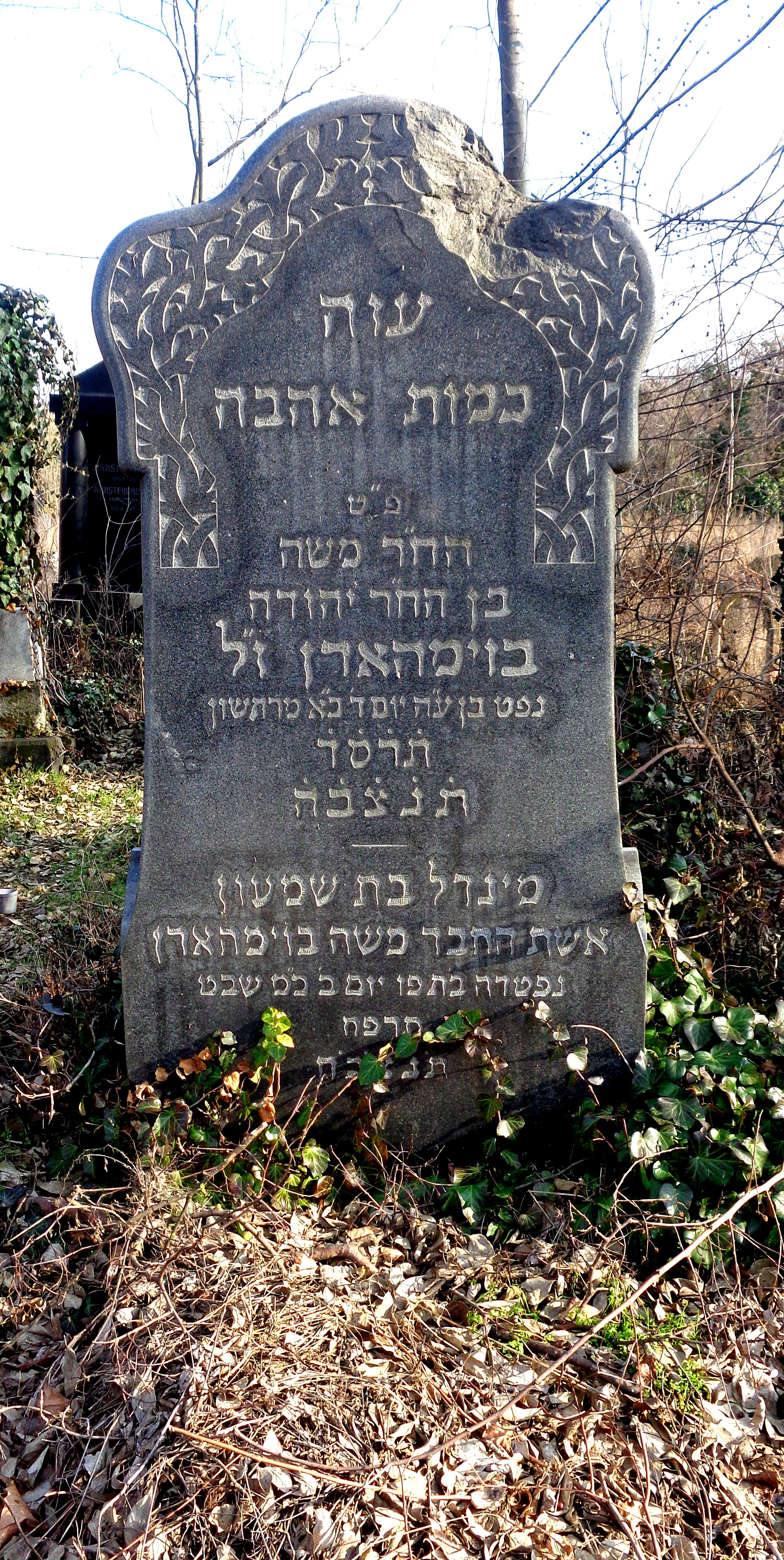

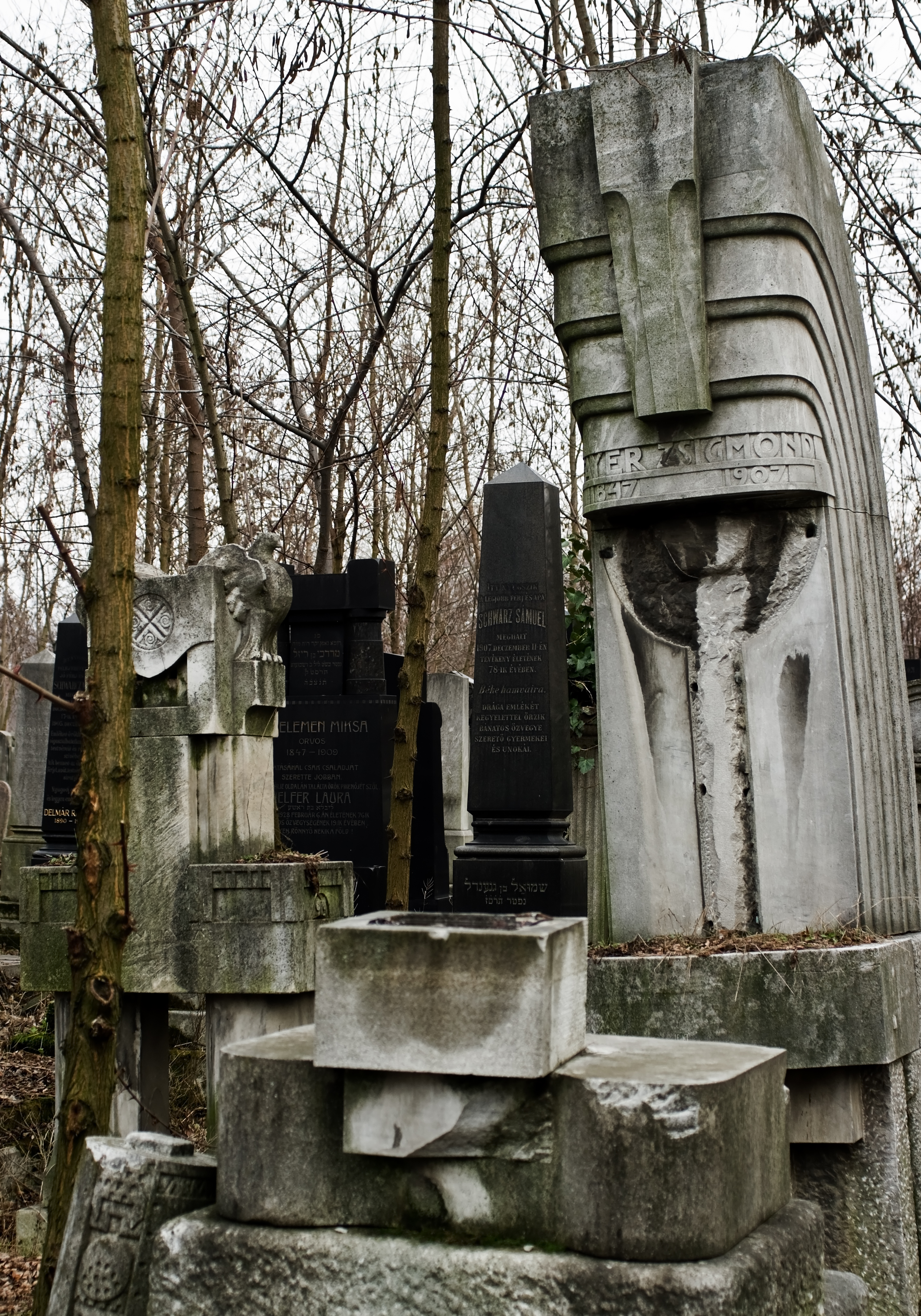

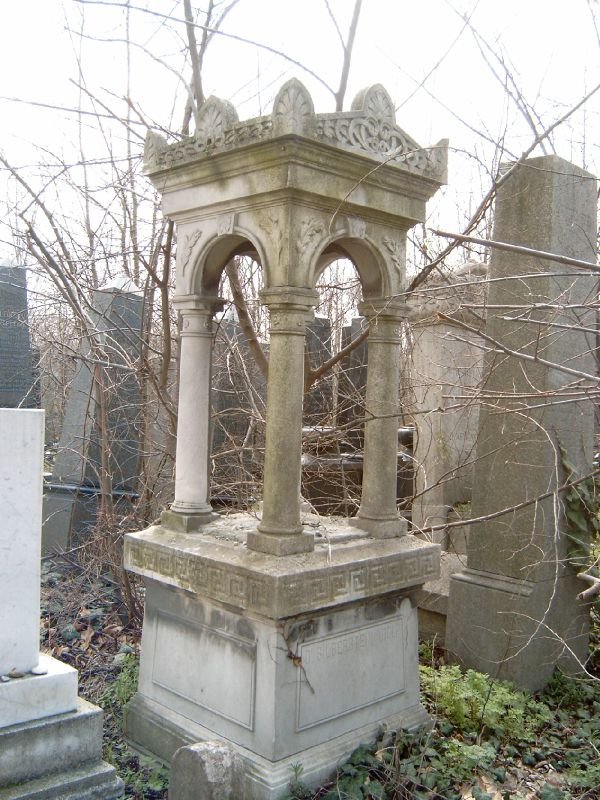

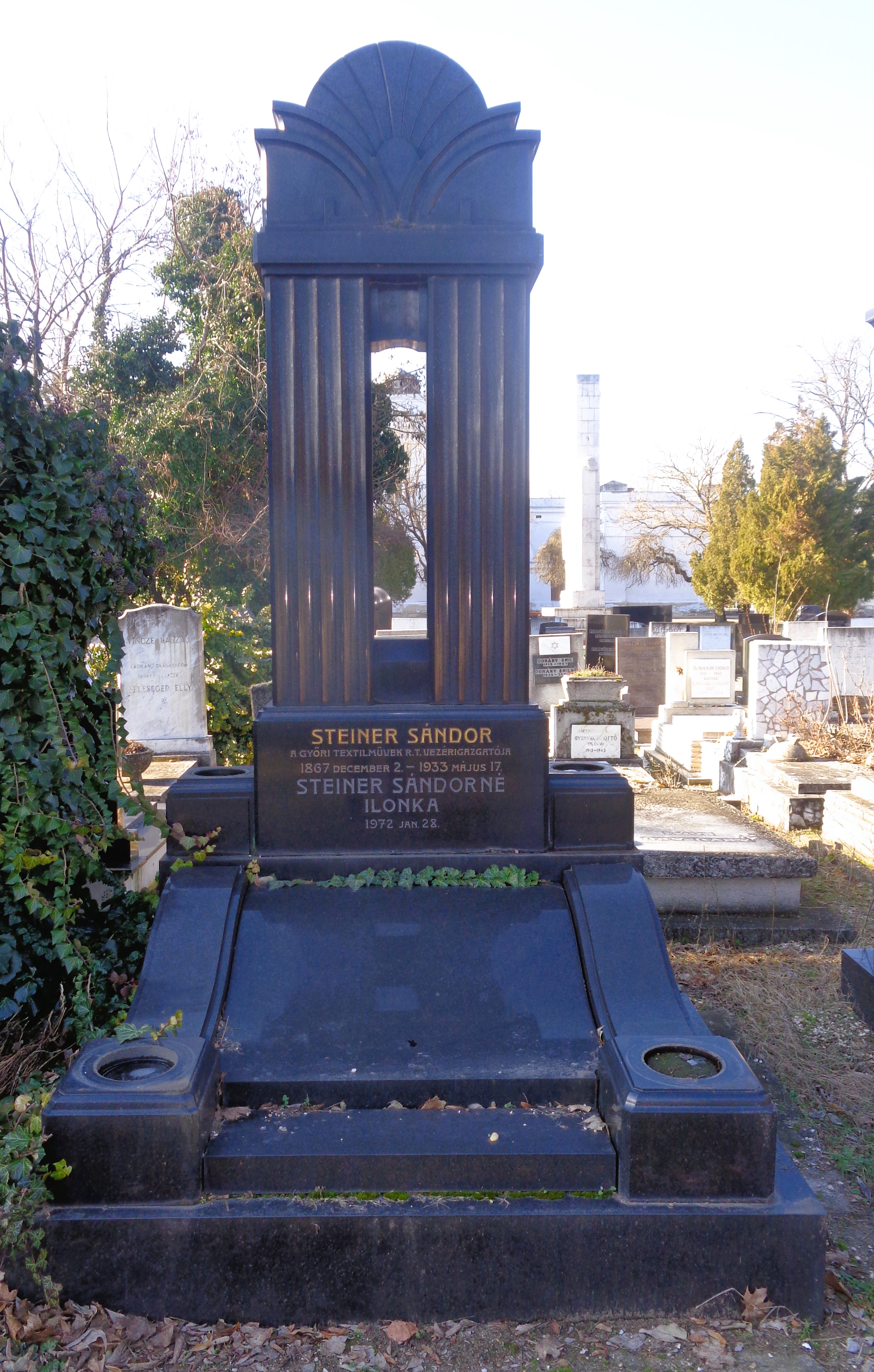
