= Jewish cemetery, Währing =

Coordinates: 48°13′57″N 16°21′04″E

Jewish cemetery in Währing
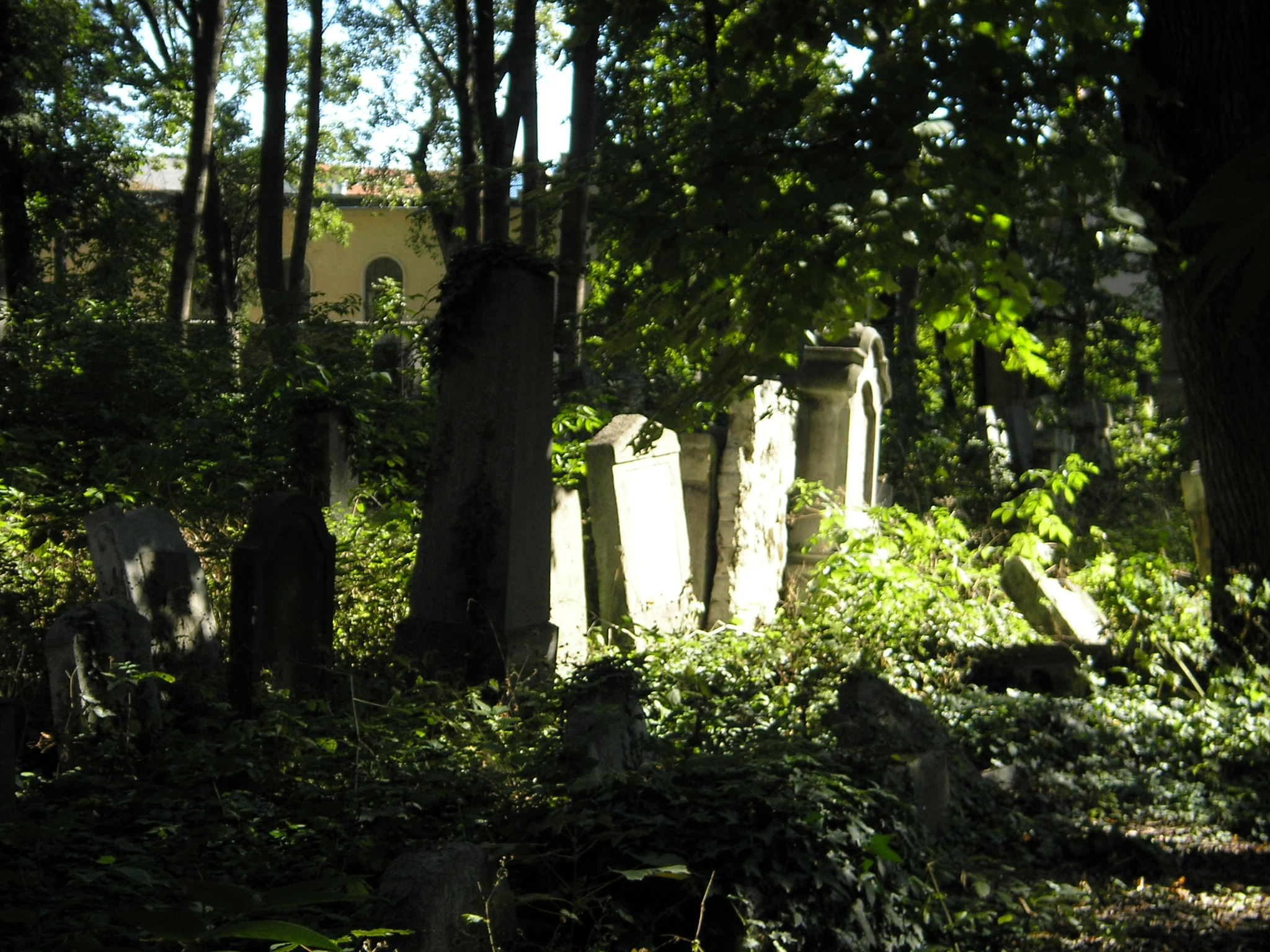
- Jewish cemetery in Währing
- Interactive map of Jewish cemetery in Währing

Details
- Established: 1784
- Location: Döbling, Vienna
- Country: Austria
- Type: Jewish (closed)
- Style: Biedermeier
- No. of graves: 5,800 – 7,300

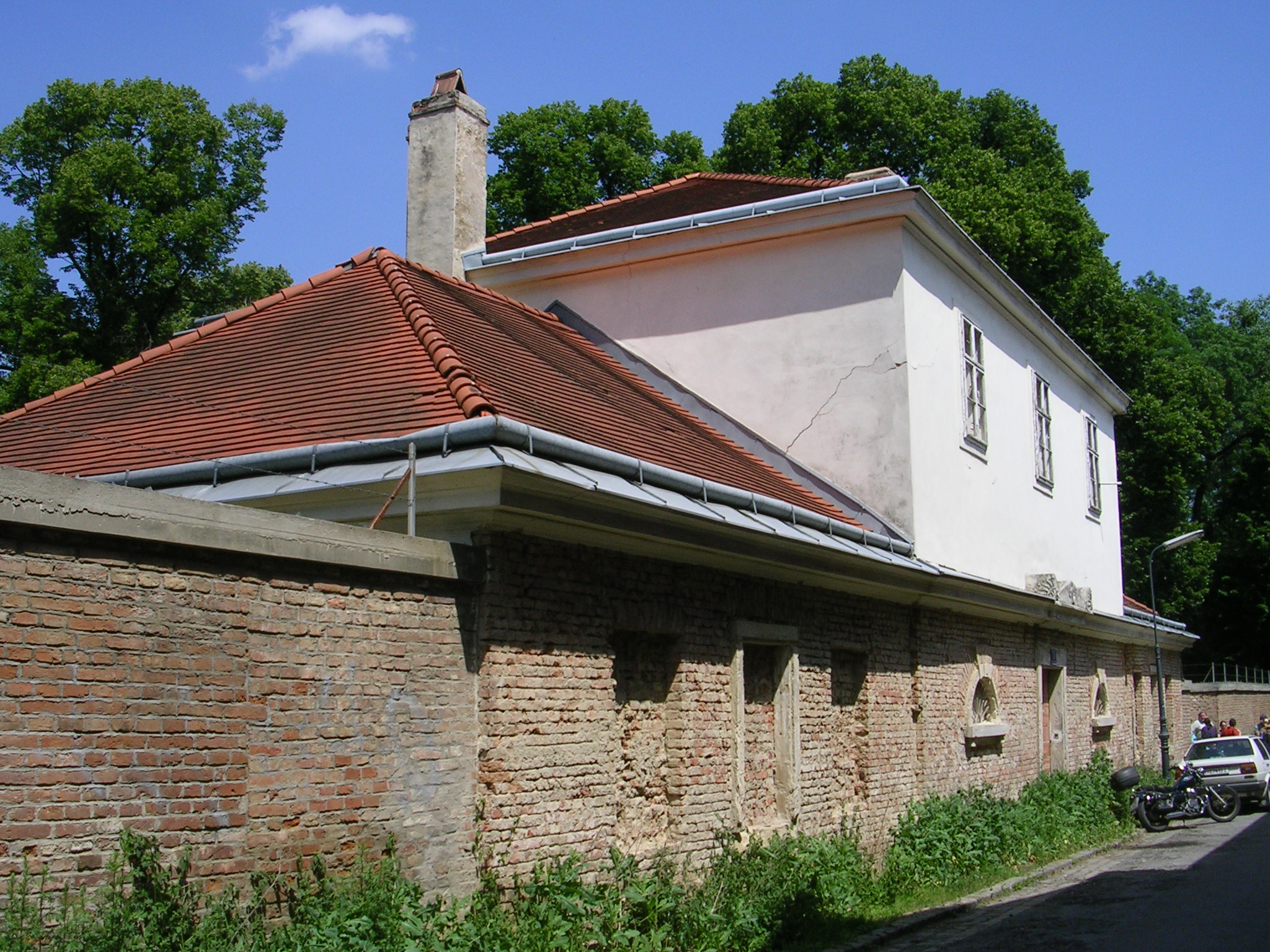
Funerary hall at the entrance (2006)

The Jewish Cemetery (German: Jüdische Friedhof) in Währing, opened in 1784, was the main burial site for members of the Israelitische Kultusgemeinde Wien. Besides the St. Marx Cemetery it is the last remaining cemetery of Vienna in the Biedermeier style. After its closure in the 1880s, it was partially destroyed during the time of the Third Reich, and is now only partly accessible due to its deteriorating condition. A long-running debate over the restoration of the cemetery has been taking place since 2006 between politicians of the federal and local levels as well as experts.

== Location ==
Originally the cemetery was part of the Viennese suburb of Währing. Today, however, due to boundary changes, the cemetery, despite its name, is no longer part of the 18th Vienna district of Währing, but belongs to Döbling, the 19th district. The entry is at No 3 Schrottenbachgasse.

== History ==
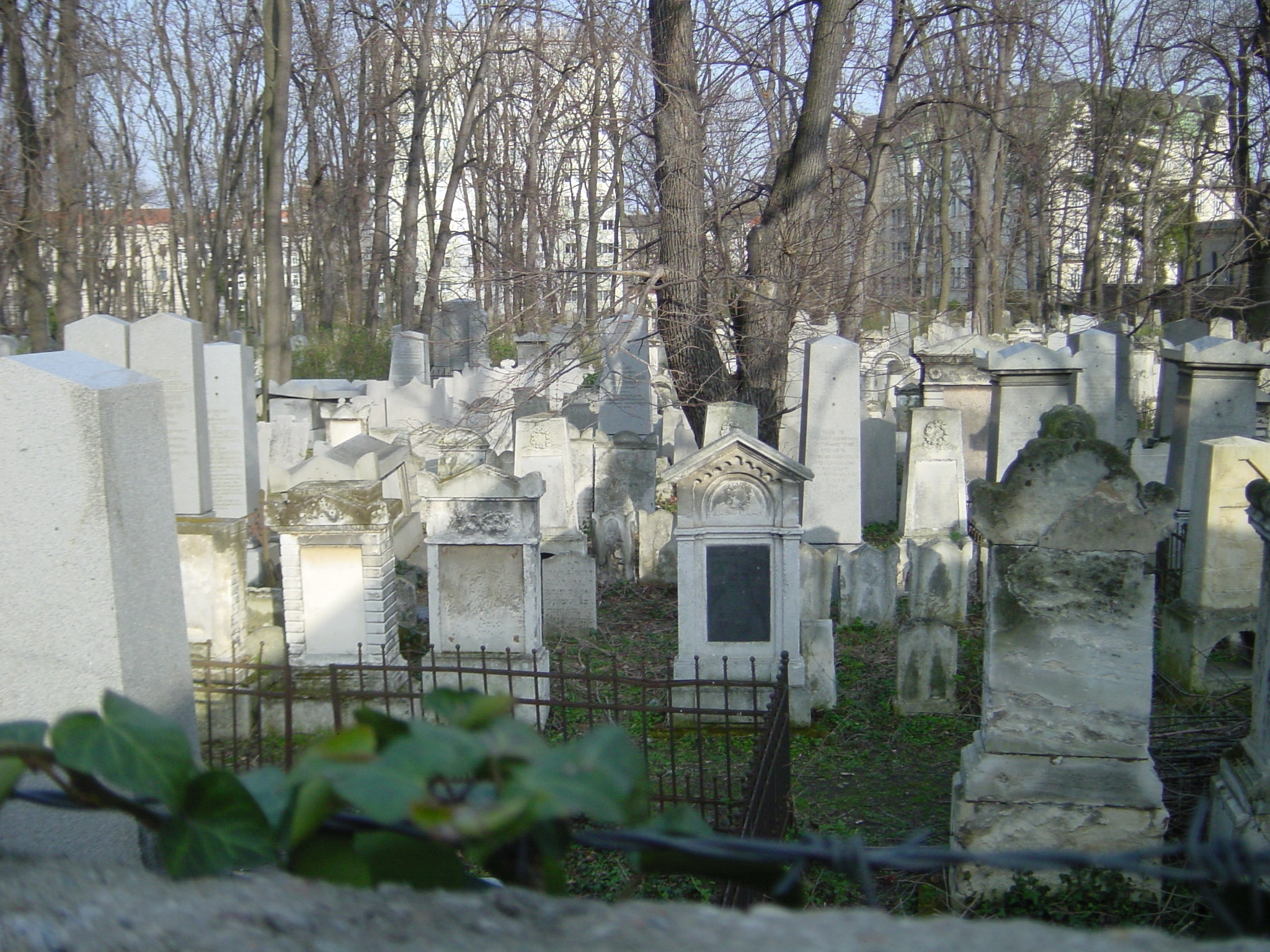
The cemetery in Währing as seen from Währing Park

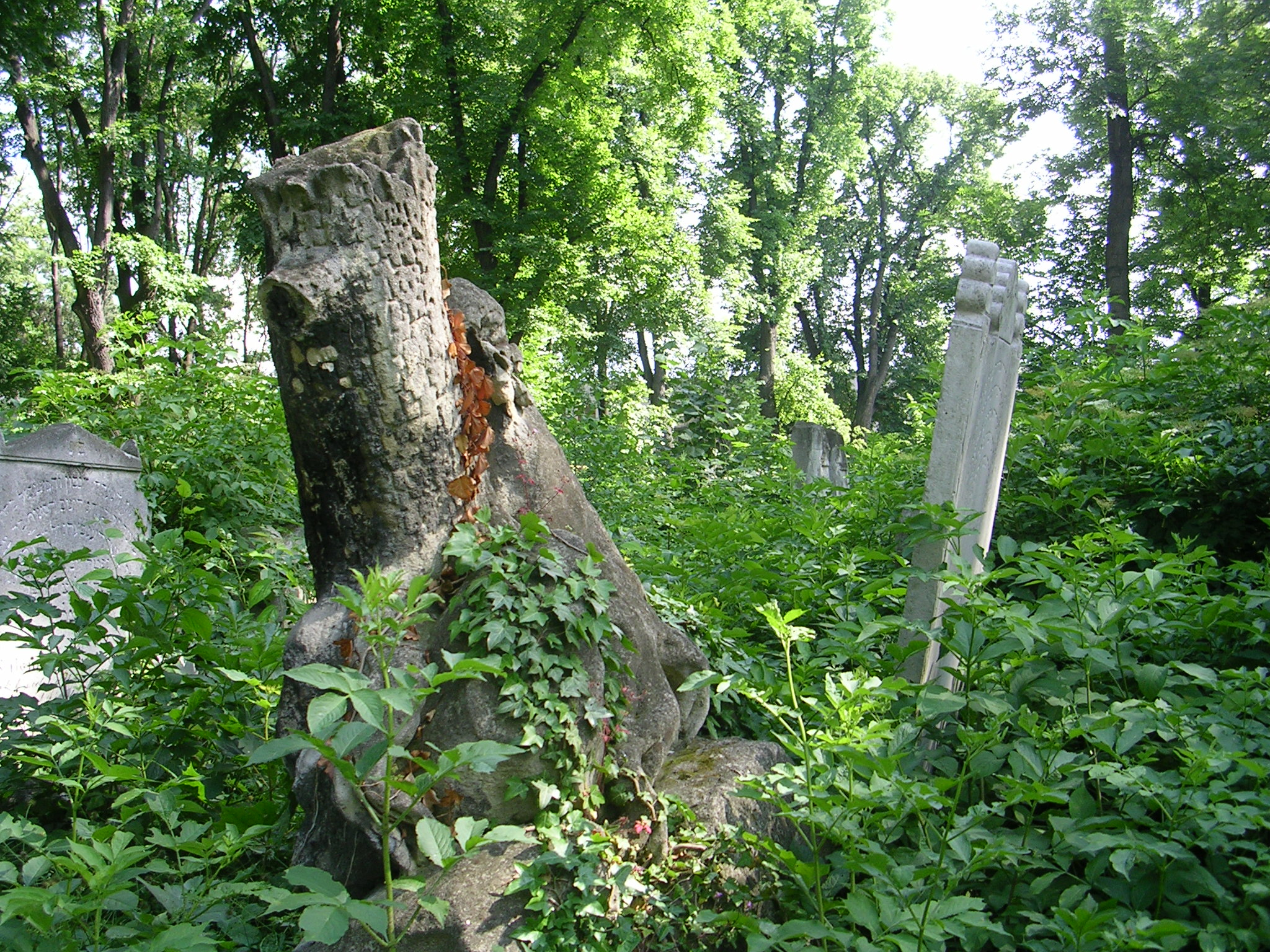
Tombstone in the shape of a rootstock

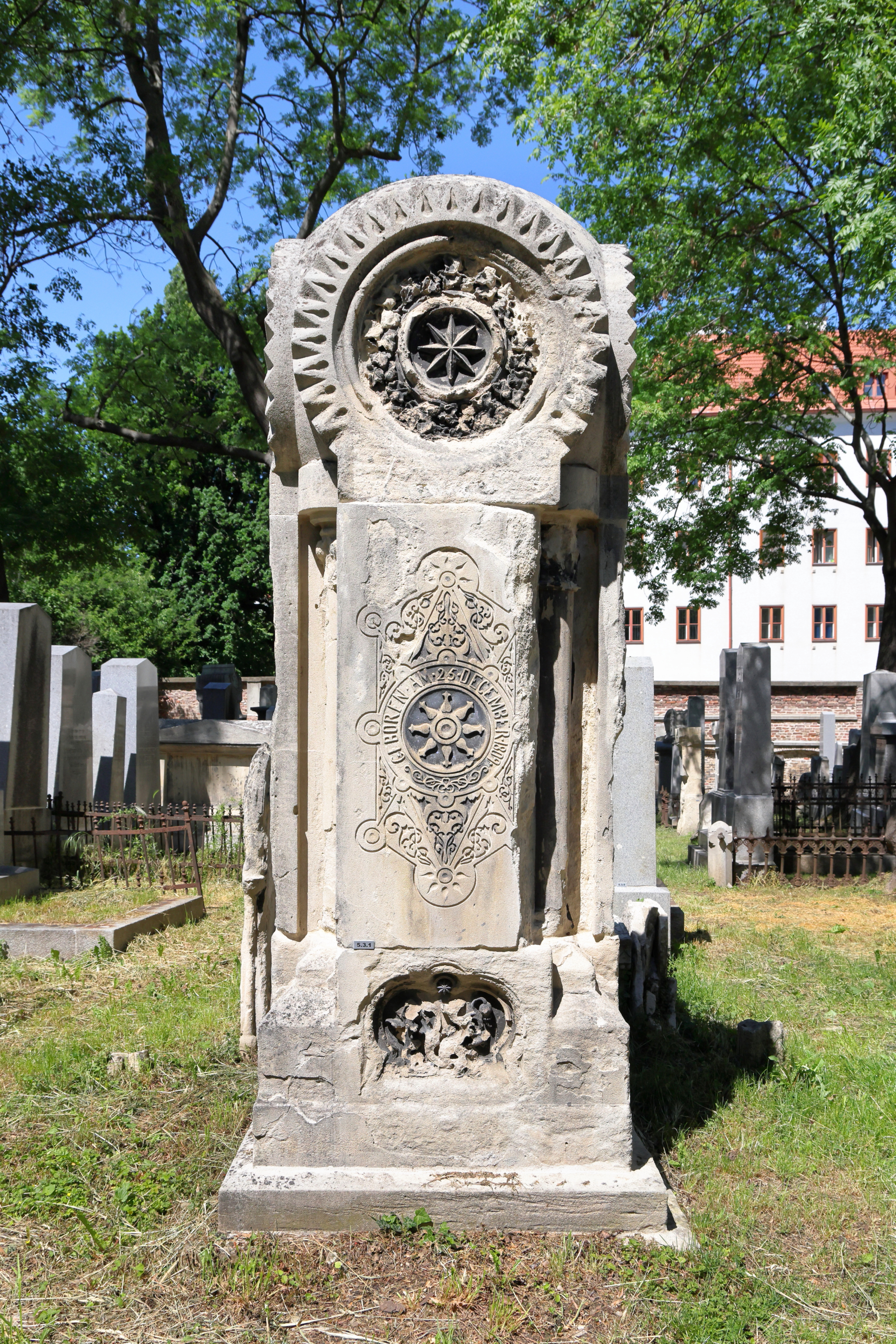
Stele at the grave of Regine Lichtenstern

Due to the sanitation ordinance of the Holy Roman Emperor Joseph II, every graveyard in Vienna within the city walls had to be closed. In place of the old local graveyards that had developed around the parish churches, new graveyards were constructed outside the city walls. The Jewish community was also affected by this measure, as they maintained a cemetery in the Seegasse (Roßau). This cemetery was closed. For this reason, in 1784 the Jewish community acquired a 2-hectare plot of land next to the newly constructed General Cemetery of Währing; there, in the same year, they opened the new Jewish cemetery, demarcated by a wall. Originally, the cemetery consisted only of the part to the west of the entrance; however, it was twice expanded towards the east through the purchase of more land. Until the completion of the Jewish part of the Zentralfriedhof in 1879 approximately 8000 to 9000 graves were constructed here. Unlike at the Jewish cemetery in Roßau, where only Hebrew inscriptions may be found, in the Währing cemetery gravestones with Hebrew as well as German writing exist. A last few, occasional burials took place in the family vaults in the late 1880s. After that, no more burials took place at the cemetery. Around 1900 an avenue of lime trees was planted in the middle of the unused cemetery. This is a sign of how liberal the Jewish community in Vienna at the time was, as lime trees planted next to priests' graves are supposed to dissolve the separation between these graves and the surrounding graves in the traditional Jewish mindset.

The neighbouring General Währing Cemetery (Allgemeiner Währinger Friedhof) was broken up in the 1920s and turned into the Währingerpark. The Jewish Cemetery, on the other hand, was left standing due to the Jewish laws regarding consecrated ground. In the Nazi period, a substantial portion of the cemetery was however destroyed. Approximately 1,500–2,000 graves were destroyed through excavation work for a fire protection pond that was never constructed. The congregation exhumed the affected graves so far as possible beforehand, and transported the remains to the Zentralfriedhof after the large-scale organising of trucks and fuel, where they were buried in a mass grave. The excavation material for the pond was used for building work at the Urban-Loritz-Platz. The remains of a further 200 dead were brought to the Naturhistorisches Museum of Vienna by the Nazis for analysis and research in the field of "racial studies". The remains were later likewise interred at the Zentralfriedhof. In 1942 there followed the expropriation of the whole plot of land; the Jewish community was forced to sell the cemetery to the city. After the premises of the cemetery were declared a bird sanctuary by a courageous city civil servant, at least the remaining land could be preserved.

After World War II the cemetery was returned to the Jewish Kultusgemeinde after tough negotiations, but the destroyed part had to be given to the city in exchange. Thereupon, the city decided to develop the plot of land that had been cheaply acquired as grassland; it then constructed the "Arthur Schnitzler-Hof", a Plattenbau from the 1960s. Meanwhile, the rapid deterioration of the cemetery began, as the Jewish Kultusgemeinde could not afford to preserve it. Even after the Republic of Austria obliged itself in 2001, in the Washington Agreement, to render assistance for the preservation and restoration of Jewish cemeteries, no steps were taken towards the preservation of this cemetery. The Republic of Austria's payments to the Jewish Kultusgemeinde for the upkeep of Jewish cemeteries are used for the preservation of the two Jewish sections of the Zentralfriedhof, and as such, there are hardly any funds available for the maintenance of the Jewish Cemetery in Währing. Even after the declaration by the Vienna Restitution Commissioner Kurt Scholz that usage of the site as a park would be enabled, only a few rotten trees were felled. Following calls by the Vienna Greens for a clean-up of the cemetery, at the end of February 2006 the city councillor responsible for city finances at the time, Sepp Rieder (Social Democratic Party), suggested as a solution a foundation, in which the federation, the city and private donors would have a stake. However, in June 2006 the mayor, Michael Häupl, called on the federal government to pay for the repairs, describing any possible contribution on the part of the states as a "voluntary contribution" at most. Concrete steps were therefore not taken. As no further maintenance of the tree population was undertaken, further gravestones were destroyed through wind damage (see Kyrill (storm)). In early 2007, the Jewish Kultusgemeinde estimated the cost of repairing the cemetery at 14 million euros and planned to turn the caretaker's house into a meeting house. In January 2007, along with the Educult institute, the Jewish Kultusgemeinde started an initiative that envisaged the publishing of a book and a photo calendar, as well as an exhibition, that would contribute to restoring the property. In addition, the until then irregular guided tours of the cemetery are now offered on a monthly basis. On 2 March 2007, the Social Democratic Party (SPÖ) and the Austrian People's Party (ÖVP) finally agreed to a proposal by the Greens in the city council, that the "worst dangers and damages" on the cemetery should be cleared by the city of Vienna through the city's horticultural agency. To be able to restore and preserve the property long-term, however, the city of Vienna is relying heavily on the federation participating. The President of the National Council, Barbara Prammer, with a working group of representatives of the federation, federal states and local authorities, is planning the formulation of an all-Austrian solution.

== Cemetery composition and graves ==
=== Layout ===
If one enters the cemetery via the gate in the Schrottenbachgasse, to the left of the entrance just by the road one will find the building formerly used for the preparation of the deceased's body according to Jewish rites (see Tumah and taharah). It is an example of neoclassical architecture, built by Joseph Kornhäusel. The side facing the street has been bricked up, but for the most part the building is still well-preserved. The older part of the cemetery is to the left of the entrance; the avenue of lime trees separates this older part from the newer part that was acquired later. The older part contains the graves of historically relevant people such as Fanny von Arnstein and the Epstein family. The Sephardic section is located on both sides of the main avenue in the northern area. Along the main avenue itself are the priests' graves (Kohanim). In the newer portion of the cemetery, predominantly people from poorer backgrounds were buried; due to the cheaper materials these gravestones are made of, they have been much more severely affected by erosion. There is also a section here in which infants were buried, as well as mothers who died in childbirth. The family vaults of ennobled Jews, on the other hand, are located along the cemetery wall in the northern part.

=== Sephardic section ===
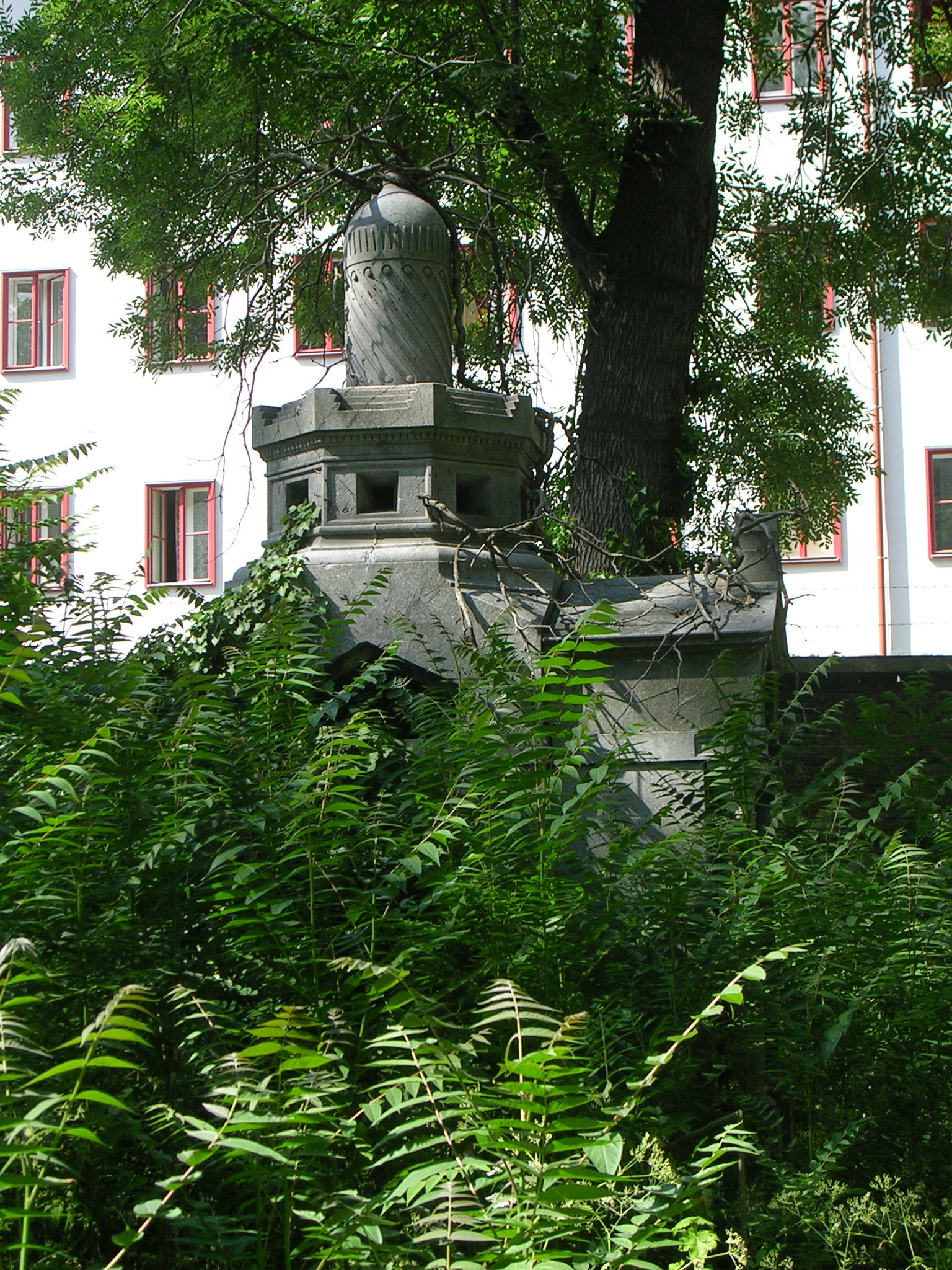
Tomb in the Sephardic section

In the 18th century Jews were in principle not allowed to reside in Vienna. However, the Sephardic Jews from the Ottoman Empire were an exception, who were allowed to reside there as Ottoman subjects under the Treaty of Passarowitz. Through the Sephardics, Vienna developed into an important centre of the oriental trade between the Ottoman Empire and the Sephardic communities of Amsterdam, Hamburg or Copenhagen. The relation of the Sephardic Jews with the Ottoman Empire is reflected in the tombs in the Jewish Cemetery in Währing. Alongside the oriental architecture and ornaments of the graves, the mausolea in particular have a significance that is unique for Central Europe.

=== Tombs of important figures ===
==== von Arnstein family ====
Baroness Fanny von Arnstein (1758–1818), the daughter of the Berlin rabbi and Court Jew Daniel Itzig. She married into a rich Viennese family of Court Jews. Fanny von Arnstein's husband, Nathan Adam Freiherr von Arnstein (1748–1838), also lies buried in the Jewish Cemetery. Her husband was a banker, wholesaler and diplomat who succeeded in obtaining the suspension of the residence restrictions on Jews.

The remains of Fanny von Arnstein were excavated by the Nazis and transferred to the Naturhistorisches Museum of Vienna for "scientific purposes", a fate that also befell several other graves. After that, the trail runs cold. To the present day, the Naturhistorisches Museum refuses to determine the location of the remains to return them to the cemetery.

==== Epstein-Teixeira de Matto family ====
In the tomb of the Epstein family lie the relatives of the businessman Gustav Ritter von Epstein (1827–1879). Gustav Ritter von Epstein was an important banker, who was connected amongst other things to the construction of the Northern Railway. In 1870 he constructed the Palais Epstein on the Ringstraße, but lost it in the stock market crash of 1873. He himself was not buried in this family tomb, but instead in the Jewish section of the Zentralfriedhof that was constructed 1877–1879.

==== Siegfried Philipp Wertheimber ====
The tomb of the well-known "tolerated" Jew Siegfried Philipp Wertheimber (1777–1836) is an important grave with pillars in the Egyptian style. Tolerated Jews were those Jews who were allowed to reside in Vienna through special permits. These special permits were made possible by the Edict of Tolerance of Joseph II. If a Jew had received such a special residence permit, many others in their household, if declared family members, could receive permission to live in Vienna. Households of tolerated Jews thus consisted of up to 200 people.

==== Königswarter family ====
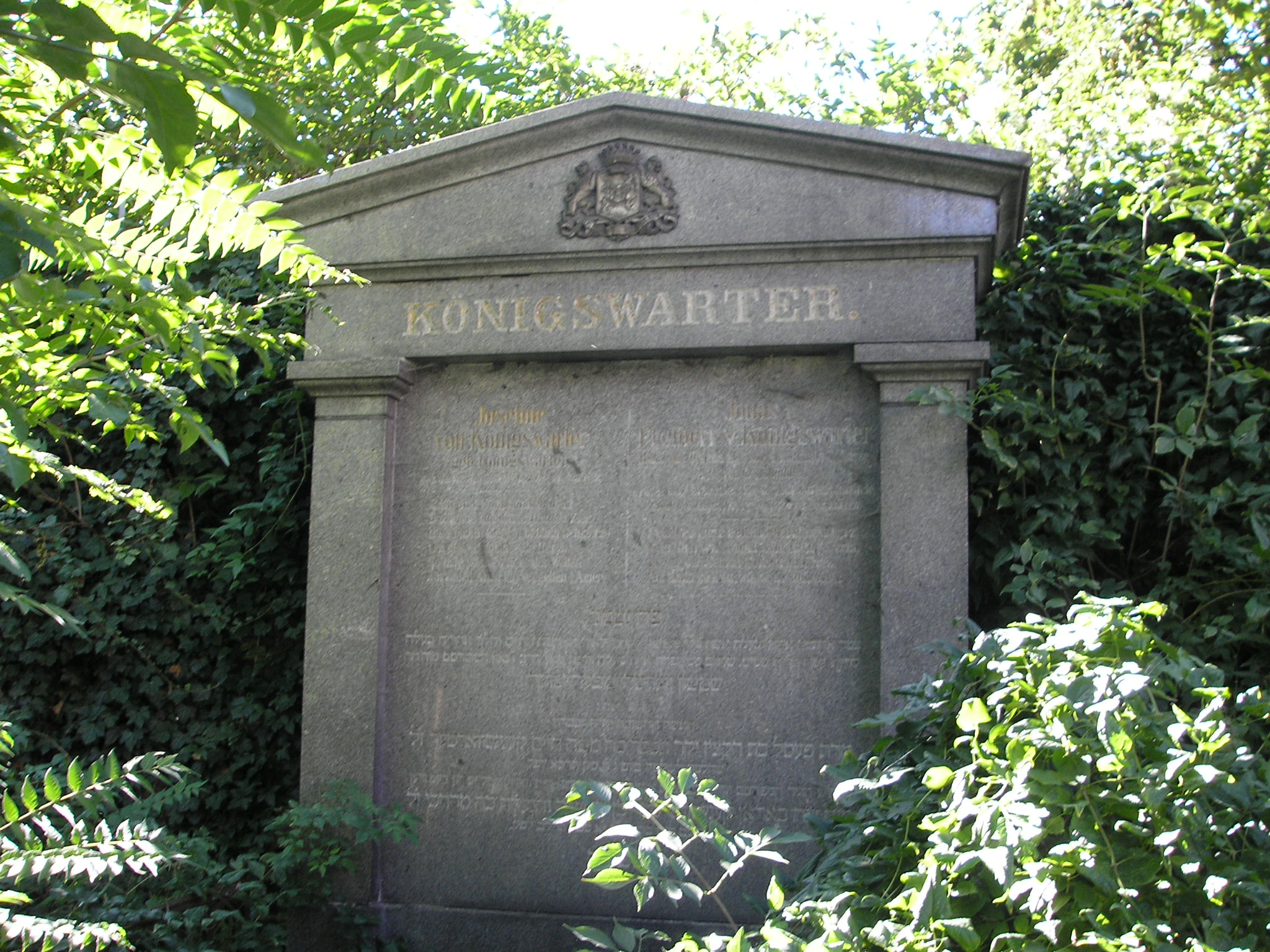
Tomb of the Königswarter family

The Königswarter family tomb contains the remains of the family of Jonas Freiherr von Königswarter (1807–1871). As a tolerated Jew, Königswarter bore the official title of "imperially-royally privileged" wholesale trader. Königswarter was a banker and president of the Vienna Kultusgemeinde. His wife Josefine (1811–1861) presided over the Jewish women's association.

==== Others ====
- Baron Bernhard von Eskeles (1753–1839), banker
- Isaak Löw Hofmann, Edler von Hofmannsthal (1759–1849), merchant
- Salomon Hermann Mosenthal (1821–1877), dramatist

== State of preservation ==
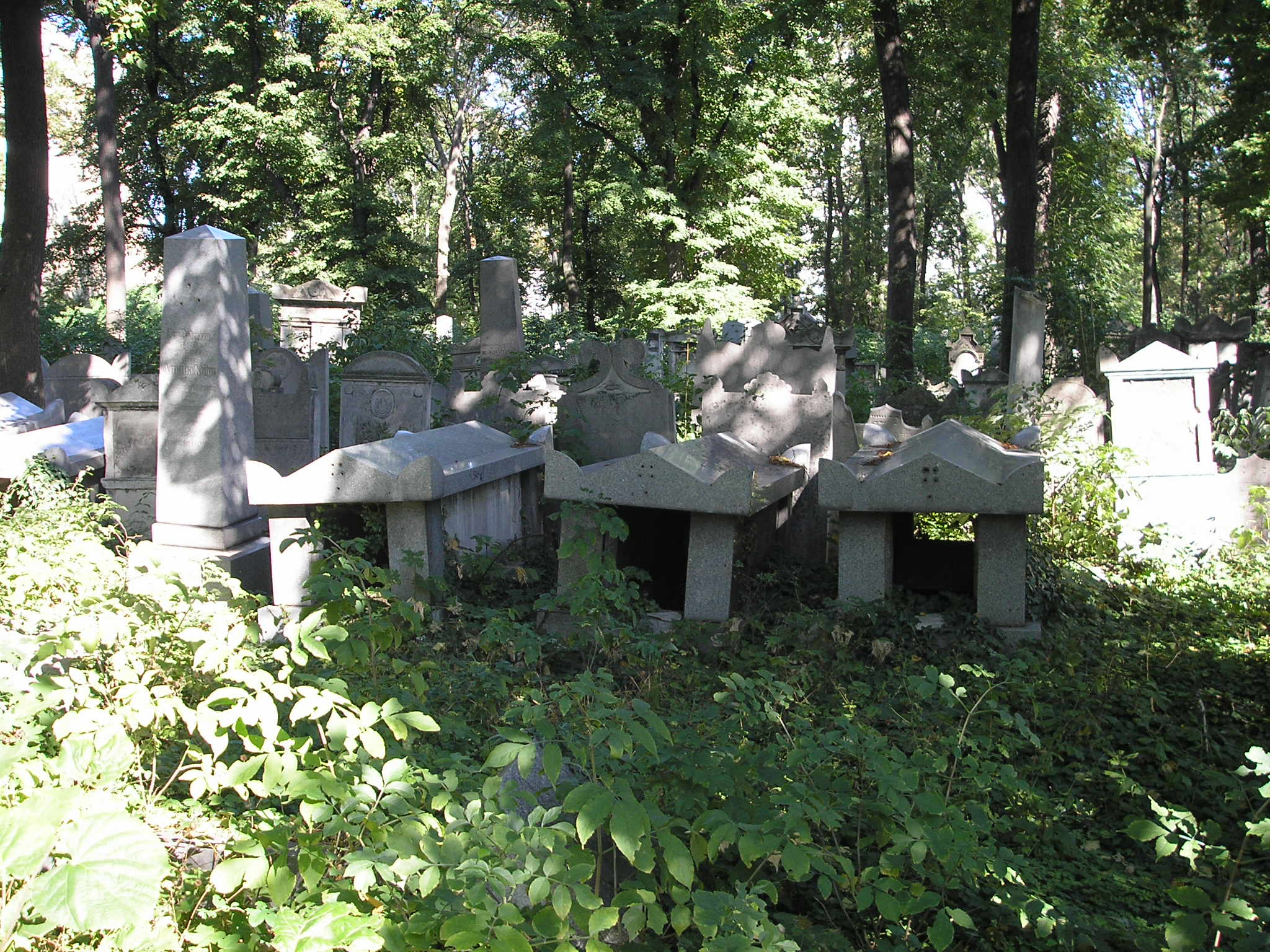
Damaged tombs of the Arnstein and Eskeles families (2006)

Since almost all the relatives of those who lie buried in the cemetery were killed in the Holocaust or had to emigrate, there is no-one left who can tend to the graves. Due to its limited funds, the Jewish Kultusgemeinde is also unable to contribute significantly to the preservation. Since no or hardly any resources have been made available for its upkeep by the city of Vienna and the Austrian government, the cemetery is in a state of extreme disrepair. Due to the overaged tree population and burial vaults partly standing open, visiting the cemetery is currently only possible after signing a liability waiver with the Kultusgemeinde. The president of the Jewish Kultusgemeinde, Ariel Muzicant, and Scholz, the commissioner for restitution, calculated the costs of providing safe access to the cemetery at €400 - 800,000. Apart from the trimming of the older trees, hardly any preservation measures have been taken in recent years. Parts of the cemetery have become inaccessible due to the strong growth of bushes and small trees. In addition, the growth of the roots from the trees has dislocated gravestones, some of which have fallen over. Gravestones continue to be damaged by falling trees or falling rotten branches. Additional severe damage appears on the graves from environmental factors such as acid rain, frost and vegetation. Extreme-rightwing smearings have also damaged gravestones, which was particularly destructive to sandstone surfaces. Due to this, the enclosure walls of the cemetery were secured by the Kultusgemeinde with barbed wire and embedded broken glass.
