= Bernhard Wachstein =

Viennese Jewish community historian and librarian

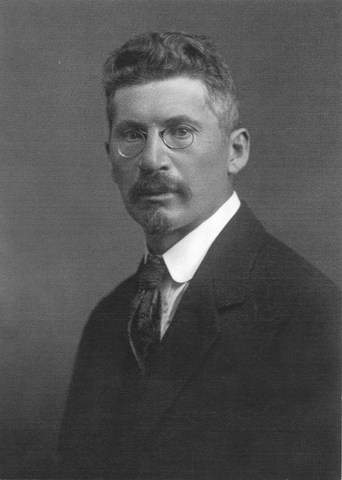
- Born: 31 January 1868; Tovste, Galicia
- Died: 15 January 1935 (aged 66); Vienna, Austria
- Occupations: Community historian and librarian
- Known for: Research into Austrian Jewish community

Bernhard Wachstein (31 January 1868 in Tluste, southeast Galicia – 15 January 1935 in Vienna) was a Jewish community historian and bibliographer who rebuilt, expanded, and modernized the library of the Israelitische Kultusgemeinde Wien (Vienna Israelite Community). He also performed important bibliographic work, particularly relating to the history of Austrian Jews.

== Life ==
After completing his Talmudic, philosophical, historical, and bibliographic studies, Bernhard Wachstein settled in Vienna and became a librarian for the Israelitische Kultusgemeinde Wien (Vienna Israelite Community). In 1919, after the death of Bernhard Münz, he became head librarian.

He was involved with community history and genealogy, and he made important contributions in these areas.

He married Marie (née Weiss) and they had two children Max Wachstein (b. 1905) and Sonia Wachstein (b. 1907).

== Selected writings ==
- Wiener hebräische Epitaphien, 1907
- Jüdische Privatbriefe aus dem Jahre 1619, Vienna and Leipzig 1911 (together with Alfred Landau)
- Die Gründung der Wiener Chewra Kadischa, 1911
- Katalog der Salo Cohn'schen Schenkungen, 2 volumes (Vienna: I. 1911, II. 1914)
- Die Inschriften des alten Judenfriedhofes in Wien, 2 volumes (Vienna/Leipzig: I. 1912; II. 1917)
- Hebräische Grabsteine aus dem XIII.-XV. Jahrhundert in Wien und Umgebung, Vienna 1916
- Die Grabinschriften des alten Judenfriedhofes in Eisenstadt (in: Eisenstädter Forschungen, Bd. I., published by Sándor Wolf, 1922)
- Zur Bibliographie der Gedächtnis- und Trauervorträge in der hebräischen Literatur, 3 volumes, Vienna 1922–30
- Die Juden in Eisenstadt, 2 volumes, 1926
- Beiträge zur Geschichte der Juden in Mähren (in: Juden und Judengemeinden Mährens, published by Hugo Gold, 1929)
- Die Hebräische Publizistik in Wien. In drei Teilen, Vienna 1930
- Bibliographie der Schriften Moritz Güdemanns, Vienna 1931
- Literatur über die jüdische Frau. Mit einem Anhang: Literatur über die Ehe, Vienna 1931
- Diskussionsschriften über die Judenfrage. Das neue Gesicht des Antisemitismus, Vienna 1933

== Literature ==
- Bibliographie der Schriften Bernhard Wachsteins, by Saul Chajes. Vienna 1933.
- Handbuch der historischen Buchbestände in Österreich, by Wilma Buchinger, Helmut W. Lang, Konstanze Mittendorfer, Österreichische Nationalbibliothek, Karen Kloth. Georg Olms Verlag, 1995
- Shoshana Duizend-Jensen: Jüdische Gemeinden, Vereine, Stiftungen und Fonds. Oldenbourg Wissenschaftsverlag, 2004.
