= Rákóczi Bridge =

Bridge in Budapest

Coordinates: 47°28′07″N 19°04′03″E

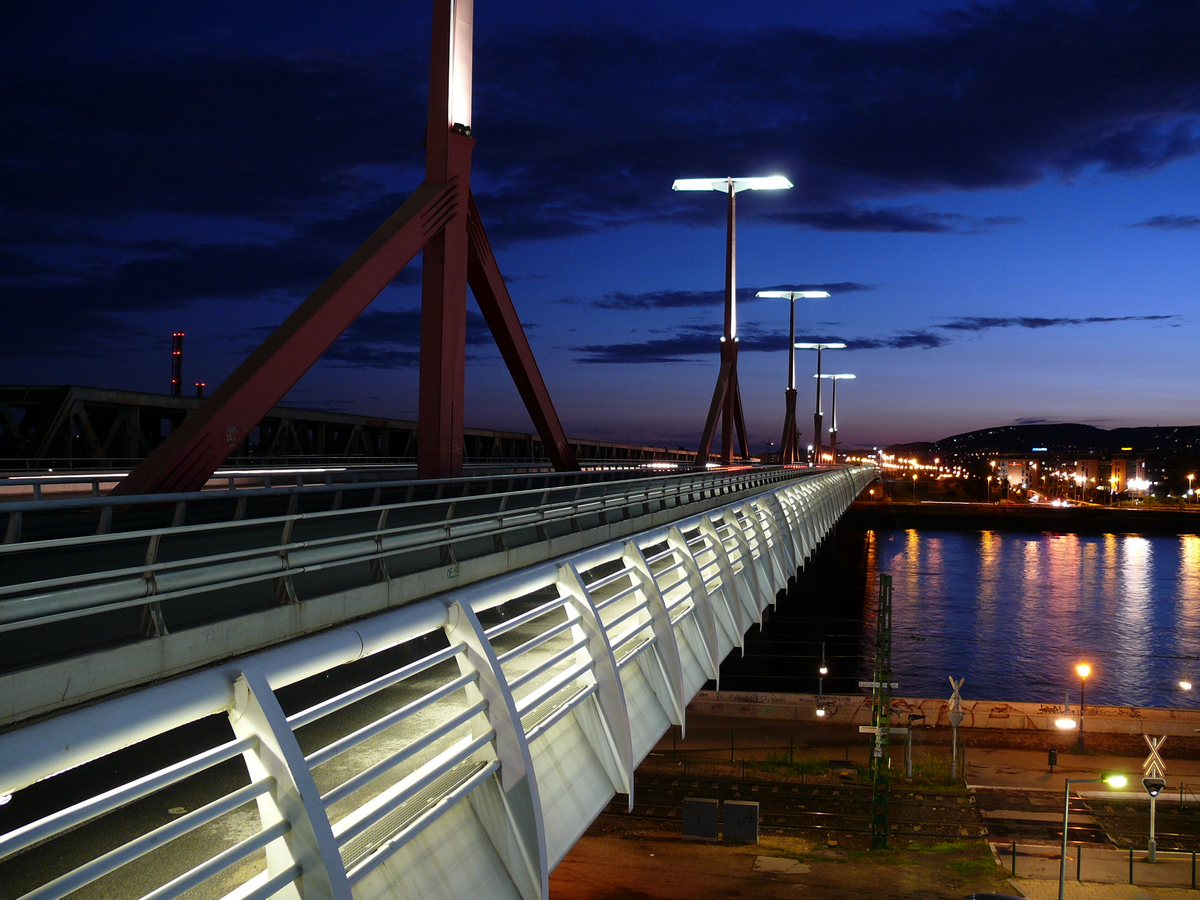
Rákóczi Bridge

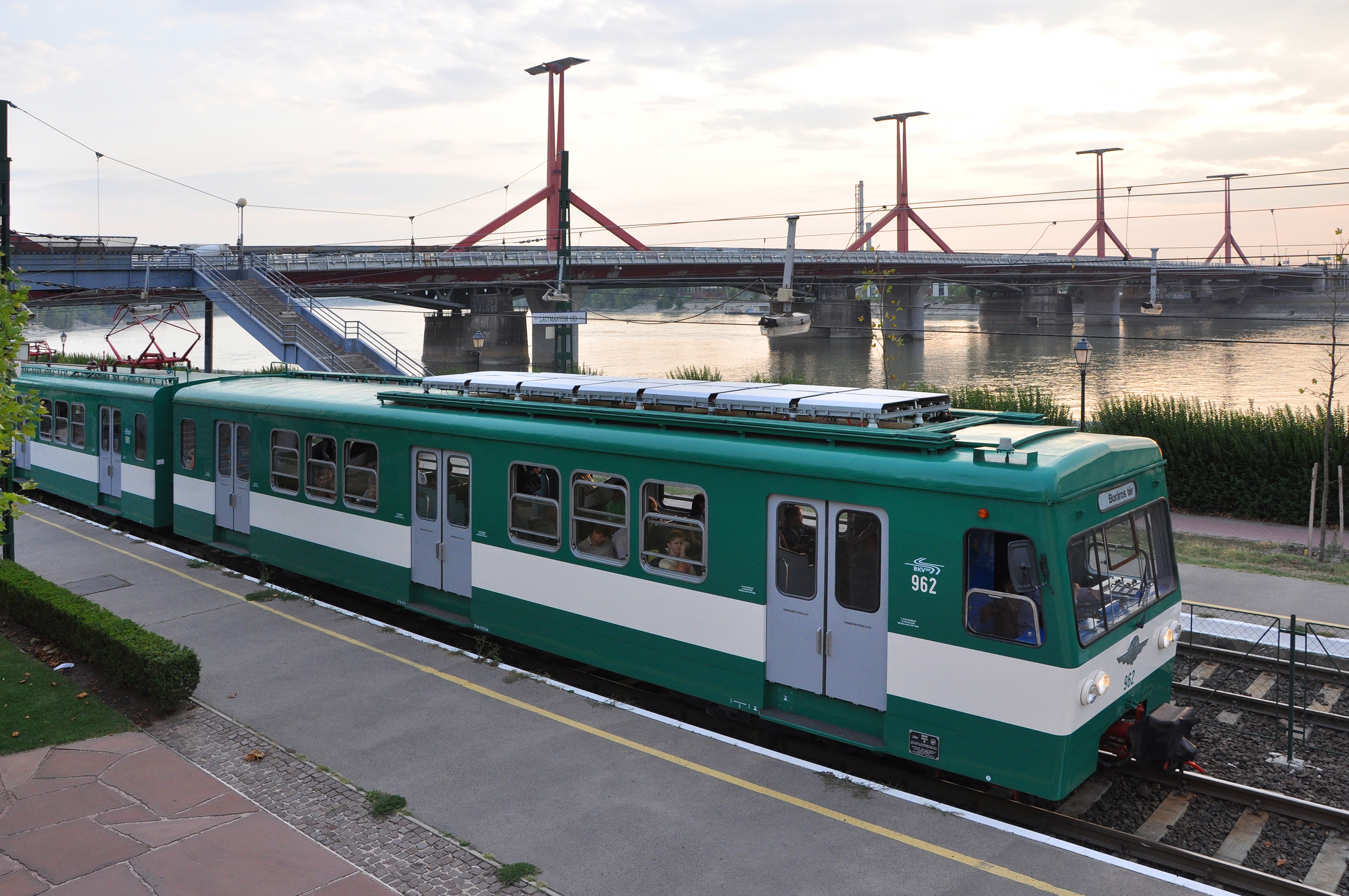
Müpa - Nemzeti Színház station on the Csepel HÉV line, with Rákóczi Bridge in the background

Rákóczi Bridge (Hungarian: Rákóczi híd, Hungarian pronunciation: [ˈraːkoːt͡si ˈhiːd], formerly known as Lágymányosi híd, Hungarian pronunciation: [ˈlaːɟmaːɲoʃi ˈhiːd], / Lágymányosi Bridge) is a bridge in Budapest, Hungary, connecting the settlements of Buda and Pest across the Danube. The construction of the steel girder bridge was started in 1992 to the plans of Tibor Sigrai.

It is named after the Rákóczi family, but is still more usually referred to as Lágymányosi híd. This bridge is the southernmost, and the second newest, public bridge in the capital; it was inaugurated in 1995.

Its Pest end is a station of Csepel HÉV, and the venue of the new Hungarian National Theatre (2002) and the Palace of Arts (2005).

== Tramline ==
The bridge had been designed to accommodate tram lines. The middle of the bridge was left empty for this, but the tracks were not laid out. The Reconstruction of the tram 1 and the bridge passage line section were built together. The bridge was planned to be reconstructed by January 2015, but the opening was delayed, due to the demands of the National Transport Authority. They required one more load test with 1000 tons and after that they opened the extended tram section.

== See also ==
- Erzsébet Bridge
- Liberty Bridge
- Margaret Bridge
- Petőfi Bridge
- Széchenyi Chain Bridge
- Bridges of Budapest
- List of crossings of the Danube River
