= Hubert Pál Álgyay =

Hungarian engineer

Hubert Pál Álgyay (Szeged, 6 June 1894 – Budapest, 27 August 1945) was a Hungarian engineer and lecturer.

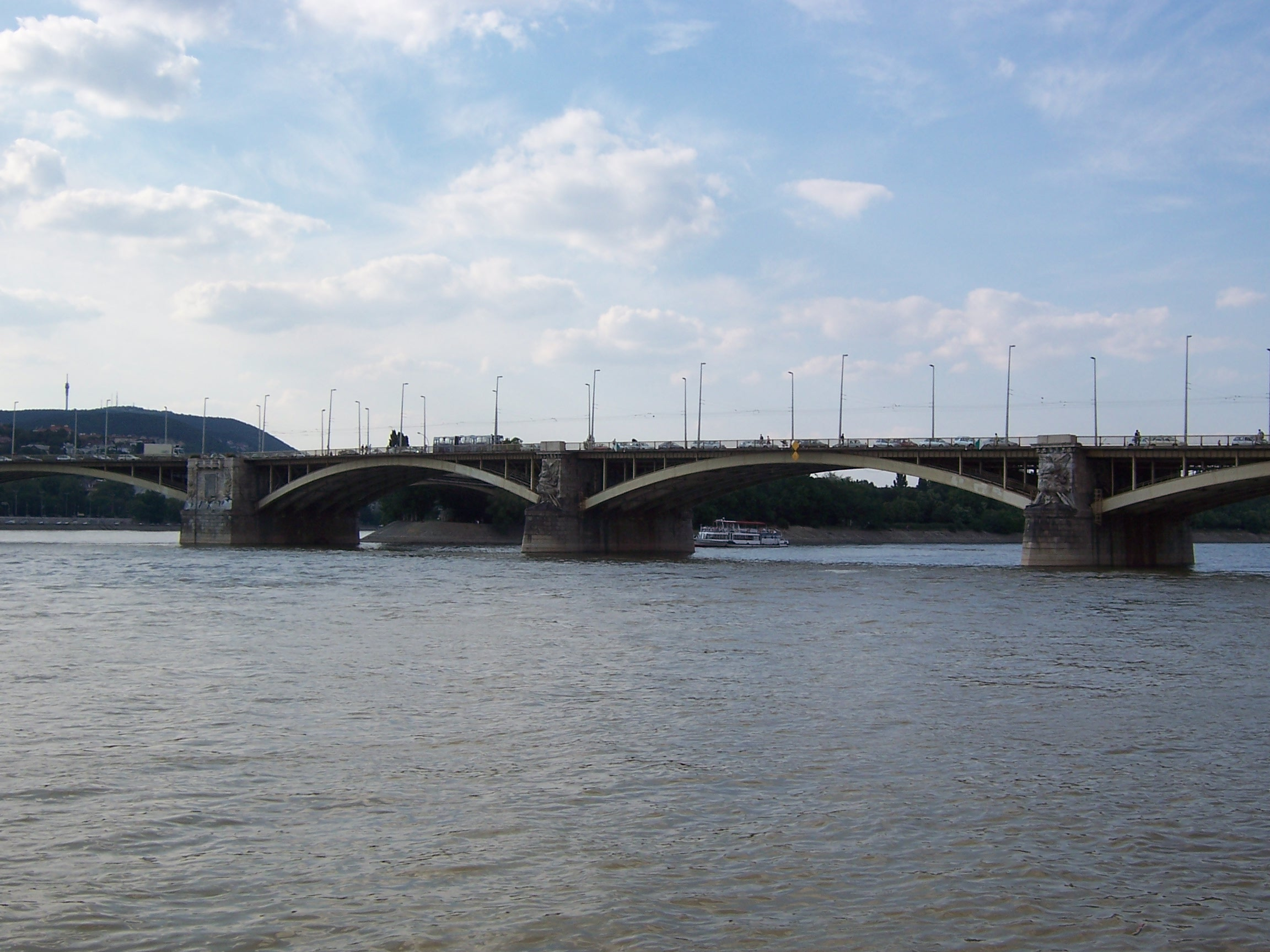
Margaret bridge in Budapest

Álgyay finished his studies at the Budapest Technical University and became adjunct lecturer in bridge building in 1924. Also in that year he completed a doctoral thesis. In 1926 he began work for the Ministry of Transport and from 1934 was director of the bridge building department there. Later he became state secretary of transport. He designed the Petőfi Bridge in Budapest (1933–37) and also directed the widening of Margaret Bridge. He was president of the Capitol building council between 1935 and 1937. He taught at the Technical University from 1937, becoming head lecturer in bridge building. His technical writing was also significant.
