= Bridges of Budapest =

List of bridges in the capital of Hungary

Coordinates: 47°29′48″N 19°02′27″E

The bridges of Budapest, Hungary, crossing the River Danube from north to south are as follows:

== Table of the most famous Bridges of Budapest ==
This table excludes rail bridges, bridges to islands and bridges that are partially outside of Budapest. The whole list of bridges of Budapest can be found below this table. The bridges are listed from north to south.

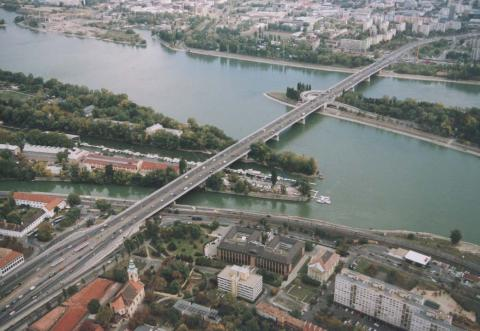
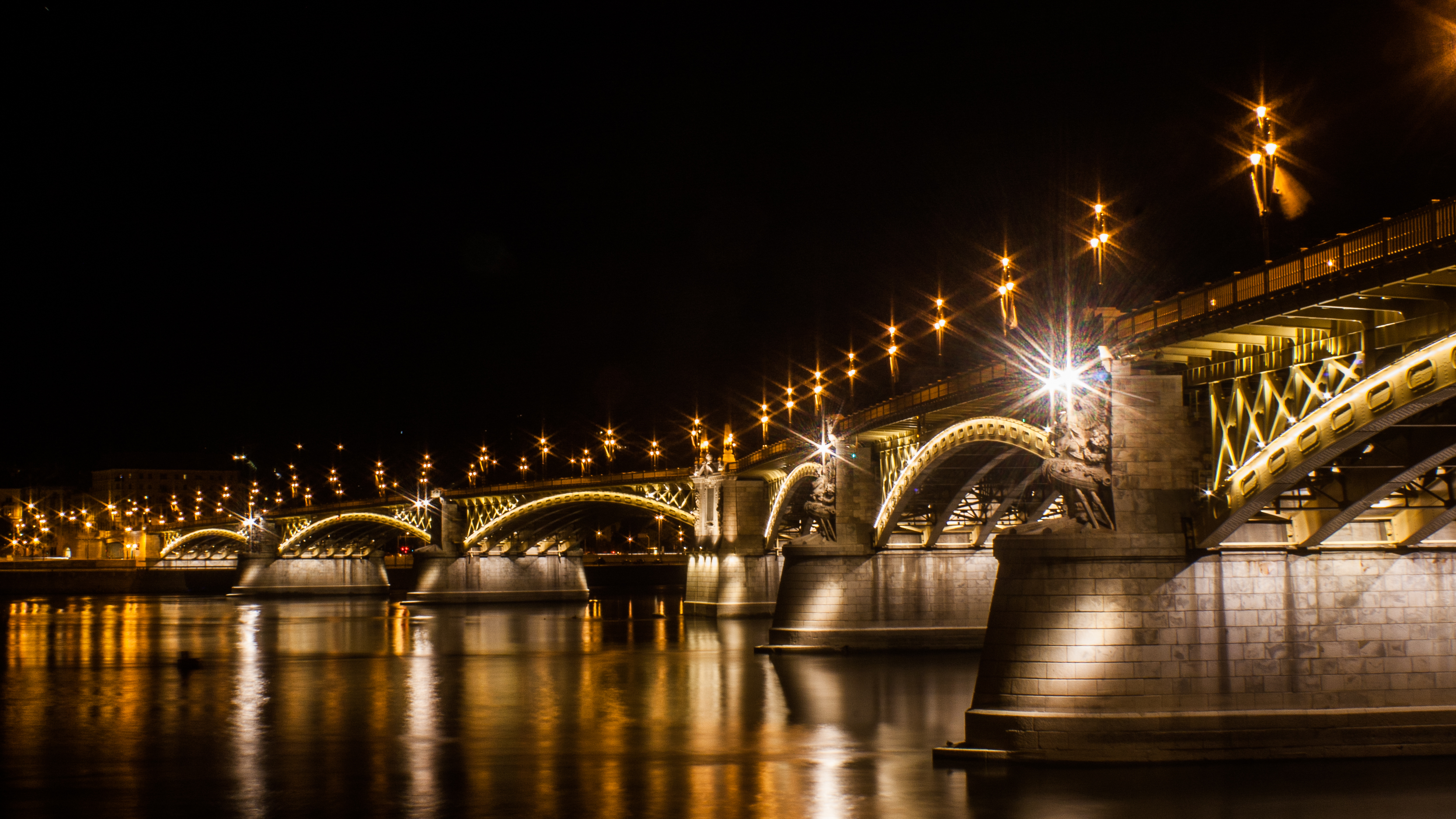
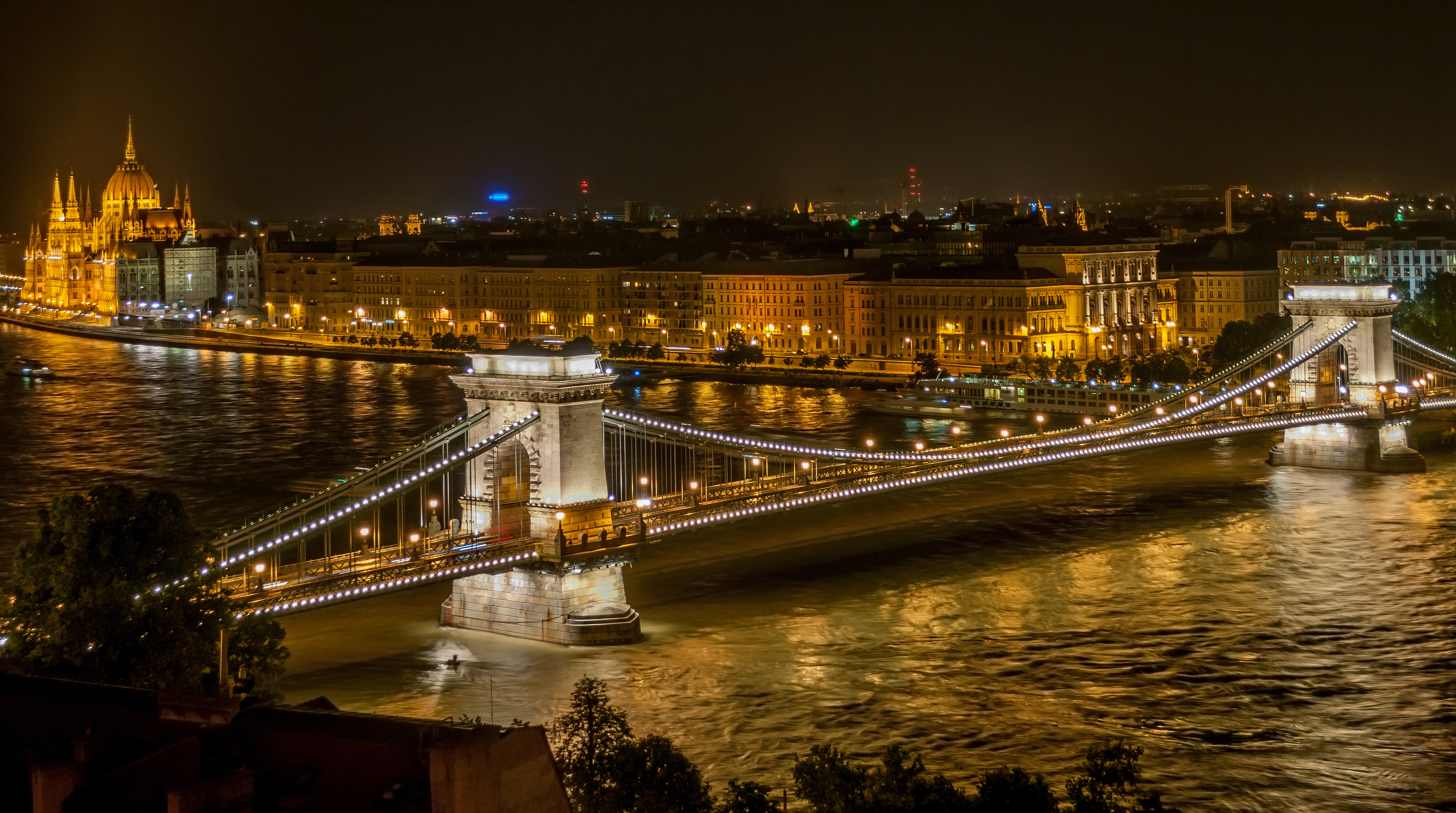
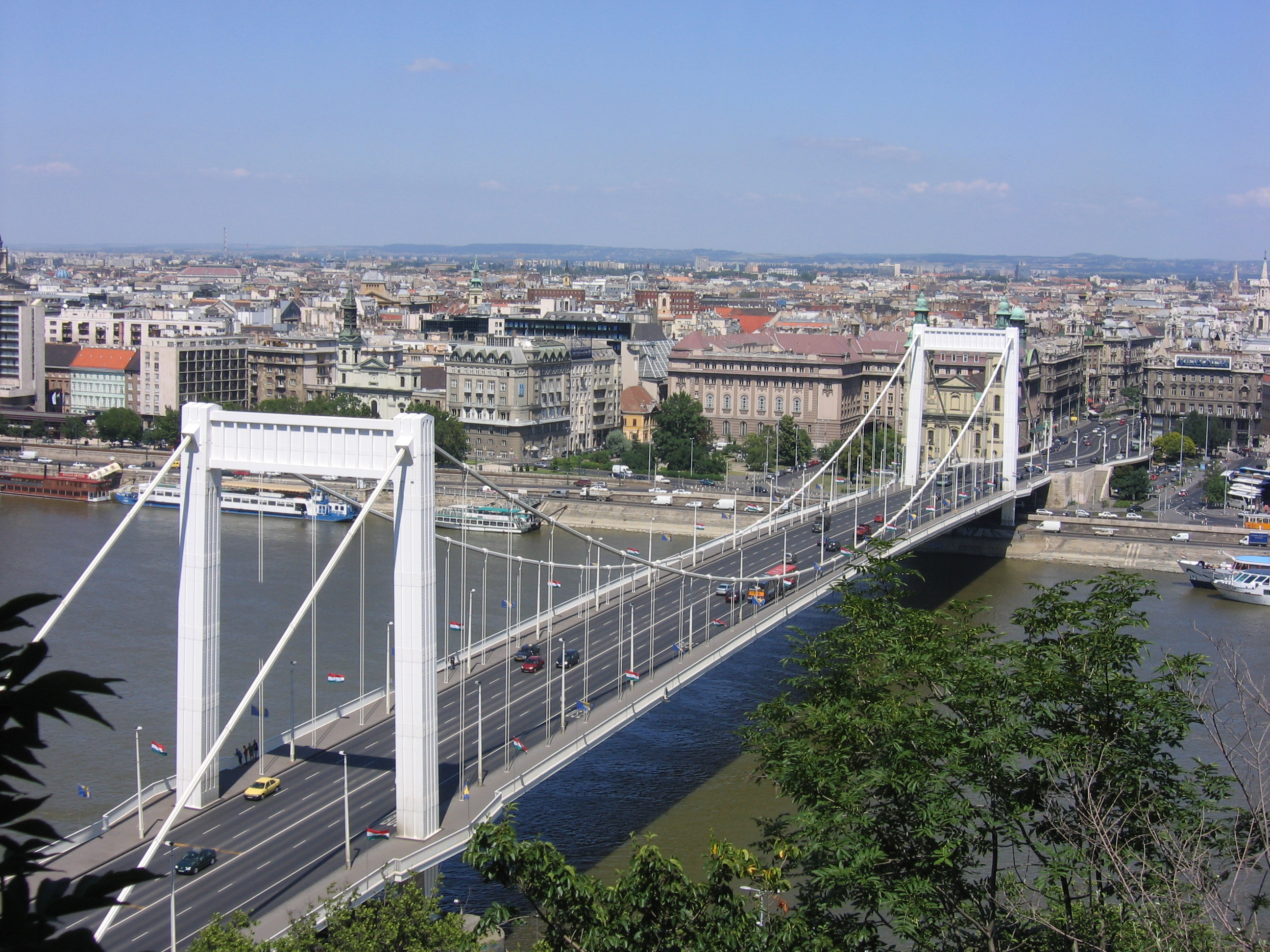
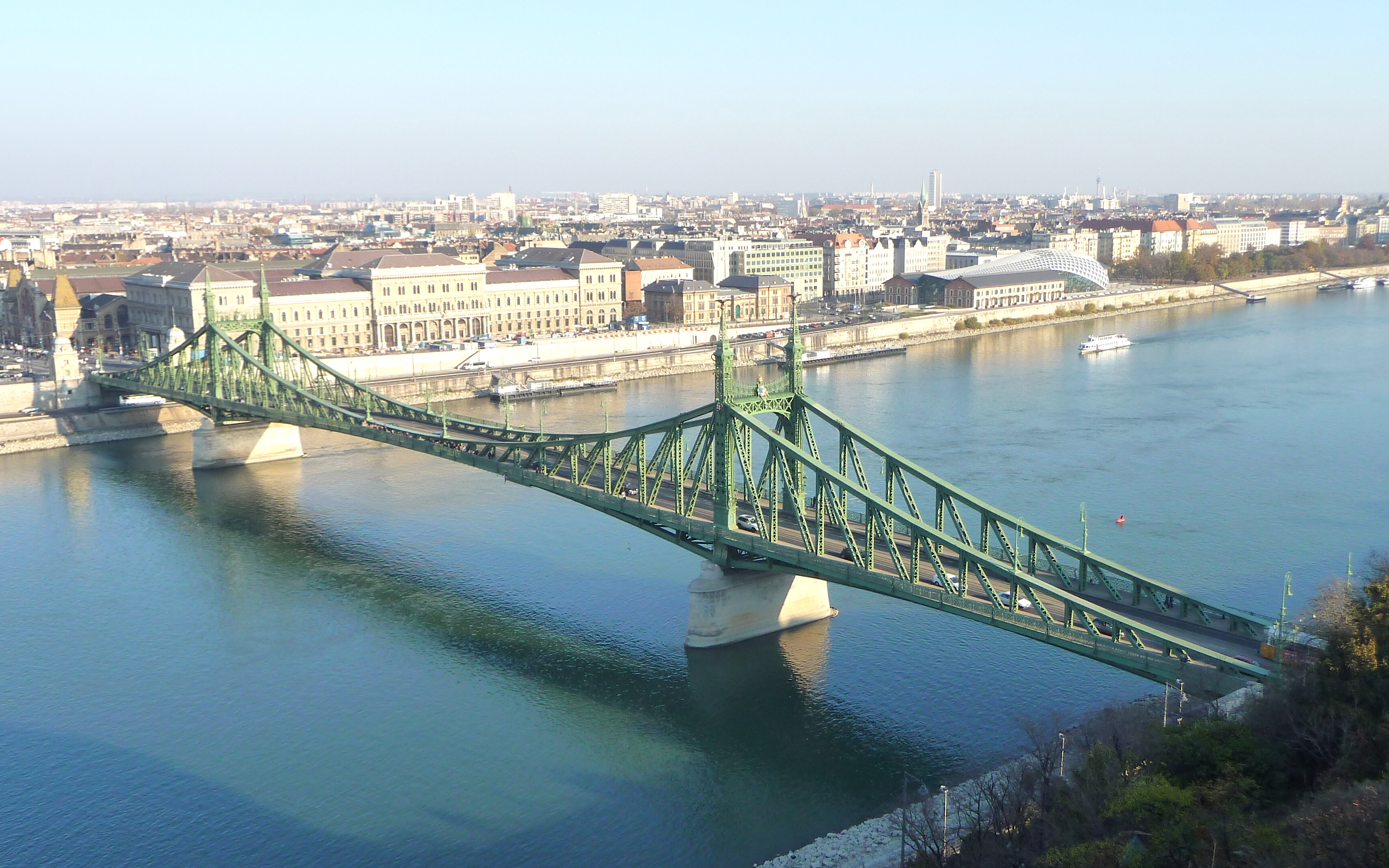
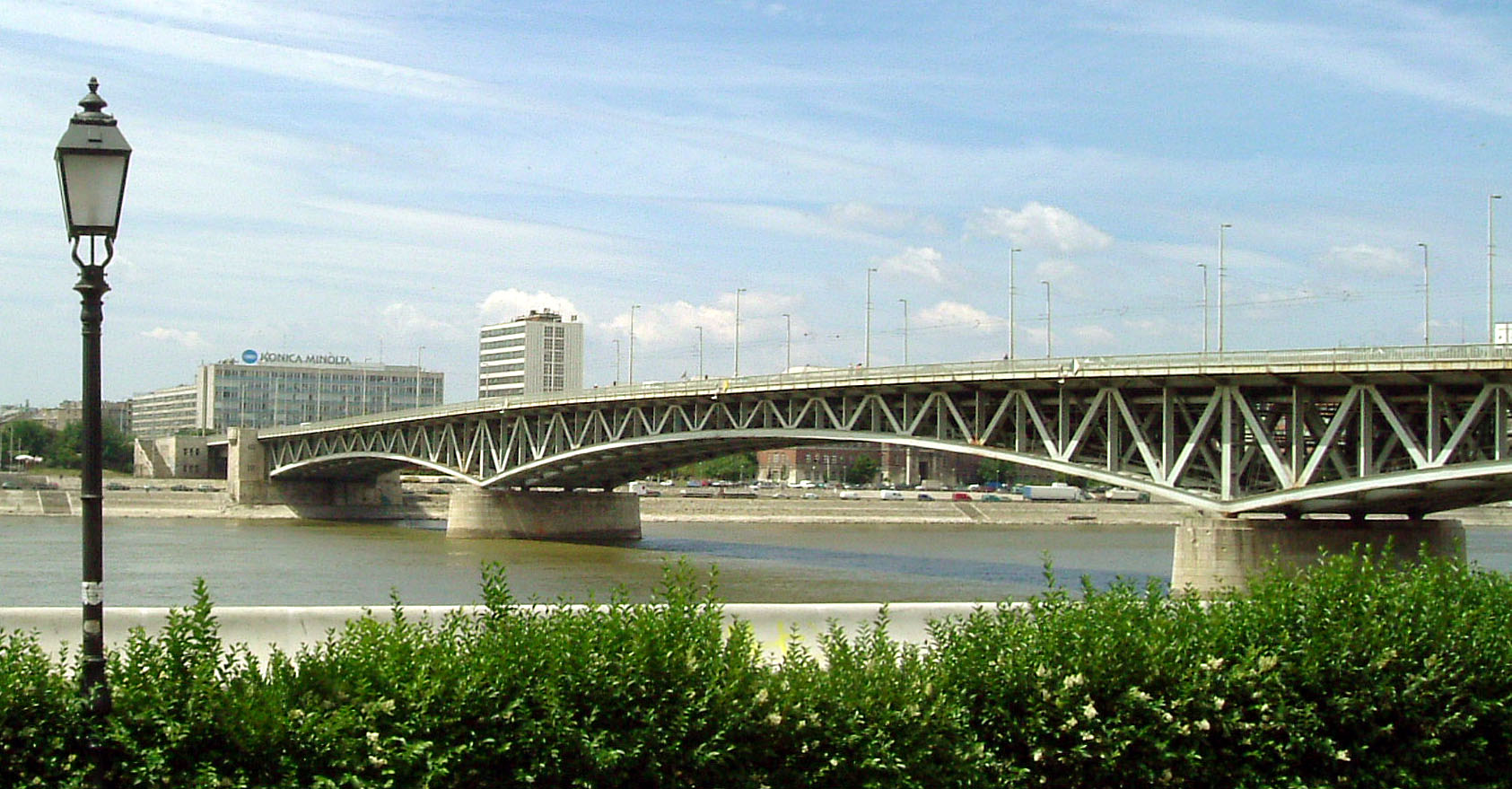
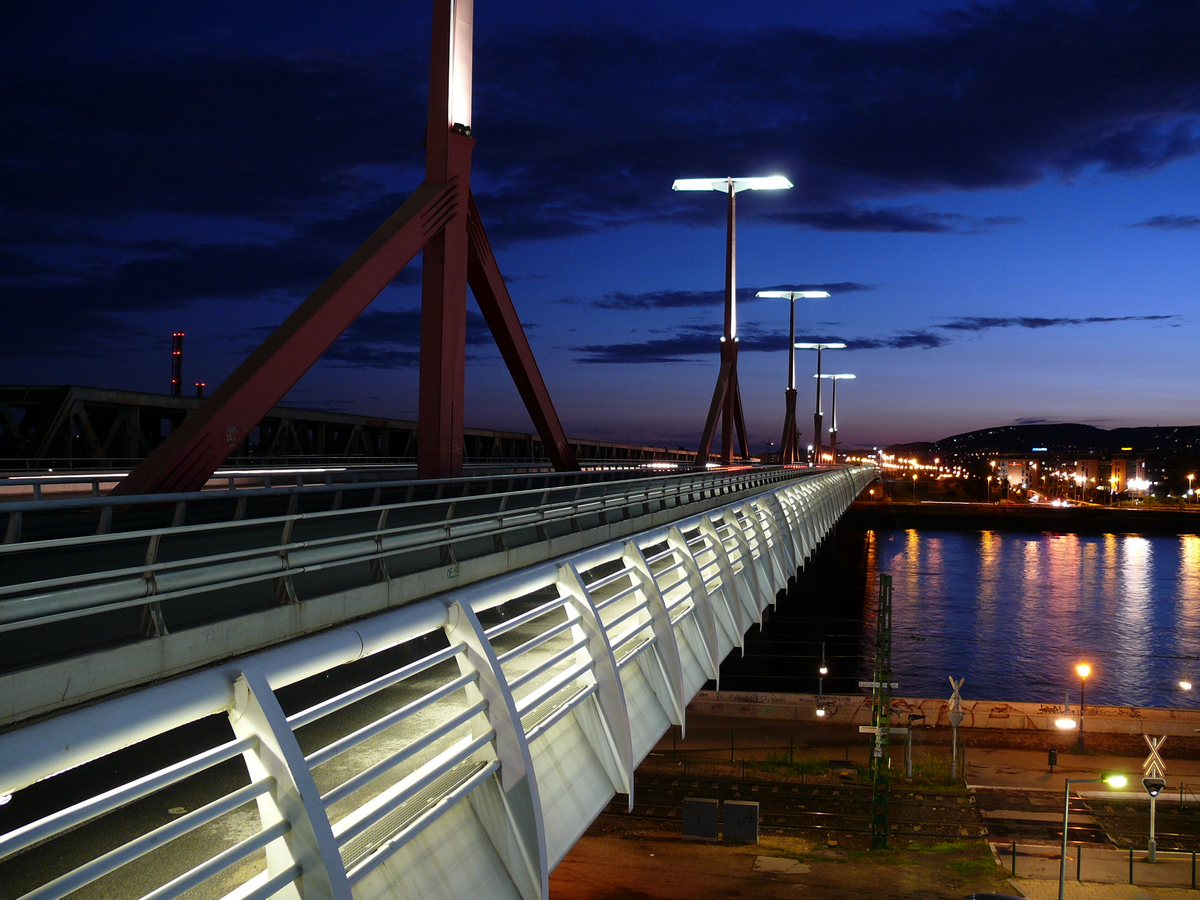
Picture of the bridge	Name of the bridge	Built	Rebuilt	Buda	Pest
	Árpád Bridge; Árpád híd	1950		III.	XIII.
	Margaret Bridge; Margit híd	1876	1948	II.	V., XIII.
	Széchenyi Chain Bridge; Széchenyi Lánchíd	1849	1949	I.	V.
	Elisabeth Bridge; Erzsébet híd	1903	1964	I.	V.
	Liberty Bridge; Szabadság híd	1896	1946	XI.	V., IX.
	Petőfi Bridge; Petőfi híd	1937	1952	XI.	IX.
	Rákóczi Bridge; Rákóczi híd	1995		XI.	IX.

== Megyeri Bridge ==
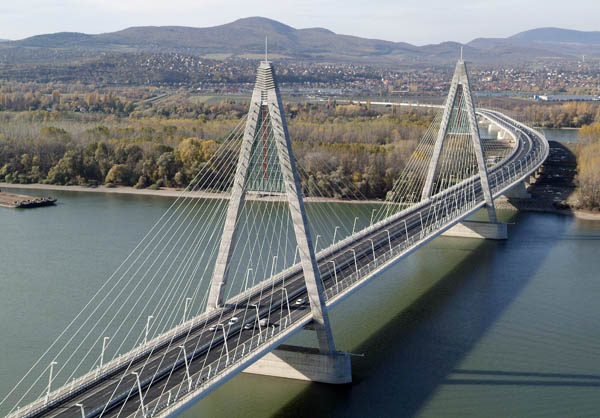
Megyeri Bridge

It is a cable-stayed bridge serving as part of the M0 motorway that encircles the city. Preparations for its building began on January 6, 2006. The bridge was completed on September 30, 2008.

The final structure spawns over two branches of the Danube with Szentendre Island in the middle where for environmental protection there is no exit. The eastern part of the bridge is cable stayed and, as it is on the main branch, that part allows safe passage for international river traffic, for all vessels that are currently authorized to pass through Budapest because of their manageability.

There are 4 lanes and 2 hard shoulders on the bridge, but they are wide enough to be expanded to 6 lanes and 2 hard shoulders should the ring road in the area be widened. The cable-stayed part of the bridge is 590 m long, with a 300 m span.

== Újpest Rail Bridge (Újpesti vasúti híd) ==
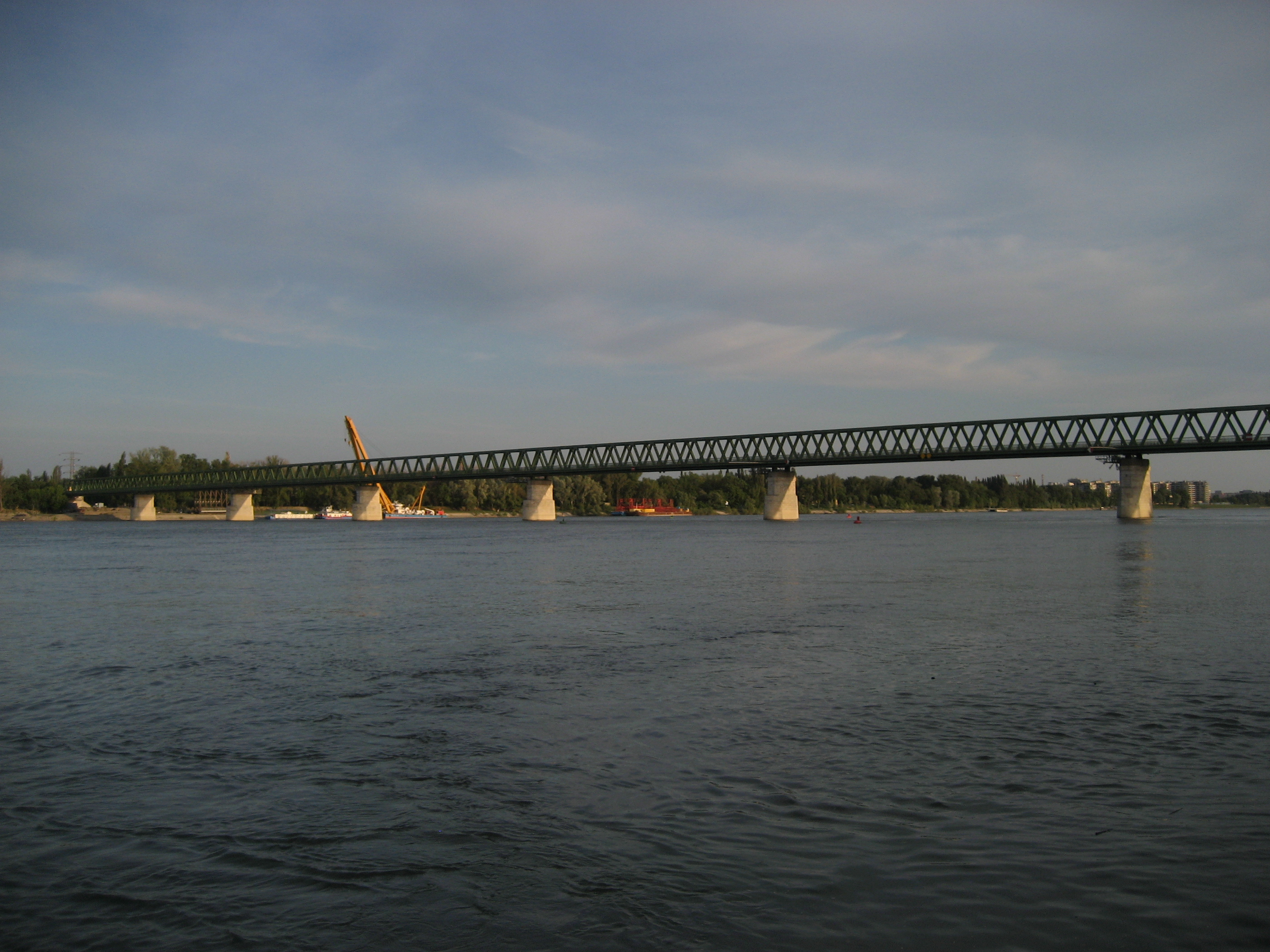
North Rail Bridge

- Length: 674.40 m

It was first opened in 1913. It was exploded by the retreating German army in 1945. A new, temporary steel structure was built on the bases, from military materials which enabled rapid construction. The trains could use it with max. 15 km/h. It was finally demolished in 2008, when the bases were completely renovated and a new steel structure was placed onto them. This technically enables 160 km/h transit speeds, but for safety concerns related to the curves of the railway in the city, the maximum allowed transit speed is 80 km/h.

== K Bridge ==
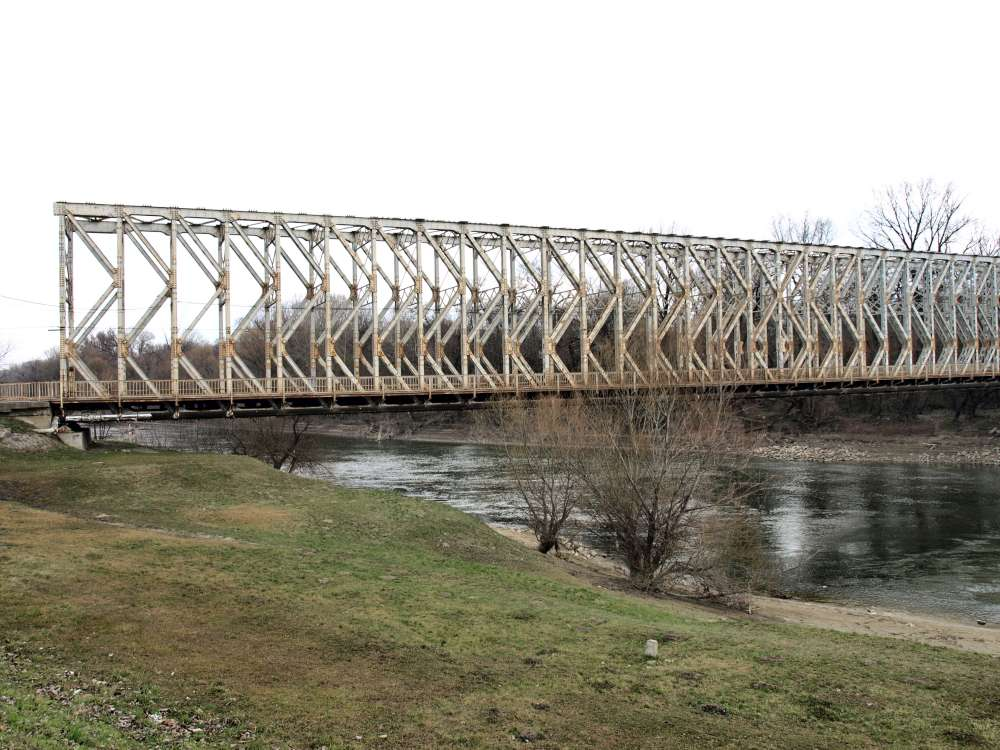
K Bridge leading to Óbudai Island

The bridge connects Buda (the western half of the city) with Óbudai Island.

The bridge was built from military materials which enabled rapid construction. It was opened to public in 1955. It provided railway track connection to the ship factory that operated on the island. After the factory closed during the transition to capitalism, the rail tracks connecting the factory to the mainland were disassembled. Only that rail track section which was on the bridge remained.

Currently the bridge serves pedestrian traffic and road traffic, but only provides one lane. Traffic light decides in which direction can the cars move at a time.

== Shipyard Bridge (Hajógyári híd) ==
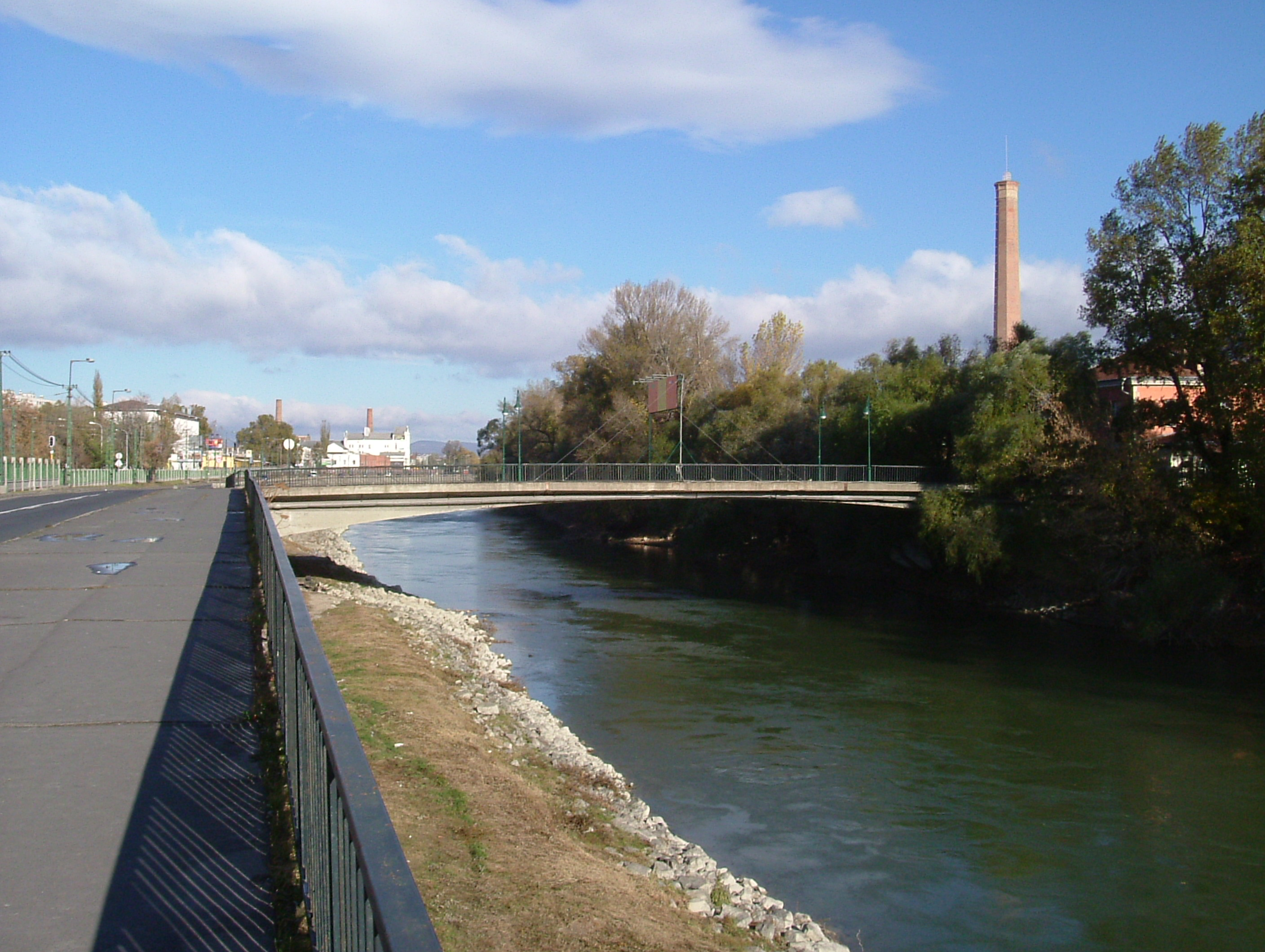
Shipyard Bridge

In the beginning only a port made transit possible from Óbudai Island to the western bank of the Danube.

In 1858 a wooden bridge was opened. It could be slid sideways to allow ships pass by. In 1884 it was replaced by a steel bridge, the middle of which could be lifted to allow ships pass.

Finally, in 1968 a reinforced concrete bridge was opened in its place. This bridge still serves the traffic today. It has two lanes allowing cars to transit.

== Árpád Bridge ==
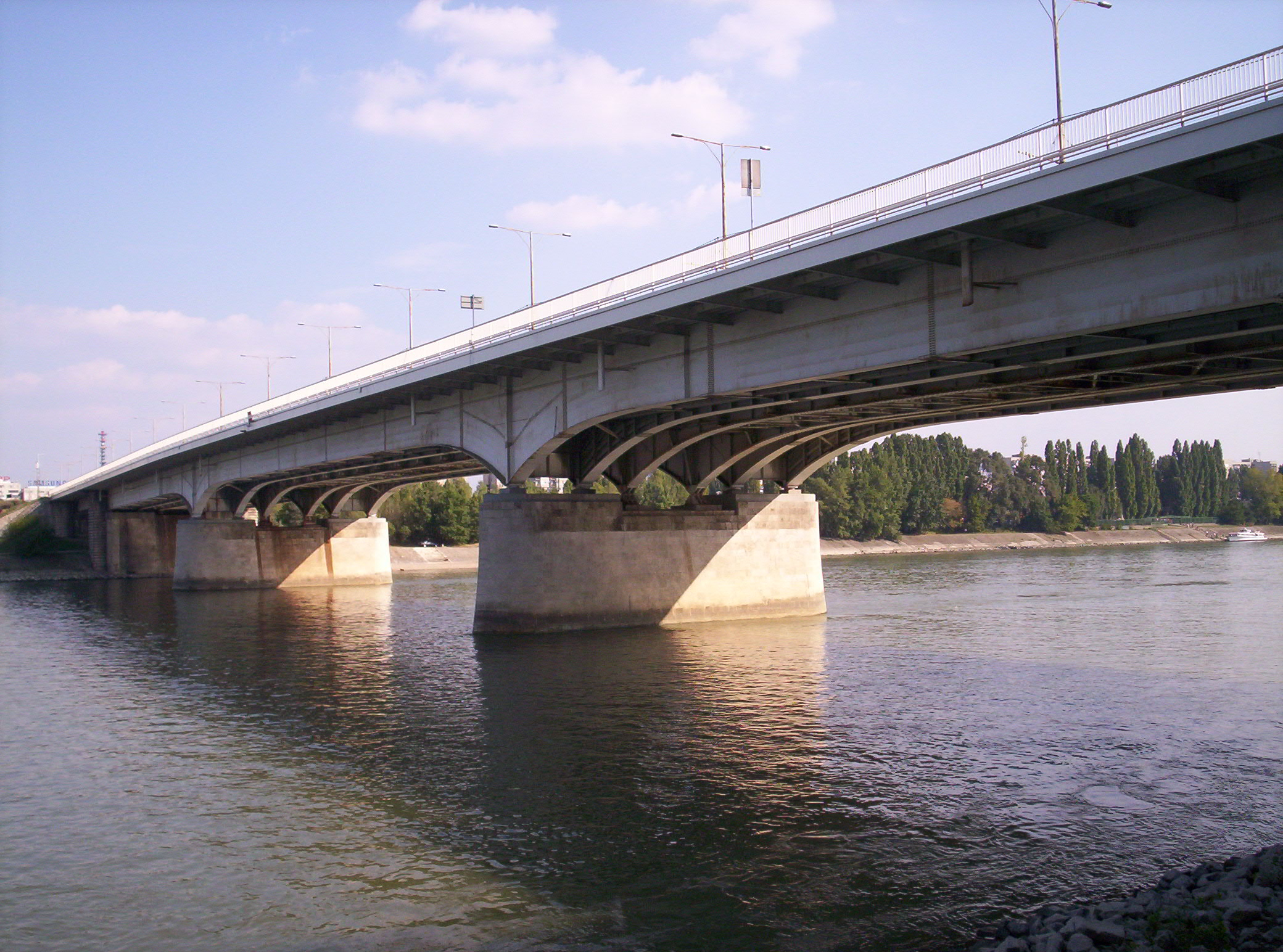
Árpád bridge is the widest bridge of Budapest

Árpád Bridge or Árpád híd connects Buda and Pest across the Danube. It is the northernmost public bridge of the capital and the longest bridge in Hungary, spanning about 2 km with the sections leading up to the bridge, and 928 m without them. It is 35.3 m wide.

== Margaret Bridge ==
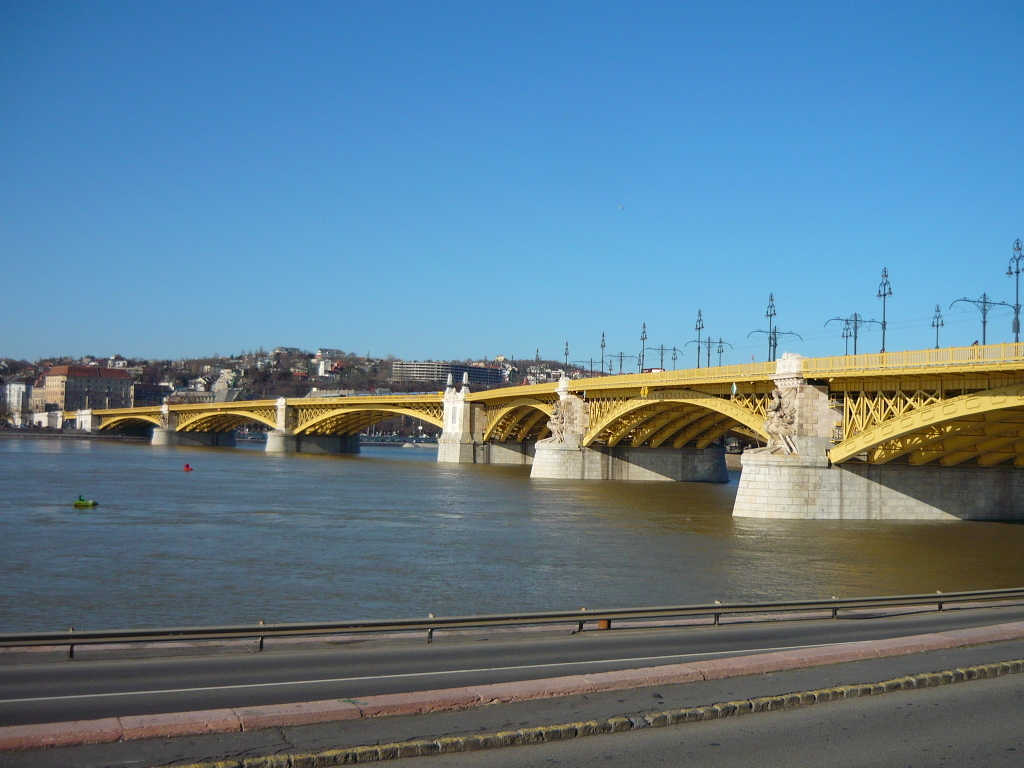
The Margit Bridge looking from Pest

Margaret Bridge is the second northernmost and second oldest public bridge in Budapest. It was planned by the French engineer Ernest Goüin and built between 1872 and 1876. Margaret Bridge became the second permanent bridge in Budapest after the Széchenyi Chain Bridge. This bridge leads across to Margaret Island, its two parts enclosing 150 degrees with each other at the embranchment towards the island. The reason for this unusual geometry lies in the fact the small extension to connect to Margaret Island was hastily inserted into the original design, but not built until two decades later due to lack of funds. It is 637.5 m in length and 25 m in width.

It was under complete reconstruction from 2009 to 2011. It was divided into two during the reconstruction so that all bus and tram traffic could pass it, except at the occasions of reconnecting the ground rails to the ones used on the bridge at the next stage. In the first phase, the public transport and pedestrians used the southern side, while the different parts of the north were simultaneously disassembled and reconstructed. Then the southern half was reconstructed, the temporary rails were on the north. The last stage was the unification, the building of the final rail in the middle, then the finalizing of contents directly related to the users of public and the historical reconstruction. The bridge was restored to its state in 1937, when it was most ornamented.

== Széchenyi Chain Bridge ==
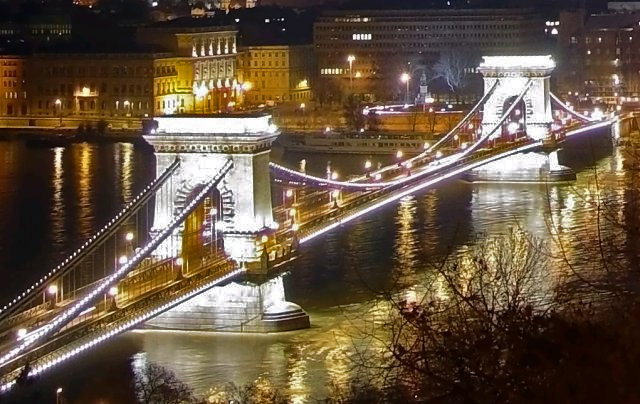
Széchenyi Chain Bridge

The Széchenyi Chain Bridge is a suspension bridge that spans the River Danube between Buda and Pest, the west and east side of Budapest, the capital of Hungary. The first bridge across the Danube in Budapest, it was designed by the English engineer William Tierney Clark in 1839, after Count István Széchenyi's initiative in the same year, with construction supervised locally by Scottish engineer Adam Clark (no relation). It opened in 1849, thus became the first bridge in the Hungarian capital. At the time, its centre span of 202 m was one of the largest in the world. The pairs of lions at each of the abutments were added in 1852. It is popular culture in Hungary to point out that the lions in fact have no tongues.

== Elisabeth Bridge ==
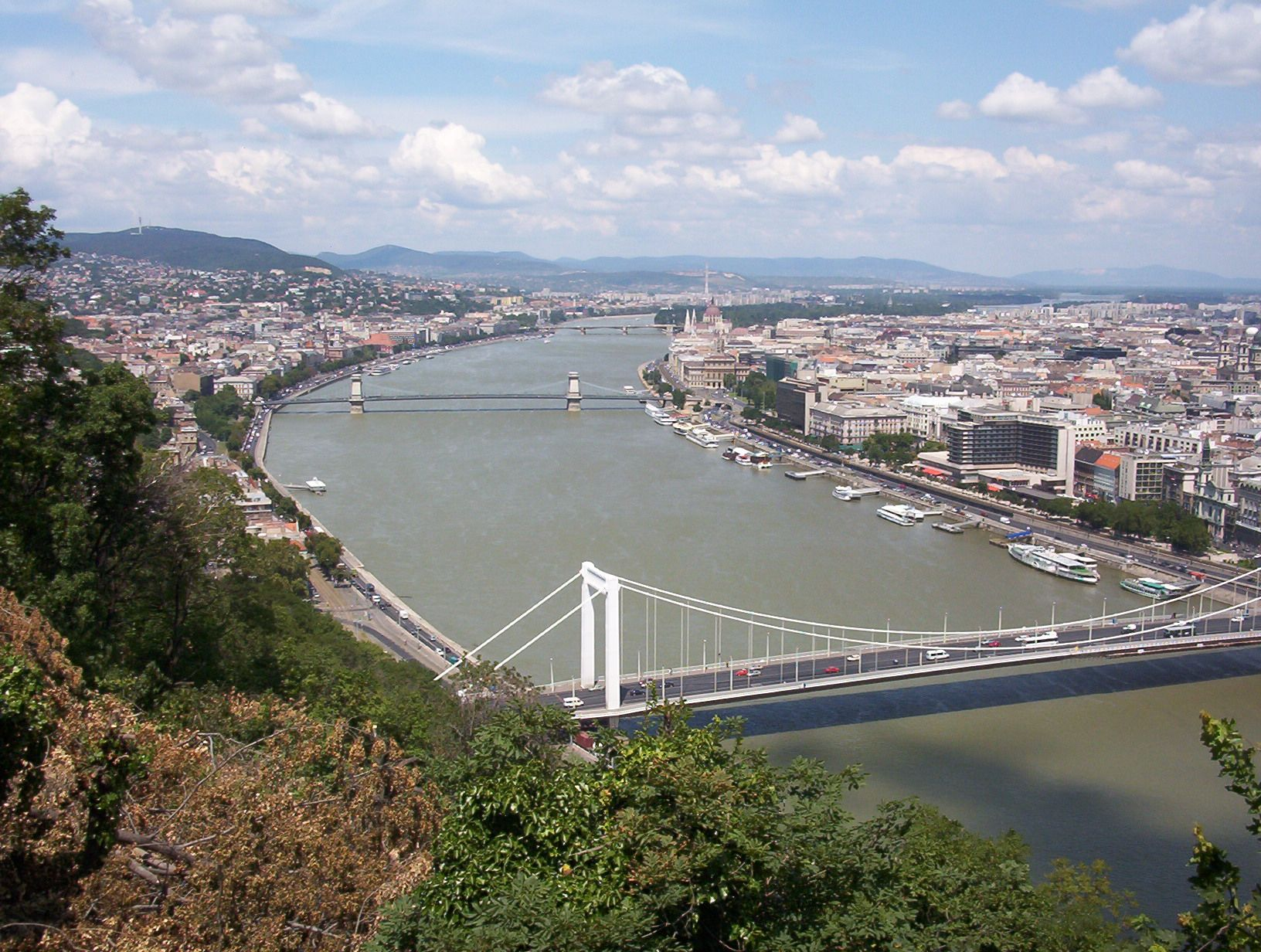
Erzsébet Bridge seen from Gellért Hill

Erzsébet Bridge is the third newest bridge of Budapest. It is situated at the narrowest part of the Danube, the bridge spans only 290 m.

The original Erzsébet Bridge (built between 1897 and 1903), along with all the other bridges of the city was blown up at the end of World War II by retreating Wehrmacht sappers. It was the only prewar bridge of Budapest that was not rebuilt in its original form. The reason for not building the original bridge apart from budget considerations was that the original was also a modern structure in its time. Pictures and salvaged parts of the old bridge can be seen on the grass in front of the Museum of Transport in City Park.

The currently standing slender white cable bridge was built on the same bases between 1961 and 1964, because the government did not want to construct entirely new foundations for the bridge.

== Liberty Bridge ==
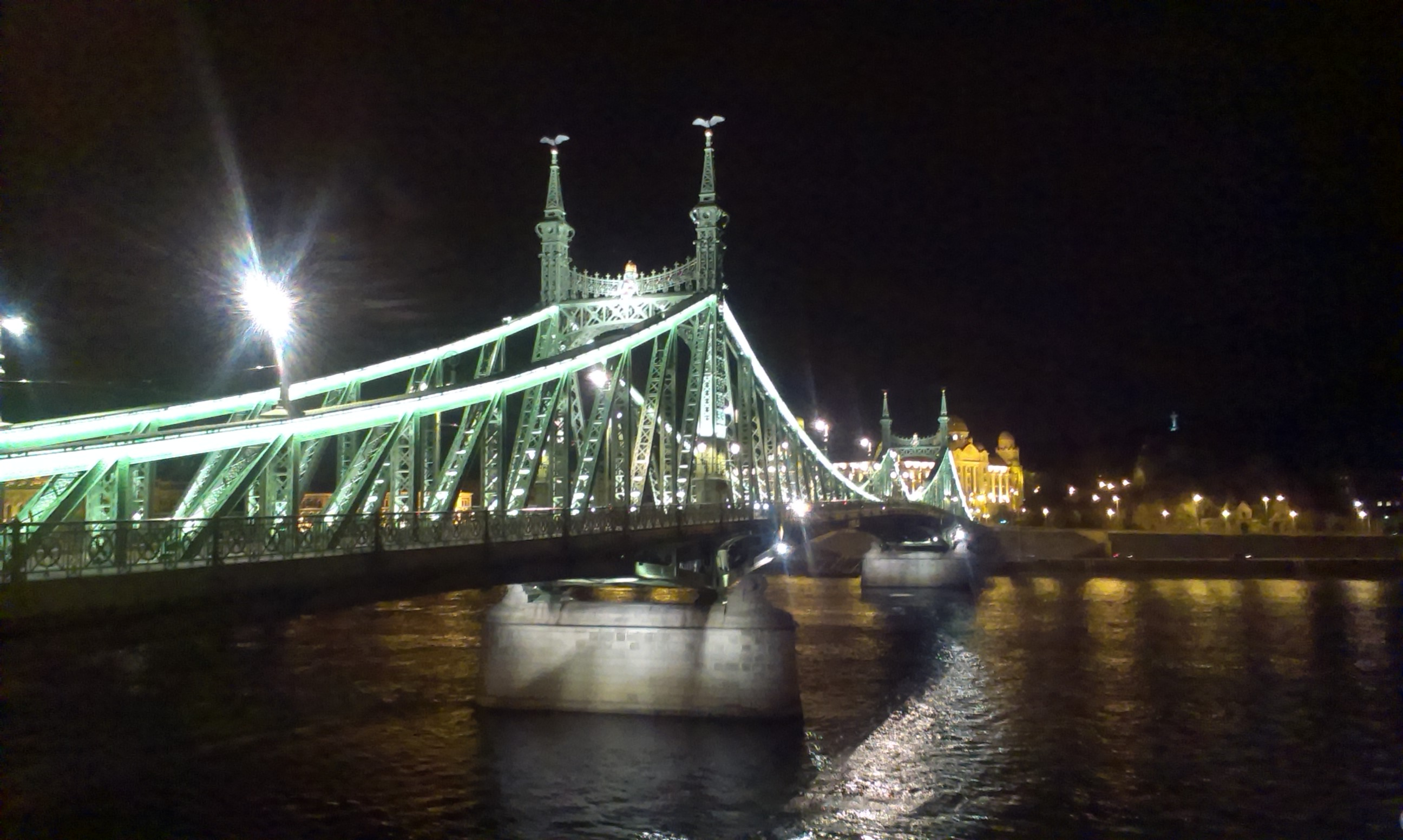
Szabadság Bridge illuminated

Liberty Bridge is the third southernmost public road bridge in Budapest, located at the southern end of the City Centre. It is 333.6 m in length and 20.1 m in width. The top of the four masts are decorated with large bronze statues of the Turul, a falcon-like bird, prominent in ancient Hungarian mythology.

The bridge was built between 1894 and 1896 to the plans of János Feketeházy. Although radically different in structure, the bridge imitates the general outline of a chain-type bridge, which was considered an aesthetically preferable form at the time of construction. The bridge was opened in the presence of Emperor Franz Joseph; the last silver rivet on the Pest abutment was inserted into the iron structure by the Emperor himself, and the bridge was originally named after him.

In 1945 its exploded middle part was reconstructed partly from remolded materials of the uplifted ruins of it. The Dualism-age ornaments and the detailed barriers were rebuilt with simpler forms. Structure-affecting war damages were repaired. The bridge was repainted with brown instead of the original green painting. The monochrome photography of the time did not show what shade of green its former colour was exactly. The exact shade of its original colour was found out from written archives in the 1960s and the bridge was repainted to this colour during its next maintenance.

During the 2007–2009 complete reconstruction, all war damages of shape were repaired and a steel structure replaced the concrete sustaining the road lanes and tramways, thus the bridge was freed from significant weight. Noise and impulse-absorbing tramways were rebuilt. Concerning the ornaments, to all of the original ones equivalents were reinstated, the original molds of barriers were previously found which enabled the original shapes to be molded and be reinstated again, and the bridge received floodlight. The structural elements of the reconstruction ensuring longevity were funded by the EU, while the artistic elements of the reconstruction were funded by the municipal government.

== Petőfi Bridge ==
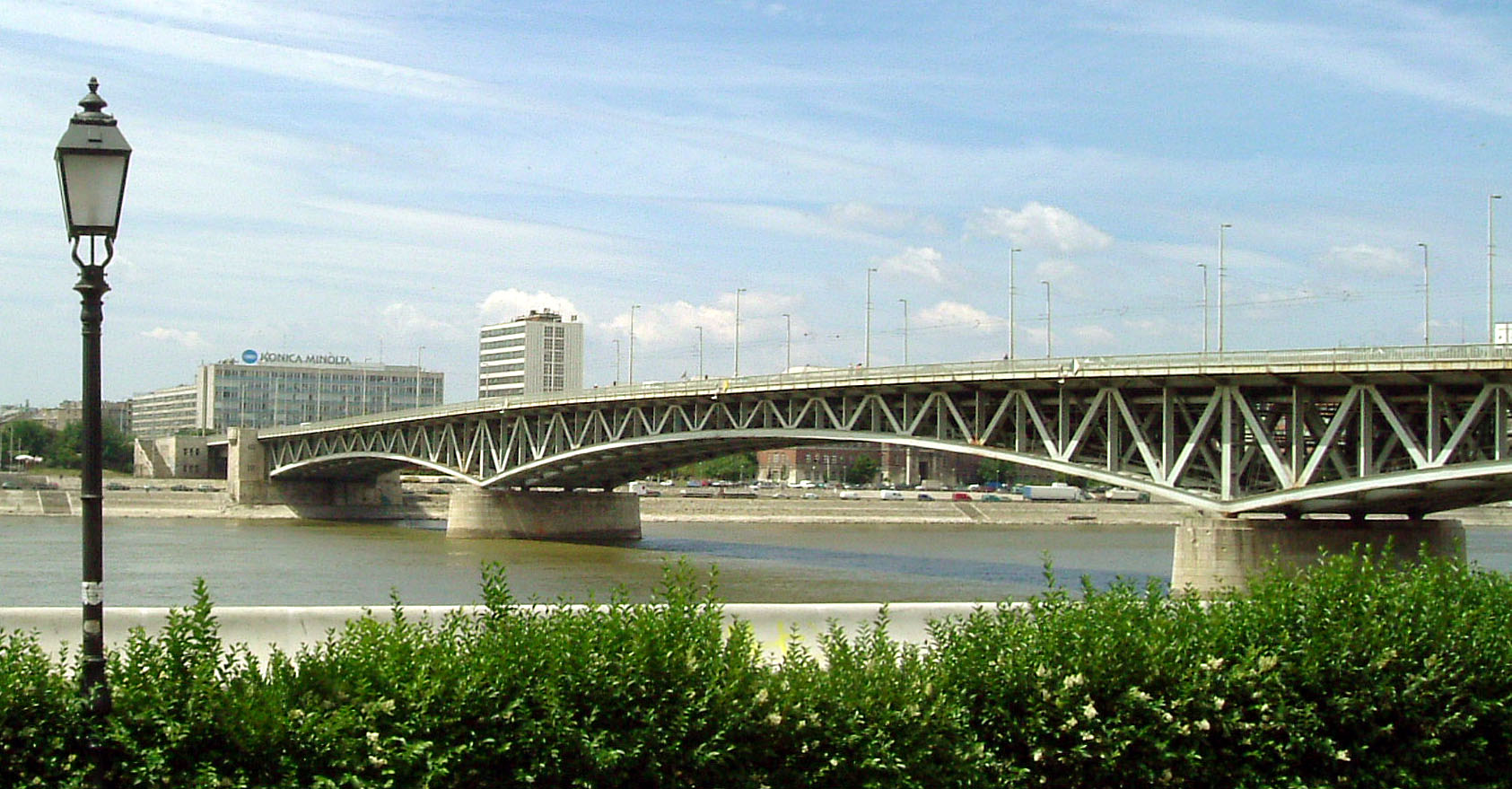
Petőfi Bridge, seen from the Csepel HÉV terminus

Petőfi Bridge is the second southernmost public bridge in Budapest. It was built between 1933 and 1937, by the plans of Pál Álgyai Hubert. It is 514 m in length (along with the sections leading up) and 25.6 m in width.

== Rákóczi Bridge ==
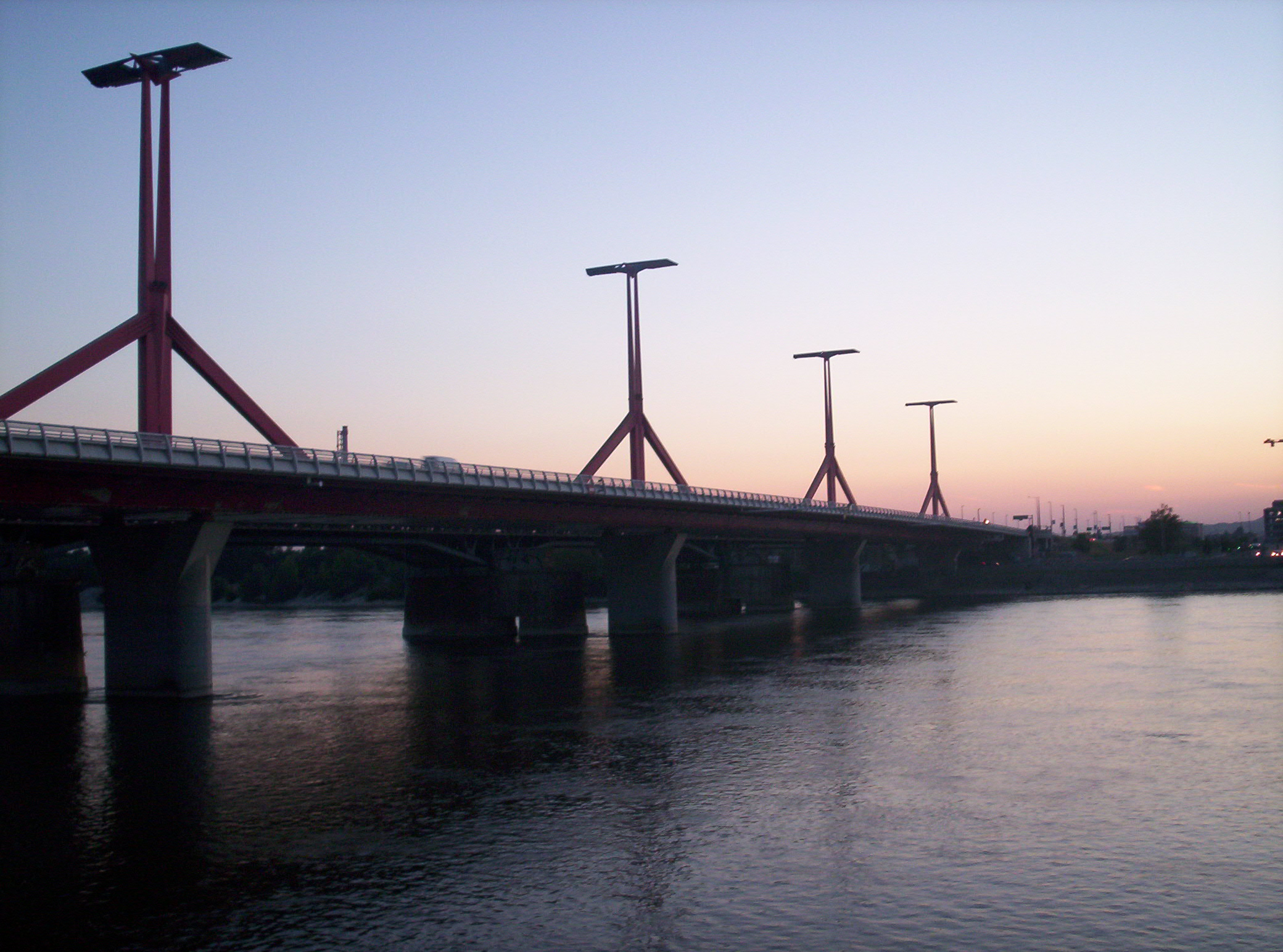
Rákóczi Bridge

Rákóczi Bridge connects Buda and Pest across the Danube. It is renamed after the Hungarian leader Francis II Rákóczi. Built alongside the Southern Rail Bridge, this bridge is the southernmost roadway bridge in the capital; it was inaugurated in 1995. By 2015, tram line 1 was extended across Rákóczi Bridge to Buda (the western side of the city), to Fehérvári út where it connects to tram lines 18, 41 and 47. On the Buda side a section of the tracks is covered by grass.

== Connection Rail Bridge (Összekötő vasúti híd) ==
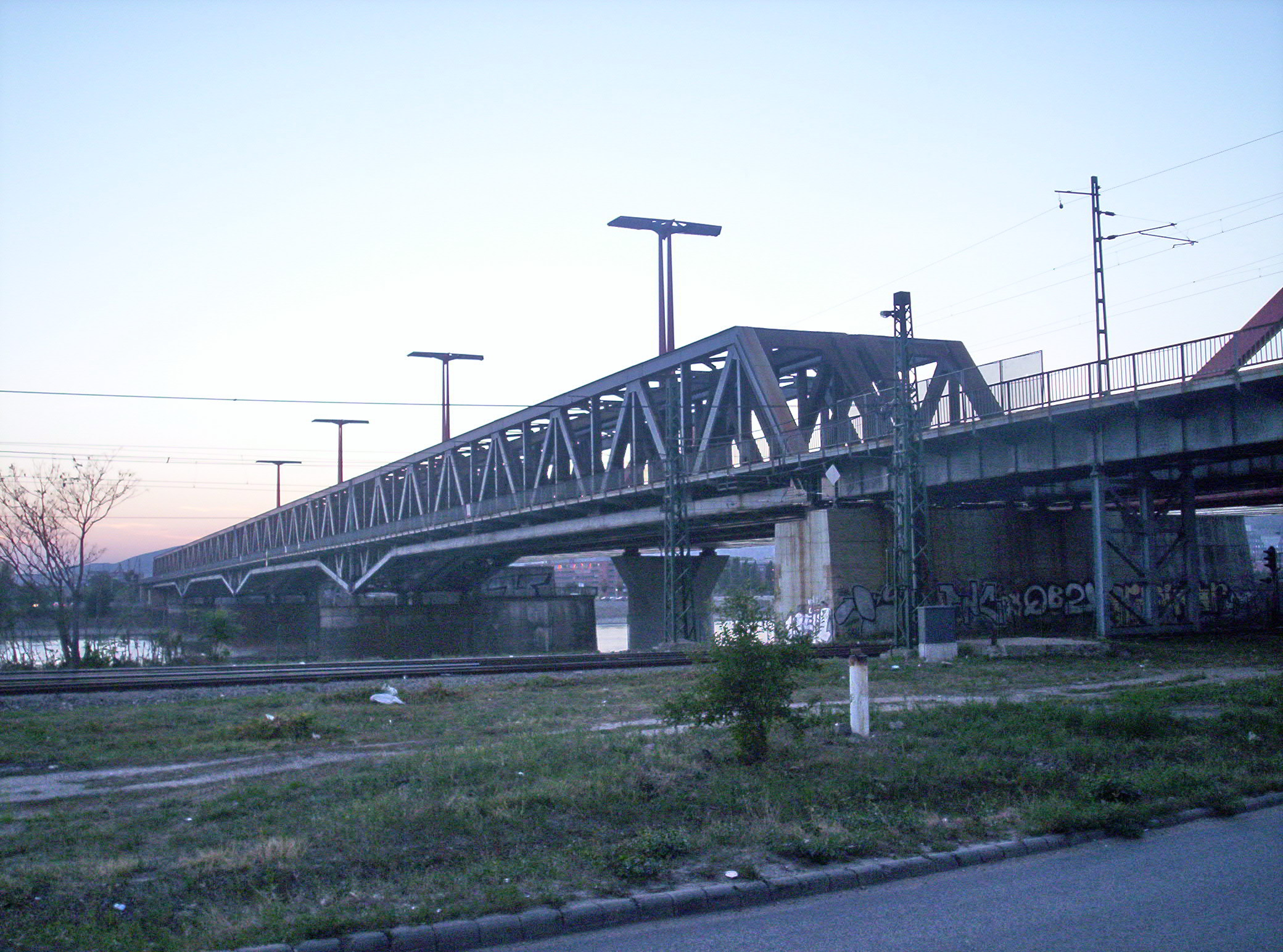
Connection Rail Bridge (Összekötő vasúti híd)

Parallel to the Rákóczi Bridge is the 477 m-long Connection Railway Bridge (Összekötő vasúti híd). This double-track bridge, designed and constructed 1873–77 by prominent architect Gyula Rochlitz (who also designed the iconic Keleti Railway Station) is still in use for freight and passenger railway operations. The bridge was damaged in World War II but repaired and rebuilt in 1953. Construction began in 2020 to expand the bridge to 3 tracks using existing bridge abutments.

== Kvassay Bridge ==
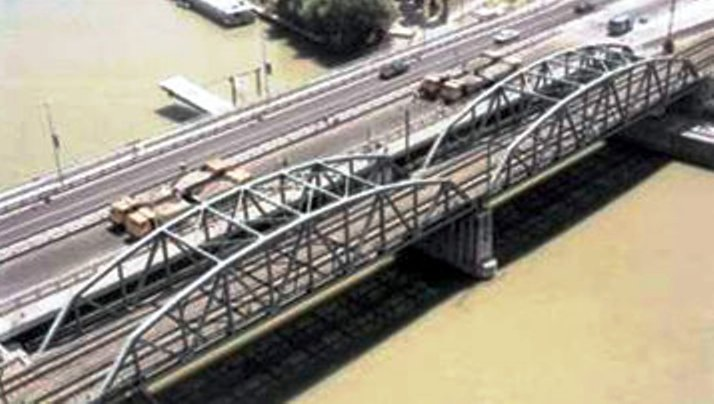
Kvassay Bridge

The bridge spans the northern end of the narrower branch of the Danube bordering Csepel Island. It is at the northmost point of the island.

The bridge was first opened in 1927. It was blown up by the retreating German army in 1944. It was rebuilt by 1951 from steel destroyed in the Second World War. A second bridge serving the newly built commuter rail line was also opened in 1951 next to it.

On 26 June 2000, a newly built bridge was opened next to the old bridge which was serving the road traffic. After the road traffic was redirected to the new structure, the old bridge was demolished.

== Gubacsi Bridge ==
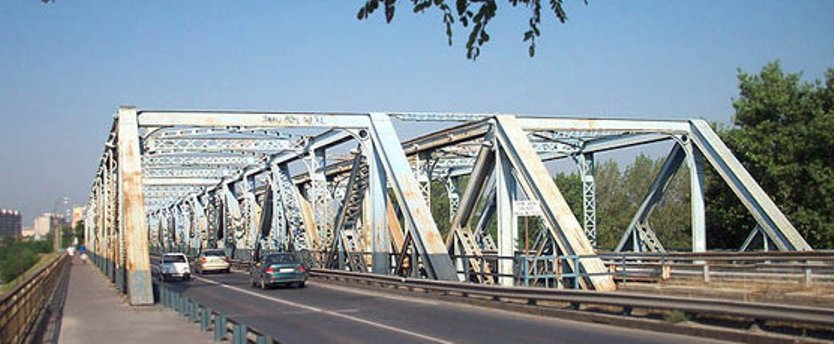
Gubacsi Bridge

It spans the narrower branch of the Danube bordering Csepel Island.

First in the 1870s a dam was built at the location of the future bridge. This dam provided the traffic over land with access point to the island. In the 1920s the transit for ships was made possible across the narrower branch of the Danube, and the dam was demolished. The bridge was built in its place. The northern half of the bridge served rail traffic (both cargo and commuters) and the southern part served the road traffic. The retreating German army destroyed the bridge during the Siege of Budapest in 1944.

It was rebuilt in 1947. During a restoration of the bridge in 1978 the commuter rail line crossing it was disestablished, and the infrastructure serving the rail-cargo was reduced to one track.

== See also ==
- List of tourist attractions in Budapest
- List of crossings of the Danube River
