= Petőfi Bridge =

Bridge in Budapest, Hungary

Coordinates: 47°28′44″N 19°03′48″E

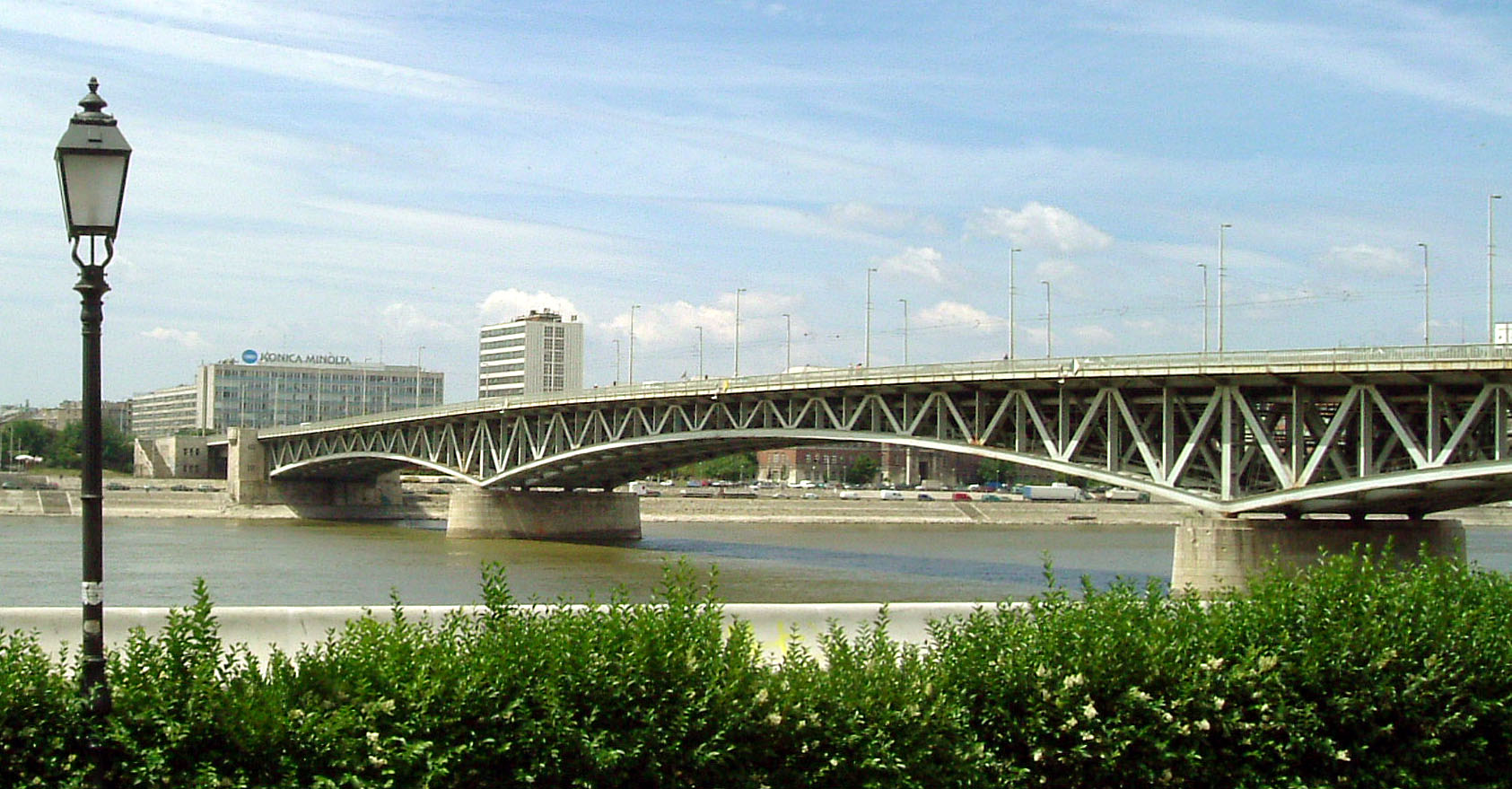
Petőfi Bridge, seen from the Csepel HÉV terminus

Petőfi híd (Hungarian pronunciation: [ˈpɛtøːfi ˈhiːd]) or Petőfi Bridge (named after Sándor Petőfi, old name is Horthy Miklós Bridge, named after regent Miklós Horthy) is a bridge in Budapest, connecting Pest and Buda across the Danube. It is the second southernmost public bridge in Budapest.

Its two ends are:

- Boráros tér (southern end of Grand Boulevard and terminus of the Csepel HÉV)
- Goldmann György tér (next to the campuses of the Budapest University of Technology and Economics)

Budapest already made a proposal in the early 1900s to build the bridge, but the competent state bodies believed that a bridge in Óbuda was much more important. After the start of World War I., the idea was postponed, however, the bridge was still important for the townspeople.

The bridge was built between 1933 and 1937, according to the plans of Hubert Pál Álgyay. It is 514 m in length (along with the sections leading up) and 25.6 m in width. It was destroyed by the retreating German troops during the Second World War. Its rebuilt version was inaugurated in November 1952, when it also took on its new name, Petőfi Bridge.

== See also ==
- Bridges of Budapest
- List of crossings of the Danube River
