= Elisabeth Bridge (Budapest) =

Elisabeth Bridge Erzsébet híd
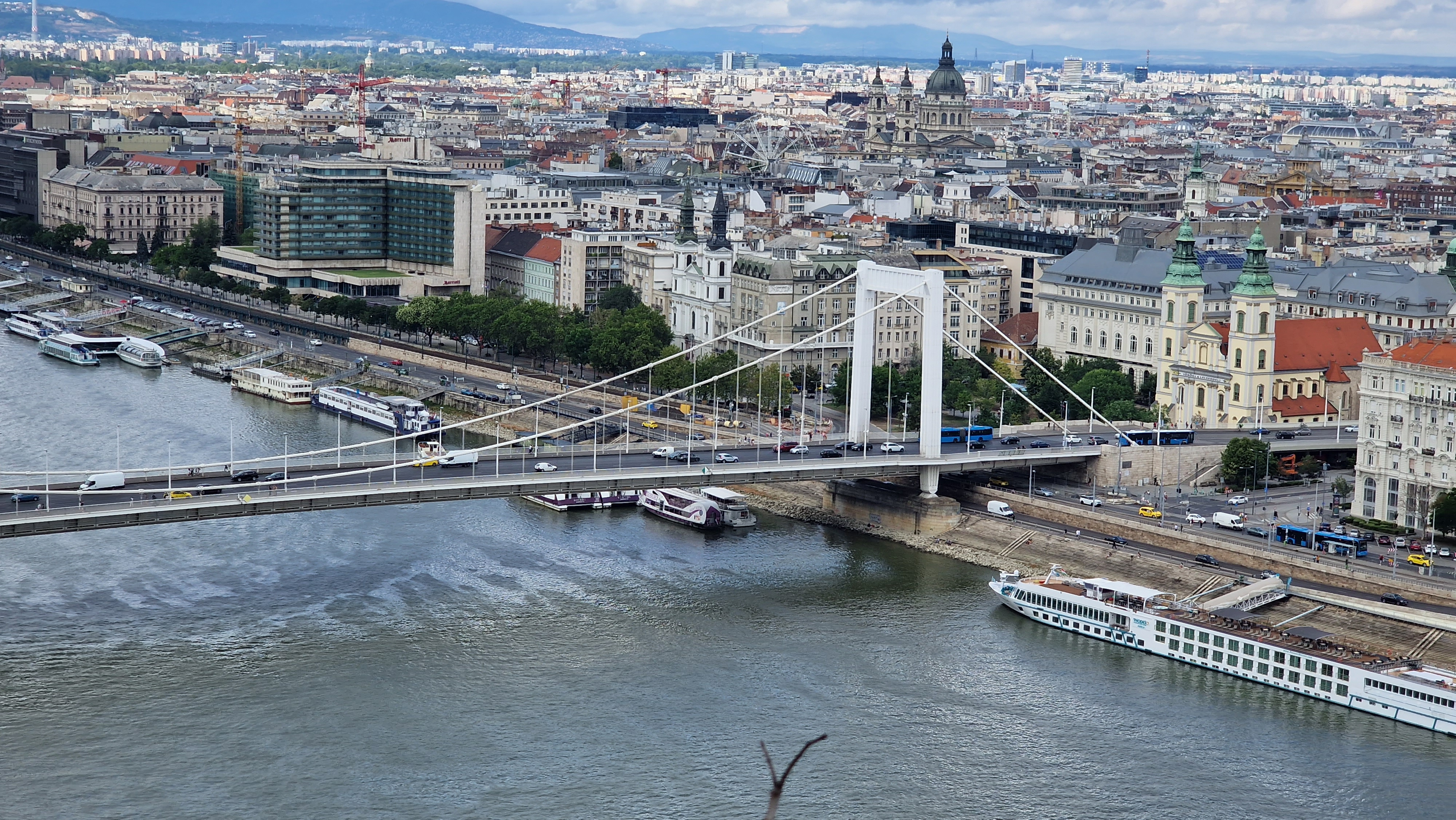
- Elisabeth Bridge and the Danube
- Coordinates: 47°29′27″N 19°02′57″E
- Carries: Six-lane road bridge
- Crosses: Danube
- Locale: Budapest, Hungary
- Preceded by: Elisabeth Bridge (1903)

Characteristics
- Design: Suspension bridge, portal frame, gravity-anchored
- Total length: 378.6 m
- Width: 27.1 m
- Longest span: 290.0 m

History
- Designer: Pál Sávoly
- Construction start: 1961
- Construction end: 1964
- Inaugurated: 21 November 1964

Location
- Interactive map of Elisabeth Bridge

Film footage about the original bridge in 1906

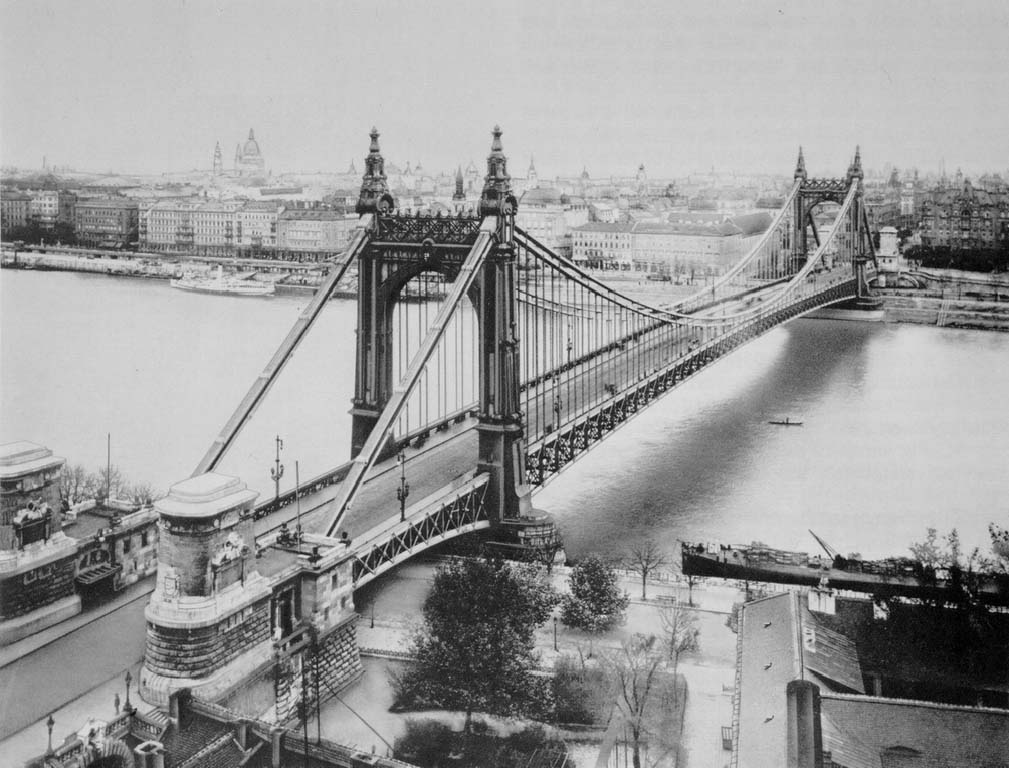
The original eclectic flamboyant style bridge

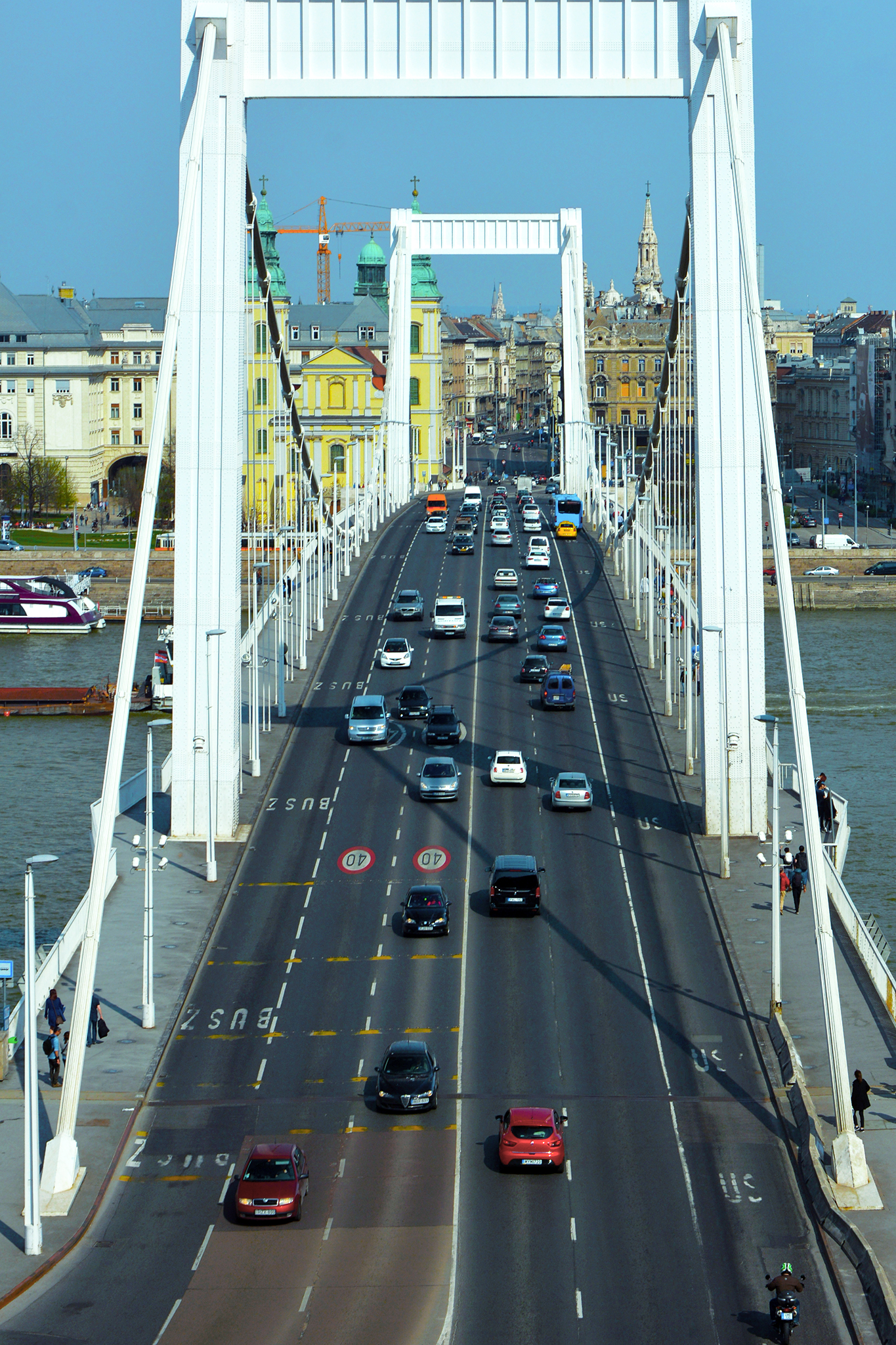
The bridge in 2017

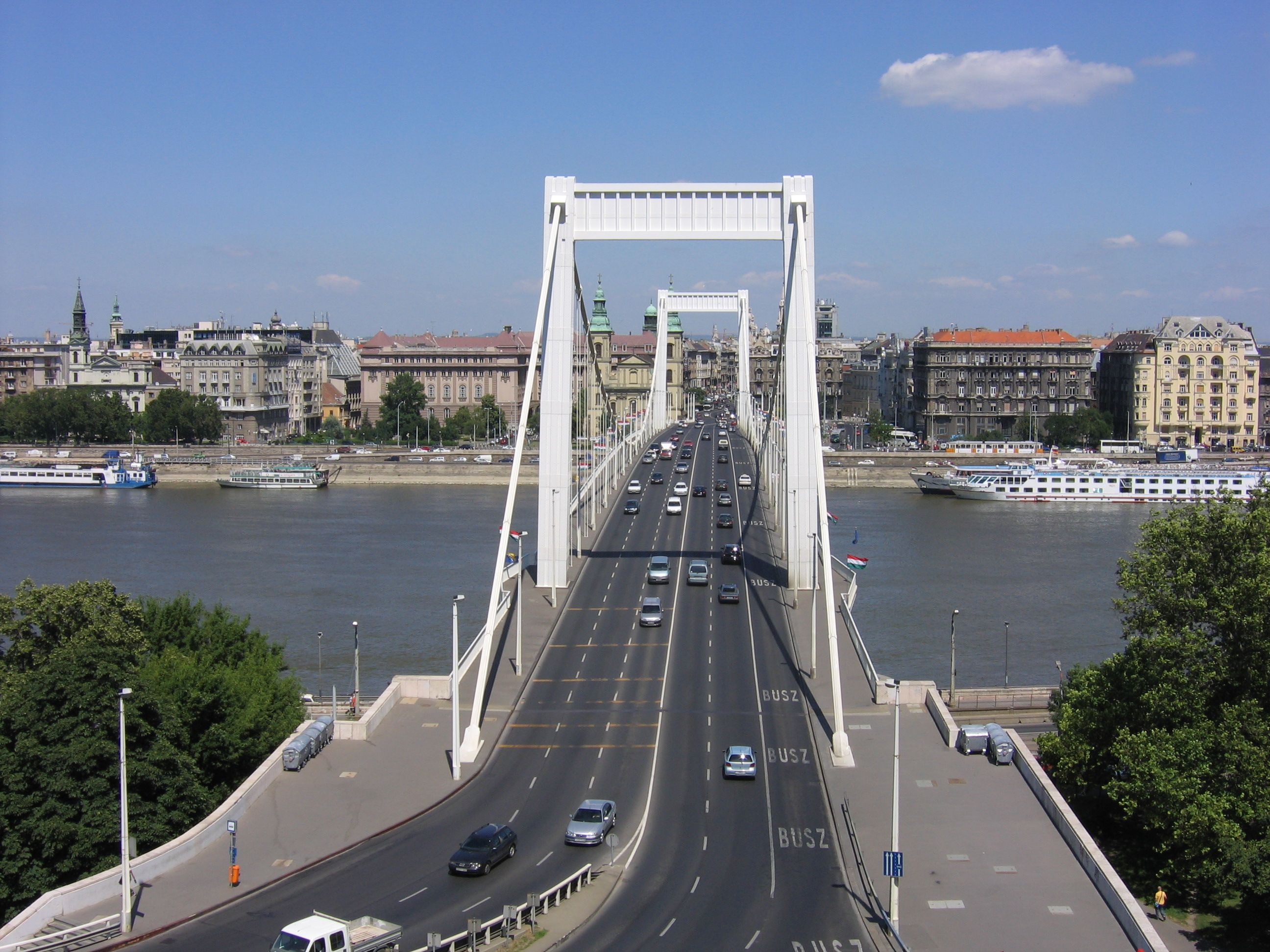
The bridge from above

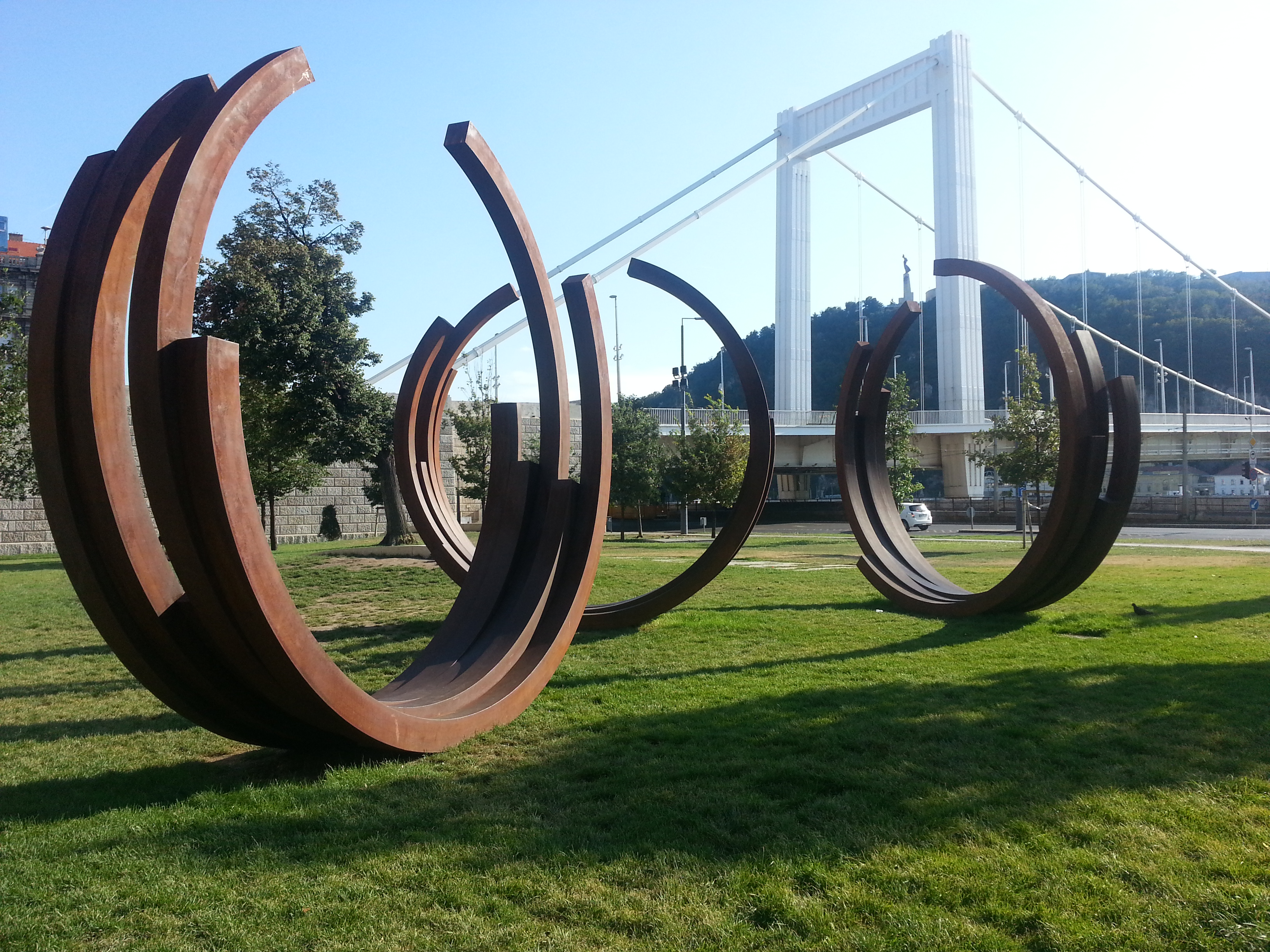
The bridge from the Pest side by the March 15 Square

Elisabeth Bridge (Hungarian: Erzsébet híd, Hungarian pronunciation: [ˈɛrʒeːbɛt ˈhiːd]) is the third newest bridge of Budapest, Hungary, connecting Buda and Pest across the River Danube. The bridge is situated at the narrowest part of the Danube in the Budapest area, spanning only 290 m. It is named after Elisabeth of Bavaria, a popular queen and empress of Austria-Hungary, who was assassinated in 1898. Today, her large bronze statue sits by the bridge's Buda side connection in the middle of a small garden.

The original eclectic flamboyant style bridge was built between 1897 and 1903. It was destroyed during World War II, and a significantly simplified brutalist version was built without any ornamentation between 1961 and 1964.

Its two ends are:

- March 15 Square (with the oldest church in Pest, Inner City Parish Church, built in the 13th century) and the famous Mátyás Pince restaurant.
- Döbrentei Square in Buda with the monument of Saint Gellért on the Gellért Hill, a sculpture of Queen Elisabeth, and the Rácz Baths and Rudas Baths nearby. A luxury spa hotel is currently being built in the area.

== History ==
The original permanent crossing, a decorative suspension bridge of chains, was built between 1897 and 1903, amid a corruption scandal. The Buda end of Erzsébet bridge runs directly into the massive foot of Gellért Hill, necessitating a complicated arrangement of roads to connect to the bridge. The bridge was designed in such a way because a wealthy nobleman, a member of the city council, owned the particular area of the riverbank. He wanted to make a fortune by selling the piece of land for bridge construction purposes, bribing the other councilmen and engineers for that purpose. He managed to sell the land at greatly inflated prices. In the era of horse-drawn carriages the geometry issue was not considered significant and the resulting cost overruns were covered up, therefore no prosecution took place. In recent decades, many motorists have been permanently injured or killed in the sharp turn that immediately follows the bridgehead. After an accident in 2004, which killed a family, a speed limit of 40 km/h was posted for the west-bound lanes.

The original Erzsébet Bridge, along with many other bridges all over the country, was blown up at the end of World War II by retreating Wehrmacht sappers. This is the only bridge in Budapest which could not be rebuilt in its original form. Pictures and some salvaged elements from the old bridge can be seen on the grass in front of the Museum of Transport in City Park.

The currently standing slender white cable bridge was built on the same location between 1961 and 1964, because the government could not afford to construct entirely new foundations for the bridge. The main spar cables of the bridge are hexagonal in cross section, composed of thousands of elementary steel wires of seven different diameters, partly because early computers were unable to provide a solution for a circular cross section main cable batch.

The design, by Pál Sávoly and based on that of Mülheim Bridge, Cologne, was a first in Central Europe and not without weaknesses. BKV tram traffic and its heavy tracks had to be removed from the bridge in 1973 after signs of cracks appeared in the structure.

The special lighting for Elisabeth Bridge has been created by Japanese lighting designer Motoko Ishii and Japan contributed 120 million forints (EUR 450,000) to the costs. The Budapest City Council has paid 150 million forints for the project. 2009 marks the 140th anniversary of establishing diplomatic links between the Austro-Hungarian Monarchy and Japan, and the 50th anniversary of re-establishing diplomatic links between Japan and Hungary.

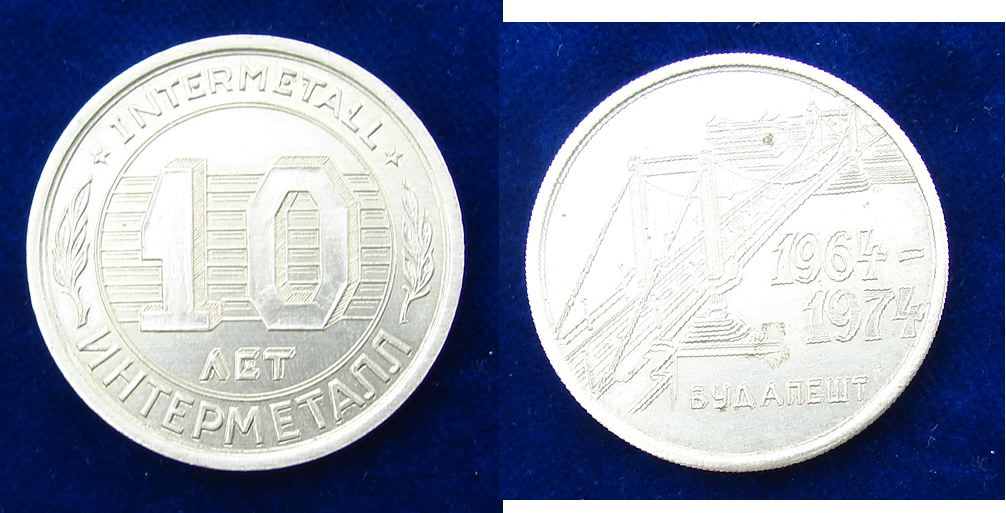
Budapest, Hungary Elisabeth Bridge Medallion 1974 in commemoration of the 10th Anniversary of Intermetall

== Statue of Elisabeth of Bavaria ==
Following her assassination in 1898 there was such an outpouring of grief that when an appeal was made in 1900 to erect a memorial to Elisabeth of Bavaria in Budapest, it was over subscribed. Successive committees organized a number of competitions to select a suitable design, but it was not until 1919 and the fifth attempt that a design by the sculptor György Zala was selected. It then took another 13 years for the memorial to be completed and installed on the Pest side of the bridge. It was damaged by the German army when they blew up the bridge in 1945. It was quickly repaired, but then more damage was found which required its removal in 1953. It wasn't until 1957 that a full restoration was completed and it was installed in its present location on the Buda side of the bridge.

== See also ==
- Bridges of Budapest
- List of crossings of the Danube River
- Dock 11 Budapest River Cruise Meeting Point close to the Elizabeth bridge
