= Margaret Bridge =

Three-way bridge in Budapest, Hungary

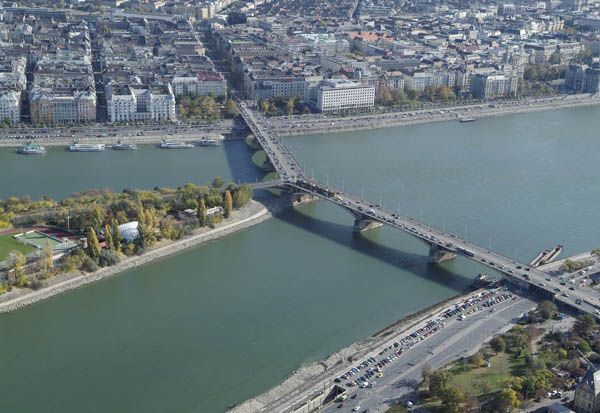
- Margaret Bridge, aerial photo
- Coordinates: 47°30′53″N 19°02′37″E
- Carries: two road lanes
- Crosses: Danube River
- Locale: Budapest
- Official name: Margit híd

Characteristics
- Total length: 607.6 metres (1,993 ft)
- Width: 25 metres (82 ft)

History
- Designer: Ernest Goüin
- Construction start: 1872
- Construction end: 1876
- Inaugurated: 30 April 1876

Location
- Interactive map of Margaret Bridge

Margaret Bridge (sometimes Margit Bridge) or Margit híd (Hungarian pronunciation: [ˈmɒrgit ˈhiːd]) is a three-way bridge in Budapest, Hungary, connecting Buda and Pest across the Danube and linking Margaret Island to the banks. It is the second-northernmost and second-oldest public bridge in Budapest.

It was designed by French engineer Ernest Goüin and built by the construction company Maison Ernest Goüin et Cie. between 1872 and 1876, the engineer in charge being Émile Nouguier. Margaret Bridge was the second permanent bridge in Budapest after Széchenyi Chain Bridge. This bridge leads up to Margaret Island, its two parts enclosing 165 degrees with each other at the embranchment towards the island. The reason for this unusual geometry is that the small extension to connect to Margaret Island was hastily inserted into the original design but not built until two decades later due to lack of funds.

The bridge's two ends are

- Jászai Mari tér (northern end of Grand Boulevard) and
- Germanus Gyula park (stop of Szentendre HÉV; the Lukács and Király Baths are nearby).

It is 607.5 metres (1,993 ft) in length and 25 metres (82 ft) in width.

== Reconstruction ==
=== World War II ===
After invading Soviet armies approached Budapest towards the end of World War II Wehrmacht sappers made plans to blow up all of the bridges in Budapest. However at approximately 2 pm on 4 November 1944 a spark from a passing tram prematurely ignited the fuse of the explosives while they were being primed. The resulting explosion destroyed the eastern span of the bridge. Estimates of the number of victims range from 100 to 600: Among them were innocent civilians, about 40 German soldiers, passengers in a tram that overturned and plunged into the river, and Jewish forced laborers (including Olympic champion fencer Endre Kabos), who were on the bridge in a truck.

“When we arrived in front of the Comedy Theatre we were shaken by a tremendous explosion. I ran back to the Danube embankment (around 250 metres away) where a huge crowd of people had gathered. On the Pest side two arches of the bridge had collapsed. Trams, cars and hundreds of people had fallen into the river. Two shattered carriages of the Number 6 tram jutted out of the water and the moans of the injured could be heard. Bodies were hanging from the railings and in the swirling waters there were dead and wounded. Ships, boats and police craft were trying to save whoever they could.” Miklós Kovalovszky

All of the remaining bridges of Budapest were blown up by the Wehrmacht in January 1945 during their retreat to the Buda side of the surrounded capital.

During reconstruction of the Margaret Bridge, much of the original steel material was lifted from the river and incorporated into the rebuilt structure.

=== 2009–2011 ===
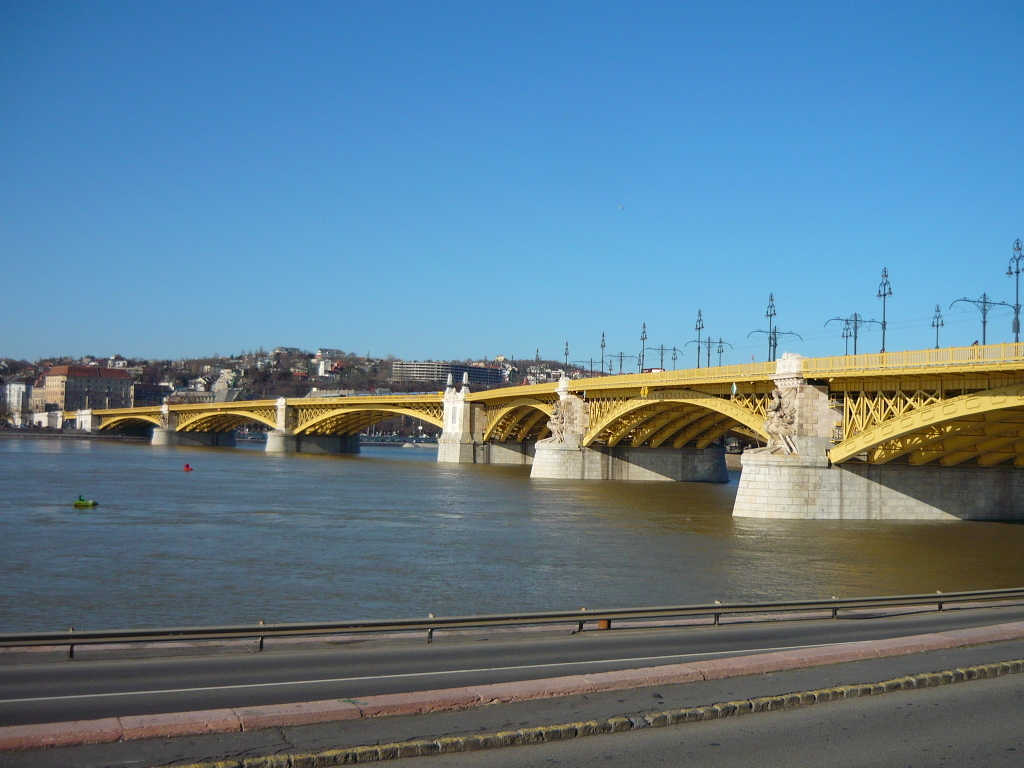
After renovation

By the beginning of the 2000s, the bridge was in very bad shape. It became life-threatening, therefore its reconstruction became very important. The recondition (after the Megyeri Bridge and Szabadság Bridge completion) began on 21 August 2009. It was closed to road traffic for at least a year, but trams maintained a partial service over the bridge using temporary track. The whole project took more than 20 billion forints and half of the costs were financed from EU funds. The restoration was completed in 2011. They tried to restore the original appearance of the bridge. Instead of reinforced concrete, durable steel was used and new barriers and floodlights were installed. The middle lanes were widened, the sidewalk expanded by approx. 2 meters and the bike path completed.

During the 2011 renovation, human remains were discovered. The mostly Jewish remains were victims of the far-right Arrow Cross Party, who briefly governed Hungary from 1944.

== Cultural references ==
Soon after the bridge was inaugurated, it became a preferred spot for people seeking to take their own lives over personal or financial troubles. The wave of suicides inspired János Arany, a renowned Hungarian poet to compose a ballad, "Híd-avatás" ("Bridge Inauguration"), about the jumpers. It was widely distributed in leaflet format, illustrated with Mihály Zichy's romantic styled intricate pencil drawings.

== Gallery ==
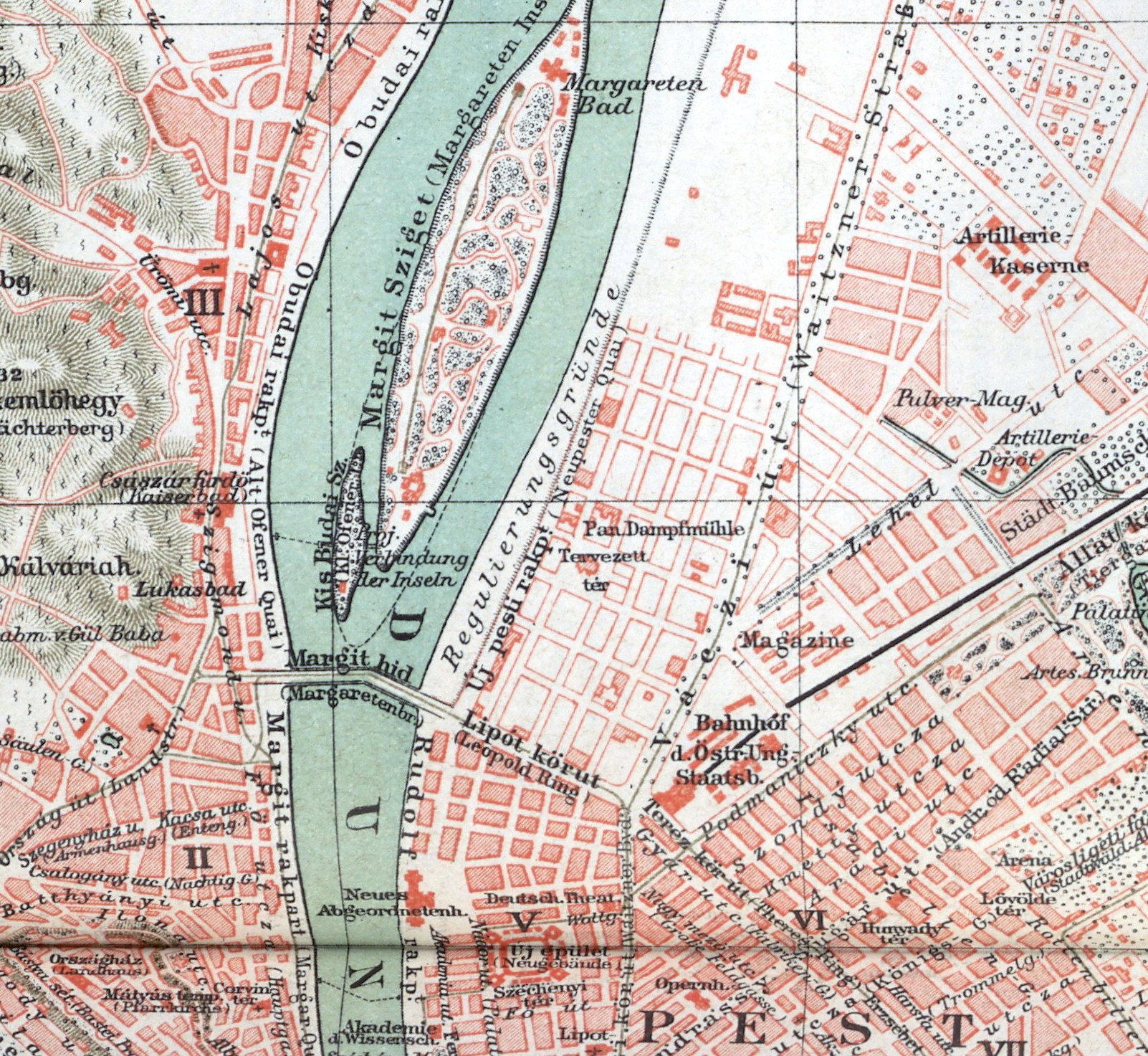
1890 – before the Bridge was connected to Margaret Island; future Újlipótváros streets are shown

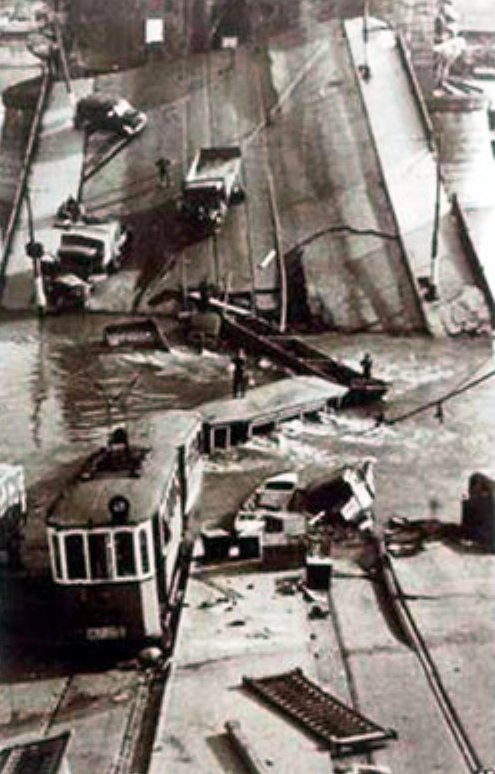
The dropped bridge, 4 November 1944

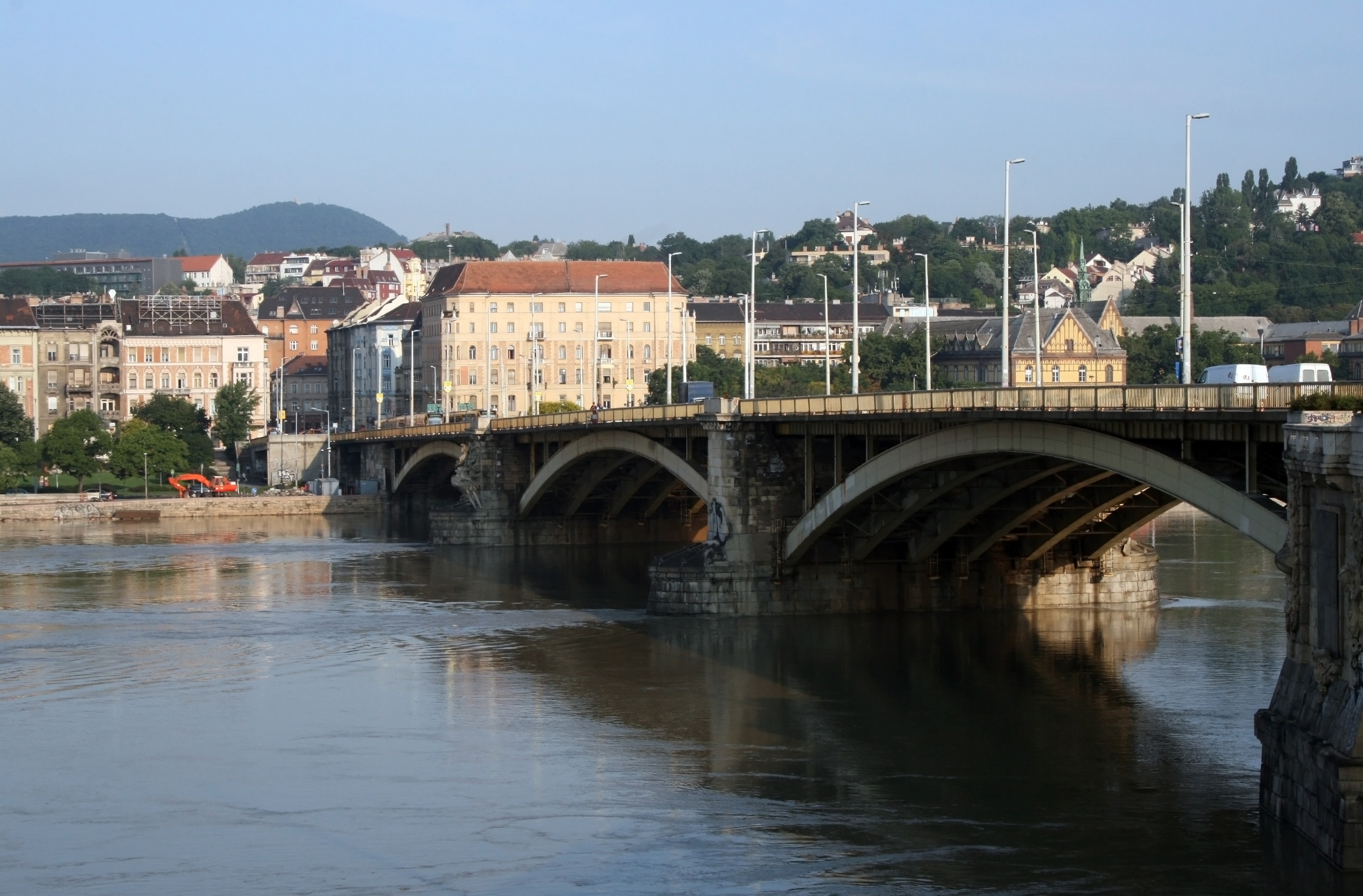
2009 – western section, southern side of Margaret Bridge

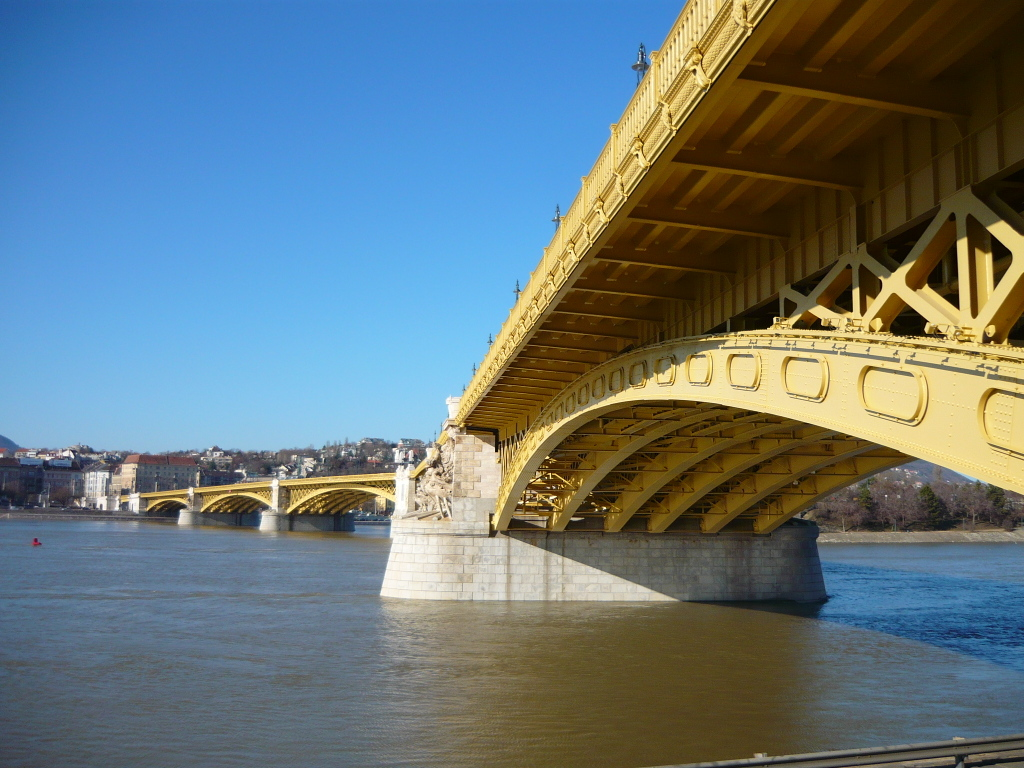
2012 - after renovation

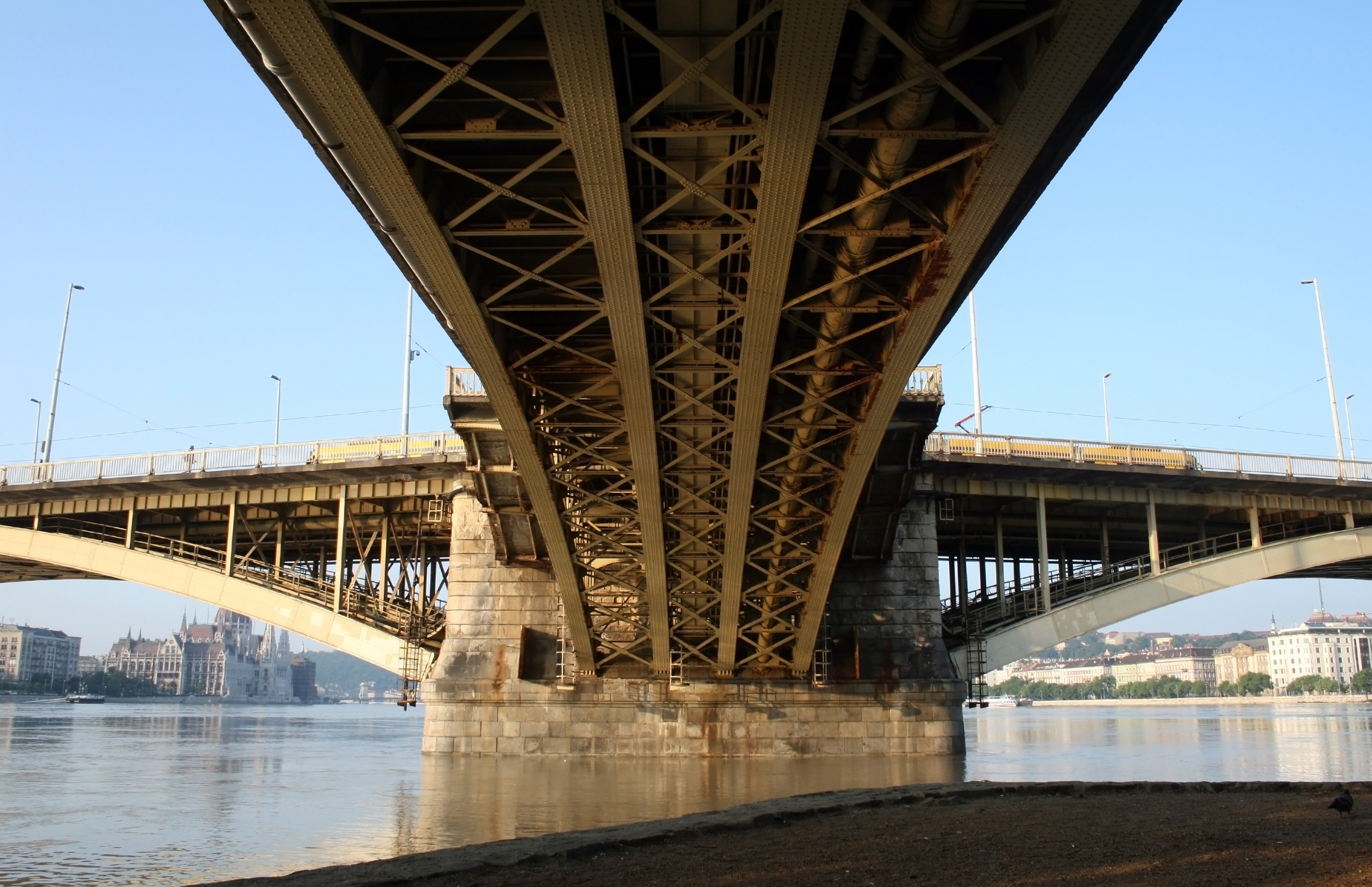
2009 – structure of the connecting section to Margaret Island

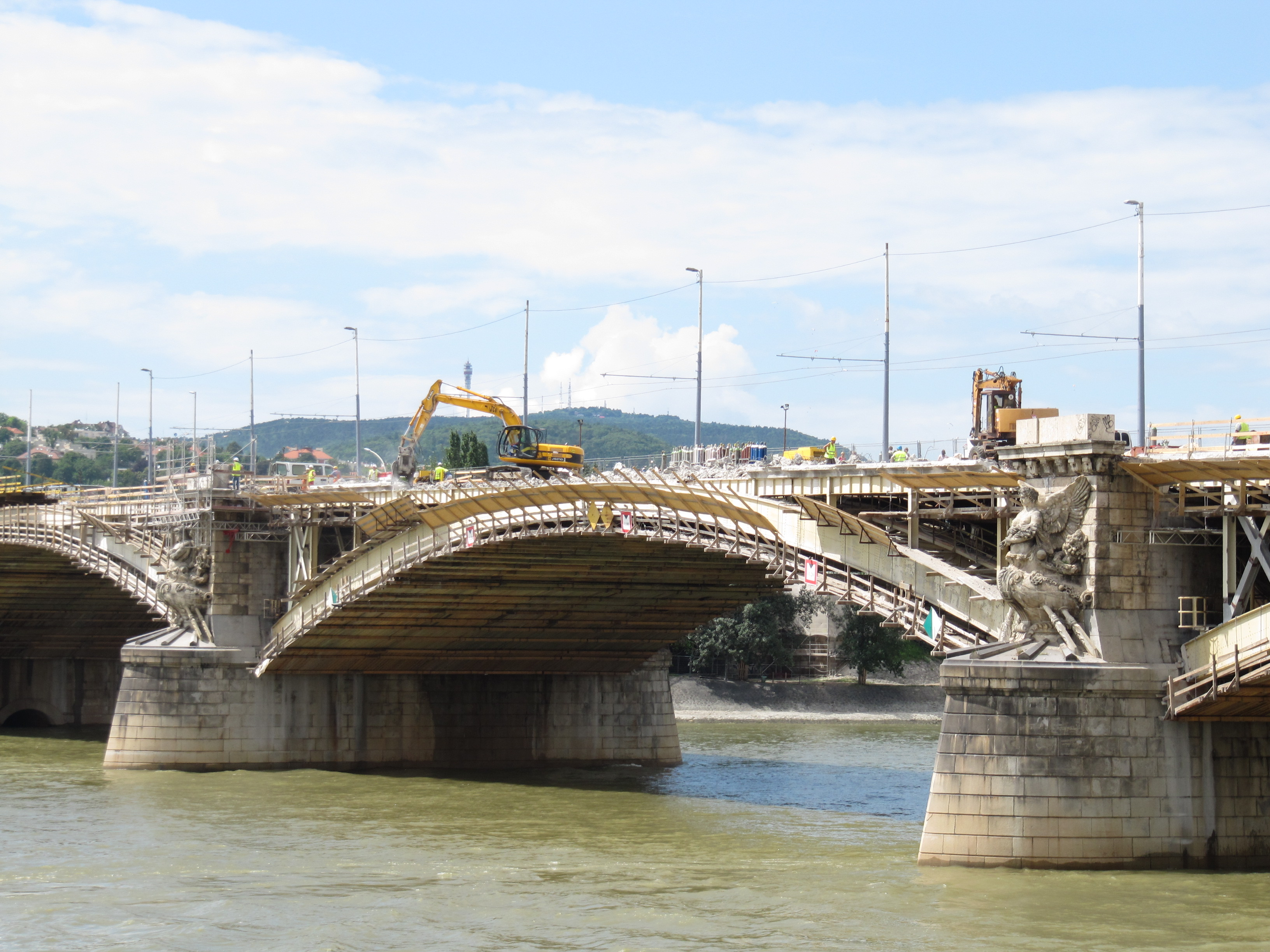
2010 - renovation effort

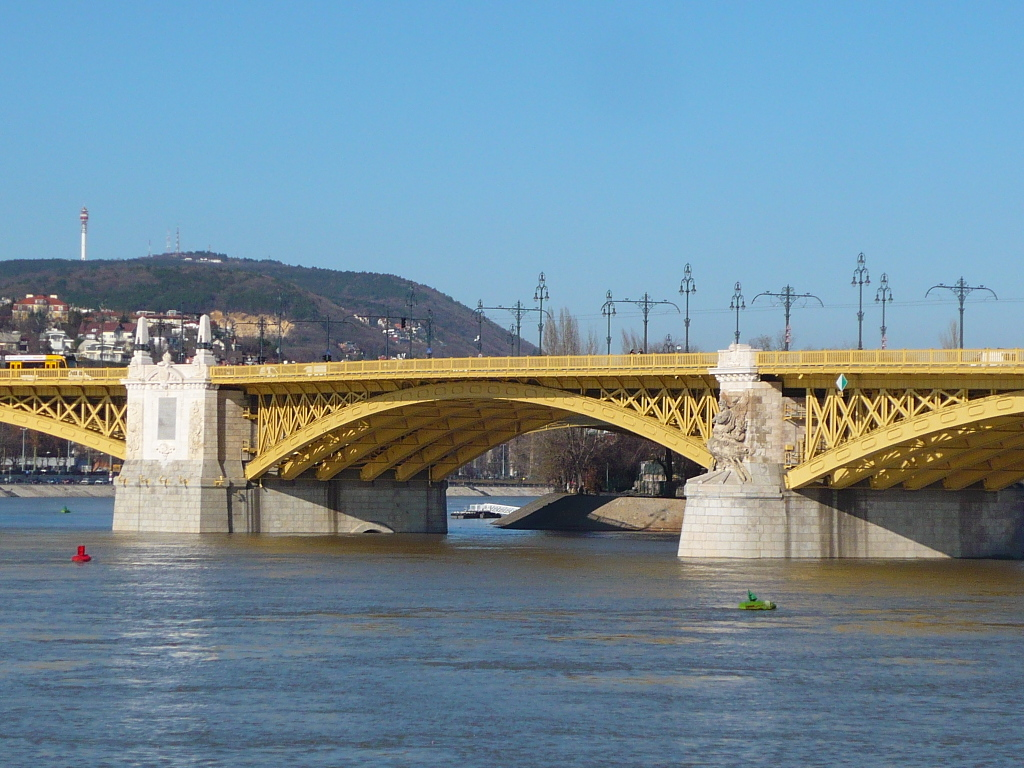
2012 - after renovation

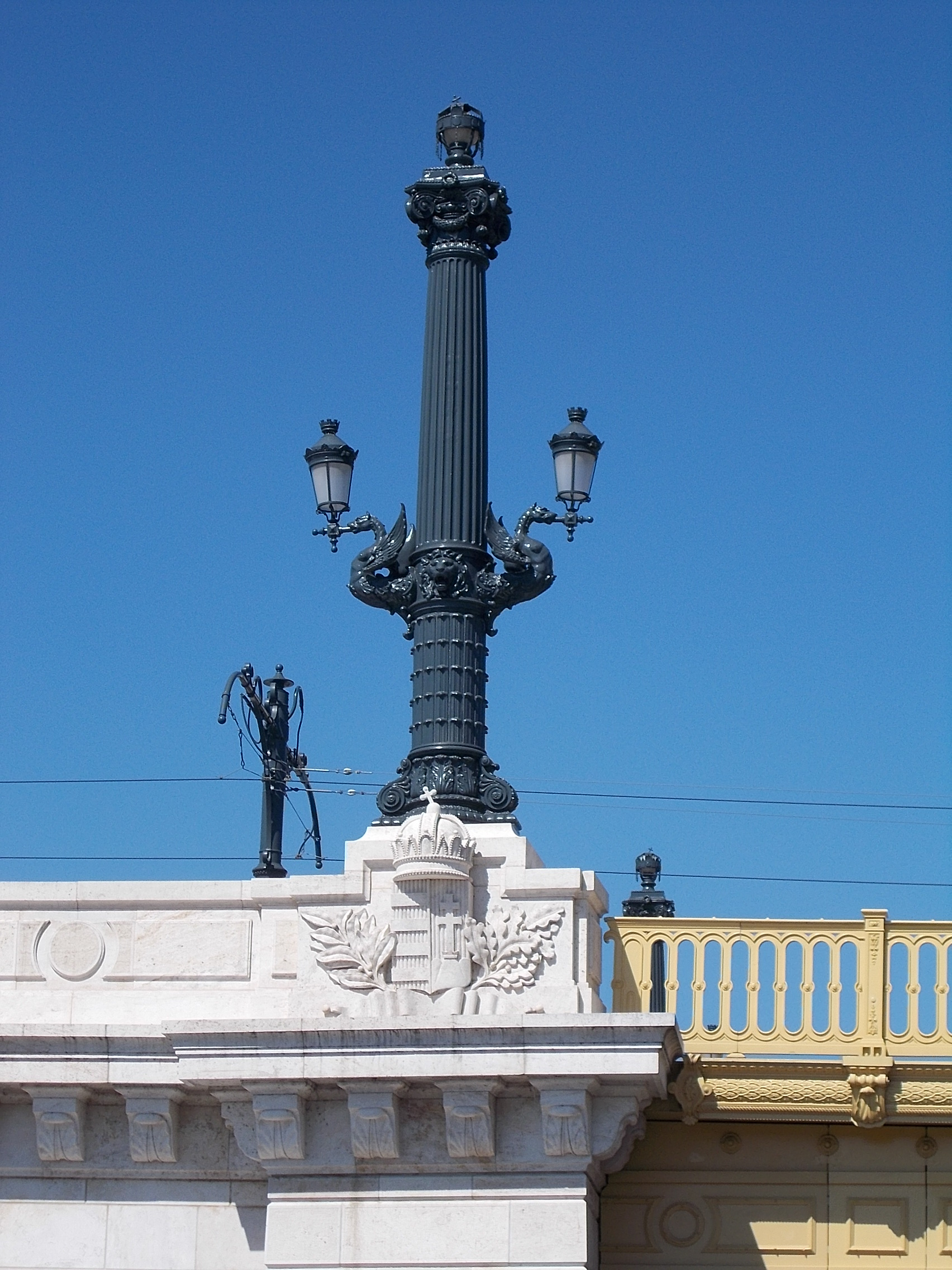
Lantern

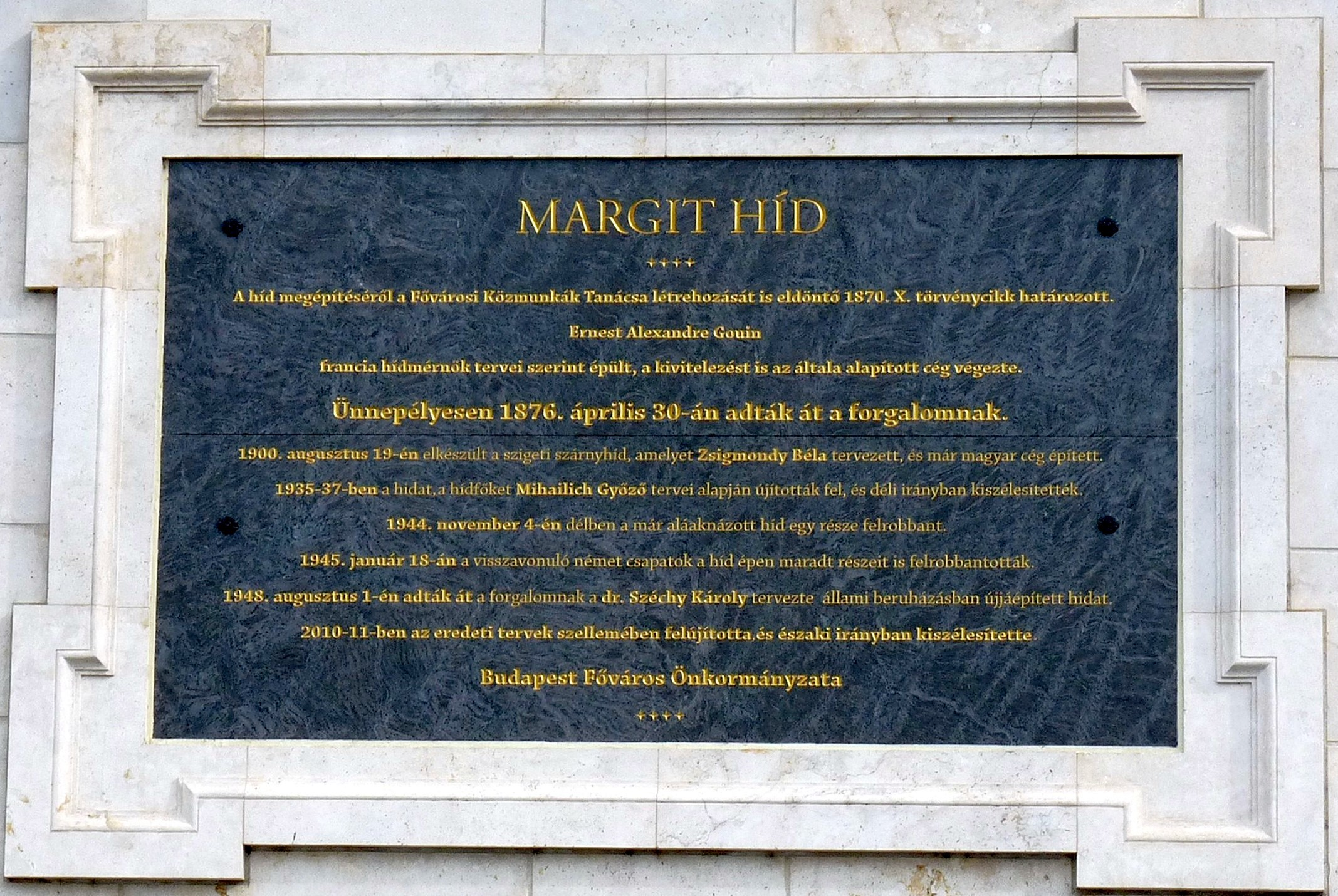
Plaque commemorating the construction and reconstructions of the bridge

== See also ==
- Bridges of Budapest
- List of crossings of the Danube River
