= U of V =

U of V may refer to:

- University of Victoria, a university in Canada
- University of Vermont, a university in the United States
- University of Virginia, a university in the United States

== See also ==
- UV (disambiguation)
