= Budapesti Közlekedési Zrt. =

Public transport company of Budapest, Hungary

Budapesti Közlekedési Zrt. (Budapest Transit Privately Held Corporation)
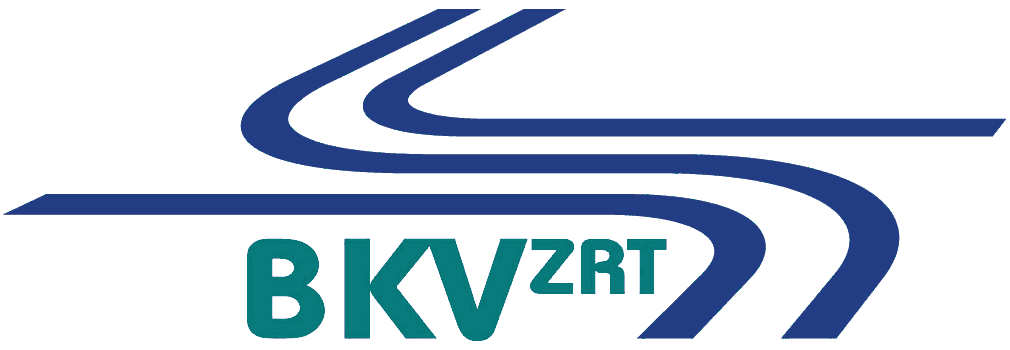
- Type: Zrt. (Publicly owned company)
- Industry: Public transport
- Predecessors: FAÜ, FVV, BHÉV, FHV
- Founded: 1968
- Headquarters: Budapest, Hungary
- Owner: Budapest Metropolitan City Council (100% public ownership)
- Number of employees: 13,000+
- Website: https://www.bkv.hu/

Budapesti Közlekedési Zártkörűen Működő Részvénytársaság, abbreviated to BKV Zrt. (Hungarian pronunciation: [ˈbudɒpɛʃti ˈkøzlɛkɛdeːʃi ˈzeːjɛrteː], "Budapest Transit Company", the abbreviation BKV stands for its earlier name Budapesti Közlekedési Vállalat) is the main public transport operator in Budapest, Hungary. BKV was established in 1968 as a unified public transport company with the merger of the companies responsible for the different means of transport: bus operator FAÜ (Fővárosi Autóbuszüzem), tram and trolleybus operator FVV (Fővárosi Villamosvasút), suburban railway operator BHÉV (Budapesti Helyiérdekű Vasút) and riverboat operator FHV (Fővárosi Hajózási Vállalat). The metro was added in 1973. Transport in Budapest underwent another reorganization in 2010 when BKK (Budapesti Közlekedési Központ, "Budapest Transit Centre") was founded for the management of the city transport and infrastructure.

Since then, BKV is the largest public transport contractor of BKK, operating 4 metro lines, 36 tram, and 13 trolley bus routes, and 30% of the 243 local bus and 46 night bus lines.

== Road vehicle operation ==
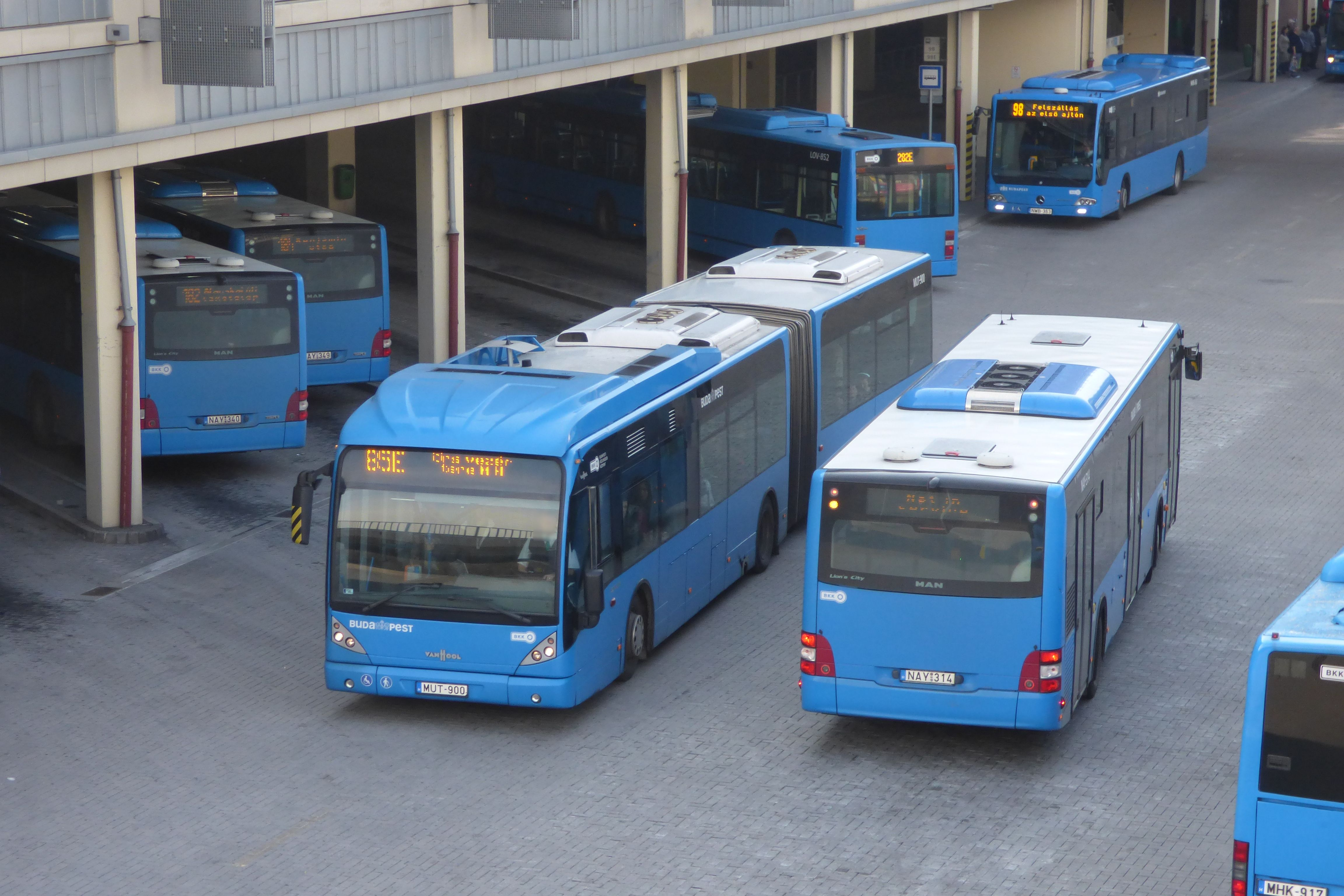
BKV buses at Kőbánya-Kispest bus terminal

City-owned BKV runs most of the vehicles of the extensive network of surface mass transportation in Budapest, with the emphasis on buses. The 900~ BKV-owned buses in Budapest circulate on 30% of the 243 routes. The buses are painted sky blue. Trolleybuses in red livery are operated on 13 routes. The night service is provided exclusively by buses and by the trams on Great Boulevard, but is planned to be overhauled in the future. The articulated bus is a hallmark of Budapest; both diesel and ETB bendy vehicles have been running since the late 1950s and still form the majority of BKV's fleet.

The late-2000s road rebuilding effort (affecting 50% of the city's principal roadways) also changed the lanes, creating distinct lanes for vehicles, reducing the travel time of the buses. Completing the eastern sector of M0 beltway around the city in 2008 significantly reduced traffic congestion, and the inauguration of metro line M4 in 2014 further helped the situation. Competitive wages are still a serious issue as bus drivers are often lured to the trucking industry.

== Rail services ==
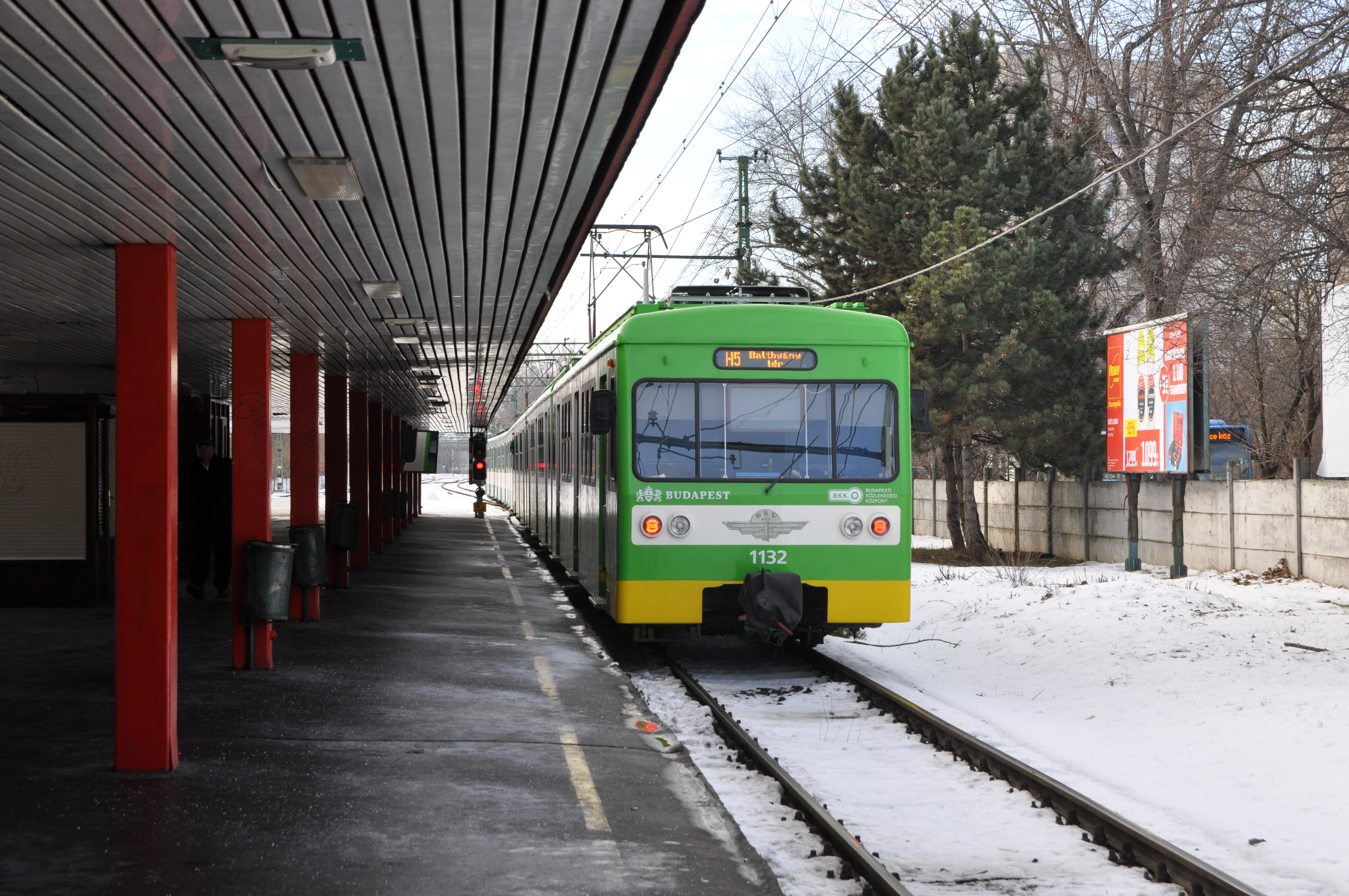
Commuter Railway (HÉV) at Békásmegyer Station, formerly operated by BKV, but now under the aegis of MÁV

BKV operates 36 city tram routes, including the Budapest Cog Railway that operates as tram line 60. The once-extensive network of tram tracks and the brown striped yellow trams were a characteristic of Budapest, but the network was curtailed under Communism owing to lack of funding. Line 4-6 is still the largest capacity tramline in Europe. The tram services are now set to have a renaissance as there is no further road capacity for bus lanes in Budapest. Replacing the more than 40-year-old rolling stock started in 2006 with new 54-meter long Siemens Combino Supra giants completely replacing former carriages on the 4-6 line.

The underground railway network is less extensive, consisting of four lines, but is still largely the most used mean of public transport in Budapest, with more than 1 million riders per day. The M1 line (or Földalatti), whose colour is yellow, is a small underground tramway inaugurated in 1896. The other three are full-sized metro lines: M2 (red), M3 (blue) and M4 (green). M2 and M4 run roughly east–west, while M3 runs mostly north–south. In 2005 a "BEB" monthly pass was introduced for a 10% extra cost over the regular price, which permitted the use of the MÁV national railway lines within the city area, effectively increasing the tracked service for BKV's passengers. Since 2009, all monthly (and 15-day) passes, now called the "Budapest-pass", are valid on the national railway and suburban bus lines within city boundaries.

== Passenger statistics ==
As of 2009, approximately 54% of the passenger traffic in Budapest, a city of 1.7 million inhabitants, is still carried by BKV vehicles, with the remaining 46% using private vehicles. During 2003, a total of 1.4 billion people travelled by BKV. During the Socialist era, Budapest had 2 million residents and its public vs. private transport ratio (the so-called modal split) was 80% : 20% in favor of mass transit. This ratio was a result of artificial restriction: COMECON rules did not allow Hungary to produce private cars domestically and Dacia / Lada / Škoda / Trabant / Wartburg (marque) car imports were never enough. (After the Iron Curtain fell, a large number of second hand cars were imported from Austria and Western Europe, leading to rapid private motorisation of Budapest's streets.)

== Funding ==
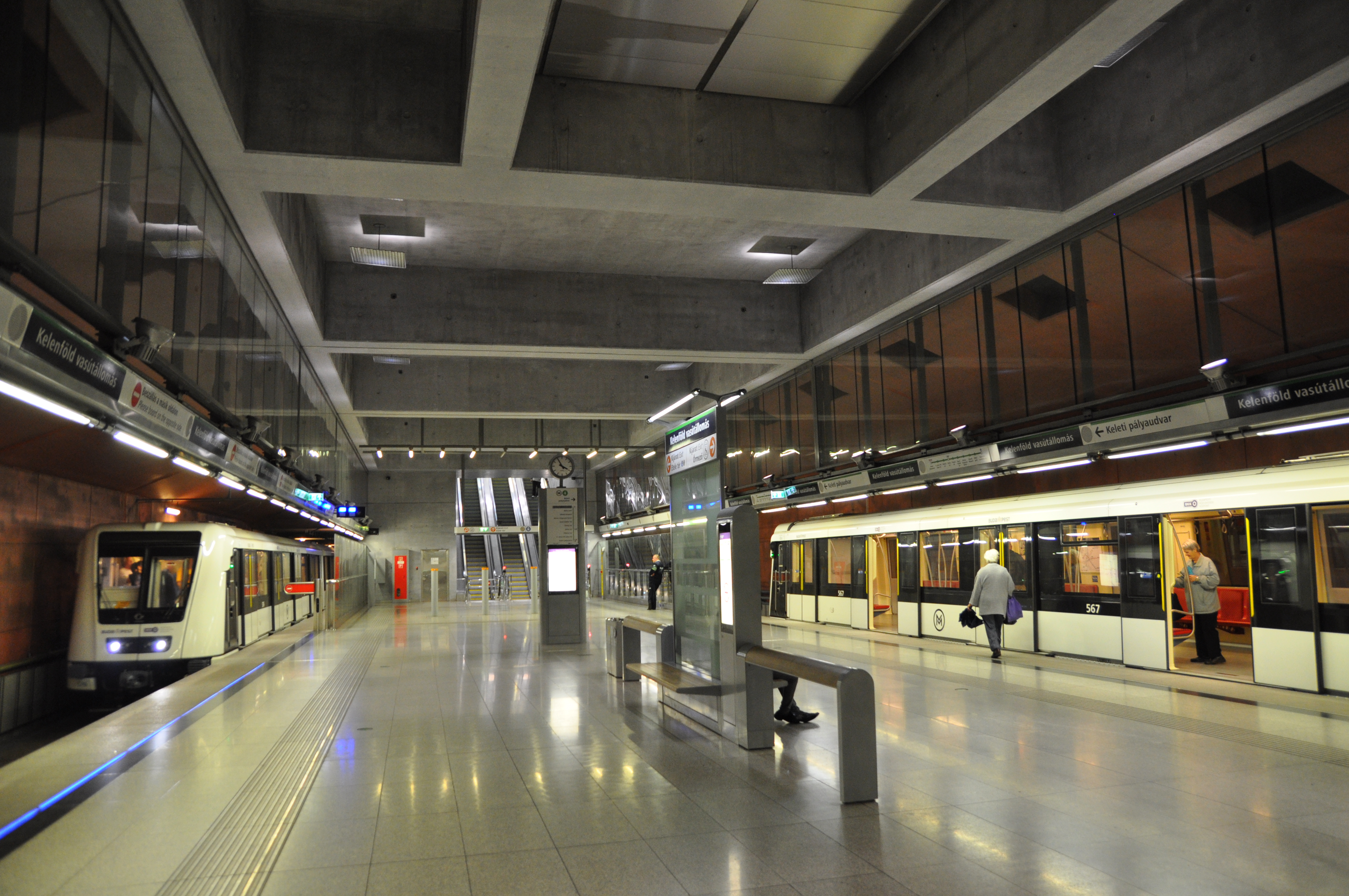
Metro Line M4 Kelenföld Railway station

After the fall of Communism, BKV was initially plagued by a lack of funding. It survived by selling some of its garages and repair bases for mall and housing development. By October 2009, the average BKV diesel bus was 16.5 years old and the oldest one of the 1,400 strong fleet was 24 years old, with 3.5 million kilometers to its track record. Yet starting in 2010, a bus replacement program scrapped most of those old buses and increased the ratio of modern, air-conditioned low-floor buses to 80% by 2016. Since November 2022, BKV operates only low-floor buses.

In 2006, Siemens Combino Supra trams completely replaced the carriages serving the Grand Boulevard. In the same year, French Alstom metro trains were ordered to replace all Soviet carriages on metro line M2 and to serve on metro line M4, the construction of which had started in that year. All units for both lines entered service by 2014, the same year in which 47 air-conditioned, low-floor CAF trams were purchased. BKV had the opportunity to purchase an additional 77 trams, which they did throughout the following years until 2023, when they purchased the last remaining trams. In 2016, the more than 30 years old Russian trains running on metro line M3, produced by Mytishchi Machine-building Factory, started to be refurbished by the legal successor Metrowagonmash. The first train arrived back in Budapest in May 2016, with the rest of the trains arriving throughout 2016 and 2017. On March 20, 2017 the first refurbished train began its journey on line M3. Since April 3, 2018 only renovated trains run on line M3.

BKV operates on a net-loss basis; state-mandated ticket prices cover less than 50% of running costs. The state circumvents European Union regulations by failing to fully compensate the BKV company for operating costs and amortization.

== Season tickets and passes ==
BKV uses a paper-based system of tickets and passes, but mobile tickets are also available on the BudapestGO app. As of 2025, a monthly Budapest-pass allowing one person to travel on any BKV vehicle costs 8,950 Hungarian forint (approximately €23, US$27). Pest County Passes (9,450 Ft for adults, 945 Ft for students), and Hungary Passes (18,900 Ft for adults, 1,890 Ft for students) are also valid inside Budapest. Children below 14, and the elderly travel free. Passes are not transferable.

On June 20, 2023, BKV introduced Budapest Pay&GO on bus line 100E (Airport Express). This method of ticket management had been planned for the entire transit system of Budapest for years, but only now is it materialized. It was expanded to metro line M1 in October 2023, and will be expanded to all other lines in early 2026, expected to cover most of the city by 2028.

=== Accessibility ===
All BKV buses are wheelchair accessible. There are also a few special small-sized BKV buses, which can be reserved by phone to transport a person using a wheelchair. Metro line M4 has public lifts installed in every station. Most of line M2's stations currently only have escalators, excluding Puskás Ferenc Stadion, Pillangó utca and Örs vezér tere, but all other stations are planned to have elevators installed in the future. Before its major renovation, line M3 only had elevators at Kőbánya-Kispest, but during the renovation, they were installed at every station. Line M1 is planned to be renovated, and equipped with elevators at every station.

Currently available regular service line with handicapped-compatible low-floor vehicles:

Metro

- line M1: Only stations Deák Ferenc tér, Széchenyi fürdő, Mexikói út (a disabled person has to ask for the operator of the wheelchair lift; lifts non-functional since at least 2009)
- line M2: Only stations Puskás Ferenc Stadion, Pillangó utca, Örs vezér tere
- line M3: All stations
- line M4: All stations

Tram

- 1: all vehicles at weekends (33-50% at weekdays)
- 3: most of the vehicles
- 4, 6: all vehicles
- 14: 2 vehicles at weekdays (50% at weekends)
- 17, 19: half of the vehicles
- 42: most vehicles
- 50: all vehicles
- 56/56A: half of the vehicles

Since November 2022, every bus line has low-floor buses, with trolleybus lines having low-floor buses most of the time.

== Description of major vehicle types used by BKV ==
=== Buses ===
==== Present fleet ====
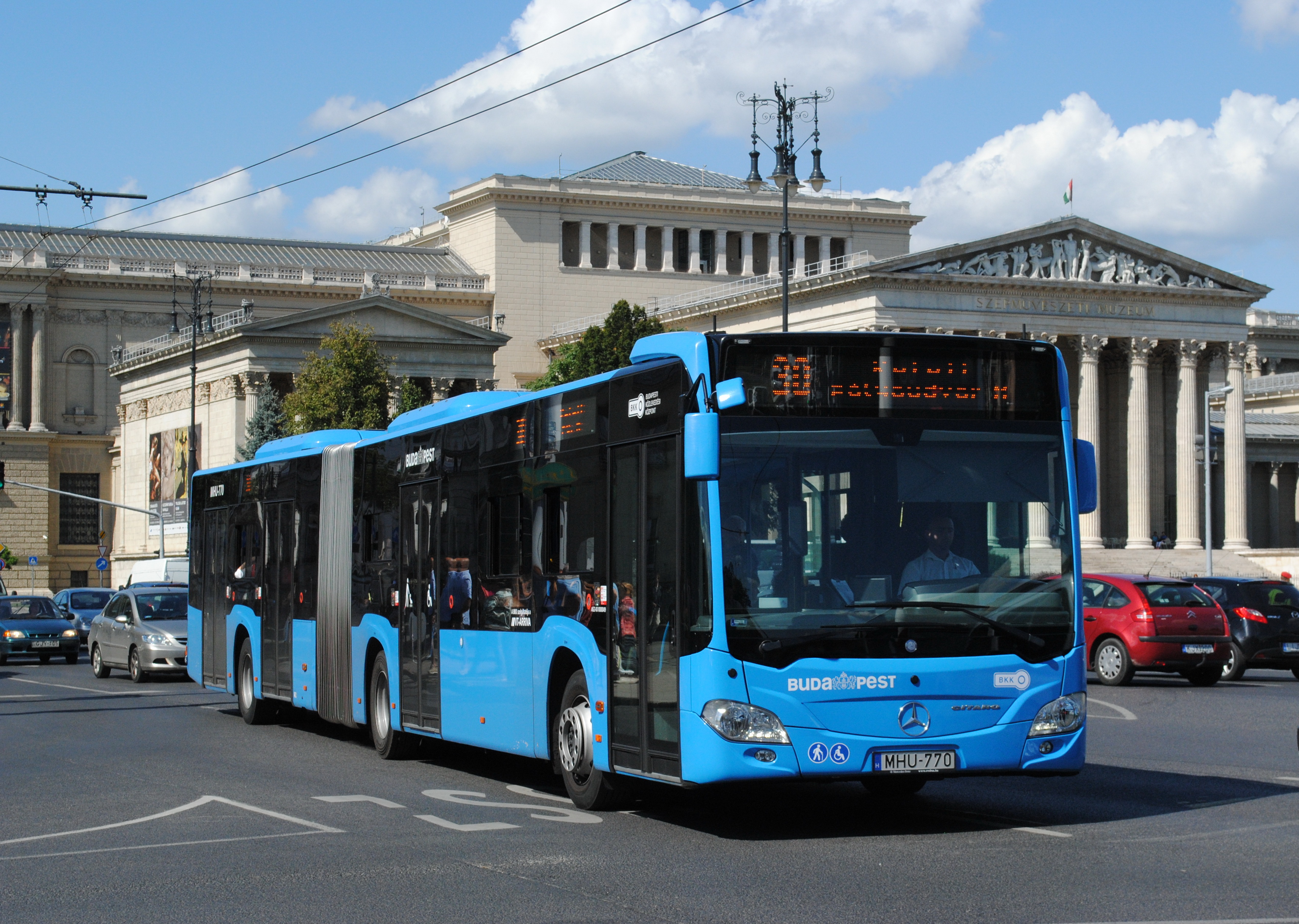
A Mercedes-Benz Citaro G at Heroes' Square

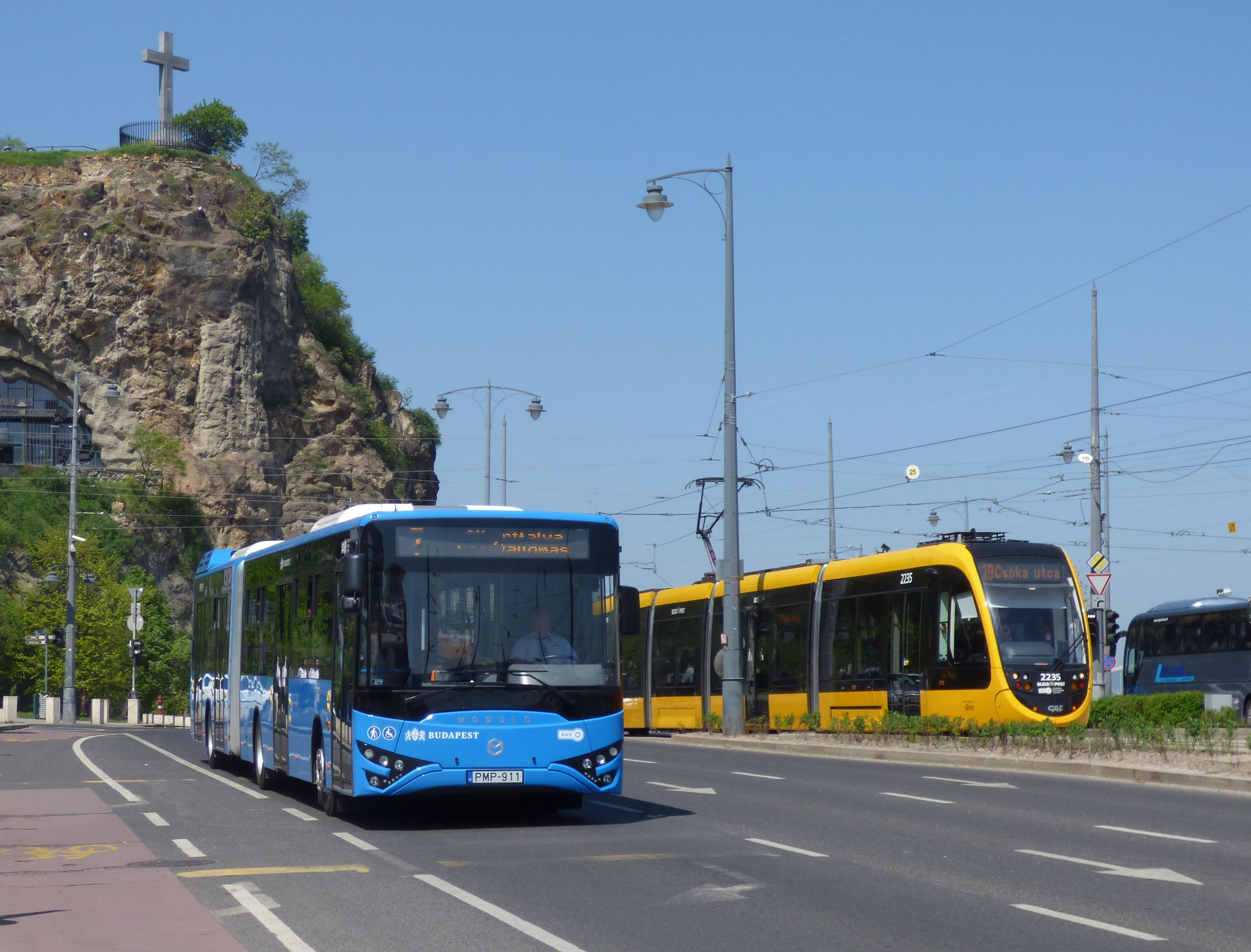
A Modulo M168d articulated bus on route 7 and a CAF Urbos 3 tram on route 19 at St. Gellért's Square

- Mercedes-Benz Citaro: Purchased and entered service in 2012, these buses were bought used from various Western-European cities. 12 metres (39 ft) long, entirely low-floor buses. As a result, from originating from different places, certain buses have major differences between each other. The ones manufactured the earliest are the C1 type, and are quite disliked because of their loud motors and doors. They are also notorious for catching on fire. All have been retrofitted with larger windows and the standard BKV colors. 150 brand new Citaro C2 and Citaro C2G buses were purchased in 2013, and were operated by ArrivaBus until the end of their contract in 2023, when apart from four instructor, one solo and one articulated bus, all were taken out of service, although some were bought back to serve BKV in 2024. Of these, 12 Citaro C2, and 11 Citaro C2G buses are in service as of January 2026. BKV purchased 21 CNG-powered Citaro C1's from Sweden in 2016, but similarly to the regular C1's, they were unreliable and eventually decided to take all buses out of service only 4 years after buying them. 56 Citaro C1 and C1 Facelift solo buses are in service under BKV as of March 2026.
- Mercedes-Benz Citaro K: 10.6 metres (35 ft) long midibuses, having entered service in October 2025. These buses were purchased exclusively for Budapest to replace the aging midibuses that served lesser frequented routes. All 65 of them are in service as of March 2026.
- Mercedes-Benz Conecto: German and Turkish made, 11.9 metres (39 ft) long, entirely low-floor buses. As of March 2026, there are 201 of these buses in service, having entered service between 2015 and 2022, making them the largest number of non-articulated buses in BKV's fleet. The ones that arrived in 2022 were the first buses in Budapest to be equipped with new registration plates, and new, white dot-matrix screens on the front and back on the bus, replacing the orange dot-matrix screens found on the majority of buses in Budapest.
- Mercedes-Benz Conecto G: German and Turkish made, 17.9 metres (59 ft) long, entirely low-floor buses, articulated version of the Mercedes-Benz Conecto. Similarly to the non-articulated version, these buses hold the title of the most articulated buses in BKV's fleet, with 230 in service as of March 2026. As a result, you can find them anywhere throughout Budapest. They first arrived in 2015, together with the non-articulated version with additional buses until 2022.
- Ikarus V127 / Modulo M108d: Built in PKD (partially knocked down kit) cooperation between MABI and BKV from 2014 to 2016. 12.7 metres (42 ft) long, entirely low-floor buses, non-articulated version of the Ikarus V187 / Modulo M168d. The first 18 were manufactured under the Ikarus brand, with the other 49 gaining the Modulo branding. The two versions have no differences but are equally criticized for being poorly built, together with the articulated version. 49 are in service as of March 2026.
- Ikarus V187 / Modulo M168d: Originally one, Hungarian-made, 18.75 meters (61.5 ft) long, entirely low-floor, articulated bus, built in 2009. The longest bus in BKV's fleet, and also the most environmentally friendly one at its time, fitted with a Euro-5 engine. In 2017, manufacturing of these buses resumed, now under the name Modulo M168d, and a redesigned front and back. 21 are in service as of March 2026.
- Volvo 7000: Built in Finland and Poland in 2002. BKV bought used Volvo 7000 vehicles from Berlin in 2015, where they had served 13 years. Originally 38 vehicles were put into service, but barely after two weeks after entering service one had already burnt down, with several more facing the same fate later on. 14 remain in service as of March 2026.
- Volvo 7700: Polish-made, built in 2004, the successor to the Volvo 7000. Similarly to its predecessor, BKV bought 38 used Volvo 7700 vehicles from Veldhoven in 2012 to replace Ikarus 412's in the hilly routes of Buda, where they ran unreliably. (The 412's were reassigned to generally flatter areas in Pest.) These Volvos finally entered service in late 2012. 26 are in service as of March 2026.
- Volvo 7700A: Polish-made, built specifically for Budapest, 17.9 meters (58.7 ft) long articulated buses, based on Swedish B7LA chassis. Considered a technological marvel by experts for cramming four double doors and a usable gangway into a fully low-floor vehicle with vertically mounted engine at the time. Current fleet of 78 arrived in three batches of fifty in 2004/2005/2006. During their service years, they have become liked vehicles because of their higher comfort level and quietness. All of them have automatic climate control (the first 50 were equipped with it later), which was unique to BKV's bus fleet at the time of their arrival. As of March 2026, 81 remain in service, with the majority of the first 50 (equipped with registration plates starting with FJX-xxx) having been taken out of service.
- Volvo 7700 / 7705 Hybrid: Two-axle, 11.9 metres (39 ft) long hybrid buses were bought used from several different countries, and entered service between 2018 to 2019. As a result of their mixed origins, they differer from one another, with some being equipped with two, and other with three doors. They mostly serve the eastern districts and suburbs. 27 are in service as of March 2026.
- Volvo 7900 / 7905 Hybrid: Polish-made, 12.1 metres (40 ft) long hybrid buses, having entered service between 2018 and 2019. 12 vehicles were originally bought from Austria and Switzerland, of which 8 operate as of March 2026.
- Van Hool A300, A330, newA330: 13 Belgian-made, 12 meters (39.4 ft) long low-floor A300 buses, built between 2000 and 2001 were bought by BKV in 2011 from Nijmegen. At BKV they were equipped with automatic climate control and repainted in BKV's signature blue livery. A further 66 Van Hool A330 and newA330 buses were purchased from Dijon and Lausanne, with some being powered by CNG and equipped with automatic climate control. All models combined; 37 newA330 CNG, and 2 newA330 models are in service as of March 2026.
- Van Hool AG300: Belgian-made, 18 meters (59.1 ft) long articulated bus, the articulated version of the A300. The AG300 is a special type of fully low-floor bus - the engine is located between the first and the second axles, so the third axle can be steered. 32 of them were bought by BKV in the summer of 2009 to ease the lack of modern vehicles, of which 11 remain in service as of January 2026. They were built in 2000-2001 and used in Brussels. At BKV they were equipped with automatic climate control, and were repainted into standard colors in 2013. 25 more were purchased in 2015 from Utrecht, with 19 other additional buses purchased later from varying operators including Lausanne, with these being the newer newAG300. Passengers noticed them for narrow inner space of the fore part, although the back has rather a large standee place. 37 newAG300 buses are in service as of March 2026.
- Solaris Urbino 10: Polish made, 10 metres (33 ft) long low-floor midibuses, having entered service sporadically from 2017 to 2024. These buses mostly serve less frequented routes in the suburbs. 11 are in service as of March 2026.
- Karsan Atak: Turkish-made, 8 metres (26 ft) long partially low-floor midibuses, that were ordered to replace the aging Ikarus 405 buses on the routes around Buda Castle. As of March 2026, 15 remain in service, but are very controversial due to their flammable nature.
- Modulo Medio Electric: Hungarian-made, 8 metres (26 ft) long low-floor electric midibuses. The first prototype was shown in 2014, with 20 buses entering service in 2016. Similarly to the Karsan Atak buses, these mostly serve the Buda Castle, but also occasionally less populated suburban routes. As with other midibuses, these are also prone to catching flames, and combined with their poor built quality and lack of sufficient spare parts, they were criticized from the first moment. 6 remain in service as of March 2026.
- Renault Master / Vehixel Cytios 3 / Mercedes-Benz Sprinter: Serving routes exclusively pre-reserved by phonecalls, these microbuses appeal to elderly or disabled people. Only a small amount of them are in service, as not many of these routes exist yet. All models combined; 14 are in service as of March 2026, with most having been bought used.

==== Former types ====
- Ikarus 260: Hungarian made, 11 meters (36.1 ft) long, entirely high-floor buses, built from 1971 to 2002. Considered the "workhorse", it negotiated poor road conditions and heavy use easily, but passengers suffered a lot of noise and vibration from the under-floor mounted engine. Their age often caused concern both among laymen and experts, but their exceptionally sturdy and serviceable build allowed them to reach an age of approximately 30 years. The last remaining vehicles were taken out service in November 2022.
- Ikarus 263: Hungarian made, 12 meters (39.4 ft) long, entirely high-floor buses, built from 1999 to 2001. A longer and more modern version of Ikarus 260.
- Ikarus 280: Hungarian made articulated version of the Ikarus 260, built from 1973 to 2003. Some of the fleet were entirely rebuilt in 1997 and painted in red-blue livery for use on 7-173 express routes, but from 2008 onward, they were painted back in the standard blue. The last remaining vehicles were taken out service in November 2022.
- Ikarus 405: Hungarian made and without rear passenger doors, 7.3 meters (24 ft) long, partially low-floor midibuses for weight-restricted routes, such as the Castle District and Gellért Hill. Manufactured in 1995. The design was extremely compact, which resulted in a cramped passenger compartment. Equipped with fragile independent front suspension, it was prone to roll, but was still expected to run on hilly routes, for lack of a replacement. The reduced size of the front passenger doors could cause problems during peak hours. Most Ikarus 405 vehicles had tilted, 3 shade green striping painted at the front and back, except for those rebuilt in 2011 and 2012, which had blue-grey two-tone paint schemes instead. The last remaining vehicles were taken out service in January 2023.
- Ikarus 412: Hungarian-made, 12 meters (39.4 ft) long, entirely low-floor buses; built from 1999 to 2001. The type was a serious failure, manufactured during the final decline of the Ikarus company; literally no two vehicles were identical in the 412 fleet. A number of vehicles were refurbished between 2010 and 2011. Several engine compartment fires forced BKV to rebuild the propulsion cells and the chassis is still prone to fracture. Suffered from narrower rear door and gangway, which could cause problems during peak hours. All were later repainted to sky blue to match other bus types. The last remaining buses were taken out of service at the end of 2025.
- Ikarus 415: Hungarian made, 11.4 meters (37 ft) long, built from 1987 to 2002. Their rear-mounted DAF diesel engines were famous for their terrible roar, scaring passers-by, but the cab was quieter. The reduced size of the rear passenger doors on the later models could cause problems during peak hours. Almost all Ikarus 415 vehicles originally had tilted, 3 shade green striping at the front and rear, though the stripes had been removed from many of them during maintenance.
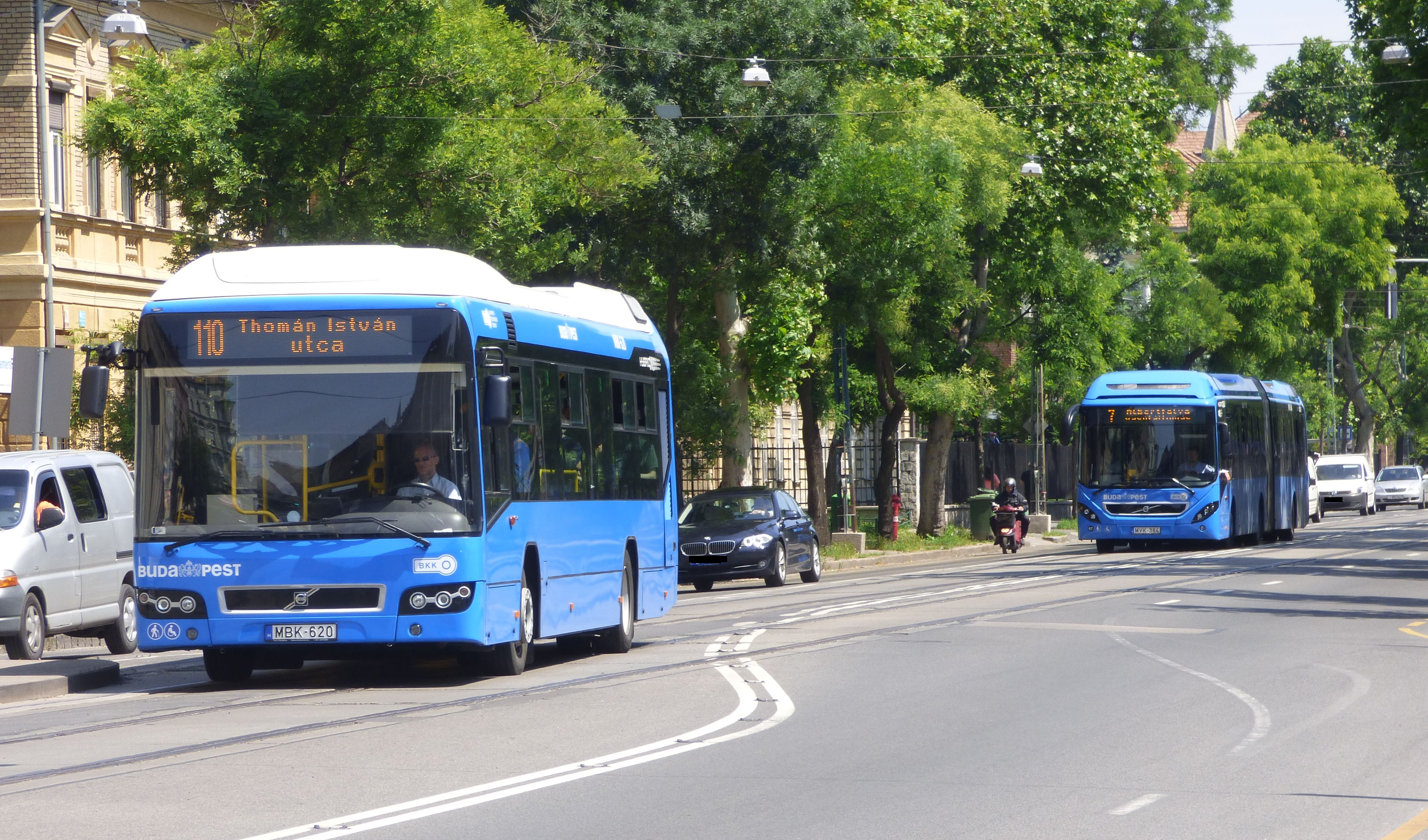
  Two of BKV's 68 hybrid buses
  The last remaining vehicles were taken out service in June 2022.
- Ikarus 435: Hungarian made, 17.9 meters (59 ft) long articulated version of Ikarus 415; built from 1985 to 2002. Initially equipped with pusher-type articulated drive, they suffered a lot of technical problems and struggled with chassis weaknesses until the end. The reduced size of the last pair of passenger doors could cause problems during peak hours. They were generally liked by passengers, as their 735 mm (28.94 in) high floor was lower than the Ikarus 200 series' 960 mm (37.8 in) very high floor level. Along with the Ikarus 280 and Volvo 7700A, the Ikarus 435 was the workhorse of the BKV bus fleet. It was common to see rebuilt versions around the city. These vehicles had tilted, 3 shade green stripes at the front and back, which was gradually phased out in repaints, as with Ikarus 415 and Ikarus 405 buses. The last remaining vehicles were taken out service in November 2022.
- Ikarus E91: Hungarian-made, 7.9 metres (26 ft) long midibuses, bought from Riga, where they served from 2001 to 2019, and later entered service in 2020 in Budapest. They were taken out of service at the end of 2025.
- Renault Agora: Branded as "Ikarus Agora" by the manufacturer Renault-Irisbus (the owner of Ikarus at the time of purchase), this 18 meters (59 ft) long low-floor, articulated bus was not really an Ikarus, but rather a French-made vehicle rebranded to improve public perception. Only one bus was in service, given to BKV by Irisbus as compensation for delayed shipments and was taken out of service on 1 July 2019.

ArrivaBus (formerly known as VT-Transman, later on VT-Arriva) is one of BKK's contractors running some routes with their own vehicles, but those vehicles have blue-grey painting like BKV's, and they are completely integrated in BKK system. Volánbusz and its subcontractors runs suburban lines. but they are members of Budapest Transport Organization (BKSZ), so their lines can be used by regular tickets inside the city (300-859 routes and 2xxx routes).

=== Trolleybuses ===
==== Present fleet ====
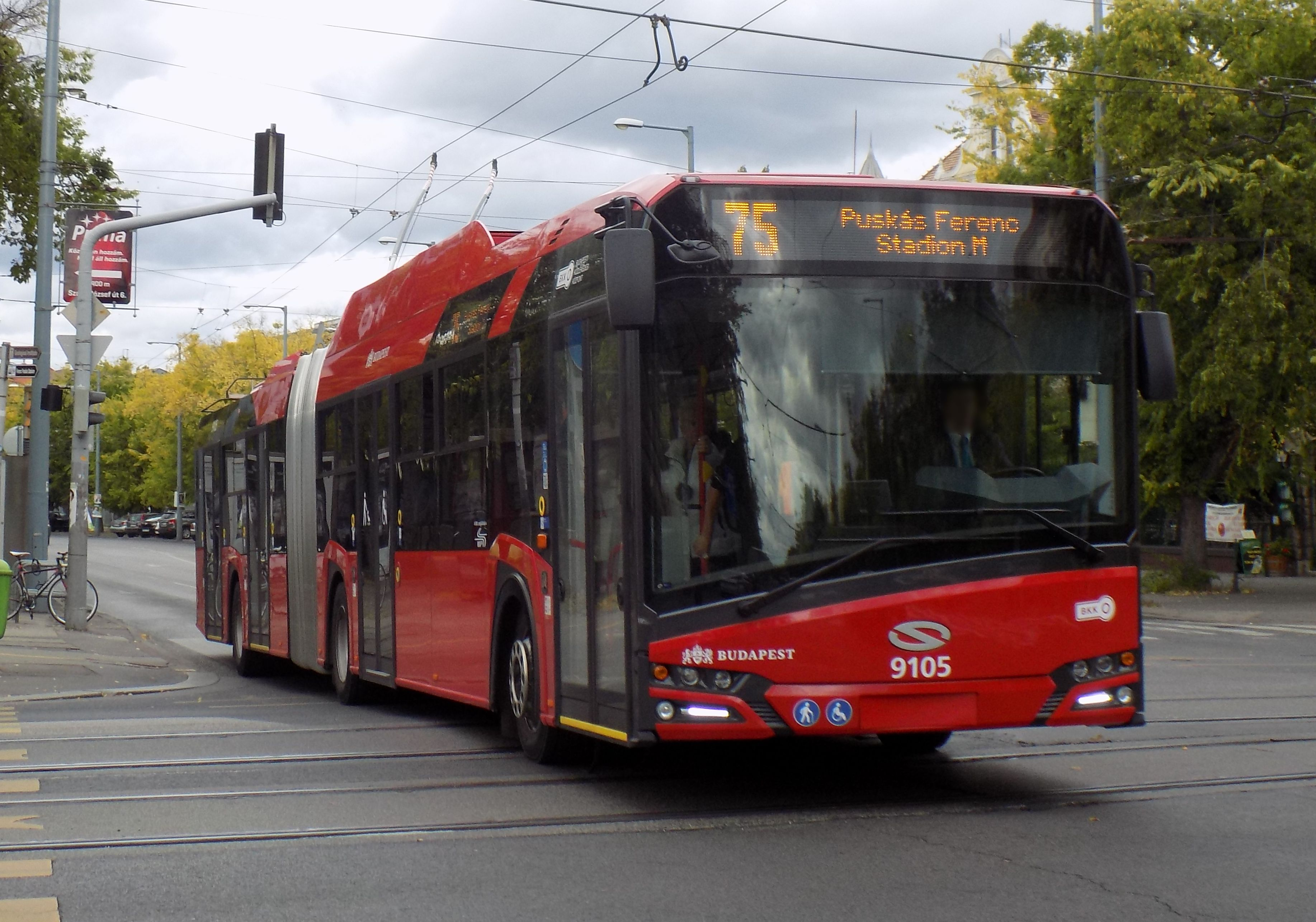
Solaris Trollino 4th Gen articulated trolleybus on Line 75

- Ikarus 280T: Ikarus 280 articulated body equipped with Ganz chopper-based electronics. Commonly referred to as "GVM", as in "Ganz Villamossági Művek", the place where they were modified. As of March 2026, there are only eight of these trolleybuses left in service, mostly only serving in peak hours and have been rumored to be taken out of service in the near future.
- Ikarus 411T / 412T: The 412T is a 12 m (39.4 ft) long low floor Ikarus 412 body equipped with Kiepe electronics. Limited fleet, resulting from the collapse of Ikarus and BKV's lack of funds during the late 1990s. The similar-looking, 11 m long 411T is, however, a unique vehicle which is a couple of years older: it was an Ikarus test trolleybus, and later it was transferred to BKV as a compensation for delayed shipments. In 2023, six Ikarus 412T trolleybuses were taken out of service. As of January 2026, there are two original Ikarus 412T trolleybuses in BKV's fleet, and one that was built from an Ikarus 412 body.
- Solaris Trollino: Polish-made, fully low-floor 12-meter (39.4 ft) buses designed as genuine ETB vehicles. The first generation was made in collaboration between Ganz and Solaris, and 16 buses arrived between 2005 and 2007, with nine additional trolleybuses arriving from Naples in 2024. As of January 2026, there are 21 Ganz-Solaris Trollino trolleybuses in service. Following the fiscal collapse of the Ganz Transelektro Group, the local co-manufacturer, the delivery of the second series was delayed for several months, and was finalized by Škoda, the new owner of Ganz Transelektro. In 2015, 36 new, Škoda-Solaris Trollino trolleybuses arrived, of which 12 were 18 metres (59 ft) long, with an articulated body. In 2019, 21 new trolleybuses arrived, with new ones arriving in 2023. As of January 2026, there are a total of 108 Škoda-Solaris Trollino trolleybuses serving Budapest, making them by far the most common type.

==== Former types ====
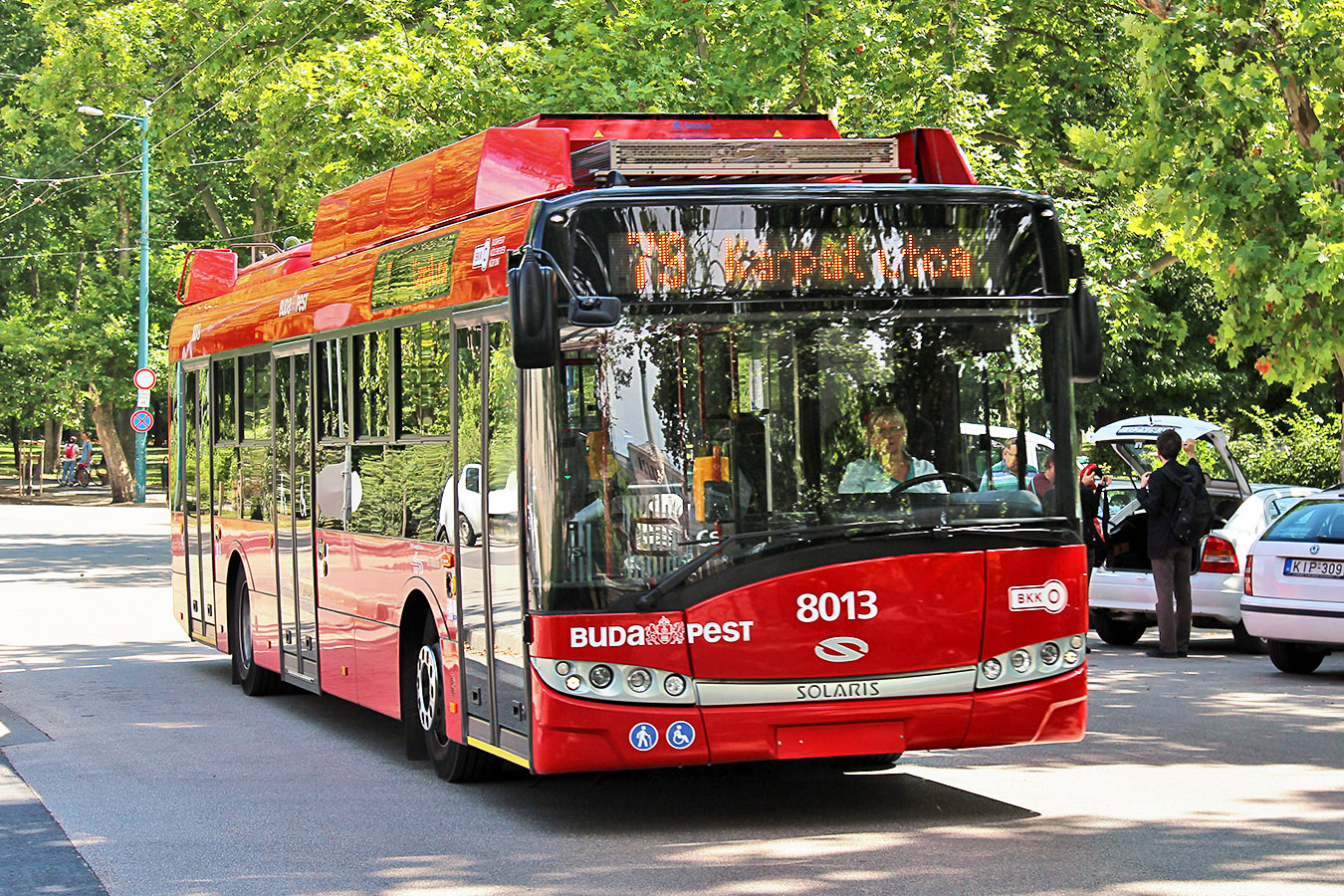
Solaris Trollino 3rd Gen trolleybus on line 79

- ZiU-9: Withdrawn from service at the end of 2012, these 11.8-meter (38.7 ft) Soviet-made vehicles had partial semi-low floor at the rear. The age of fleet was 28–34 years, and the vehicles had suffered from rust as well as degraded insulation of the electric drive system.
- Ikarus 435T: Ikarus 435 articulated body equipped with Kiepe electronics. The last remaining vehicles were taken out of service in February and March 2023, with one vehicle reserved for historical purposes.
- Gräf&Stift MAN NGE-152: Low-floor, articulated trolley buses bought used from the city of Eberswalde to replace the aging ZiU fleet. The last remaining vehicle was taken out of service in June 2025.

=== Trams ===
==== Present fleet ====
- Ganz CSMG: Commonly called ICS (abbreviation of Ipari Csuklós, in English: Industrial Articulated), built by Ganz between 1967 and 1978 in Hungary, 26 meters (85.3 ft) long, high-floor, double-articulated, 8 axle tram. Nowadays, they run exclusively single, but before the modern Combino trams, they ran in pairs on lines 4 and 6. Similarly narrow-bodied as the UV type, they can be used on any BKV tram route, but only regularly serve routes 2, 47, 48 and 49. The name "Industrial" was used to distinguish the trams from the earlier "home-made" articulated trams (commonly known as "Bengáli", no longer in service), as these trams were made by the Ganz-MÁVAG factories, unlike the Bengáli trams, which were made by FVV (Fővárosi Villamosvasút, in English: Capital Tram Railway), BKV's predecessor. As of September 2025, only 37 trams operate of the original fleet, with some having received refurbishment, making it look similar to its successor, the KCSV-7.
- KCSV-7: 30 ICS trams were re-bodied and rebuilt by Ganz-Ansaldo between 1996 and 1999, with passenger compartment heating, information systems, proper screens that show the destination from outside (formerly using paper as said screens) and modernized engines. KCSV stands for Közúti Csuklós Villamos or Korszerűsített Csuklós Villamos (English: Articulated Tram for Public Road or Modernized Articulated Tram).They serve routes 2, 2B, 23 and 24.

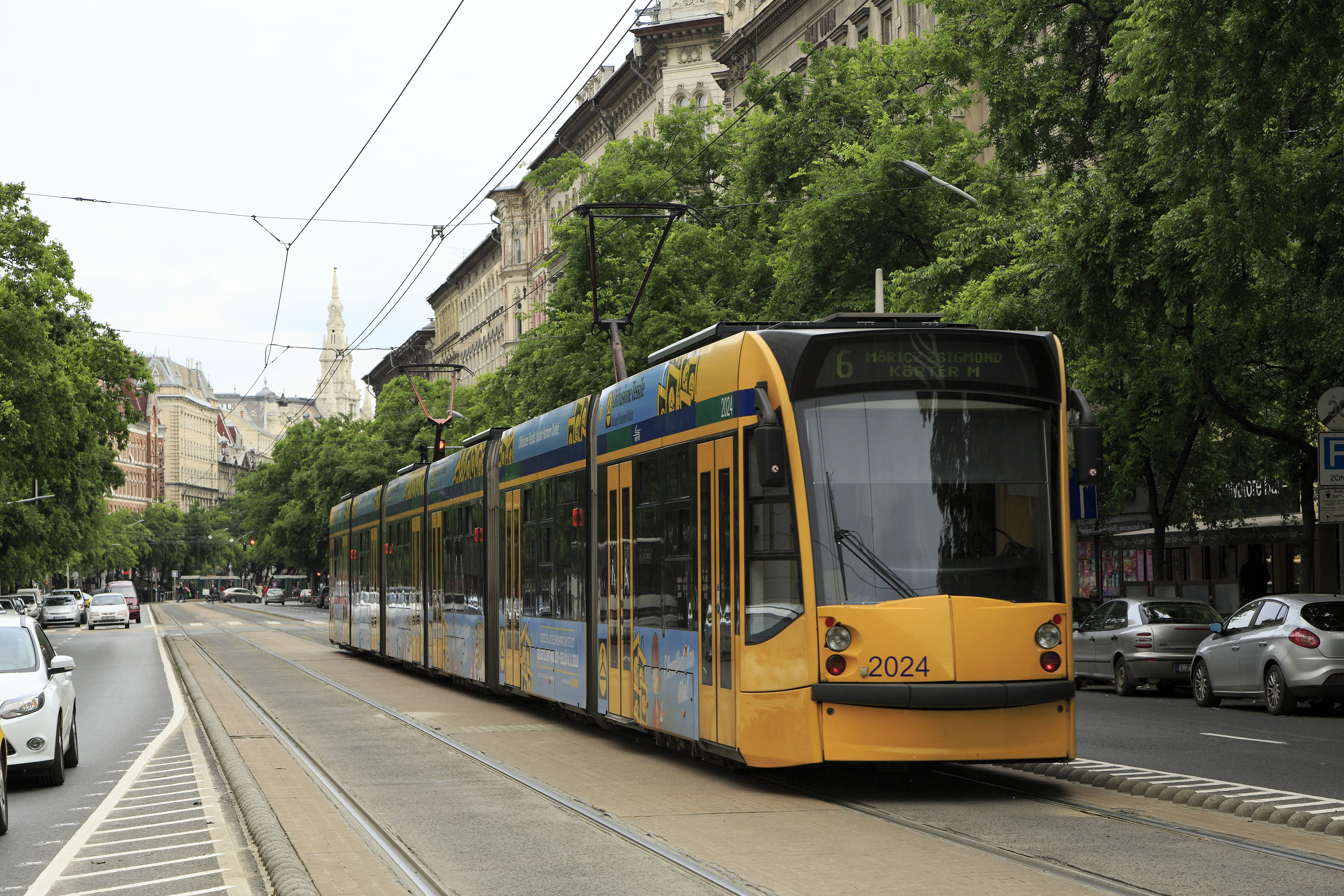
Siemens Combino Supra tram on Elizabeth Boulevard

- ČKD Tatra T5C5: Made in Czechoslovakia from 1978 to 1984, 14.7 meters (48.23 ft) long, high-floor trams. They mostly run in pairs, apart from lines 1 and 14, where they run in triples. They are comfortable but their wider superstructure limits the lines they can serve. Nowadays, there are only a small number of these trams in their original form as most have been refurbished throughout the years. The original trams only operate on routes 1 and 1A.
- ČKD-BKV T5C5K, T5C5K2, T5C5K2M: From 2002 to 2004, 80 T5C5 trams went under refurbishment and were suited with up-to-date electronics; the white interior was repainted orange, and domestically made FOK-GYEM displays (flip-disc technology) were installed on the front of the trams. These displays were also installed inside the trams, and were equipped with an audible information system. Additional door opening buttons were installed inside, and on the outside of the tram. The model number of these trams became T5C5K, (the "K" stands for "korszerűsített", in English: modernized) and were not compatible with older T5C5 trams. From 2009 to 2013, these refurbished trams began to be equipped with automatic door closing, which was especially useful during winter to keep the trams warm. These trams became T5C5K2, and were neither compatible with T5C5 or T5C5K trams. Starting in 2014, the majority of the original, not yet refurbished trams, and the already refurbished, but outdated trams started to be refurbished again. The electronics were improved even more from the original T5C5K, and T5C5K2, the interior was repainted in favor of a more tame, white-yellow color scheme. The outdated and often buggy FOK-GYEM displays were replaced by somewhat more modern dot-matrix displays. The trams were also equipped with BKV's FUTÁR system, which allowed the tram to communicate with BKK, and replace the displayed information on-the-fly. These newly refurbished trams became T5C5K2M, and were compatible with the older T5C5K2s, but not with the T5C5Ks or the T5C5s. The trams continued to be refurbished, and from 2016 onward, tinted windows were installed. Finally, starting October 2022, apart from four trams reserved for historical purposes, all trams will be refurbished to be T5C5K2Ms.
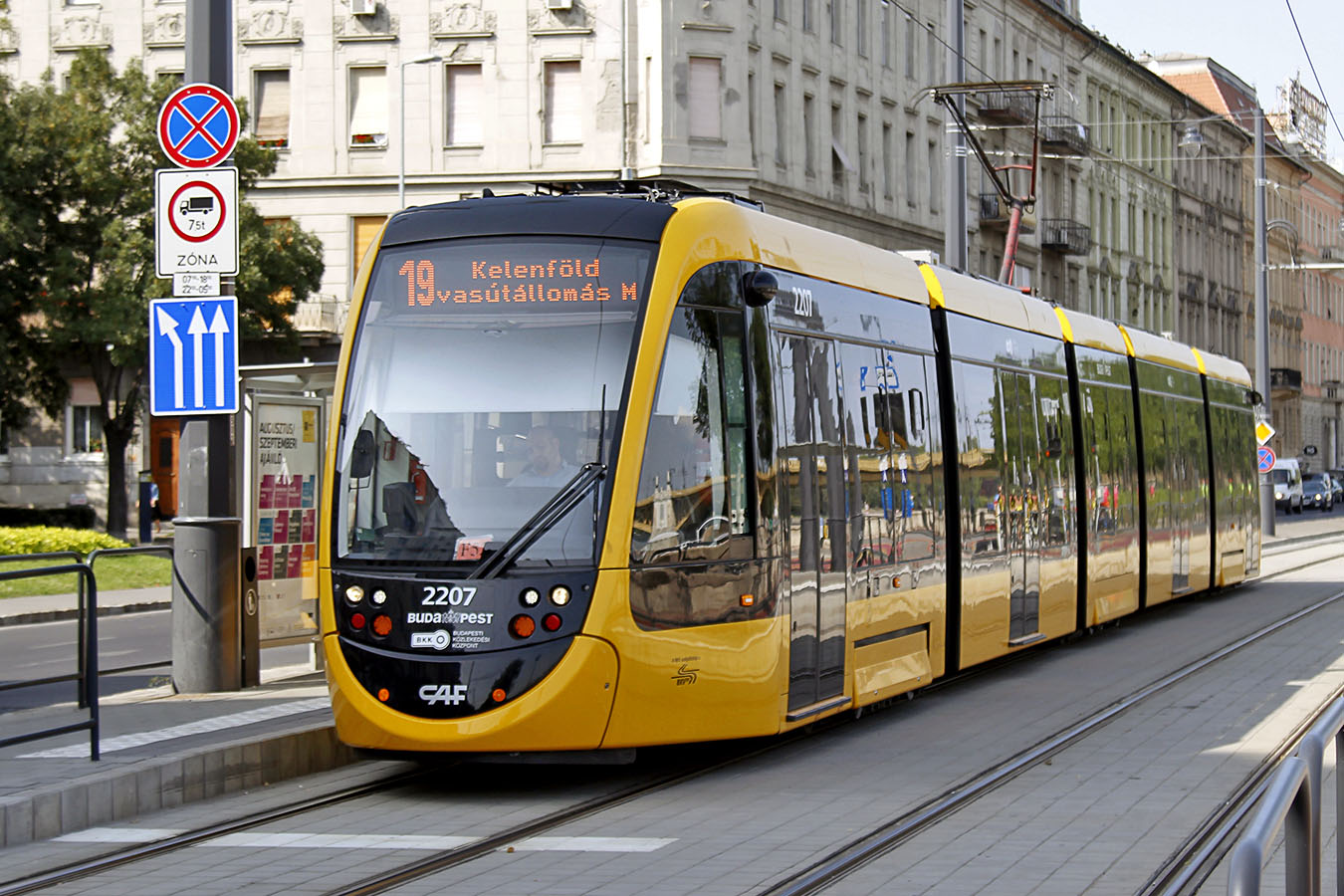
  CAF Urbos tram on Line 19
- Duewag TW 6000: Manufactured in West Germany between 1972 and 1973, very high floor trams, purchased in 2002 refurbished from the city of Hannover. These 28 metres (92 ft) long vehicles only run as singles and are noted for their extremely quiet run (which did cause some minor accidents initially). Originally designed to serve as light-rail trains, the TW6000 vehicles have a variable door-well feature, which could serve tram stops in a step-free entry configuration, but was never utilized. In 2021, a prototype with modified stairs, removing the variable door feature was built. Starting in 2023, more trams continued to be retrofitted with these stairs. All trams between number 1600 and 1624 are rumored to be get the modified stairs in the future.
- Siemens Combino Supra: Redesigned (constructed of steel instead of the originally proposed aluminium) version of the previously controversial Siemens Combino, made in 2005–2007 in Austria, fully ultra low floor trams of a special, 54 meter (177.2 ft) long, six module design (intended only for Budapest). Up until the arrival of the newer, CAF Urbos 3 trams of Budapest, they were the longest passenger trams of the world. Currently serving lines 4 and 6 exclusively, with some servicing line 1 but only on weekends.
- CAF Urbos 3: After a dispute over the contract for new Budapest trams between Škoda and CAF, the latter company won the tender to supply the trams for Budapest. 37 were originally ordered, but this was increased to 47. There was also an option of a further 77 trams. 35 of the trams are 5-section 34 metre long trams for lines 3, 17 and 19, while 12 are 56 metre 9-section trams for line 1. The first arrived in Budapest in March 2015, and all were delivered by Summer 2016. The first 34-meter version entered service on line 3 in September 2015, with the first 56-meter version entering service in March 2016 on line 1. In 2019, 26 new trams arrived, five 56-meter versions for line 1 and 21 34-meter versions, originally intended to be on lines 50 and 59/59A, but later operated on lines 17 and 19 instead. In 2022, of the remaining 51 trams, 20 were purchased, with the first one entering service in March 2025. In February 2023, a government decision led to BKK purchasing the remaining 31 trams. The 54-meter versions currently operate on line 1 exclusively, with the 34-meter versions operating on lines 3, 14, 17, 19, 41, 42, 50, 51A, 56, 56A, 61 and 69 as of September 2025.

==== Former types ====
- UV, (Series "U", remote controlled "távVezérelt"): built domestically during 1956–1965, based on pre-World War II designs and without heating. These cars were quite popular among tram enthusiasts around the world. When BKV celebrated its 50 years of service, an elaborate "UV Day" parade was one of the items. They usually ran in pairs, or pairs sandwiching a trailer (some of which were built in 1939). These cars were narrower than many of the later types, so that they fit the whole network including some tunnels. Despite this, they were taken out of service in 2007, as the new Combino trams replaced the ICS trams operating on lines 4 and 6, which freed them and allowed them to operate on lines where the very outdated UV trams ran.

=== Other trains ===
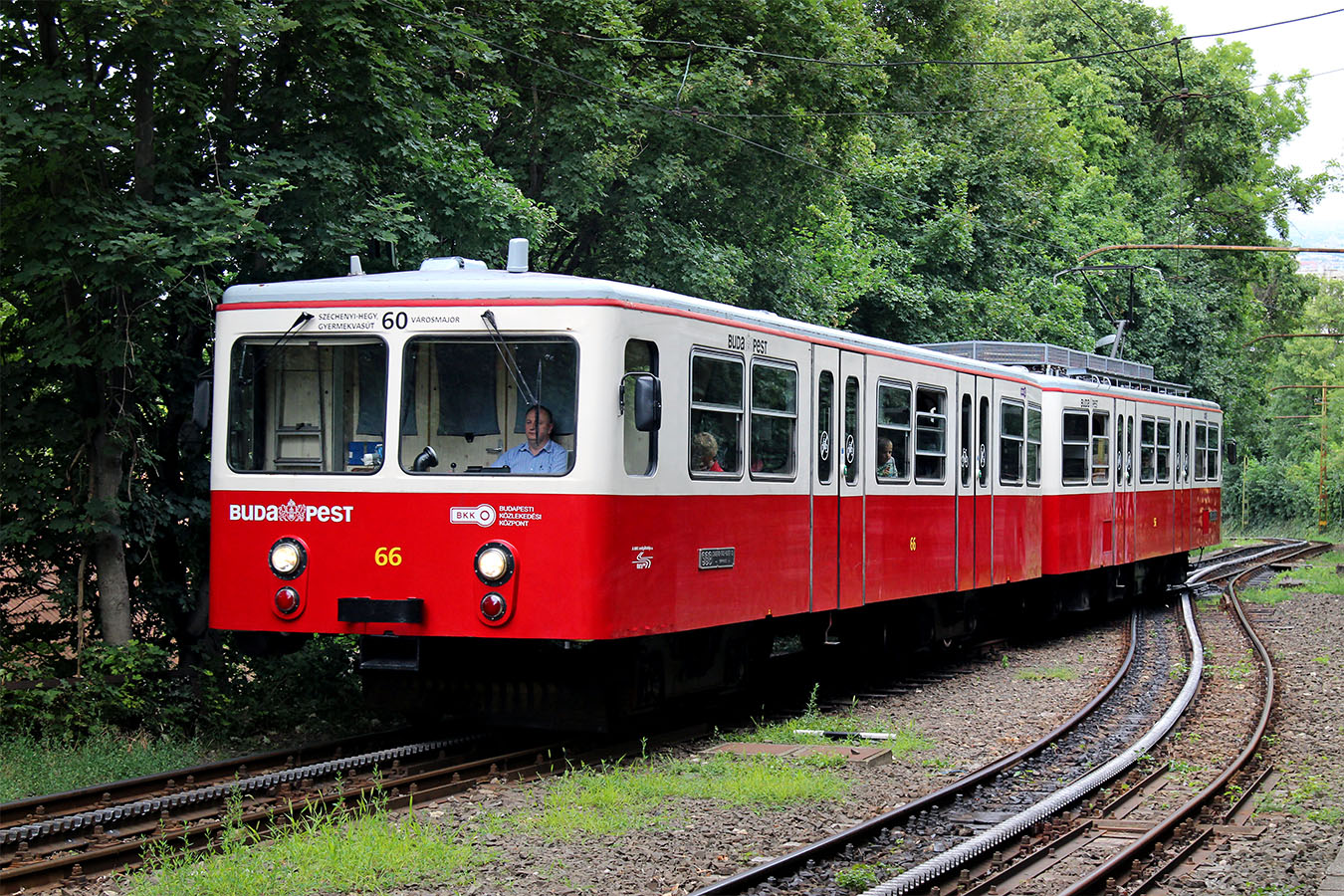
Cogwheel train in the Buda hills

- Cogwheel Railway: 1970s era red carriages built by SGP of Austria are currently in service, but civil organizations are pushing for their replacement as well as the reconstruction of the entire track, which is unlikely to happen in near future, because of the cost.
- MFAV (Milleniumi Földalatti Vasút, in English: Millennium Underground Railway): Domestically built double-articulated carriages from 1973 that run exclusively on line M1. Loosely based on the ICS tram technology, they feature three small carriages per set, in a fully low floor configuration. Planned to be replaced in the near future, MFAV vehicles are noted for high maintenance requirements, dictated by the cramped engine nacelles (needed to fit the tiny 100-year-old tunnel).
- Underground: Until 2013, both lines M2 and M3 were served by 81-717/714 and Ev/Ev3/EvA 5- or 6-carriage trains of Soviet origin. These Mytishchi Factory-built metro vehicles were noisy, consumed too much power and showed a lot of wear after 25+ years of service. Nine trains were refurbished from 2000 to 2003, which gave these carriages a pink interior and aforementioned FOK-GYEM displays inside, and on the carriages, but this did not significantly improve passenger comfort. As a result, BKV bought 37 Alstom Metropolis carriages for the lines M2 and M4. There were some problems about the delivery, and in March 2010, BKV CEO István Kocsis declared that BKV may cancel the contract with Alstom because of so many delays and problems (the new carriages should have been serving on line M2 since February 2009, but they weren't yet). All soviet trains older than 30 years old (in total 43 carriages) were withdrawn from service after a serious fire broke out on line M3 which had no fatalities, but the first two carriages of the train were destroyed. (A peculiarity is that most of the withdrawn carriages were of a different type than the destroyed train, and a large quantity of them were already refurbished.) The Alstom Metropolis trains soon got the go ahead begin testings in the summer of 2012. The first train entered service on September 7, 2012 on line M2. All of the old Soviet-built metro trains on line M2 were taken out of service on April 30, 2013. Some of these were transferred to line M3 to increase capacity, but most were scrapped. All Soviet-built trains were heavily refurbished from 2016 to 2017 by Metrowagonmash. They were repainted black and white, earning the nickname "Panda"; the original bench-style seats were replaced in favor of separate seats, the interior was repainted from green to white and the door-opening mechanism was replaced with a more modern one. Digital LED screen were installed that display the next stations and transfer options, the control panel was also replaced completely, separators were installed between the carriages and the front of the trains were redesigned. These trains got the model number 81-717.2K/714.2K. The trains barely resembled the original ones and were criticized from the moment they arrived, with people questioning if they were even refurbished or if Metrowagonmash had just sent back new trains. In 2025, BKV admitted that Metrovagonmash indeed had only refurbished the insides of the trains, with the exterior having been re-manufactured. In the beginning of the refurbished carriages' operation, they were very problematic. As a result, in June 2017, BKV announced, that they had submitted a severance pay demand fee of 800,000,000 Ft. They demanded the immediate fix of said problems. In February 2019, with no result, BKV filed a lawsuit against Metrowagonmash, now demanding 6,000,000,000 Ft. In January 2020, one of the first carriages that was refurbished had to be taken out of service, as the floor panel had gotten so rusty, that BKV was afraid it was going to give in. This had to be repaired free of charge, with compensation paid by Metrowagonmash, but as they didn't pay, the lawsuit continued. The documents regarding the lawsuit were sent out in 2019 to the Russian Ministry of Justice, but Metrowagonmash only received it in June 2023. With this, BKV will be demanding 14,000,000,000 Ft from Metrovagonmash.

=== Miscellaneous vehicles ===
- Massive yellow-blue trucks and orange-painted lorries are used by BKV to repair overhead wires. They are equipped with blue rotating lights and sirens and are thus authorized to ignore road traffic regulations when dealing with an emergency.
- Orange minivans and white Renault trucks are used to repair buses on site, these only have orange warning lights.

== Livery and colours ==
BKV paints its vehicles different colours by type.

- Trams: yellow
- HÉV vehicles: green and white
- Trolleybuses: red
- Buses: sky blue
- Night buses: sky blue (black on timetable)

Originally the buses had a dark shade of blue, most of the vehicles were repainted in the mid-2010s to match the today used lighter blue shade. With the removal of the old Ikarus buses from the roads of Budapest, this older, darker blue has disappeared from Budapest.

The four metro lines are marked on the map in different colours:

- M1: yellow
- M2: red
- M3: blue
- M4: green

The current livery of the trains on the M2, M3 and M4 lines are white-black, on M1 vehicles are painted yellow, though until recently the trains on M2 and M3 lines were blue (shade between the buses' former and current color).

== Corruption scandal ==
In 2009-2010 investigations into corruption led the police examine all money logs and contracts of the 20-year period individually, to find issues unrelated to the already detected ones. Many high-level employees and independent or in-company participants were arrested and sentenced. This issue led the owner, the Local Government of the Capital City making BKV accept a new Company Inner Regulation System and its assembly enacting local government degrees guaranteeing complete transparency in the contracts, billings, and job descriptions for the owner, and for all representatives of its assembly even individually. This regulation was extended to all enterprises owned in majority by the city council.

== In popular culture ==
A surrealistic thriller titled Kontroll was filmed in the M2 and M3 metro tunnels during 2002–2003. The movie has won several awards and has developed a cult following. The ironic beginning of the movie features Botond Aba, former CEO of BKV, who declares that all events and locations shown in the film are purely fictional.
