= UV (disambiguation) =

UV usually refers to ultraviolet radiation.

UV or uv may also refer to:

== Universities ==
- University of Valencia, Spain
- University of Valparaíso, Chile
- University of Victoria, Canada
- University of Vienna, Austria
- University of Vermont, United States
- University of Virginia, United States
- University of the Visayas, Philippines

== Political parties ==
- New Alternative (Finnish: Uusi vaihtoehto), a parliamentary group in Finland
- Valdostan Union, Italy
- Young Liberals of Norway

== Other uses ==
- Ulster Volunteers, a unionist, loyalist paramilitary organisation
- Burkina Faso, LOC MARC code and obsolete FIPS and NATO country codes
- Ganz UV, a Hungarian tram type
- UV mapping, the 3D modeling process of making a 2D image representation of a 3D model
- Unique visitor, a unit for measuring the popularity of a website, often used by the advertising industry
- Unmanned vehicle
- UV, a Korean hip-hop duo starring Yoo Se-yoon and Muzie
- UV Vodka, a brand produced by Phillips Distilling Company
- SM U-5 (Austria-Hungary) (or U-V), the lead boat of the U-5 class of submarines of the Austro-Hungarian Navy
- UV (album)
- Utility vehicle
- UV sex determination, the chromosomal system for some bryophyte and algae species
- UV Televisión, an Ecuadorian television channel

== See also ==
- Ultraviolet (disambiguation)
