= Ganz UV =

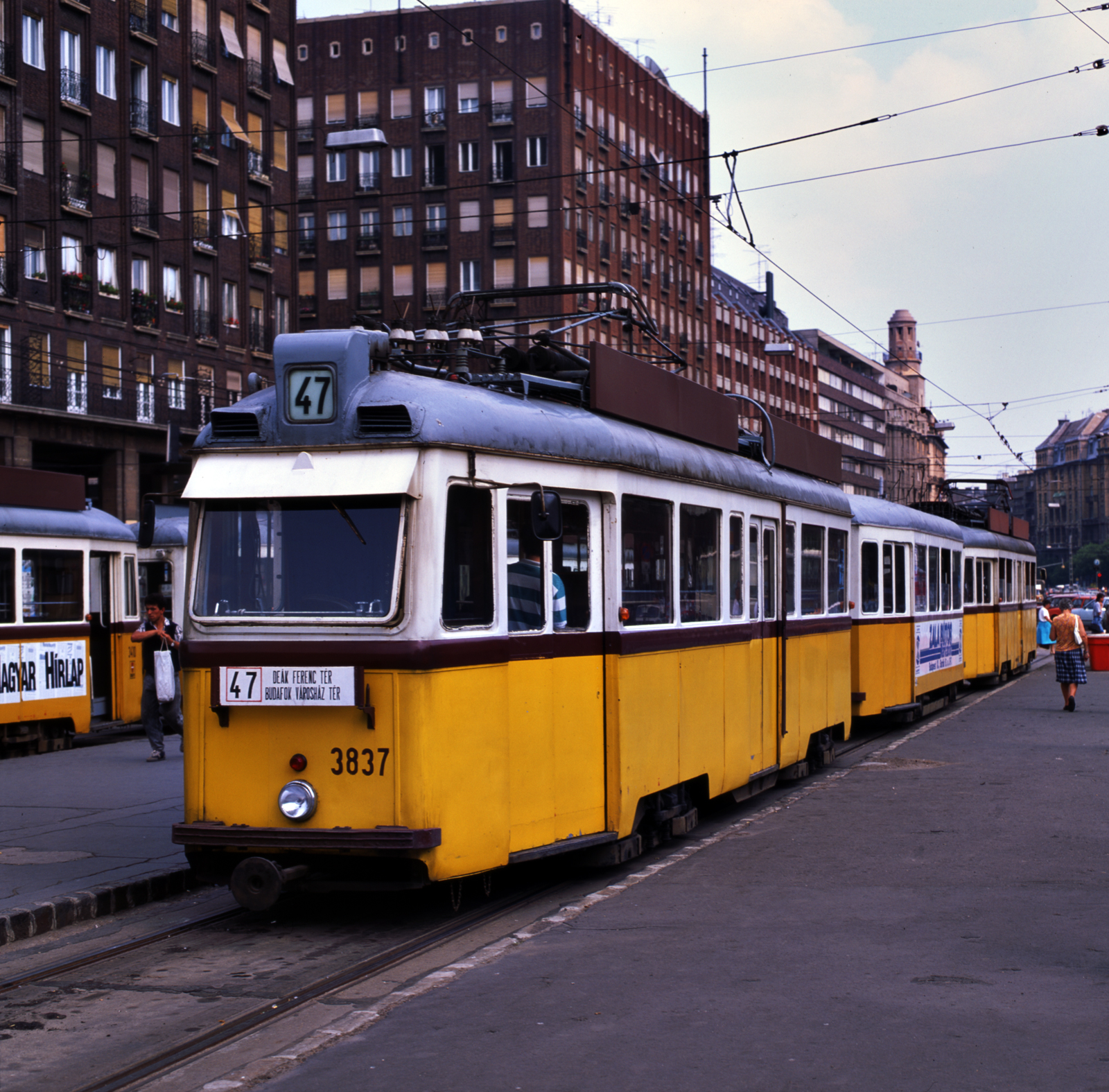
- An UV tramset on Budapest's line 47 in 1992
- In service: 1956–2007 (~51 years)
- Manufacturers: underframe and bogies: Ganz Vagon- és Gépgyár; Budapest, Hungary carbody: Rába Magyar Vagon- és Gépgyár, Győr, Hungary traction system: Klement Gottwald Villamossági Gyár; Budapest, Hungary
- Replaced: Ganz TM Stuka
- Constructed: UV1: 1956–1957; UV2: 1958–1959; UV3: 1959–1961; UV5: 1962–1965; UZ: 1958–1959
- Entered service: 1956 (70 years ago)
- Refurbished: 1993–1994 (20 UV into MUV)
- Scrapped: 1990s–2007 (19 years ago)
- Number built: UV1: 50; UV2: 100; UV3: 125; UV4: 0 UV5: 100; UZ: 2 total: 377
- Number in service: 0
- Number preserved: at least 11 cars (multiple variants)
- Number scrapped: n.a.
- Formation: MC, (Note: MC stands for motor coach) MC+TR, (Note: TR stands for trailer car) MC+TR+MC, MC+MC
- Fleet numbers: UV1: 3200–3249; UV2: 3250–3349; UV3: 3350–3474; UV5: 3800–3899
- Capacity: 94 passengers (Note: assuming 5 passengers/m²)
- Operators: Fővárosi Villamosvasút (FVV), Budapest, Hungary (1956–1967); Budapesti Közlekedési Vállalat (BKV), Budapest, Hungary (1968–2007)

Specifications
- Car body construction: UV1, UV2, UV3, UV5: steel, UZ: aluminium
- Car length: carbody: 12,600 mm (41 ft 4 in) between couplers: 13,500 mm (44 ft 3 in) (UV1, UV2, UV3); 13,690 mm (44 ft 11 in) (UV5)
- Width: 2,300 mm (7 ft 7 in)
- Height: 3,100 mm (10 ft 2 in)
- Floor height: 783 mm (2 ft 6.8 in) (midsection); 668 mm (2 ft 2.3 in) (end sections)
- Entry: step
- Doors: telescopic sliding doors, 3 per side UV1, UV2, UV3: 2+1+2; UV5: 2+2+2
- Wheel diameter: 670 mm (2 ft 2 in)
- Maximum speed: 50 km/h (31 mph)
- Weight: 19,750 kg (21.77 short tons)
- Traction system: 4 × Ganz TA 1.18 initially in early cars: 4 × Ganz TA 1.12
- Power output: 4 × 50 hp (37 kW) (=200 hp (150 kW)) initially in early cars: 4 × 42 hp (31 kW) (=168 hp (125 kW))
- Auxiliaries: 24 V DC
- Power supply: 600 V DC (except MUV cars)
- HVAC: electric heating
- Electric system: 600 V DC from overhead line
- Current collection: pantograph
- UIC classification: Bo'Bo'tr (Note: the UIC axle arrangement classification appendix "tr" officially denotes a tram vehicle)
- Bogies: pivoting
- Braking systems: electric, electro-pneumatic
- Safety system: proprietary tramset breakage sensing system
- Coupling system: mechanical: Alemann-type trichterkupplung electrical: proprietary DC connectors
- Multiple working: only with same type
- Headlight type: incandescent light bulbs
- Track gauge: 1,435 mm (4 ft 8 1/2 in)

The Ganz UV (Hungarian pronunciation: [ˈɡɒnz ˈuːveː]) is a series of tramcars which was manufactured by Hungarian companies Ganz Vagon- és Gépgyár ("Ganz Carriage and Machine Factory"), Rába Magyar Vagon- és Gépgyár ("Rába Hungarian Carriage and Machine Factory") and Klement Gottwald Villamossági Gyár ("Klement Gottwald Electric Factory"), which was the name of Ganz Villamossági Gyár ("Ganz Electric Factory") at the time of manufacturing. The UV tramcars have four main variants, all are four axle rail motor coaches with a Bo'Bo'tr axle arrangement, capable of operating as electric multiple units. The cars were manufactured between 1956 and 1965 in Budapest, and overall 375 regular units and 2 prototypes were made.

The UV type designation resolves to U típusú távvezérelt motorkocsi ("type U remotely controlled motor coach"). The units are capable of controlling another unit of their type through proprietary 50-wire cables. The trams are also capable of sensing the breakup of the tramset with the use of a chain hanging between the cars; brakes are automatically applied if a chain is pulled out from its sockets. Two prototypes were made with aluminium carbodies, designated as UZ, (Note: UZ: [ˈuːzeː]) these proved to be unsuccessful. In addition, in the 1990s, 20 UV cars were refurbished and they are referred to as MUV (Note: MUV: [ˈɛmuːveː]) (modernizált UV, "modernized UV"). Planned to replace the pre-WWII design TM (Note: TM: [ˈteːɛm]) trams, with 377 units, the UV series became the most numerous type of tramcar produced in Hungary.

The first car entered passenger service in 1956, and the type was ultimately decommissioned in 2007, after roughly 51 years of continuous service. UV trams became one of the symbols of Budapest, and had appeared in a number of Hungarian and foreign movies as plot elements. Two preserved, paired UV cars now annually serve as the city's so-called Christmas light trams in the festive season, decorated with white and blue LED lights.

== Design and manufacturing ==
The UV series was designed with the aid of the Hungarian Academy of Sciences, and was specifically intended to improve on and address the flaws of the then-current TM Stuka tramcars which debuted in 1939. In 1948, Ganz showcased a prototype tram set on the Budapest International Fair (BNV), made up from three modified TM cars damaged in the war. The modified TMs at the ends were referred to as TV, resolving to T típusú távvezérelt motorkocsi ("type T remotely controlled motor coach"), the most significant alteration being that they were capable of operating as multiple units with each other with or without the third TM car acting as a plain trailer car in between. This prototype tram was nicknamed Szellem ("Ghost"). While the TV didn't reached mass production, it served as a basis for the UV design.

Eventually four main variants of UV tramcars were produced, with the UV4 variant reaching only the planning stage. These variants are shown in the following table.

Variant	Prod. years	Prod. numbers	Fleet numbers	Notes
UV1	1956–1957	50	3200–3249	
UV2	1958–1959	100	3250–3349	
UV3	1959–1961	125	3350–3474	
UV4	–	0 (only planned)	–	would have had longer body than the other variants
UV5	1962–1965	100	3800–3899	middle doors are two-passenger wide instead of one

There were no designs for a new trailer car for the UV series, and in practice, Budapest's tram operator (FVV, and its successor, BKV) used earlier EP and FP trailers. These were modified to support the UV control and power connections and to fit the UV aesthetics more closely.

=== Prototypes and refurbishments ===
A prototype design was also manufactured with the designation UZ, with a lighter carbody made from aluminium. Only two tramcars were made in 1958 and 1959 since the design proved to be expensive to produce and fragile. The two cars however saw a few years of passenger service. Another prototype was made in 1962 from a pair of UV1 and UV2 tramcars damaged in a collision, these were joined to form an articulated vehicle (referred to as the iker-UV, "twin UV"), but the results were deemed unsuccessful, and the cars were separated and rebuilt as regular single cars.

Between 1993 and 1994, 20 of the UV3 tramcars were refurbished, and were designated as MUV (modernizált UV, "modernized UV"). A significant change were the elimination of the power couplings between cars, as a consequence, car sets having MUV cars had to operate with all their pantographs in an active position.

UV-related prototypes, refurbishments and other related vehicles are shown in the following table.

Vehicle	Type	Prod. years	Prod. num.	Fleet num.	Notes
TV (Szellem, "Ghost")	motor coach, prototype	1948	2	3700, 3701	made from damaged TM cars
UZ	motor coach, prototype	1958–1959	2	n.a.	with aluminium body
iker-UV ("twin UV")	artic. motor coach, prototype	n.a.	1	n.a.	made from two damaged UV cars, later separated
MUV (modernizált UV, "modernized UV")	motor coach	1993–1994	20	n.a.	refurbished UV cars
UV oktatókocsi ("UV trainer car")	motor coach, training	n.a.	n.a.	n.a.	were used as training cars for tram drivers, have added fault simulation circuitry and slanted red striping on top of the livery
EP	trailer car	n.a.	n.a.	n.a.	modified to fit the UV series
FP	trailer car	n.a.	n.a.	n.a.	modified to fit the UV series

== See also ==
- Ganz TM
- FVV CSM
- Ganz CSMG
- Trams in Budapest
- Ganz Works
- Rába (company)
