= Ganz CSMG =

Ganz CSMG (GCSM, ICS)
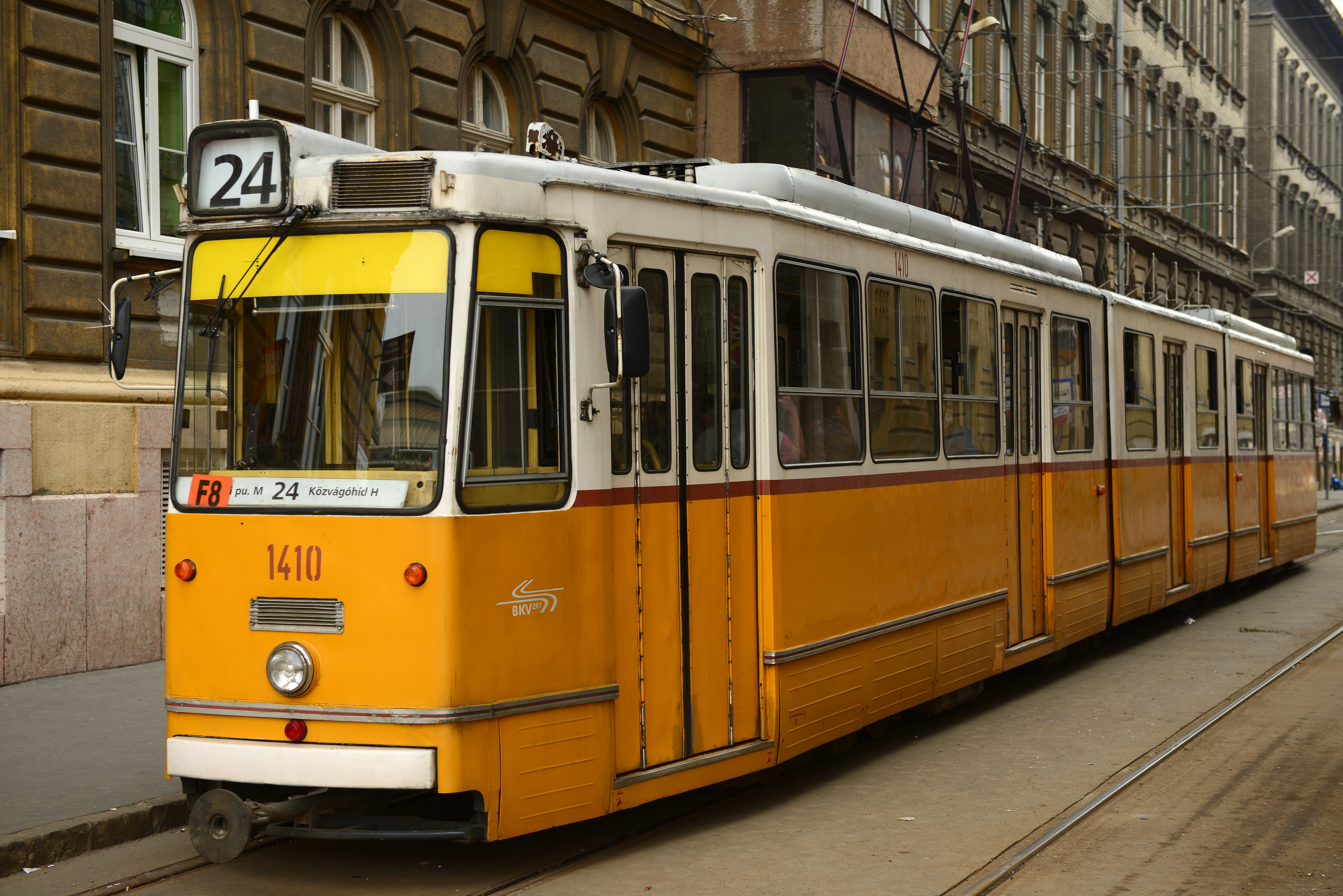
- CSMG-2 motor coach no. 1410 on Budapest's line 24 in 2014

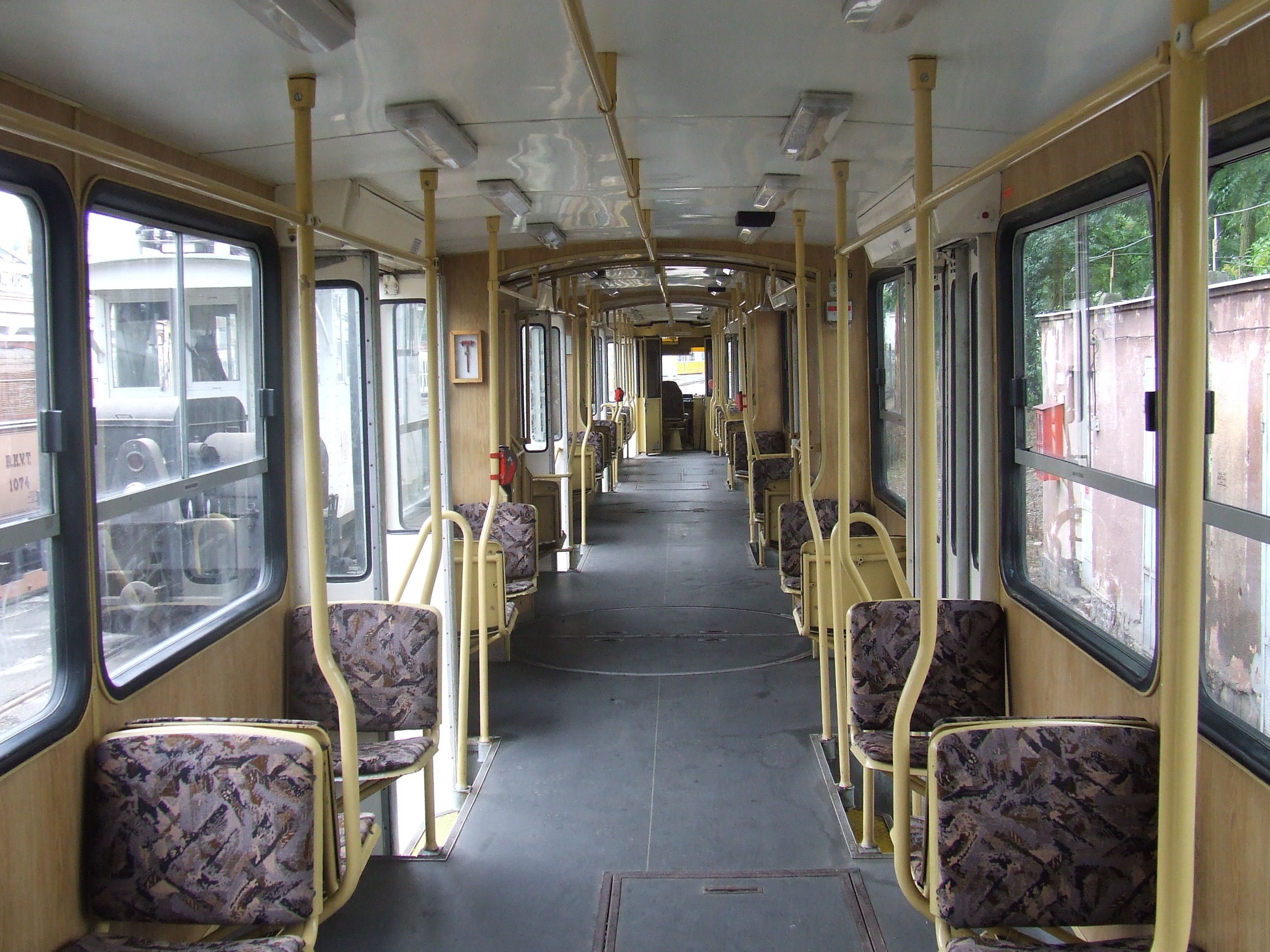
- Interior of a CSMG motor coach in 2011
- In service: 1965–present (60–61 years)
- Manufacturers: underframe, bogies and carbody: Ganz-MÁVAG Mozdony-, Vagon- és Gépgyár; Budapest, Hungary traction system: Ganz Villamossági Gyár; Budapest, Hungary
- Replaced: FVV CSM Bengáli, Ganz UV
- Constructed: CSMG-0: 1964–1965; CSMG-1: 1967–1970; CSMG-2: 1970–1976; CSMG-3: 1977–1978
- Entered service: 1965 (61 years ago)
- Refurbished: 1970–1975, 1991–1994 (1 CSMG into KCSV-5), 1996–1999 (20 CSMG into KCSV-7)
- Scrapped: 2009
- Number built: CSMG-0: 2 CSMG-1: 35; CSMG-2: 87; CSMG-3: 30 total: 154
- Number preserved: at least 1 (KCSV-5)
- Number scrapped: at least 2 (CSMG prototypes)
- Formation: MC, (Note: MC stands for motor coach) MC+MC
- Fleet numbers: CSMG-0: 3730, 3731; CSMG-1: 1301–1335; CSMG-2: 1336–1390, 1420–1451 (1371–1390→1400–1419); CSMG-3: 1452–1481
- Capacity: CSMG cars: 201 passengers, (Note: assuming 5 passengers/m²); 30 seats (13xx cars); 196 passengers, 38 seats (14xx cars); KCSV-5: 201 passengers, 30 seats KCSV-7: 192 passengers, 36 seats
- Operators: Fővárosi Villamosvasút (FVV), Budapest, Hungary (1965–1967); Budapesti Közlekedési Vállalat (BKV), Budapest, Hungary (1968–present)

Specifications
- Car body construction: Steel
- Car length: carbody: 26,000 mm (85 ft 4 in) between couplers: 26,900 mm (88 ft 3 in)
- Width: 2,300 mm (7 ft 7 in)
- Height: CSMG cars: 3,100 mm (10 ft 2 in); KCSV cars: 3,500 mm (11 ft 6 in)
- Floor height: 850 mm (2 ft 9 in)
- Entry: step
- Doors: folding doors, 5 per side, 2+2+2+2+2; CSMG-0 prototypes until 1974: folding doors, 4 per side, 2+2+2+2
- Articulated sections: two CSMG-0 prototypes until 1974: one
- Wheel diameter: 670 mm (2 ft 2 in)
- Wheelbase: 1,800 mm (5 ft 11 in)
- Maximum speed: 50 km/h (31 mph)
- Weight: CSMG cars: 33,600 kg (37.0 short tons); KCSV cars: 34,000 kg (37 short tons)
- Traction system: 4 × Ganz TK 44
- Power output: CSMG cars: 4 × 66 hp (49 kW) (=264 hp (197 kW)); KCSV cars: 4 × 61 hp (46 kW) (=244 hp (182 kW))
- Auxiliaries: 24 V DC
- Power supply: 24 V DC
- HVAC: electric heating (originally only on CSMG-1)
- Electric system: 600 V DC from overhead line
- Current collection: pantograph
- UIC classification: Bo'2'2'Bo'tr (Note: the UIC axle arrangement classification appendix "tr" officially denotes a tram vehicle); CSMG-0 prototypes until 1974: Bo'2'Bo'tr
- Bogies: pivoting
- Braking system: electric
- Safety system: proprietary tramset breakage sensing system
- Coupling system: mechanical: Alemann-type trichterkupplung electrical: proprietary DC connectors
- Multiple working: only with same type
- Headlight type: incandescent light bulbs
- Track gauge: 1,435 mm (4 ft 8 1/2 in)

The Ganz CSMG (Hungarian: [ˈɡɒnz ˈt͡ʃeːɛmɡeː]), known in official FVV/BKV records as GCSM, (Note: GCSM: [ˈɡeːt͡ʃeːɛm]) or sometimes known as ICS, (Note: ICS: [ˈiːt͡ʃeː]) is a series of tramcars which was manufactured by Hungarian companies Ganz-MÁVAG Mozdony-, Vagon- és Gépgyár ("Ganz-MÁVAG Locomotive, Carriage and Machine Factory") and Ganz Villamossági Gyár ("Ganz Electric Factory"). The CSMG tramcars have three main variants, which are all eight axle rail motor coaches with a Bo'2'2'Bo'tr axle arrangement, the last variant being capable of operating as electric multiple units. The cars were manufactured in Budapest between 1964 and 1978, and in overall 152 regular units and two prototypes were made.

The official CSMG designation resolves to Csuklós Motorkocsi, Ganz ("Articulated Motor Coach, Ganz"), this was changed to GCSM in FVV and BKV records, and the semi-official ICS resolves to Ipari Csuklós ("Industrial Articulated"), because it was the first articulated tram design in Hungary which was produced by a regular manufacturing company instead of an in-house workshop of a transit company. The final production variant of the series is capable of controlling another unit of its type through proprietary 50-wire cables, though traction current isn't shared between units. The trams are also capable of sensing the breakup of the tramset with a proprietary system implemented along the couplers. Two prototypes, sometimes referred to as CSMG-0, were made before mass production started; these cars originally had a single articulated joint instead of two, but later these were extended. The production variants CSMG-1, CSMG-2 and CSMG-3 were unified over the years, and now they are referred to as CSMG-E. One damaged car was rebuilt with experimental features, and its type is referred to as KCSV-5. (Note: KCSV: [ˈkaːt͡ʃeːveː]) Partly based on the operating experiences of this car, in the 1990s, 20 CSMG cars were refurbished, their type is referred to as KCSV-7. The CSMG was intended to replace the lower capacity Ganz UV (Note: UV: [ˈuːveː]) and obsolete, in-house FVV CSM (Note: FVV CSM: [ˈɛfveːveː ˈt͡ʃeːɛm]) Bengáli trams.

CSMG tramcars are still in active service in Budapest, whereas—with the exception of the two prototypes—the first scrapping took place only in 2009, when the only KCSV-5 car was taken out of service owing to maintenance difficulties. The first tramcar entered passenger service in 1965; thus, the series is now in continuous service for 60–61 years. The series also carries the distinction of having one of the cars take Diana, Princess of Wales on a ride along the city's scenic Line 2 on the Danube's bank. CSMG tramcars are nicknamed as ICS or ipari csuklós ("industrial articulated"), Ganz csuklós ("Ganz articulated"), or when running in multiple unit pairs, Góliát ("Goliath").

== Design and manufacturing ==
The CSMG series was Ganz's, and thus the Hungarian machine industry's first foray into articulated rail vehicle production, as the obsolete CSM Bengáli tramcars made by FVV's in-house Árpád Füzesi Workshop and Ganz's own lower capacity UV series proved to be inadequate for the growing demands of Budapest's tram network. Thus, two CSMG prototypes, sometimes referred to as CSMG-0, were manufactured between 1964 and 1965. These had only one articulation, but were expanded with another body section later to resemble the production variants, as they were in passenger service for some years. After the first CSMG production run, however, features were scaled back; this resulted in tramcars having less comfort, but after years of repairs and refurbishments, almost all CSMG cars converged on a general set of specifications referred to as CSMG-E (Csuklós Motorkocsi, Ganz – Egységesített, "Articulated Motor Coach, Ganz – Unified").

Eventually 3 main variants of CSMG tramcars were produced; these variants are shown in the following table.

Variant	Production years	Production numbers	Fleet numbers
CSMG-1 (CsMG.1)	1967–1970	35	1301–1335
CSMG-2 (CsMG.2)	1970–1976	87	1336–1390, 1420–1451 (1371–1390→1400–1419)
CSMG-3 (CsMG.3)	1977–1978	30	1452–1481

Between 1991 and 1994, a CSMG car damaged in the 1980s was rebuilt and modernized by Ganz and got the designation KCSV-5 (Korszerűsített Csuklós Villamos, 5-ös típus, "Modernized Articulated Tram, type 5"). Based on the experiences with this car, 30 CSMG cars were refurbished between 1996 and 1999; these were designated as KCSV-7 (Korszerűsített Csuklós Villamos, 7-es típus, "Modernized Articulated Tram, type 7"). These shouldn't be confused with Ganz's last articulated tram type, the similarly designated KCSV-6.

CSMG-related prototypes, refurbishments, and other related vehicles are shown in the following table.

Vehicle	Type	Production years	Production numbers	Fleet numbers	Notes
CSMG prototype (CSMG-0)	articulated motor coach, prototype	1964–1965	2	3730, 3731	
CSMG-E (Csuklós Motorkocsi, Ganz – Egységesített, "Articulated Motor Coach, Ganz – Unified")	articulated motor coach	n.a.			refurbished CSMG cars
KCSV-5 (Korszerűsített Csuklós Villamos, 5-ös típus, "Modernized Articulated Tram, type 5")	articulated motor coach, prototype	1991–1994	1	1303	rebuilt from a damaged CSMG car
KCSV-7 (Korszerűsített Csuklós Villamos, 7-es típus, "Modernized Articulated Tram, type 7")	articulated motor coach	1996–1999	30	1321, 1325-32, 1335-37, 1339, 1340, 1343-48, 1350-56, 1359, 1362, 1370	refurbished CSMG cars
CSMG oktatókocsi ("CSMG trainer car")	articulated motor coach	n.a.			used as training cars for tram drivers, have slanted red striping on top of the livery

== See also ==
- FVV CSM
- Ganz UV
- Ganz KCSV-6
- Ganz MFAV
- Trams in Budapest
- Ganz Works
- Articulated vehicle
