= Ultraviolet (disambiguation) =

Ultraviolet refers to electromagnetic radiation with a wavelength shorter than that of visible light, but longer than soft X-rays.

Ultraviolet, UltraViolet, or Ultra Violet may also refer to:

== Film and television ==
- Ultraviolet (TV serial), a 1998 British television miniseries
- Ultraviolet (film), a 2006 science fiction film
  - Ultraviolet (novel), a 2006 novel adapted from the film
  - Ultraviolet: Code 044, a 2008 Japanese anime based on the film
- Ultraviolet (2017 TV series), a Polish television series
- Ultraviolet (Arrowverse), Esperanza Garcia, a character from the TV series The Flash
- Ultra Violet, Violet Rodriguez, the titular heroine from the 2022 TV series Ultra Violet & Black Scorpion

== Music ==
=== Album ===
- Ultraviolet (All About Eve album), 1992
- Ultraviolet (EP), a 2014 EP by Owl City
- Ultraviolet (Kelly Moran album), 2018
- Ultraviolet (Kid Sister album), 2009
- Ultraviolet (Kirsten Morrell album), 2010
- Ultraviolet (Kylesa album), 2013
- Ultraviolet (Misery Signals album), 2020
- Ultraviolet (Poets of the Fall album), 2018
- Ultraviolet (Pseudo Echo album), 2014, or the title track
- Ultraviolet (Sadistik album), 2014
- Ultra Violet (Bananarama album), 1995
- Ultraviolet, a 1994 album by Ed Alleyne-Johnson, or the title track
- Houseworks Presents Ultraviolet, a 2002 album by DJ Antoine; see DJ Antoine discography

=== Song ===
- "Ultraviolet"/"The Ballad of Paul K", a 2005 single by McFly
- "Ultraviolet (Light My Way)", a 1991 song by U2
- "Ultraviolet" (Fred V & Grafix song), 2016
- "Ultraviolet", a 1978 song by Romano Musumarra and Claudio Gizzi from Automat
- "Ultraviolet", a 2001 song by Annetenna from Annetenna
- "Ultraviolet", a 2003 song by Karl Bartos from Communication
- "Ultraviolet", a 2006 song by Joanna Pacitti from This Crazy Life
- "Ultraviolet", a 2008 song by the B-52's from Funplex
- "Ultraviolet", a 2008 cover of the Pacitti song by Stiff Dylans for the film Angus, Thongs and Perfect Snogging
- "Ultraviolet", a 2010 song by Miami Horror from Illumination
- "Ultraviolet", a 2013 song by FKA twigs from EP2
- "Ultraviolet", a 2013 song by Erra from Augment
- "Ultraviolet", a 2019 song by Fallujah from Undying Light
- "Ultraviolet", a 2023 song by Spiritbox from The Fear of Fear

== Other uses ==
- Ultra Violet (Ninjago), a character in Ninjago
- Ultra Violet (Isabelle Collin Dufresne), French-American artist and author
- UltraViolet (organization), a women's advocacy group in the United States
- UltraViolet (website), a digital rights authentication and cloud-based licensing system

== See also ==
- UV (disambiguation)
- Violet (disambiguation)
