= Ikarus 415 =

Hungarian Low-floor city bus

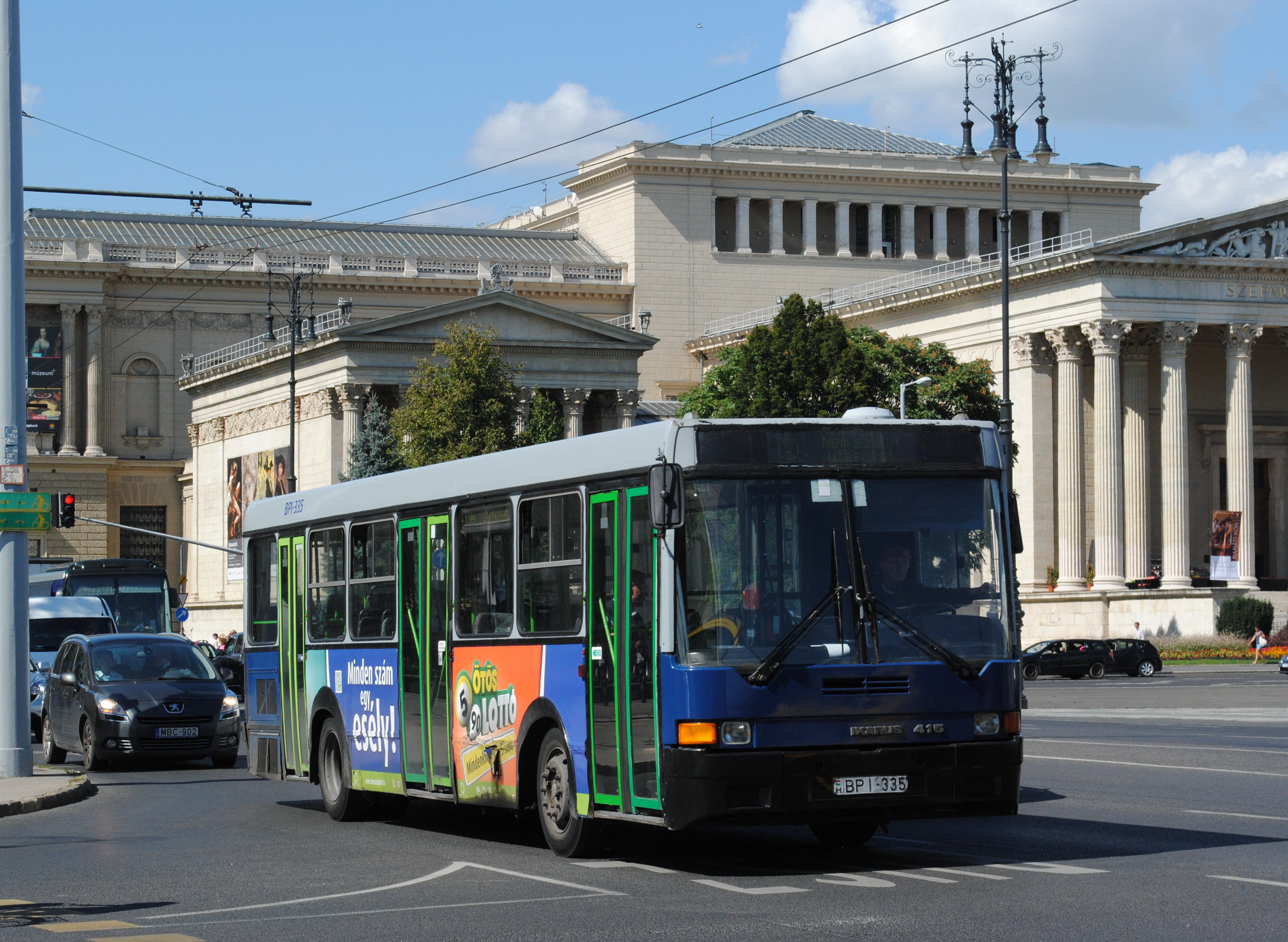
- A Ikarus 415 in Budapest, Hungary

Overview
- Type: Urban Bus
- Manufacturer: Ikarus Bus
- Model years: 1987-2002

Body and chassis
- Body style: Single-decker City bus
- Doors: 3 doors
- Floor type: High-floor

Powertrain
- Engine: MAN D 0826 LUH 12 six-cylinder diesel engine

Chronology
- Predecessor: Ikarus 260
- Successor: None (Ikarus went bankrupt in 2003)

The Ikarus 415 is a type of high-floor city bus produced by the Hungarian company Ikarus Bus in Hungary. The prototype of the Ikarus 415 was manufactured in 1985, with serial production starting in 1987. The buses used a MAN D 0826 LUH 12 six-cylinder diesel engine and a ZF Ecomat automatic four-speed transmission.

== Gallery ==
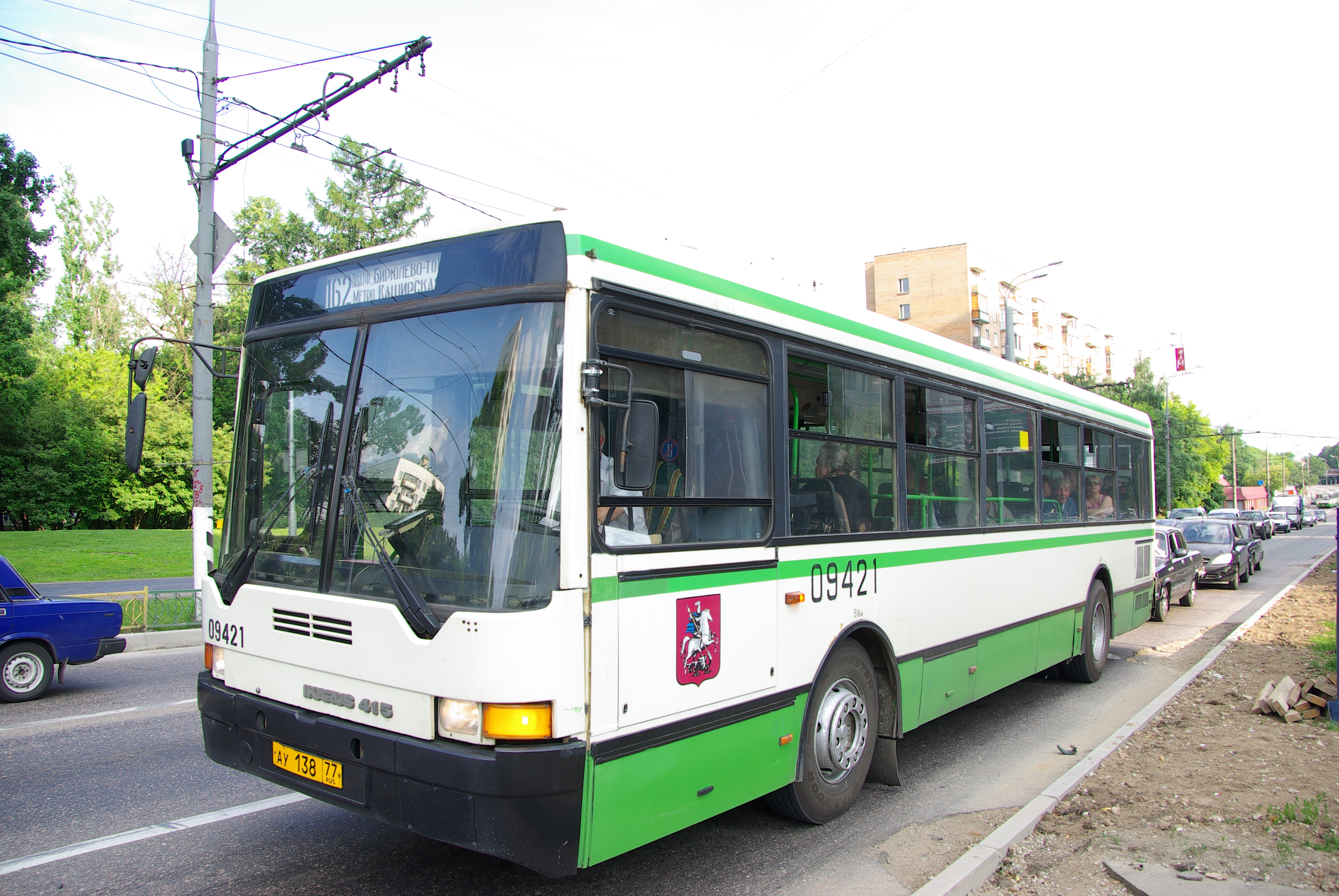
An Ikarus 415 in Moscow, Russia

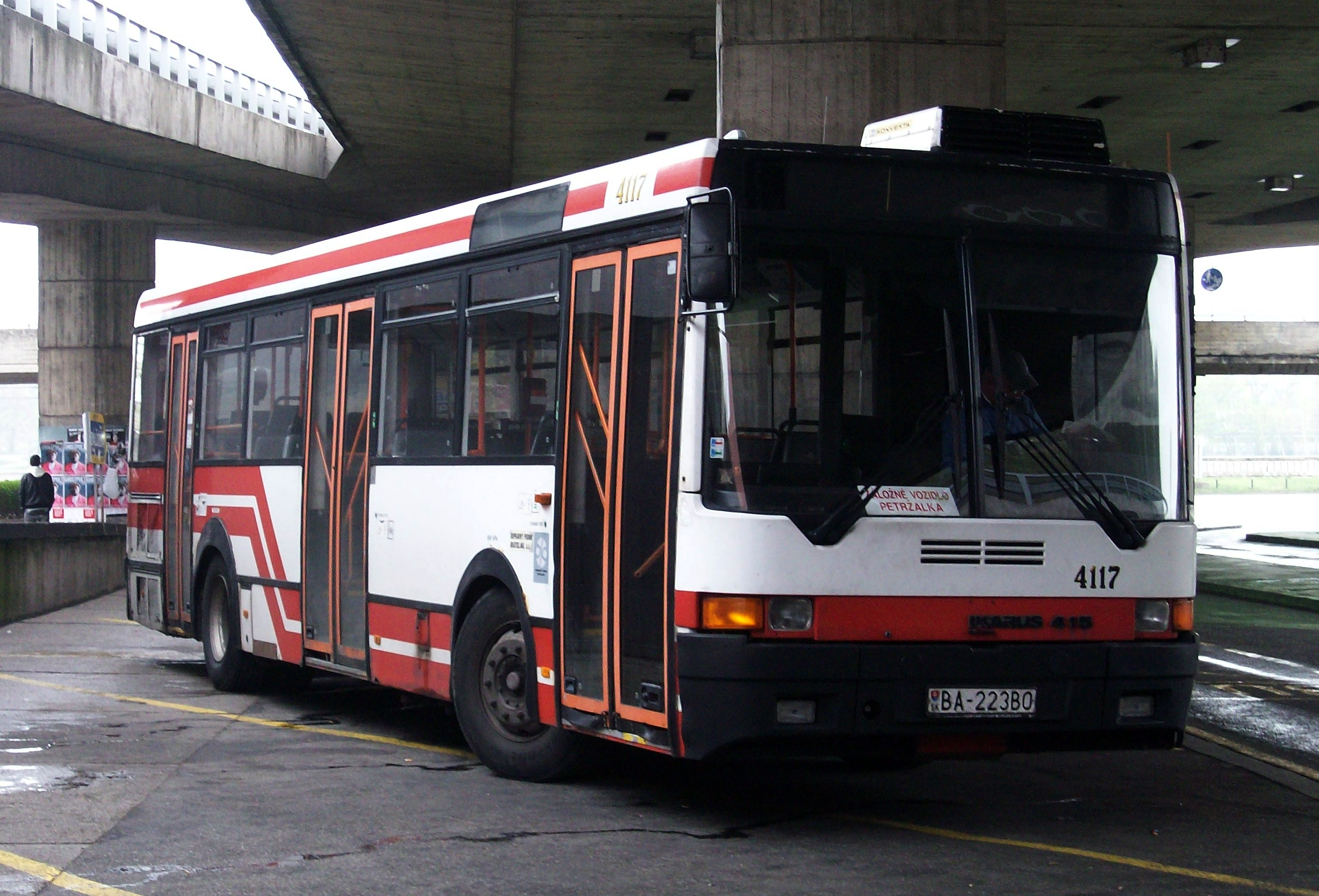
Ikarus 415 in Bratislava, Slovakia

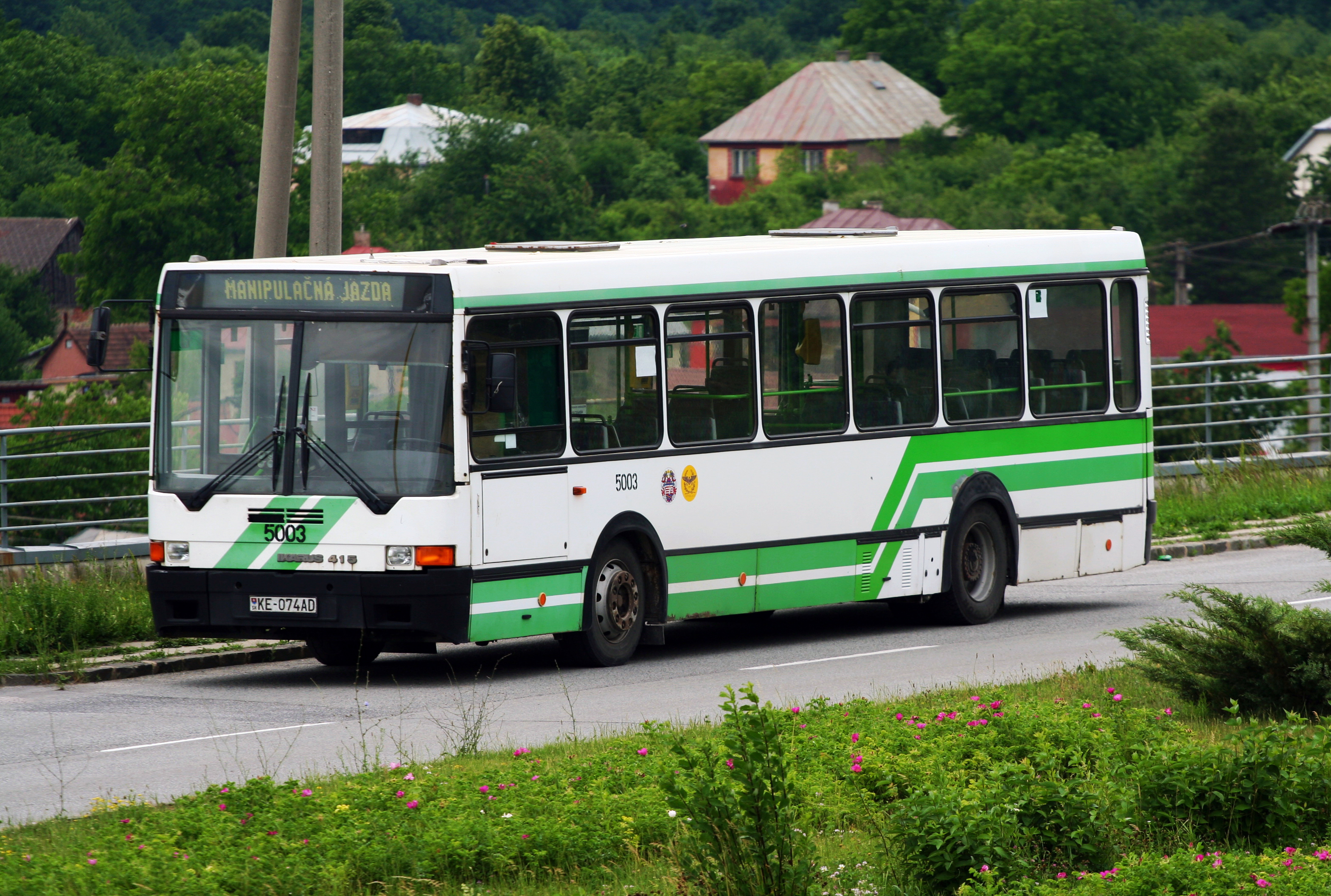
Ikarus 415 in Košice, Slovakia

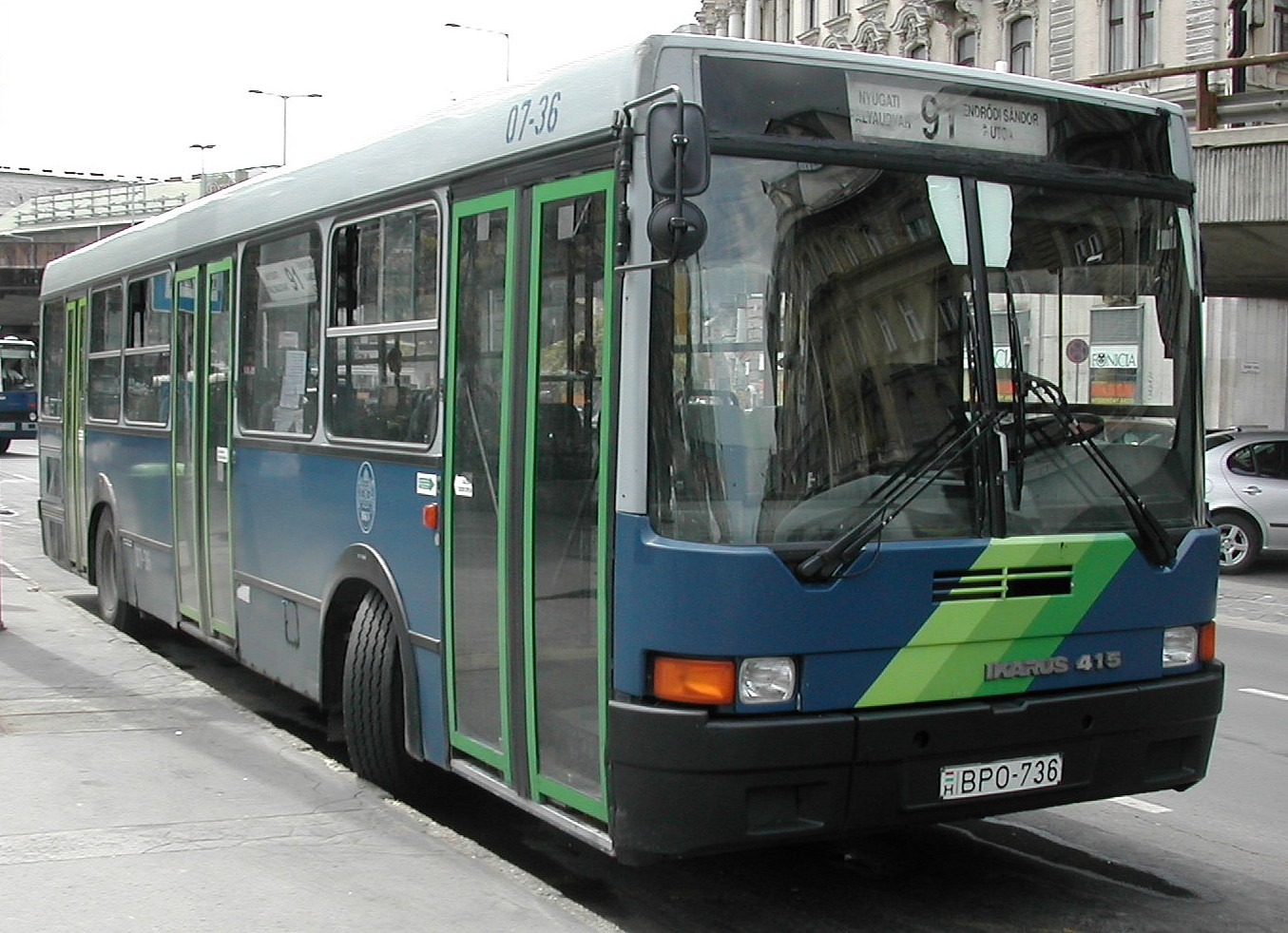
An Ikarus 415 in Budapest, Hungary

== Sources ==
- Martin, Harák (2022-11-29). Autobusy Ikarus [Ikarus buses] (in Czech). Grada Publishing a.s. ISBN 978-80-271-6713-5.
