= UV Televisión =

Television station in Ecuador

- Loja; Ecuador
- Channels: Analog: 4 (VHF)

History
- First air date: 18 November 1968

UV Televisión is an Ecuadorian television station based in Loja, capital of the eponymous province. The station is an independent operation, on channel 4, and is operated by local interests. One of the two local television stations there (the other being Ecotel on channel 22), it covers Loja, Zamora-Chinchipe and border areas in northern Peru.

== History ==
UV Televisión was founded as Canal 4 on 18 November 1968. It was owned by Telecuador, a company which was already setting up the first television stations outside of Quito and Guayaquil. Programs arrived on 16mm film packages dispatched from Guayaquil to inland stations, among them, the one in Loja. However, economic losses led to the closure of the st ation on November 18, 1978.

The station's revival started in 1985 by Walter Jaramillo, who acquired the license formerly held by Telecuador in June 1988 and started conducting test broadcasts on the same frequency on 24 December 1989. By 1993, the station was renamed Univisión, broadcasting two to three hours of programming a day and started providing a regular service, which included its first news bulletins; however, on November 16 of that year, Jaramillo died from a traffic accident. In 1994, the station started covering the whole province, as well as the adjacent province of Zamora-Chinchipe, as well as spillover into northern Peru. With this expansion, Univisión was renamed UV Televisión.

In 1996, it finished building its new headquarters, divided into two buildings: Building 1 for production and broadcasting and Building 2 for the station's administrative and social areas. In 1997, it joined Asociación de Canales de Televisión Ecuadorianos (ACTVE), followed in 1998 by Asociación Iberoamericana de Canales de Televisión. A microwave link was set up in 1999 for the station to cover events across the city, then in 2000 it started acquiring digital equipments; a feat it achieved in 2002 for its playout.

== Programming ==
UVTV was established as a "private station with a public television mission". Until 1999, the station was known for its support of environmental causes and sustainable development in southern Ecuador. Based on its beliefs, it achieved the nickname La Televisión Útil (Useful TV).

In line with the digitization of its equipment in 2002, it coproduced a 13-episode international series, Los Caballos. In successive years, it signed agreements with international channels, such as the Venezuelan-backed news channel Telesur (of which Ecuador used to be a member) for the joint documentary Loja, ciudades hermanas.
