= Ikarus 260 =

High-floor bus/coach manufactured by Ikarus

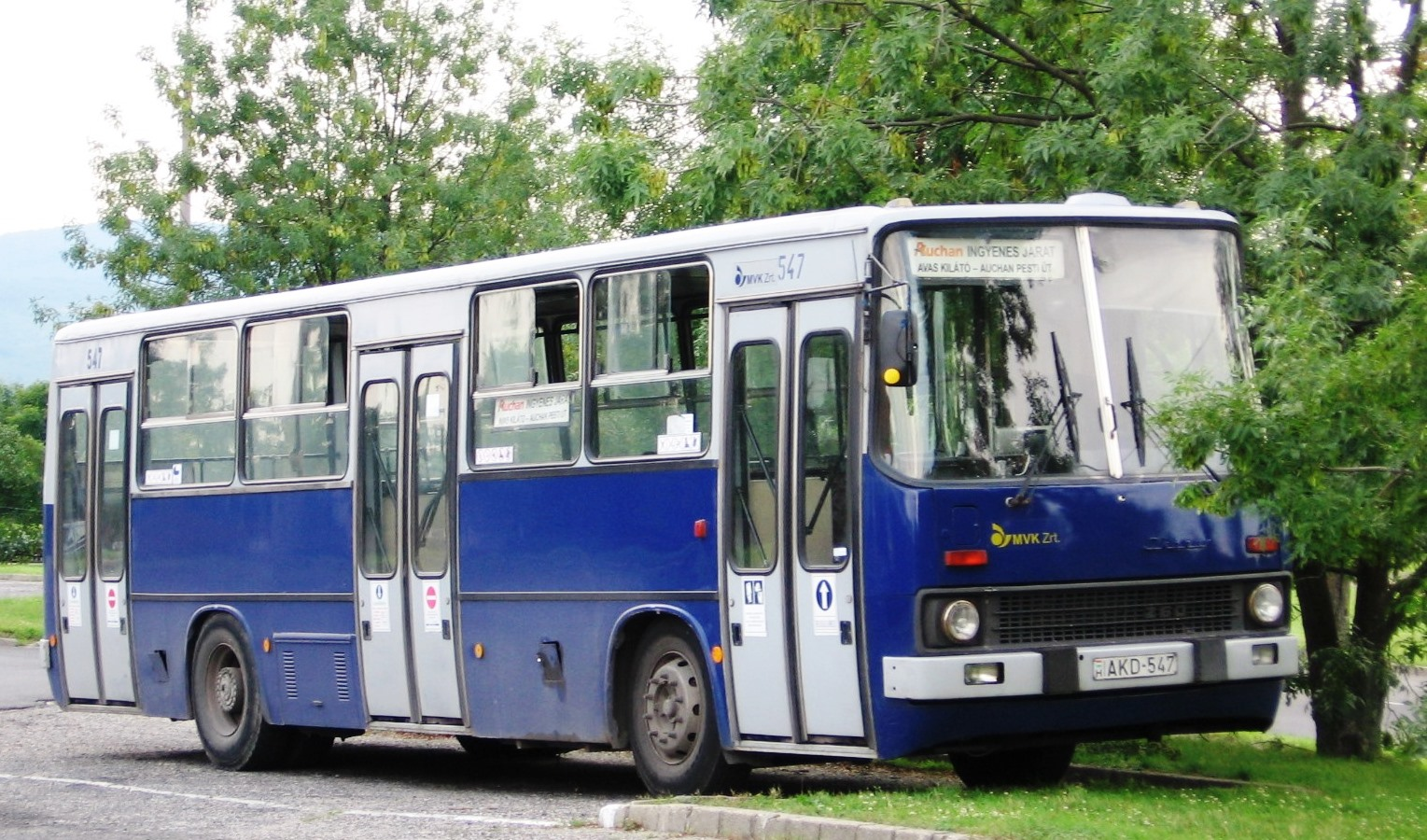
- An Ikarus 260 in Miskolc, 2014

Overview
- Manufacturer: Ikarus

Body and chassis
- Doors: Three; Two (some suburban sub-models)
- Floor type: High-floor
- Chassis: Semi-self-supporting
- Related: Ikarus 280

Powertrain
- Engine: RÁBA D 2156 HM6U inline-six diesel engine (with or without turbocharger); RÁBA D10 UTS 150 turbocharged inline-six diesel engine
- Capacity: 21 sitting, 76 standing (city basemodel, other models may have altering configurations)
- Power output: 141 kW (189 hp) (D 2156, no turbocharger); 162 kW (217 hp) (D 2156, turbocharged); 150 kW (200 hp) (D10)
- Transmission: PRAGA 2 M70.16 two-speed automatic gearbox VOITH-DIWA D851.2 three-speed automatic gearbox ZF 4HP 500 four-speed automatic gearbox 5/6 Speed manual

Dimensions
- Wheelbase: 5,400 mm (212 5/8 in)
- Length: 11,000 mm (433 1/8 in)
- Width: 2,500 mm (98 3/8 in)
- Height: 3,100 mm (122 in)
- Kerb weight: 9,000 kg (20,000 lb)

Chronology
- Predecessor: Ikarus 556
- Successor: Ikarus 415

The Ikarus 260 is a high-floor, three-door bus for city and suburban transportation purposes. It was made from 1971 to 2002 by the Hungarian bus manufacturer Ikarus, making it the longest manufactured, largest quantity model of the factory.

== History ==
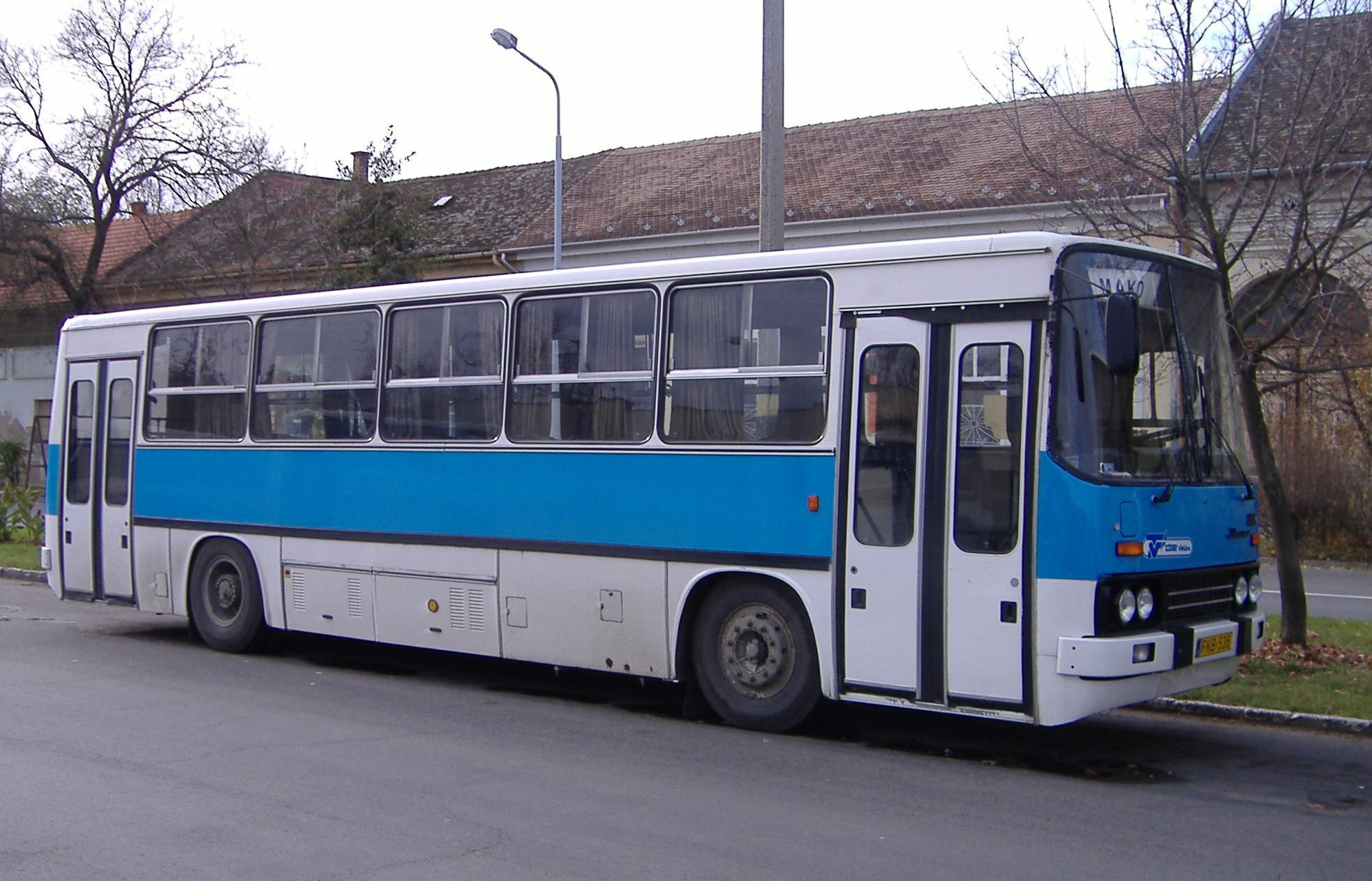
Two-door suburban sub-model in Makó built in 1988

The model featured a high-floor body, with the engine mounted under the floor in order to spare space and achieve better weight distribution. Design work began in 1966, with the main designer being László Finta, the designer of the predecessing Ikarus 556 and 180 models. The first three prototypes left the Mátyásföld plant in 1970, with serial production starting in 1972.

With Hungary being the leading bus manufacturer in the Comecon area, the demand for the new model grew quickly. Outside Hungary, the largest importers were the Soviet Union and the GDR, but the model drew so much attention that it reached outside the Iron Curtain, with vehicles being exported as far away as Iceland and Taiwan.

In Hungary, the model was very successful. Every bus company used the 260s to cover their routes from city to suburban, and even sometimes interurban traffic. During its peak in the 1980s, Ikarus 260, along with its articulated urban counterpart, the Ikarus 280, and its interurban variants, the Ikarus 250 and Ikarus 266 were almost exclusively the busses of choice for transport companies across the country.

The factory, overgrowing with confidence in the model's success, turned little attention towards developing the successor of the increasingly obsolete 260s, the Ikarus 415. Instead, Ikarus invested in a huge re-manufacturing effort in the late 80s to replace the aged out fleet of their Hungarian and Soviet partners, with only minor optical differences applied compared to the original buses dating to the early seventies. While the plan worked short-term, the lack of modernization later came with grave consequences.

The last ever Ikarus 260 left the Székesfehérvár plant in 2002, and became a part of the Szeged local transport system.

== Ikarus C60 ==
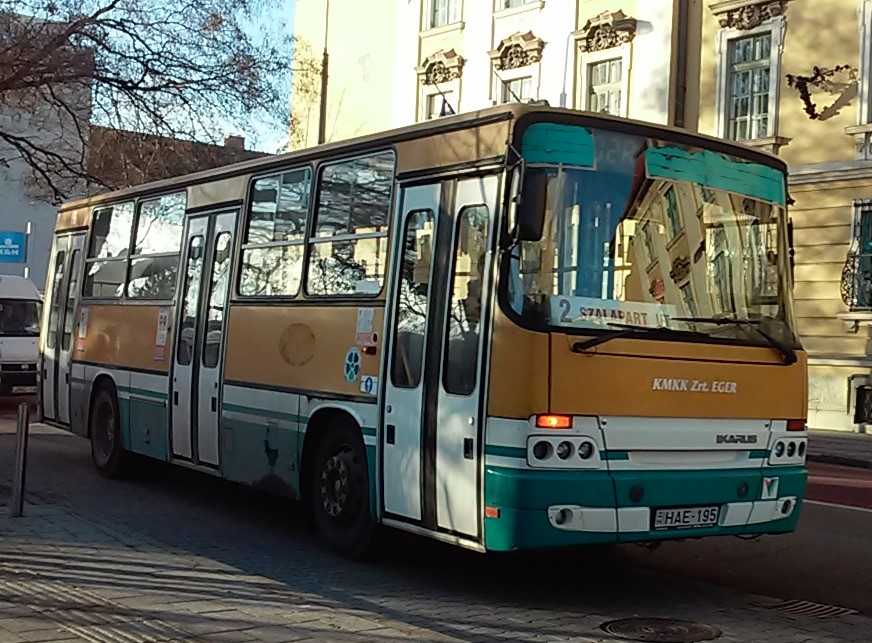
The only C60 ever built, number plate HAE-195, while still in service in Eger

In the 1990s, the factory experimented with a modernized facelift version of the 200 series, culminating in the Ikarus Classic series, where the 2 was replaced with a C in the model code (i. e. Ikarus 280 -> Ikarus C80). While the C56, and in a lesser extent the C80 proved popular with the suburban and interurban companies of Hungary, C60 failed to draw attention as it was too obsolete for the Hungarian and international urban market. In the end, Ikarus sold only one C60 ever, which served the Eger local bus network until 2021, and is currently awaiting renovation.

== Bibliography ==
- Gerlei Tamás, Kukla László, dr. Lovász György: Az Ikarus évszázados története. Budapest: Maróti Könyvkereskedés és Könyvkiadó Kft. 2008. ISBN 9789639005853
