= List of bridges in Hungary =

This list of bridges in Hungary lists bridges of particular historical, scenic, architectural or engineering interest. Road and railway bridges, viaducts, aqueducts and footbridges are included.

== Major road and railway bridges ==
This table presents the structures with spans greater than 100 meters (non-exhaustive list).

	Name	Hungarian	Span	Length	Type	Carries Crosses	Opened	Location	Region	Ref.
1	Pentele Bridge	Dunaújvárosi híd	308 m (1,010 ft)	1,670 m (5,480 ft)	Arch; Steel tied arch Bow-string bridge	M8 motorway European route E66; 4 lanes Danube	2007	Dunaújváros–Dunavecse; 46°54′12.0″N 18°57′29.7″E	Central Transdanubia; Southern Great Plain	
2	Megyeri Bridge	Megyeri híd	300 m (980 ft)	1,862 m (6,109 ft)	Cable-stayed; Steel girder deck, concrete pylons 145+300+145	M0 motorway Budapest Ring Road; 4 lanes Danube	2008	Budapest; 47°36′26.6″N 19°05′32.6″E	Central Hungary	
3	Elisabeth Bridge (1903) destroyed in 1945	Erzsébet híd	290 m (950 ft)	379 m (1,243 ft)	Suspension; Chain bridge	Road bridge Trams in Budapest; Danube	1903	Budapest; 1st - 5th 47°29′27.2″N 19°02′56.7″E	Central Hungary	
4	Elisabeth Bridge	Erzsébet híd	290 m (950 ft)	380 m (1,250 ft)	Suspension; Steel girder deck, steel pylons	6 lanes road bridge Danube	1964	Budapest; 1st - 5th 47°29′27.4″N 19°02′57.2″E	Central Hungary	
5	Monostori Bridge	Monostori híd	252 m (827 ft)	600 m (2,000 ft)	Cable-stayed; Steel girder deck, steel pylon	2 lanes road bridge Danube	2020	Komárom–Komárno; 47°45′23.5″N 18°05′04.9″E	Central Transdanubia; Slovakia	
6	Széchenyi Chain Bridge	Széchenyi Lánchíd	202 m (663 ft)	380 m (1,250 ft)	Suspension; Chain bridge, wrought iron deck, masonry pylons 89+202+89	2 lanes road bridge Danube	1849	Budapest; 5th 47°29′56.3″N 19°02′36.7″E	Central Hungary	
7	Liberty Bridge (Budapest)	Szabadság híd	179 m (587 ft)	337 m (1,106 ft)	Truss; Steel; 79+179+79	2 lanes road bridge Trams in Budapest (lines 2, 2B, 2M); Danube	1896	Budapest; 5th - 11th 47°29′08.7″N 19°03′17.7″E	Central Hungary	
8	Petőfi Bridge	Petőfi híd	154 m (505 ft)	514 m (1,686 ft)	Truss; Steel; 112+154+112	4 lanes road bridge Trams in Budapest (lines 4, 6); Danube	1937	Budapest; 5th - 11th 47°28′43.9″N 19°03′48.2″E	Central Hungary	
9	Belvárosi Bridge	Belvárosi híd	147 m (482 ft)		Arch; Steel tied arch Bow-string bridge	2 lanes road bridge Tisza	1948	Szeged; 46°15′03.1″N 20°09′12.1″E	Southern Great Plain	
10	Bertalan Bridge	Bertalan híd	141 m (463 ft)	762 m (2,500 ft)	Beam bridge Steel	Main road 43; 4 lanes Tisza	1979	Szeged; 46°15′21.8″N 20°09′54.3″E	Southern Great Plain	
11	József Beszédes Bridge	Beszédes József híd	136 m (446 ft)(x2)	509 m (1,670 ft)	Truss; Steel; 109+2x136+109	Main road 52; 2 lanes Danube	1930	Dunaföldvár–Solt; 46°48′37.9″N 18°55′59.3″E	Southern Transdanubia; Southern Great Plain	
12	Vámosszabadi Bridge	Vámosszabadi híd	133 m (436 ft)	363 m (1,191 ft)	Truss; Steel; 114+133+114	Main road 14; 2 lanes Danube	1942	Vámosszabadi–Medveďov; 47°47′36.5″N 17°39′05.4″E	Western Transdanubia; Slovakia	
13	Szent László Bridge	Szent László híd	120 m (390 ft)(x3)	917 m (3,009 ft)	Box girder Steel; 80+3x120+80	M9 motorway 2 lanes Danube	2003	Szekszárd; 46°21′08.1″N 18°53′43.9″E	Southern Transdanubia	
14	Kőröshegyi Viaduct	Kőröshegyi völgyhíd	120 m (390 ft)(x13)	1,872 m (6,142 ft)	Box girder Prestressed concrete 95+13x120+95	M7 motorway European route E71; 4 lanes	2007	Kőröshegy; 46°48′59.8″N 17°54′07.3″E	Southern Transdanubia	
15	Mária Valéria Bridge	Mária Valéria híd	119 m (390 ft)	514 m (1,686 ft)	Truss; Steel; 85+102+119+102+85	2 lanes road bridge Danube	1895	Esztergom–Štúrovo; 47°47′43.0″N 18°43′47.6″E	Central Transdanubia; Slovakia	
16	Ferenc Deák Bridge	Deák Ferenc híd	108 m (354 ft)(x3)	770 m (2,530 ft)	Box girder Steel; Twin bridges 3x73+3x108+3x73	M0 motorway 8 lanes Budapest Ring Road; Danube	1990; 2013	Budapest 22nd–Szigetszentmiklós; 47°23′20.6″N 19°00′50.1″E	Central Hungary	
17	Árpád Bridge	Árpád híd	103 m (338 ft)(x2)	928 m (3,045 ft)	Beam bridge Steel; 82+103+103+82; 76+102+76	6 lanes road bridge Trams in Budapest (lines 1, 1M, 17, 41); Danube	1950	Budapest; 2nd - 13th 47°32′14.8″N 19°03′14.9″E	Central Hungary	
18	István Türr Bridge	Türr István híd	103 m (338 ft)(x4)	582 m (1,909 ft)	Truss; Steel; 4x103	Route 55; Bátaszék–Baja–Kiskunhalas railway Danube	1950	Baja, Hungary–Pörböly; 46°11′34.9″N 18°55′38.0″E	Southern Great Plain	
19	Komárom Railway Bridge	Komáromi vasúti összekötő híd	103 m (338 ft)	494 m (1,621 ft)	Truss; Steel; 4x103+82	Komárom–Nové Zámky railway Danube	1909	Komárom–Komárno; 47°45′24.2″N 18°05′13.2″E	Central Transdanubia; Slovakia	
20	Elisabeth Bridge (Komárom)	Erzsébet híd (Komárom)	102 m (335 ft)(x4)	411 m (1,348 ft)	Truss; Steel; 4x102	Main road 132; 2 lanes Danube	1892	Komárom–Komárno; 47°45′04.9″N 18°07′15.5″E	Central Transdanubia; Slovakia	

== Notes and references ==
- "The eight famous bridges of Budapest". bridgesofbudapest.com. Archived from the original on 13 July 2022.
- Nicolas Janberg. "International Database for Civil and Structural Engineering". Structurae.com.
- Others references

== See also ==
- Bridges of Budapest
- List of crossings of the Danube
- Transport in Hungary
- Highways in Hungary
- Rail transport in Hungary
- Geography of Hungary
