= Trams in Budapest =

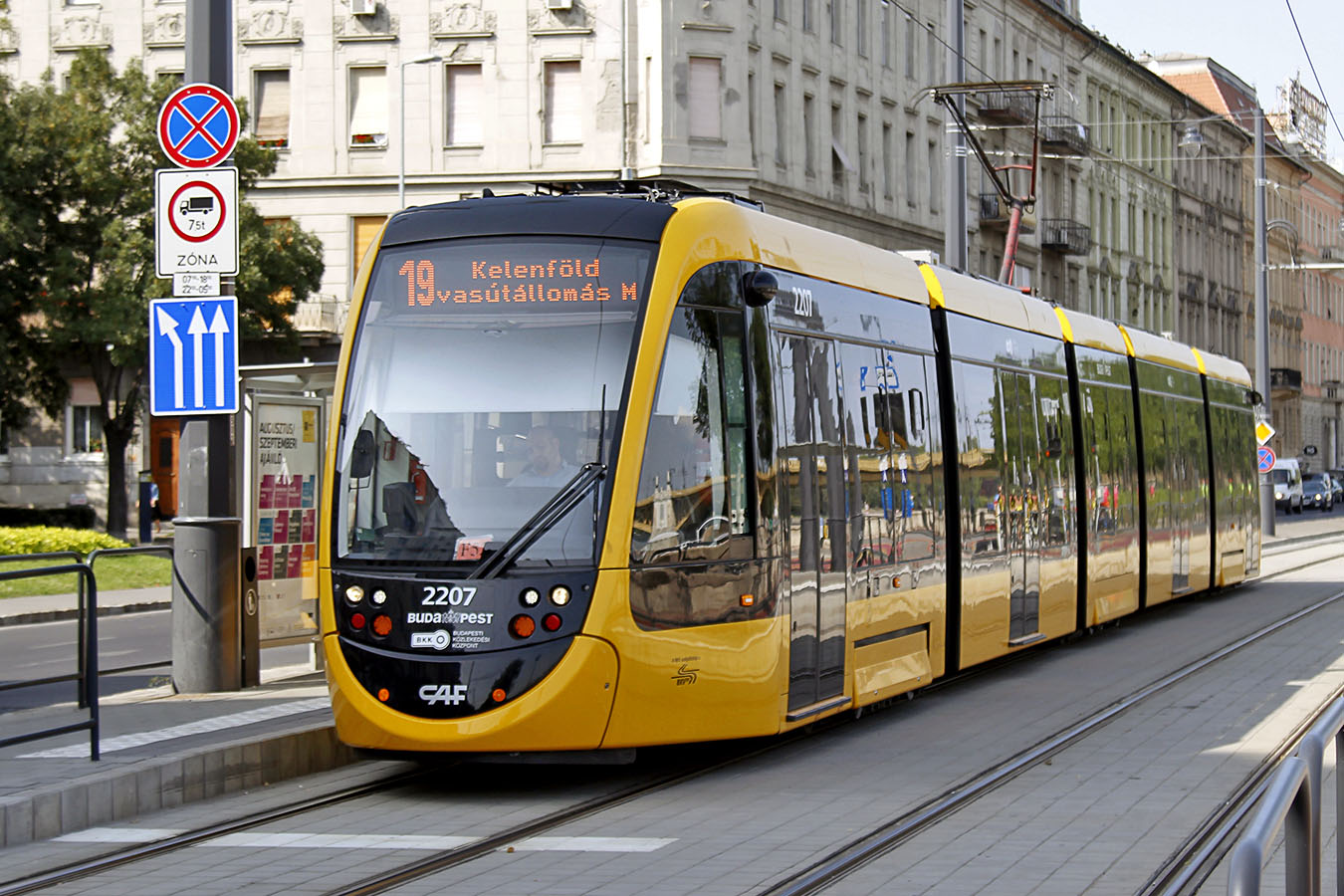
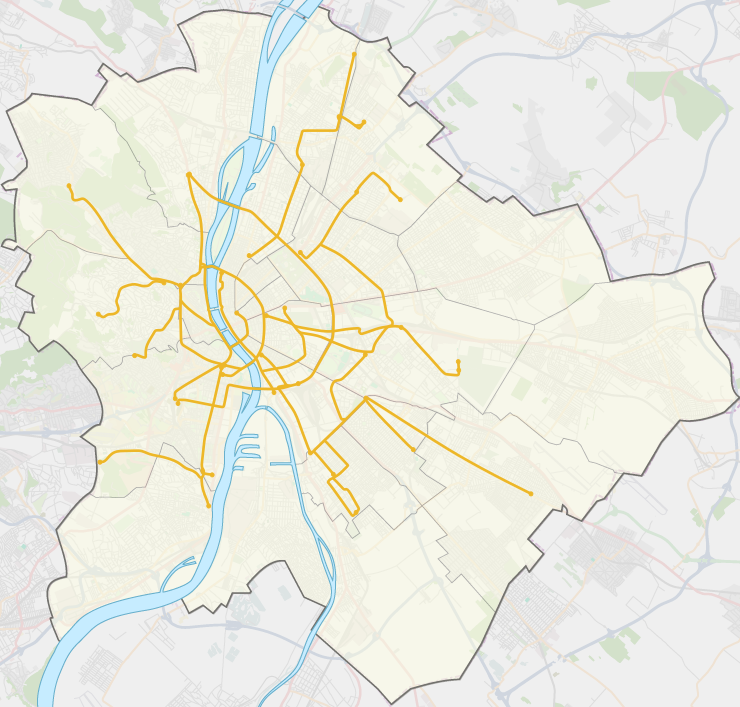
- Line 19 tram in Budapest.

Operation
- Locale: Budapest, Hungary
- Open: 1887. november 28.
- Status: Operational
- Routes: 37 (26 main, 10 supplemental, 1 cog-wheel railway)
- Owner: BKK Zrt.
- Operator: BKV Zrt.

Infrastructure
- Track gauge: 1,435 mm (4 ft 8 1/2 in) standard gauge
- Propulsion system: Electricity
- Stock: 610

Statistics
- Route length: 174 km (108 mi)
- Stops: 630
- Annual ridership (2011): 393.4 million
Horsecar era: 1866–1928
- Status: Closed
- Track gauge: 1,435 mm (4 ft 8 1/2 in) standard gauge
- Propulsion system: Horses
Steam-powered tram era: 1887–c.1900
- Status: Closed
- Propulsion system: Steam
Electric tram era: since 1887
- Status: Still running
- Operator: BKV Zrt.
- Track gauge: 1,000 mm (3 ft 3 3/8 in) metre gauge (1887); 1,435 mm (4 ft 8 1/2 in) standard gauge (1889 on)
- Propulsion system: Electricity
- Electrification: 600 V, DC, overhead wire
- Website: https://bkk.hu/en/ Budapesti Közlekedési Központ (BKK) (in English)

The tram network of Budapest is part of the mass transit system of Budapest, the capital city of Hungary. Tram lines serve as the second-most important backbone of the transit system after the bus network, carrying almost 100 million more passengers annually than the Budapest Metro. In operation since 1866, the Budapest tram network is among the world's largest tram networks by route length—operating on 174 kilometres (108 mi) of total route—and is the busiest in the world.

As of 2023, the tram network is made up of 35 regular lines (26 main lines and 9 supplemental lines) and the Budapest Cog-wheel Railway (signed as route 60). The system is operated by Budapesti Közlekedési Zrt. under the supervision of the municipal Budapesti Közlekedési Központ. Since 2016, the system uses the world's longest 9-sectioned articulated tram vehicle, the CAF Urbos 3/9, on route 1.

== History ==
=== The early days ===
The first horse-tram line in Budapest was inaugurated on 30 July 1866 between Újpest-Városkapu and Kálvin tér, through Váci út. Over a year before, on 22 May 1865, the Count Sándor Károlyi founded the PKVT (Pesti Közúti Vaspálya Társaság (English: Pest Public Road Rail Tracks Company)). Horse tramlines in Buda proper soon followed, built by the competing Buda Public Road Rail Tracks Company (BKVT).

By 1885, Budapest had as many as 15 horsecar lines, but it had since become obvious that the technology had become obsolete. A steam-driven suburban railway line from Közvágóhíd (Slaughterhouse) to Soroksár, which was run by HÉV, was separately introduced in 1887, and two more lines soon followed.

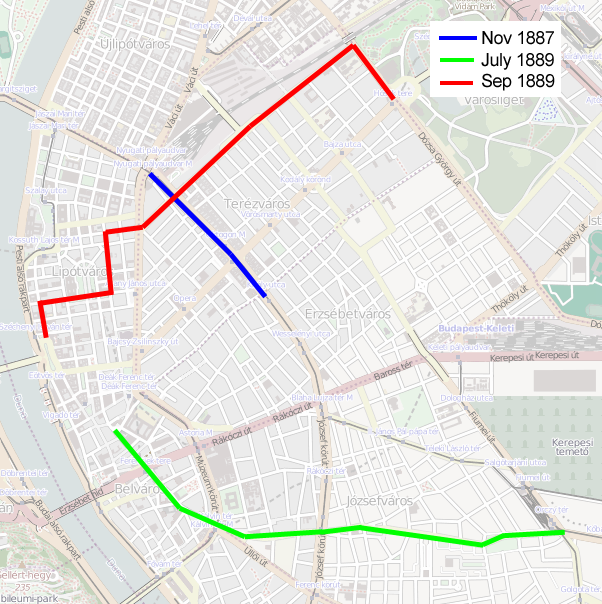
The first electric tram lines in Budapest (1887–1889).

Around this same time, Mór Balázs suggested that a new, electric tram system should be introduced to Budapest. It was Gábor Baross, then secretary of state at the Ministry of Community Service and Transportation who authorised the construction of the first test tram line between Nyugati railway station and Király utca. Balázs teamed up with Siemens & Halske and Lindheim és Társa and formed a new corporation: BVV (Budapesti Városi Vasút (English: Budapest City Railroad)). The construction works (carried out by Siemens & Halske) started on October 1, 1887 and the line was opened on November 28, 1887. The track gauge of this first line was 1,000 mm (3 ft 3 3/8 in) metre gauge and electricity was supplied to the cars from below to avoid cables hanging across the street.

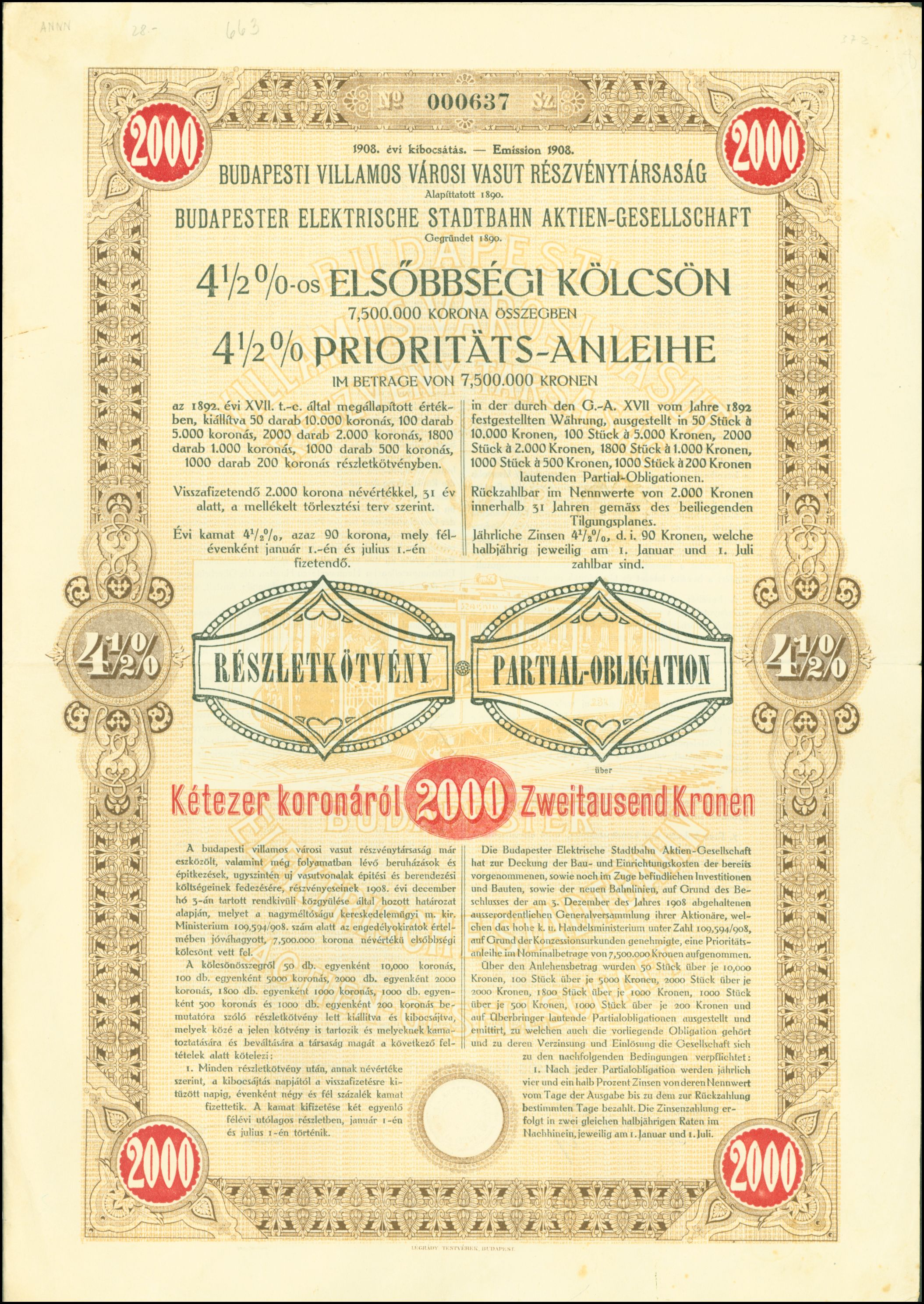
Bond of the Budapesti Villamos Városi Vasut Részvénytársaság, issued 31. December 1908

The second step in the expansion of the system were two 1,435 mm (4 ft 8 1/2 in) standard gauge lines: on July 20, 1889 the second line, which spanned from Egyetem tér to Fiumei út via Kálvin tér, was opened. It was designed so that in case of a power failure steam engines could tow the carriages. The third line, also standard gauge, was opened on September 10, 1889 and ran from the Hungarian Academy of Sciences to Andrássy út.

Even though not a tram line per se, the first underground line in Continental Europe, the Millennium Underground Railway must also be noted. It was built using a cut-and-cover method between 1894 and 1896 and was first named FJFVV (Ferenc József Földalatti Villamos Vasút (English: Franz Joseph Underground Electric Railway)) after emperor Franz Joseph. It used electric cars from the very beginning.

In the first years, trams had no numbers but coloured circular signals instead, for example, a simple red, green, blue or black disk; a red disk with a vertical white stripe or a cross; a white disk with a green 8-pointed green star, etc. This, of course, quickly became very cumbersome so around 1900, when there were already 30 lines, each line got a number – BVV, which was renamed to BVVV (Budapesti Villamos Városi Vasút (English: Budapest Electric City Railroad)) got the even numbers; odd numbers were assigned to a rival transport company, BKVT (Budapesti Közúti Vaspálya Társaság (English: Budapest Road Rail Company)).

In the last year of the First World War, there were already 1,072 tram trains running in Budapest or on the outskirts of the capital. This fleet carried more than 382 million passengers in Budapest in 1918.

The dynamically growing network brought new companies: two of them served Újpest, the northern part of Pest, one Pestszentlőrinc, which then was a separate town, and one the southern part of Buda and the then-separate village Budafok. These companies were joined together in 1923 by the name BSZKRT (Budapest Székesfővárosi Közlekedési Rt. (English: Budapest Capital Transport Co)). It was during 1939-1944 that the most tram lines (66) existed in the city.

=== After World War II ===
Animated gif of tram line changes in Budapest between 1968 and 2005. Looks best in full resolution.

The siege of Budapest left the city with a crippled infrastructure: many houses were destroyed, as well as the bridges bombed, electric cables torn. It was of course of utmost importance to restore the transport network, however, many trams were destroyed either in the siege or in a depot fire that occurred in 1947. This might have been the cause that decisionmakers suggested that trolleybus lines should replace trams in the city centre. Along with cost considerations, trolleybuses might be better suited for the downtown area than trams: they turn more easily and produce significantly less noise.

While some tram lines were abolished in favour of trolleybuses, the expansion of the system did not stop. Near Nyugati railway station a new junction of tram lines were built to transport people back and forth to the factories in Angyalföld and Újpest and line 33 through the newly built Árpád Bridge. Line 4 on the Buda side and the tracks on Nagy Lajos király útja were also extended around 1960. The reconstruction of Erzsébet Bridge in 1964 played a significant role in the revival of the tram network: five lines started using it after its opening.

In 1968 there were 83 tram lines in Budapest (10 of which night services) thus reaching the largest extent of the network since World War II, decline was imminent. This happened partly because of the replacement of tram lines with single track and old vehicles with autobuses but also due to the construction of underground lines M2 and M3, which were then thought to be a replacement for the tram lines that used to run above them. In 1972 tram lines on Erzsébet Bridge and Rákóczi út were abolished, then until 1982 tram lines were removed along M3 as well thereby effectively erasing 40 km of rail tracks, around 20% of the Budapest tram network. Along with lines in the city centre, most of the lines in Újpest and some in the southern parts of Pest were demolished.

While many lines were closed down, a significant one was rising: tram 33 was shut down for the renovation of Árpád Bridge in 1981 but when the bridge was reopened, a new line was born on the eastern end of the outer ring road, Hungária körgyűrű, line 1. It has been under construction ever since with segments opened in 1984, 1987, 1990, 1993, 1995, 2000, 2015 and 2019. In 2015 the line crossed to the Buda side of Rákóczi Bridge which was inaugurated in 1995 and was designed for the tram to cross it.

=== Present and future ===
As of 2024, it seems that the local governments have shifted towards a more tram-friendly view: line 1 and 3 were renovated and line 1 was extended to Kelenföld vasútállomás. Line 42 is planned to reach the centre of Kispest, and line 47 and 49 are planned to reach Lehel tér, so they can connect into line 12 and line 14, forming a transfer-free connection between Újpest and Budafok.

== Lines and developments ==
As of 2023, it was composed of 35 regular lines (26 main lines and 9 supplemental lines denoted by an 'A' or 'B' after the route number) and the Budapest Cog-wheel Railway. Only route 6 offers 24-hour service, while most other lines run between 5 a.m. and 11 p.m.

Line	Route	Length (km)	Stations	Ride time (minutes)	Rolling stock	Notes
1	Bécsi út / Vörösvári út ↔ Kelenföld vasútállomás	18.3	32	52	CAF Urbos 3; Siemens Combino; ČKD Tatra T5C5; ČKD–BKV Tatra T5C5K	
1A	Bécsi út / Vörösvári út ↔ Népliget	11.2	20	31	ČKD Tatra T5C5; ČKD–BKV Tatra T5C5K	
2	Jászai Mari tér ↔ Közvágóhíd	6.0	13	20	Ganz CSMG; Ganz KCSV–7	
2B	Jászai Mari tér ↔ Pesterzsébet, Pacsirtatelep	13.9 Southbound 15.0 Northbound	33 / 35	48 / 58	Ganz KCSV–7	
3	Mexikói út ↔ Gubacsi út / Határ út	13.3	32	51	CAF Urbos 3, TW 6000	
4	Széll Kálmán tér ↔ Újbuda-központ	8.5	19	30	Siemens Combino	
6	Széll Kálmán tér ↔ Móricz Zsigmond körtér	8.3	19	29	Siemens Combino	(Note: 24 hour service)
12	Lehel tér M ↔ Rákospalota, Kossuth utca	4.7	22	32	Tatra T5C5K	
12A	Angyalföld kocsiszín ↔ Rákospalota, Kossuth utca	4.7	11	17	Tatra T5C5K	
14	Lehel tér ↔ Káposztásmegyer, Megyeri út	11.	24	33	CAF Urbos 3; ČKD–BKV Tatra T5C5K	
17	Bécsi út / Vörösvári út ↔ Savoya Park	14.7	37	51	CAF Urbos 3; Tatra T5C5; Tatra T5C5K	
19	Bécsi út / Vörösvári út ↔ Kelenföld vasútállomás	11.2	24	38	CAF Urbos 3; Ganz CSMG	
23	Jászai Mari tér ↔ Keleti pályaudvar	9.4	20	32 / 34	Ganz KCSV–7	(Note: Formerly numbered 2M)
24	Keleti pályaudvar ↔ Közvágóhíd	5.2	12	19	Ganz KCSV–7; TW 6000	
28	Blaha Lujza tér (Népszínház utca) ↔ Izraelita temető	10.8	26	39	Tatra T5C5; TW 6000	(Note: Daytime only, does not run on Saturdays)
28A	Blaha Lujza tér (Népszínház utca) ↔ Új köztemető (Kozma utca)	10.1	25	37	Tatra T5C5; TW 6000	
37	Blaha Lujza tér (Népszínház utca) ↔ Új köztemető (Kozma utca)	9.7	23	30	Tatra T5C5; TW 6000	(Note: Weekday peak hours only)
37A	Blaha Lujza tér (Népszínház utca) ↔ Sörgyár	5.8	14	19	TW 6000	
41	Bécsi út / Vörösvári út ↔ Kamaraerdei Ifjúsági Park	18.4	39	62	Tatra T5C5K	
42	Határ út ↔ Kispest, Tulipán utca	3.0	7	8–9	CAF Urbos 3; TW 6000	
47	Deák Ferenc tér ↔ Városház tér	8.8	21	31	Ganz CSMG	
48	Deák Ferenc tér ↔ Savoya Park	8.0	18	27	Ganz CSMG	(Note: Runs only on Saturday)
49	Deák Ferenc tér ↔ Kelenföld vasútállomás	5.4	12	20–21	Ganz CSMG	
50	Határ út ↔ Pestszentlőrinc, Béke tér	8.0	20	24–26	CAF Urbos 3, TW 6000	
51	Mester utca / Ferenc körút ↔ Nagysándor József utca	6.5 / 8	15 / 24	24 / 30	TW 6000	
51A	Mester utca / Ferenc körút ↔ Koppány utca	2.2	8 / 7	10-11	TW 6000	(Note: Mornings and evenings only)
52	Határ út ↔ Pesterzsébet, Pacsirtatelep	6.9	17 / 16	25	TW 6000	
56	Hűvösvölgy ↔ Városház tér	16.9	37	55	Tatra T5C5K	(Note: Weekday peak hours only)
56A	Hűvösvölgy ↔ Móricz Zsigmond körtér	11.2	23	35	Tatra T5C5K	
59	Szent János Kórház ↔ Márton Áron tér	5.2	15	19-20	Tatra T5C5K	
59A	Széll Kálmán tér ↔ Márton Áron tér	4.1	12	15-16	Tatra T5C5K	
59B	Hűvösvölgy ↔ Márton Áron tér	10.6	26	34	Tatra T5C5K	(Note: School day mornings only)
60	Városmajor ↔ Széchenyihegy	3.7	7	15	Custom SGP MUs	(Note: Cog-wheel railway)
61	Hűvösvölgy ↔ Móricz Zsigmond körtér	10.9	26	33-34	Tatra T5C5K	
62	Rákospalota, MÁV-telep ↔ Blaha Lujza tér (Népszínház utca)	13.5	33 / 34	50-52	TW 6000	(Note: Weekday peak hours only)
62A	Rákospalota, MÁV-telep ↔ Kőbánya alsó vasútállomás (Mázsa tér)	9.2	23	34	TW 6000	(Note: Weekdays only)
69	Mexikói út ↔ Újpalota, Erdőkerülő utca	6.5	15	21-22	TW 6000	

=== Discontinued lines ===
It is not always straightforward to decide whether a tram line still exists in Budapest since throughout the decades some numbers may have been carried by several lines (not at the same time though), so some numbers might have appeared and disappeared throughout time. Some lines were assigned new numbers so even though there is no line with that specific number, there is a line on exactly the same route. Of course, existing lines might have been lengthened or shortened, so this also makes it hard to exactly define a tram line. Still, the following table tries to summarize these data – termini and dates refer to the last time the number was used.

Number of the line	Termini	Inauguration and disappearance
2A	Jászai Mari tér – Boráros tér H	1973–2013
5	Flórián tér – Hévízi úti lakótelep	1950–1974
7	Óbudai kocsiszín – Margit híd, budai hídfő	1946–1961
7i	Fóti út – Rákospalota, Kossuth utca	1967-1974
8	Újpesti piac – Megyeri út	1955–1980
9	Batthyány tér – Budafok, Városház tér	1920–1986
9A	Móricz Zsigmond körtér – Albertfalva kitérő	1961–1972
10	Rákospalota, Kossuth utca – Megyeri csárda	1954–1985
11	Margit híd, budai hídfő – Bécsi út	1950–1981
13	Örs vezér tere – Gubacsi út	1955–2001
15	Jászai Mari tér – Újpesti vasúti híd	1940–1977
15A	Jászai Mari tér – Váci út	1963–1977
18	Széll Kálmán tér - Savoya Park	1949-2016
20	Ganz gyár – Ferenc körút	until 1977
22	Nagyvásártelep – Boráros tér	1932–1970
23	Baross tér (Festetics György utca) – Ferenc körút	1928–2000
23A	Népliget – Közvágóhíd	1953-1964, 1976-1980
24G	Keleti pályaudvar – Mester utca / Ferenc körút	2015–2020
25	Állatkert (Budapest Zoo) – Thököly út	1920–1973
26	Rókus kórház – Eskü tér	1910–1956
26A	Kőrösi Csoma út – Orczy tér	1942–1956
27	Nagyvárad tér – Keleti Pályaudvar	1957–1959
29	József körút – BNV főberjárat	1925–1995
29Y	Baross tér (Festetics György utca) – BNV főberjárat	1974–1995
31	Közvágóhíd – Pacsirtatelep	1973–1995
32i	Pesterzsébet, Nagy Sándor utca - Ganz-MÁVAG	1967–1975
33	Nyugati pályaudvar – Óbudai kocsiszín	1950–1981
34	Közvágóhíd – Kálvin tér	1949–1951
35	Pacsirtatelep – Határ út – Pacsirtatelep	1951-1953
36	Keleti pályaudvar – Kápolna tér	1945–1994
38	Rókus kórház – Ferenc József laktanya	1920–1970
39	Keleti pályaudvar – Új köztemető	1927–1932
40	Pestszentimre – Pestszentlőrinc	1947–1975
43	Nagytétény – Móricz Zsigmond körtér	1963–1972
44	Zugló, Rákospatak – Keleti pályaudvar	1972–1995
45	Március 15. tér – Keleti Pályaudvar	1952–1963
46	Petőfi híd, budai hídfő – Déli pályaudvar	1958–1963
47B	Kamaraerdei Ifjúsági Park – Deák Ferenc tér	2016–2020
48	Nyugati pályaudvar – Albertfalva kitérő	1957–1960
53	Nyugati pályaudvar – Kispest, határ út	1950–1963
56	Moszkva tér – Hűvösvölgy	1930–2008
67	Keleti pályaudvar – Rákospalota, MÁV telep	1902–1997

== Rolling stock ==
=== Current fleet ===
As of 24 June 2021

Image	Tram type or subtype	Number of cars		Fleet number	Constructed	Transportation in Budapest	Depot Allocations
Image	Tram type or subtype	Current	Original	Fleet number	Constructed	Transportation in Budapest	Depot Allocations
	Ganz, CSMG–1	3	(35)	1301, 1313, 1318	1967–1968	since 1967	Baross, Budafok*, Ferencváros, Kelenföld
	Ganz, CSMG–2	27	(85)	1342, 1349, 1360, 1363–1366, 1369, 1402, 1404, 1407, 1418–1419, 1427, 1433–1434, 1437–1445, 1448, 1450–1451	1970–1972, 1975	since 1970	Baross, Budafok*, Ferencváros, Kelenföld
	Ganz, CSMG–3	1	(29)	1461	1977	since 1977	Kelenföld
	Ganz, KCSV–7	30		1321, 1325–1332, 1335–1337, 1339–1340, 1343–1348, 1350–1356, 1359, 1362, 1370	1997–1999	since 1997	Ferencváros
	ČKD, Tatra T5C5	12	(322)	4000, 4014–4015, 4021, 4034–4036, 4044–4045, 4048, 4054–4055, 4154–4155, 4162, 4166–4167, 4171, 4200, 4272, 4277, 4288, 4320, 4322, 4325, 4332, 4335–4336, 4339, 4341, 4346, 4349	1978, 1980, 1984	since 1978	Angyalföld, Baross, Budafok*
	ČKD, Tatra T5C5K; Tatra T5C5K2; Tatra T5C5K2M	302		4001–4004, 4005, 4006–4012, 4013, 4016–4020, 4022–4033, 4037–4043, 4046–4047, 4049–4053, 4056–4120, 4122–4153, 4156–4161, 4163–4165, 4168–4170, 4201, 4202–4221, 4223–4271, 4273–4276, 4278–4287, 4289–4319, 4321, 4323–4324, 4326–4331, 4333–4334, 4337–4338, 4340, 4342–4345, 4347–4348	2002–2004, 2009–	since 2003	Szépilona, Angyalföld
	Duewag TW 6000	46	(93)	1500–1508, 1510–1521, 1523–1524, 1526–1528, 1531–1538, 1540–1564, 1566–1573, 1575–1587, 1589–1590, 1592	1975–1978	since 2001	Ferencváros, Száva, Zugló
	LHB TW 6000	25		1600–1602, 1604, 1606–1607, 1610–1624	1980–1982	since 2012	Száva
	Siemens, Combino Supra	39	(40)	2001–2040	2006–2007	since 2006	Hungária
	CAF Urbos 3 (9-module)	22		2101–2122	2015–2025	since 2016	Budafok*, Hungária, Száva
	CAF Urbos 3 (5-module)	102		2201–2302	2015–2025	since 2015	Budafok*, Hungária, Száva

== Depots ==
Name	Location	Built	Operated vehicle types	Operated lines
Angyalföld kocsiszín	Budapest IV., Pozsonyi út 1.	1896	Tatra T5C5, Tatra T5C5K2	1, 12, 14, 17
Baross kocsiszín	Budapest VIII., Baross utca 132.	1889	Tatra T5C5	1
Budafok kocsiszín	Budapest XI., Fehérvári út 247.	1899	Tatra T5C5, Tatra T5C5K, CAF Urbos 3	1, 17, 19, 41, 56
Ferencváros kocsiszín	Budapest IX., Könyves Kálmán körút 7.	1904	Ganz CSMG, Ganz KCSV–7, TW 6000	2, 24, 28, 28A, 37, 37A, 51, 51A
Hungária kocsiszín	Budapest VIII., Törökbecse utca 1.	1912	Combino Supra Budapest NF12B, CAF Urbos 3	1, 4, 6
Kelenföld kocsiszín	Budapest XI., Bartók Béla út 137.	1912	Ganz CSMG	19, 47, 48, 49
Száva kocsiszín	Budapest IX., Üllői út 197.	1913	TW 6000, CAF Urbos 3	3, 42, 50, 52
Szépilona kocsiszín	Budapest II., Budakeszi út 9-11.	1870	Tatra T5C5K	56, 56A, 59, 59A, 59B, 61
Zugló kocsiszín	Budapest XIV., Thököly út 173.	1899	TW 6000, nostalgia Ganz UVs	3, 62, 62A, 69

== Trivia ==
Budapest won the inaugural European Tramdriver Championship in 2012 and repeated that feat in 2016 and 2024, making the city the record titleholder as of 2024.

== See also ==
- BKV Zrt.
- Budapest Castle Hill Funicular
- Budapest Cog-wheel Railway
- Budapest Metro
- List of town tramway systems in Hungary
