= Türr István Bridge =

Bridge located in Baja, Hungary

Türr István Bridge Türr István híd
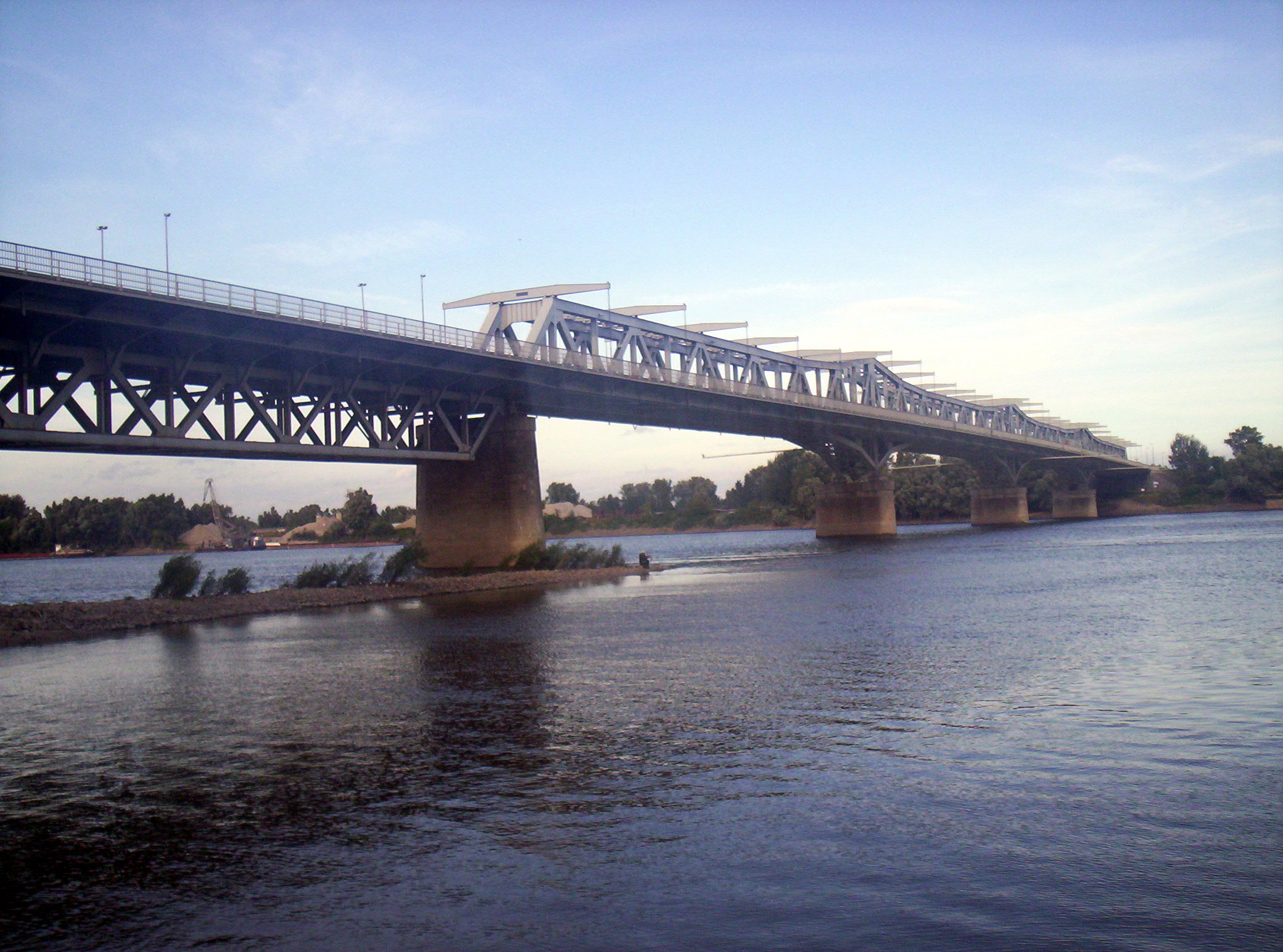
- The bridge, as seen in 2006
- Coordinates: 46°11′35″N 18°55′37″E
- Locale: Baja, Hungary
- Named for: István Türr

Characteristics
- Total length: 582 meters
- Height: 103.48 meters
- No. of lanes: 1

Statistics
- Toll: none

Location
- Interactive map of Türr István Bridge

The Türr István Bridge, also known as the Bajai Bridge, is a metal-framed bridge located in Baja, Hungary that provides a connection from Transdanubia to the Danube-Tisza junction.

== History ==
The bridge was built between 1906 and 1908, at that time it was the only railway bridge south of Budapest. Within Hungary, this is still true today, since railway traffic ceased in 2001 on the Dunaföldvár Bridge. It was destroyed in 1944, but due to its strategic role, it was soon rebuilt, and was opened to traffic again in 1950. In order to serve the increased passenger car traffic, two side consoles were built on the stumps of the consoles in 1988, after which road vehicles lighter than 3.5 tons could travel on a separate lane, this was handed over on August 30, 1990, but trucks still had to use the railway track, which sometimes caused heavy traffic jams. Due to the load, the central track needed to be repaired more and more often, the reconstruction of the bridge became inevitable, which took place from 1998 to 1999 and was opened to traffic on October 21, 1999. At that time, road and rail traffic were divided into two. Since then, trains can pass through it at a speed of 80 km/h.

After the war, the wreckage of the bridge that fell into the Danube was revived, at the other end of the country, on another river. 70% of the steel material of the Hernád Bridge on the road between Gibárt and Encs, designed in 1949 by Sándor Jakab and József Kopácsi and built by the Mélypító és Mélyfúró Vállalat, is from the Baja bridge.

The height of the bridge opening on the left side is 8.71 meters, on the right side 8.40 meters, the width of the navigable bridge opening is 60 meters. It consists of a four-span riverbed bridge and a three-span floodplain bridge. It was named after István Türr, a native of the town.

== See also ==
- List of bridges in Hungary
