= Budapest Tram Line 1 =

Tram line in Budapest, Hungary

Overview
- Status: Operational
- Line number: Line 1
- Termini: Bécsi út / Vörösvári út; Kelenföld vasútállomás
- Stations: 31

Service
- Type: Rapid transit
- System: Trams in Budapest
- Operator: BKV

History
- Opened: 1984

Technical
- Line length: 16.5 km (10 mi)

The Tram Line 1 of Budapest (in Hungarian: budapesti 1-es jelzésű villamosvonal) is a line operated by BKK Zrt., the transport authority of Budapest. It was commissioned in 1984 between Bécsi út / Vörösvári út and Lehel utca. It then has numerous extension phases, which in 2000 make it possible to connect north to south of Pest along the great ring road (Róbert Károly körút - Hungária körút - Könyves Kálmán körút), between the Árpád híd and Rákóczi híd bridges. Since March 2015, the line also crosses the Danube in its southern part, and it was further extended in 2019 to Kelenföld vasútállomás M. It now runs between Bécsi út / Vörösvári út and Kelenföld vasútállomás.

== Line and Stations ==
Station	Connection	District	Neighborhood
Bécsi út / Vörösvári út	17, 19, 41 137, 160, 218, 237, 260, 260A, 800, 801, 815, 820, 830	3rd	Óbuda / Óbuda hegyvidéke
Óbudai rendelőintézet	137, 160, 218, 237, 260, 260A, 820, 830, 832, 840	3rd	Óbuda
Flórián tér	9, 29, 34, 106, 109, 111, 118, 134, 137, 218, 226, 237, 800, 801, 815, 820, 830, 832, 840	3rd	Óbuda
Szentlélek tér H HÉV station	29, 34, 106, 118, 134, 137, 218, 226, 237	3rd	Óbuda
Népfürdő utca / Árpád híd	15, 26, 34, 106, 115	13th	Vizafogó
Árpád híd M	26, 32, 34, 106, 115, 120, 800, 801, 815, 820, 830, 832, 840	13th	Vizafogó / Angyalföld
Lehel utca / Róbert Károly körút	14 105	13th	Angyalföld
Vágány utca / Róbert Károly körút	20E, 30, 30A, 32, 105, 230	13th	Angyalföld
Kacsóh Pongrác út		14th	Herminamező
Erzsébet királyné útja, aluljáró	3, 69 70 5	14th	Herminamező
Ajtósi Dürer sor		14th	Herminamező
Zugló vasútállomás MAV Station	72 5, 7, 7E, 8E, 108E, 110, 112, 133E MAV: 100, 100A, 142	14th	Herminamező / Istvánmező / Törökőr
Egressy út / Hungária körút	77	14th	Istvánmező / Törökőr
Puskás Ferenc Stadion M	75, 77, 80, 80A 95, 130, 195, 396, 397, 398, 399, 400, 402, 410, 412, 414, 422, 424, 430, 432, 434, 435, 436, 437, 438, 439, 440, 441, 442, 485, 486	14th, 8th, 10th	Istvánmező / Törökőr / Százados / Laposdűlő
Hős utca		8th, 10th	Százados / Laposdűlő
Hidegkuti Nándor Stadion	37, 37A	8th, 10th	Százados / Laposdűlő
Kőbányai út / Könyves Kálmán körút	28, 28A, 62 9, 217E	8th, 10th	Ganz / Laposdűlő
Vajda Péter utca	99	8th, 10th	Tisztviselőtelep / Népliget
Népliget M	194M, 200E, 254M, 607, 608, 626, 628, 629, 630, 631, 632, 633, 635, 636, 654, 655, 660, 661, 705	8th, 9th, 10th	Tisztviselőtelep / Népliget / Középső-Ferencváros / Külső-Ferencváros
Albert Flórián út	84M, 94M, 254M, 281, 294M	9th	Középső-Ferencváros / Külső-Ferencváros
Ferencváros vasútállomás – Málenkij Robot Emlékhely MÁV Station	51A 281 MAV: 1, 1A, 30A, 150	9th	Középső-Ferencváros / Külső-Ferencváros
Mester utca / Könyves Kálmán körút	51, 51A 281	9th	Középső-Ferencváros / Külső-Ferencváros
Közvágóhíd H HÉV Station	6, 7 2, 24 23, 23E, 54, 55, 179, 223M, 630, 631, 632, 635, 636, 655, 661	9th	Középső-Ferencváros / Külső-Ferencváros
Infopark	153, 154	11th	Infopark
Budafoki út / Dombóvári út	33, 133, 154	11th	Infopark / Nádorkert
Hauszmann Alajos utca / Szerémi út		11th	Kelenföld
Hengermalom út / Szerémi út	103	11th	Kelenföld
Etele út / Fehérvári út	17, 41, 47, 47B, 48, 56 103, 689, 691	11th	Kelenföld
Bikás park M	19, 49	11th	Kelenföld
Bártfai utca	58, 103	11th	Kelenföld
Kelenföld vasútállomás M	19, 49 8E, 40, 40B, 40E, 58, 87, 88, 88A, 88B, 101E, 101B, 103, 141, 150, 153, 154, 172, 173, 187, 188, 188E, 250, 250B, 251, 251A, 272, 689, 691, 710, 712, 715, 720, 722, 724, 725, 727, 731, 732, 734, 735, 737, 760, 762, 763, 767, 770, 774, 775, 777, 778, 798, 799 MAV: 1, 30, 30A, 40, 40A	11th	Kelenföld
