= Tatra T5C5 =

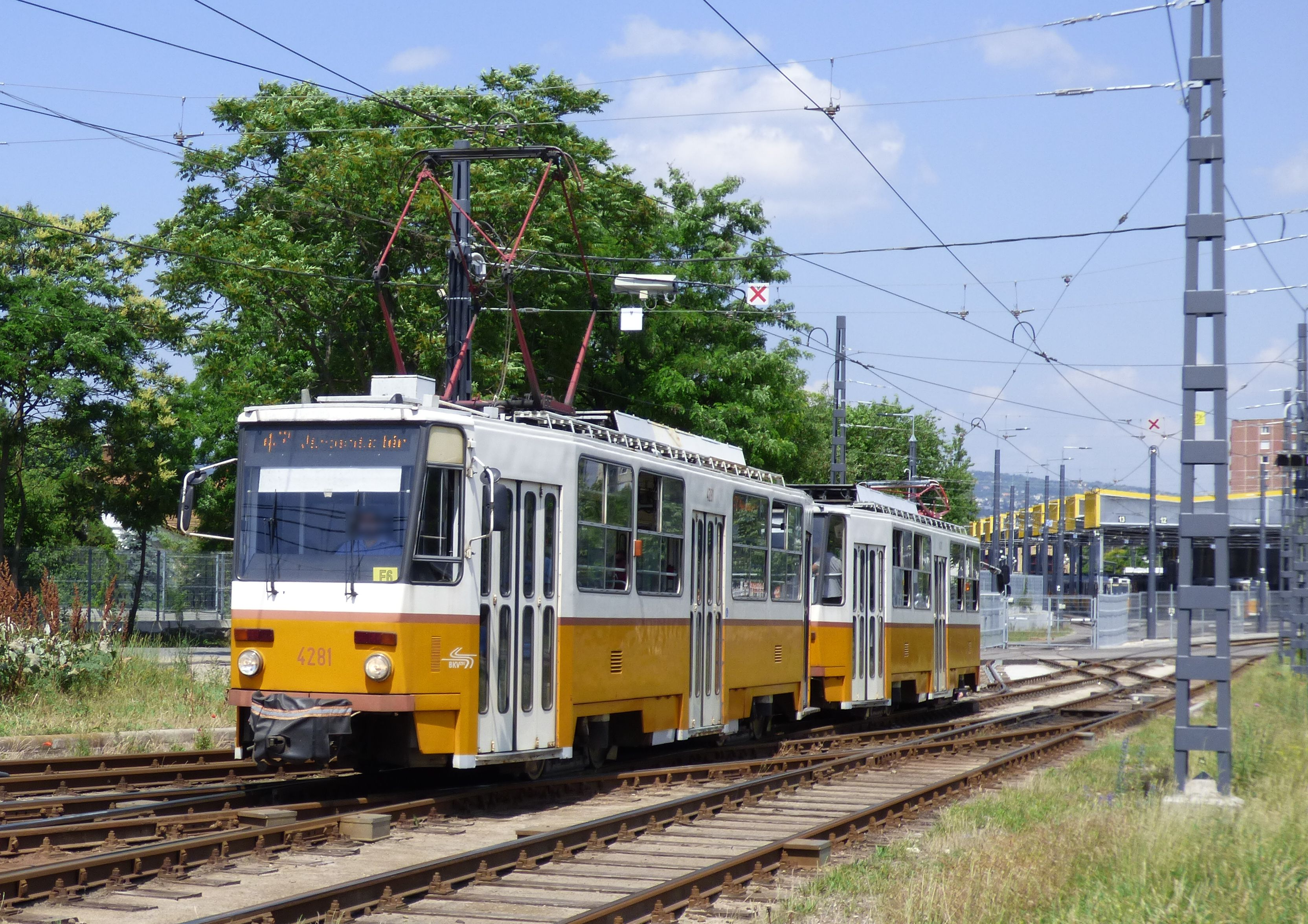
- Coupled Tatra T5C5 in Budapest
- Manufacturer: ČKD Tatra
- Assembly: (Czechoslovakia) Prague
- Family name: Tatra
- Constructed: 1978–1984
- Number built: 322
- Capacity: 100

Specifications
- Car length: 14,700 mm (48 ft 2 3/4 in)
- Width: 2,500 mm (8 ft 2 3/8 in)
- Height: 3,140 mm (10 ft 3 5/8 in)
- Doors: 6
- Maximum speed: 65 km/h (40 mph)
- Weight: 18,300 kg (40,300 lb)
- Engine type: TE 023
- Traction motors: 4
- Power output: 4×45
- Electric system(s): 600 V DC
- Current collection: pantograph
- Wheels driven: 4
- Bogies: 2
- Coupling system: Scharfenberg
- Track gauge: 1,435 mm (4 ft 8 1/2 in)

The Tatra T5C5 is a single-car tram built by ČKD Tatra in Prague in the late 1970s and early 1980s. In 1978, two prototypes were tested in Prague and Budapest. As they are no longer based on the PCC streetcar, they differed in many ways to earlier Tatra products, most notably that the vehicle was controlled by a hand lever rather than a foot pedal. Between 1978 and 1984, 322 vehicles were supplied to Budapest and, as of September 2020, all are in service with 2 of them being used exclusively for driver training purposes.

== Modernizations ==
Between 2002 and 2004 80 T5C5 units were extensively refurbished : the old drive system (resistor and series-parallel control) was replaced by chopper control using IGBT transistors. These trams have been renamed as "T5C5K". These units have been further modernized from 2009, their current type name is T5C5K2. A new program started in 2014, which refurbishes all remaining classic T5C5 units to the technical standards of T5C5K2. The 80 units that were refurbished between 2002 and 2004 are further being upgraded to the same technical specifications as the examples refurbished since 2014. As of September 2020, only 34 T5C5s are left in original condition with this number expected to decline further as more units are refurbished.

With the introduction of FUTÁR traffic control system at BKK, all T5C5 and T5C5K2 units got the FUTÁR controller and on-board unit, and new visual displays (1 front, 2 side, 1 inside). Some pins on the electrical coupling between units have been reused for FUTÁR's communication.

== Production ==
Country	City	Type	Delivery years	Number	Fleet number
Hungary	Budapest	T5C5	1978–1984	322	4000–4171, 4200–4349
Total:				322	

Note: This is the list of first owners. Stock may have later been resold to other cities not on this list.

== Photo gallery ==
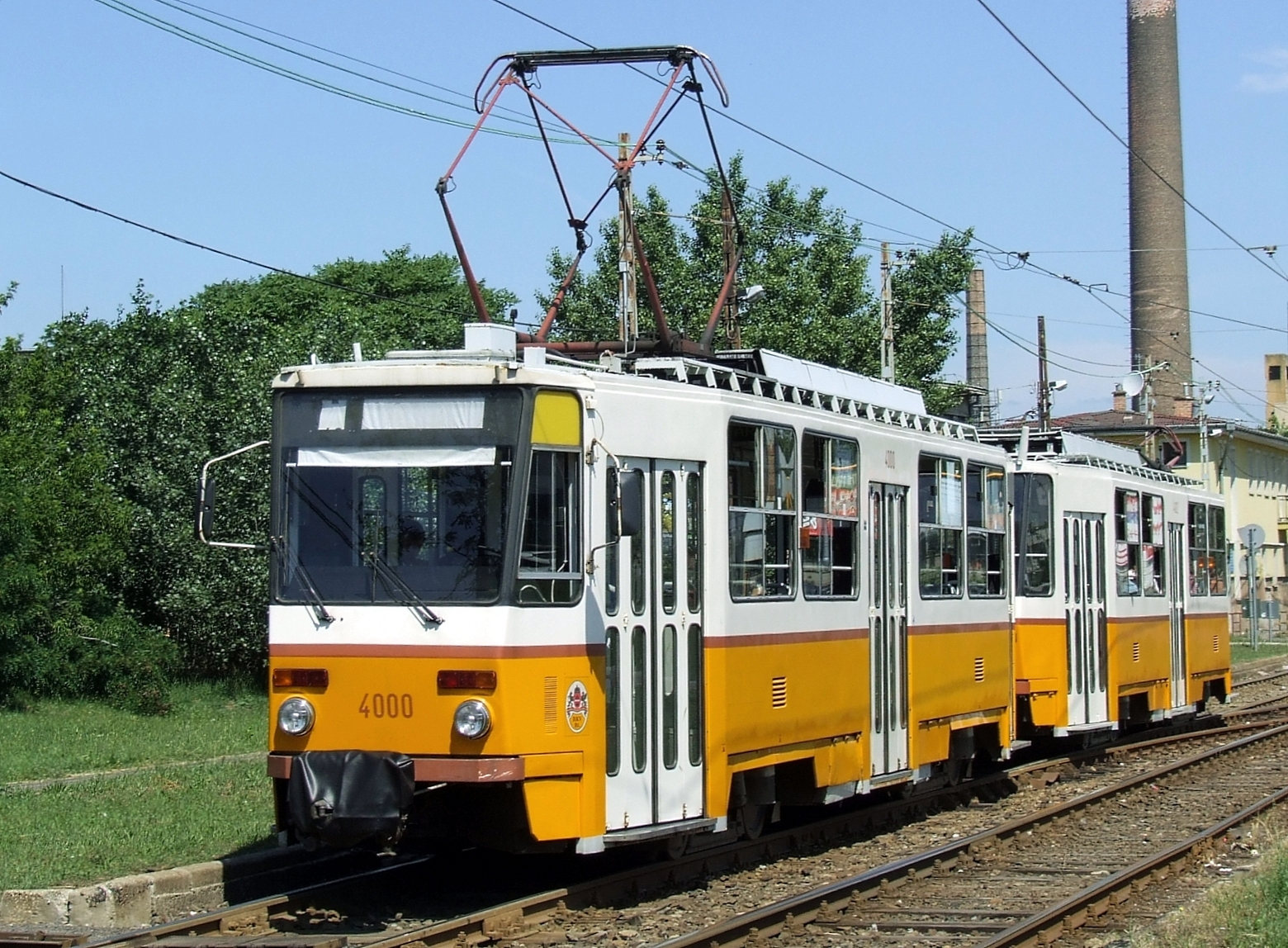
Prototype T5C5 (nr. 4000) in Budapest

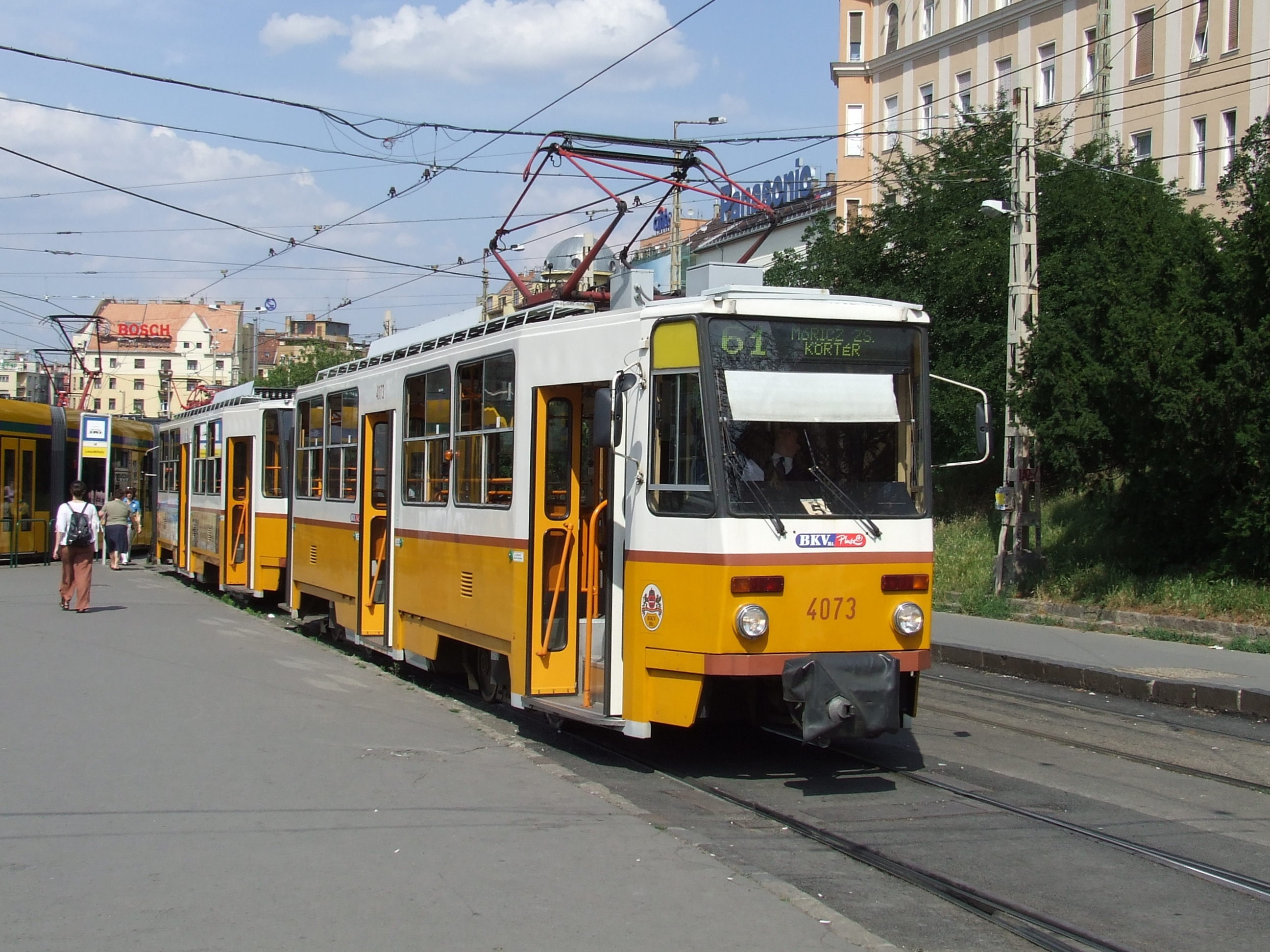
Tatra T5C5K in Széll Kálmán square, Budapest

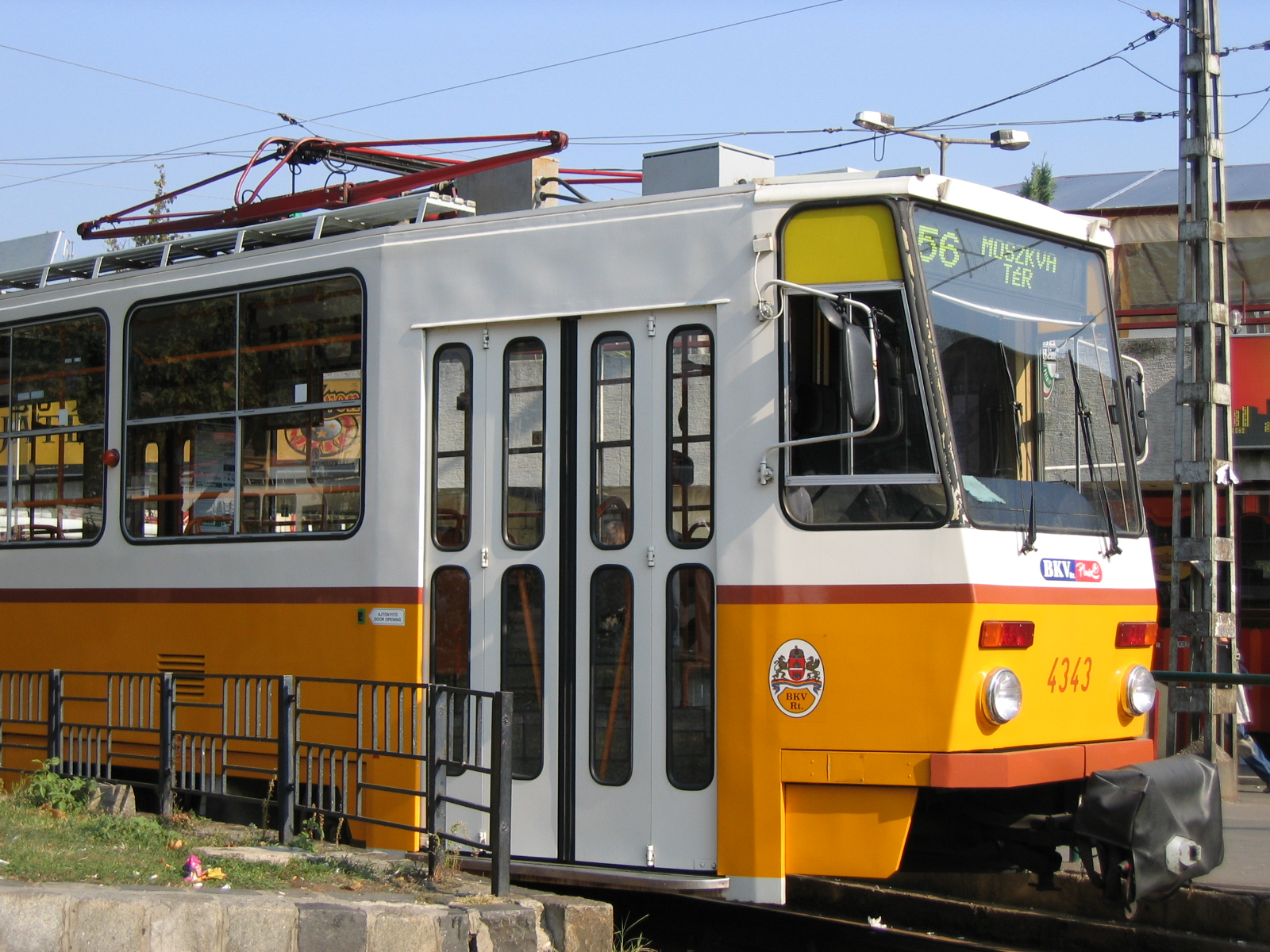
