= Hajógyári Island =

Island in Budapest, Hungary

Nickname: Shipyard Island
- Colourful trees in autumn, not far from the K-Bridge

- Location within Budapest Location within Hungary
- Interactive map of Hajógyári Island

Geography
- Location: Danube River
- Coordinates: 47°33′14″N 19°03′18″E

Administration
- Hungary

Hajógyári Island (Shipyard Island, for the shipyard companies that once operated there) or Óbudai-sziget (Óbuda Island, or Island of Old Buda) is the largest Danubian island in Budapest. Located in District III, it is a popular recreational area, year round. It is the home of the international Sziget Festival every August.

== Location and geography ==
Hajógyári was created from debris carried by the Danube River. It was originally a reef island made up of two adjoining land masses. Buda's coast is located between the river markers of 1651 and 1654 kilometers. It has an area of 108 hectares, a length of 2750 meters, and a maximum width of 500 meters, which is directly in line with the 1653-kilometer river marker. Obuda Island is separated by a 70- to 80-meter wide branch of the Danube. Not far from the northern end of the Újpest railway bridge, the southern end of the Árpád Bridge connects Buda and Pest.

== History ==
=== Early period ===
Originally known as Aquincum, by AD 89 it was home to a Roman legion of 6,000 men. A city grew around their fortress and became the capital of Pannonia Inferior in 106. By the end of the 2nd century, the population had reached 40,000. After 409, the Romans abandoned the area. A thousand years later, in the time of King Matthias Corvinus, it was a wooded hunting preserve, although many Romans ruins remained (and can still be seen there). In the 17th century, ownership passed to the Zichy family.

=== 19th century ===
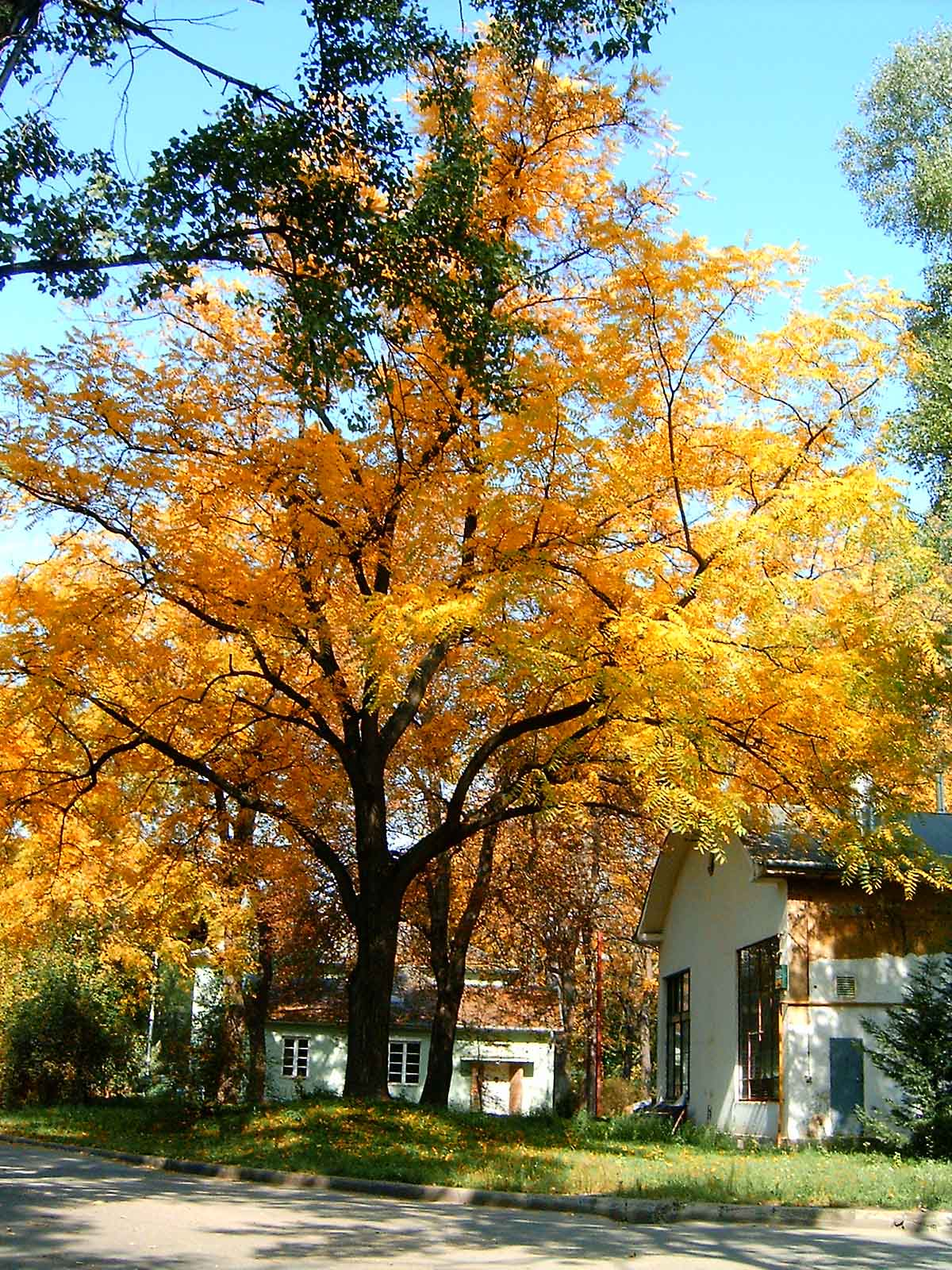
Óbudai-sziget

Its importance grew again in the 19th century, when Count István Széchenyi established the Óbuda Shipyard. The first ship built there, the Árpád-steamboat, was launched in 1836. It became the first industrial scale steamship building company in the Habsburg Empire. Roman perimeter walls were first found in 1836, when the Otter Bay dredges deepened the shipyard.

Twenty-eight hectares (69 acres) of the island's area were occupied by the shipyard. The remainder of the island was converted to agricultural use. For a long time, access to the island was by ferry only. The first permanent bridge was built in 1858 after a pedestrian bridge had been constructed.

=== 20th century ===
Around the 1900s Hajógyári was called the "Big Island". It got the nickname Shipyard Island because it was once the southern end of the Óbuda Shipyard. Industrial activity in these buildings ended and moved to different companies. The island's port is operated by the Yacht Club of Hungary. The former shipyard area was found at Hadrian's Aquincum of the Roman governor's palace, which was uncovered and presented to wait.

Carrot farms were still there as late as 1960. In 1967, the current reinforced concrete bridge was built. In 1973, for the centennial of the Óbuda-Pest-Buda union, "May the 9th Park" was created, requiring the use of 18,000 m^{3} (640,000 cu ft) of soil. The park contained many playgrounds, which were burned down in 1999 and replaced in 2004. The six tennis courts are currently in a state of disrepair.

== Present ==
The island hosts the annual Sziget Festival, which has helped the island to achieve international fame. After the fall of the Communist government, there were no longer any organized camps for musicians to meet up and play; hence a music festival was proposed as a way to bridge this gap. The festival was started in 1993, originally called Diáksziget (Students' Island) and was organized by Károly Gerenday and Péter Müller Sziámi, enthusiastic music fans, in their spare time. It ran well over budget, and its losses were not repaid until 1997. From 1996 to 2001 it was sponsored by Pepsi and renamed Pepsi Sziget. It has been called Sziget Fesztivál ("island festival") since 2002.

== Construction project ==
Construction of a massive Ft 400 billion (€1.5 billion) hotel and recreation complex on the island was planned for completion in 2012. The complex was supposed to feature a conference center capable of hosting 3,500 people; three five-star hotels and four apartment hotels; a spacious, American-style casino offering many different kinds of games; and an entertainment complex, including a swimming pool. Ultimately the project failed in 2013, and the Hungarian government repurchased the land.
