= Mór Balázs =

Hungarian entrepreneur and engineer

Noble Mór Balázs de Verőce
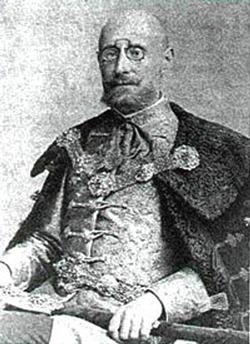
- Mór Balázs in Hungarian ceremonial (díszmagyar) attire, in the 1890s.
- Born: Mózes Kohn; 5 April 1849; Pest, Kingdom of Hungary
- Died: 1 August 1897 (aged 48); Remagen, German Empire
- Resting place: Kozma Street Cemetery
- Education: Royal Joseph Polytechnic
- Organization(s): Budapest Electric City Railway Corporation (Budapesti Villamos Városi Vasút; BVVV)
- Spouse: Malvina Deutsch
- Children: Vera, Pálma, Aurél, Károly
- Parent(s): Ármin Kohn, Róza Luria
- Engineering career
- Projects: First electric tram service in Budapest (1887); Millennium Underground (1896)

Mór Balázs de Verőce (Hungarian: verőcei Balázs Mór; 5 April 1849 – 1 August 1897) was a Hungarian entrepreneur and engineer. He pioneered the adoption of electric trams in Budapest and initiated the construction of the Budapest Millennium Underground Railway, the first electric underground urban railway on the European continent.

== Early life and education ==
Balázs was born in Pest to a middle class Hungarian Jewish family, the son of Ármin Kohn and Róza Luria. At the age of one, his mother married a wealthy privatier named Zsigmond Blasz, who raised him in the subsequent years. He used the surname Conn-Blasz until 1882, when he officially changed his name to Balázs.

After completing secondary school studies, he attended the Royal Joseph Polytechnic, the preceding institution of Budapest University of Technology and Economics. He travelled extensively in his youth, particularly to London, where he likely encountered modern transport innovations such as the first section of the London Underground, opened in 1863.

== Career and urban transport initiatives ==
=== Transportation in mid-19th century Buda and Pest ===
In the mid-19th century, the cities of Buda and Pest underwent a process of rapid urbanization, which gained momentum with the Austro-Hungarian Compromise of 1867 and the unification of the cities of Buda, Pest and Óbuda in 1873 to form Budapest. The city tripled its population compared to levels in the 1840s, which created new challenges in the area of public transportation.

Horse-drawn omnibuses have been in service since 1832. By the 1860s, 16 lines were served by over 200 cars, 60 percent of which connected Városliget with the city.

The first horsecar service started operating in Pest in 1866, and in 1868 on the Buda side. These were run by the Budapesti Közúti Vaspálya Társaság or BKVT (Budapest Street Railway Company), which held a monopoly over horse-drawn tracked transit in the city. The cars ran on standard gauge tracks and could accommodate up to 70 passengers. By 1870, the network extended to a combined length of 47 kilometers. While accessible and convenient, they could not solve all problems. Deputy Police Captain Károly Polgár articulated the difficulty in 1868:

Everyday experience proves that currently existing modes of transportation in our city cannot fulfill the demand by the general public. (...) Tracked horsecars are confined by natural limitations and are not suited for narrow streets in dense neighborhoods. (...) Carriages are only affordable for the wealthier classes. We currently have no mode of transportation that allows the general public to travel wherever they wish in a swift, cheap and safe way.

The horsecar network continued to expand, becoming the core of the city's transport system. While its tracks were also increasingly used by steam locomotives, especially for freight transport, horses dominated the cityscape. The necessary stables and granaries had a large urban footprint, and their upkeep imposed significant costs. The multitude of horses also presented a public health risk. As Budapest grew to become an international hub with modern industrial and residential districts, the need for rapid and reliable transportation at scale between distant areas of the city became a priority.

In the following years, the city's transport infrastructure was extended with more modern components, such as the Buda Funicular (1870) and the Svábhegy Cog-wheel railway (1874), both steam-powered. The city also adopted unified traffic rules and a master plan of a municipal transit system, originally envisioning steam-powered vehicles.

=== The first electric tramline in Budapest ===
In 1885, Balázs published a systematic plan in Hungarian and German, outlining a new tram network for the city. He proposed steam traction, except for a section on the Danube bank, where he suggested electric trams supplied by an overhead wire. The network consisted of five lines:

1. A connection between the city and Városliget on Podmaniczky utca (steam)
2. A line along Nagykörút from the Nyugati Railway Station to Boráros tér (steam)
3. A line along the Danube bank from the public warehouses (közraktárak), connecting to the Városliget line via Báthory utca (electric)
4. From Népszínház utca towards the new public cemetery to the east (steam)
5. From Egyetem tér to Orczy tér, along Stáció (today Baross) utca (steam).

The proposal gained favor with the Metropolitan Board of Public Works, which oversaw all major developments in Budapest. The company operating the horsecar network, BKVT, did not have priority rights for mechanized transport and could not compete with Balázs's proposal. The authorities also found the proposal compelling as BKVT was often deprioritizing lines due to costs, despite the public need. Balázs partnered with the firm Lindheim és Társa (Lindheim & Co.) which had experience in operating a steam tramline in Debrecen, and acquired Siemens and Halske as a supplier for the electrical equipment.

The concept changed in the following months, largely due to the proliferation of electric trams throughout Europe, and the board's preliminary approval in the next year allowed for "any form of applicable traction", instead of steam specifically, for the line along Stáció utca.

During consultations, city officials expressed their disdain for the overhead wires, citing their unappealing visual impact on the city. While electric tram services already existed throughout Europe, such as the Gross-Lichterfelde Tramway near Berlin, these ran outside of densely populated areas. The officials also had concerns on the safety of underground conduits as an alternative.

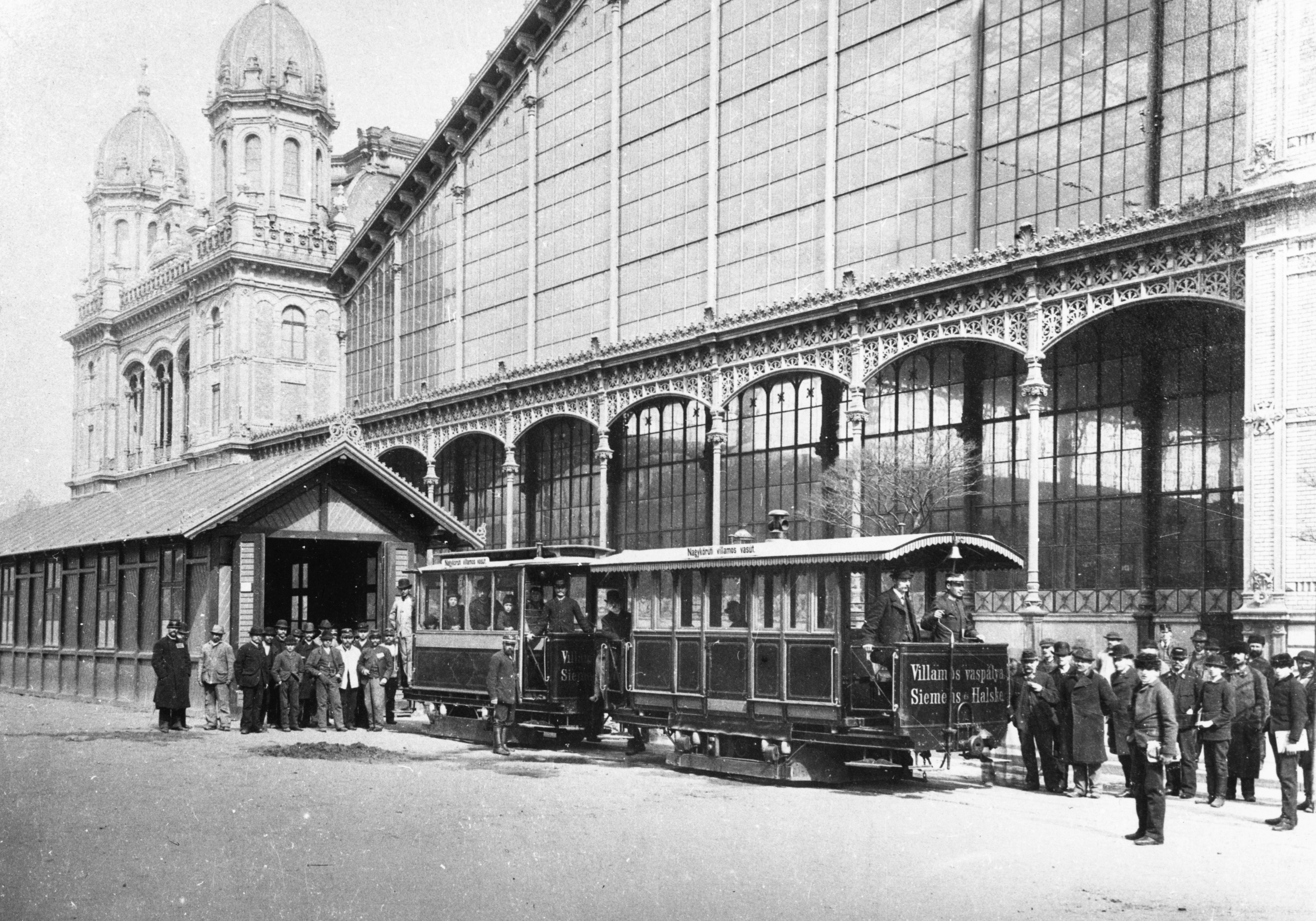
The narrow gauge electric tramline in front of Nyugati Railway Station, built in 1887 as a proof of concept.

To reach a compromise, Balázs pushed for testing the idea, which met with sympathy from Minister of Transportation Gábor Baross. Constructed within a few weeks, the experimental tramline began operation along the Nagykörút (Grand Boulevard) in Budapest on 28 November 1887.

The service ran on 1000 mm narrow gauge tracks using underground conduit current collection, between Nyugati Railway Station and Király utca. Its maximum allowed speed was 10 km/h, and relied on a power supply housed next to the railway station. The line consisted of four stops and was served by three green cars, two of which were equipped with an engine. After its opening, the operation became the responsibility of Siemens & Halske, within a joint venture that included Balázs and Lindheim & Co. Europe's first inner city electric tram service quickly became popular with the locals.

=== The first standard gauge lines and the creation of BVVV ===
The success convinced the municipality to allow the construction of the first of the originally proposed lines with electric vehicles. The line from Egyetem tér to Orczy tér, along Stáció utca was built with a standard gauge track and a tram depot located at Orczy tér. It used the same conduit current collection system as the test line, designed by Siemens & Halske, and was opened on 30 July 1889. The second line in Podmaniczky utca opened shortly afterwards, on 10 September of the same year.

The new lines were served by a central generating station housing steam turbines in Kertész utca, supplying 117 kW of power at 300 V direct current. The specific schema of the underground current conduit became known internationally as the 'Budapest system', as it was first used in the city. It was cited in a 1904 discussion by the Institution of Civil Engineers as an early example of the side-slot conduit system, recognized alongside systems in Paris and Vienna.

Underground conduits existed in various forms by the end of the 1880s, and often featured a central third rail. In Budapest, the conductor was hidden beneath one of the rails, within an understructure that formed a channel and supported the surface rail. Drainage connections to the sewage system prevented the accumulation of water, but the slot was prone to collecting dirt and debris, and required regular cleaning and maintenance (usually during night hours).

One drawback of the arrangement was the fact that the current collector could only be retrieved through special openings built in the track, but not over regular sections. This had two important consequences: a broken collector could shut down traffic for hours; and combining with overhead wires later required rebuilding the tracks themselves. Siemens & Halske subsequently addressed this problem and created the 'Improved Budapest' system: this allowed the retrieval of the collector anywhere on the tracks. A slightly modified form of this arrangement was also deployed in Berlin.

The construction of the remaining lines from the original plan were also approved. The line along Nagykörút was built in several sections between 1890 and 1892. In 1891, the Anglo-Hungarian Bank purchased all operators and merged them in a single company, Budapesti Villamos Városi Vasút Részvénytársaság, or BVVV Rt. (Budapest Electric City Railway Corporation), and appointed Balázs as its first general manager, and later chairman.

By October 1893, BVVV also constructed the line between Népszínház utca and the New Public Cemetery. Since it mostly ran in the outskirts of the city, it was built without electrification, but shortly afterward became the first in Budapest to use an overhead wire. Electric trams proved so successful that city authorities decided to completely retire horsecars, although this wasn't fully implemented until well into the 20th century. By this time, BVVV acquired unique operational expertise, and was entrusted with the electrification of the BKVT (and other) lines. Due to costs, reliability and increased public acceptance, these lines received overhead wires.

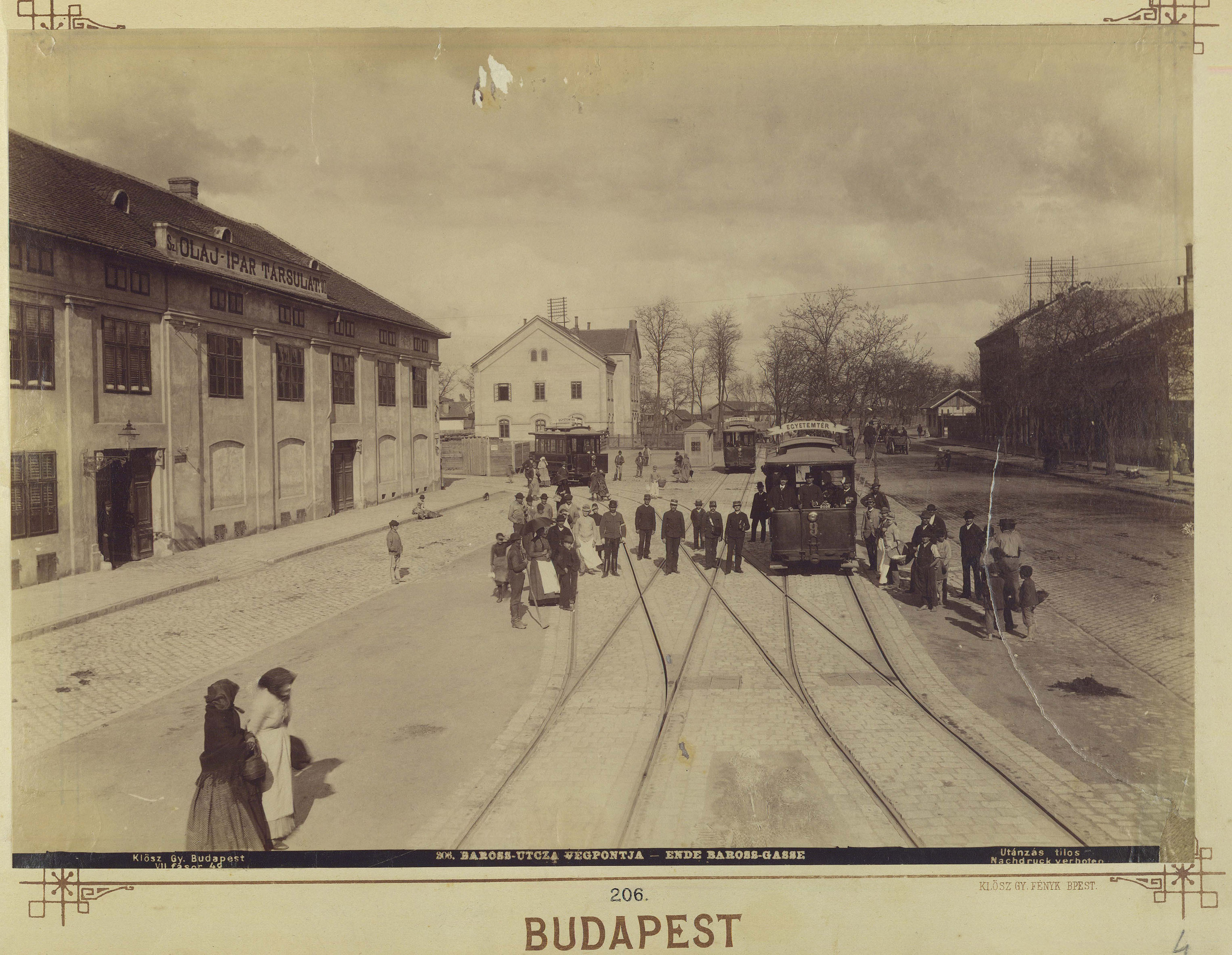
Terminus of the first standard gauge line at Orczy tér

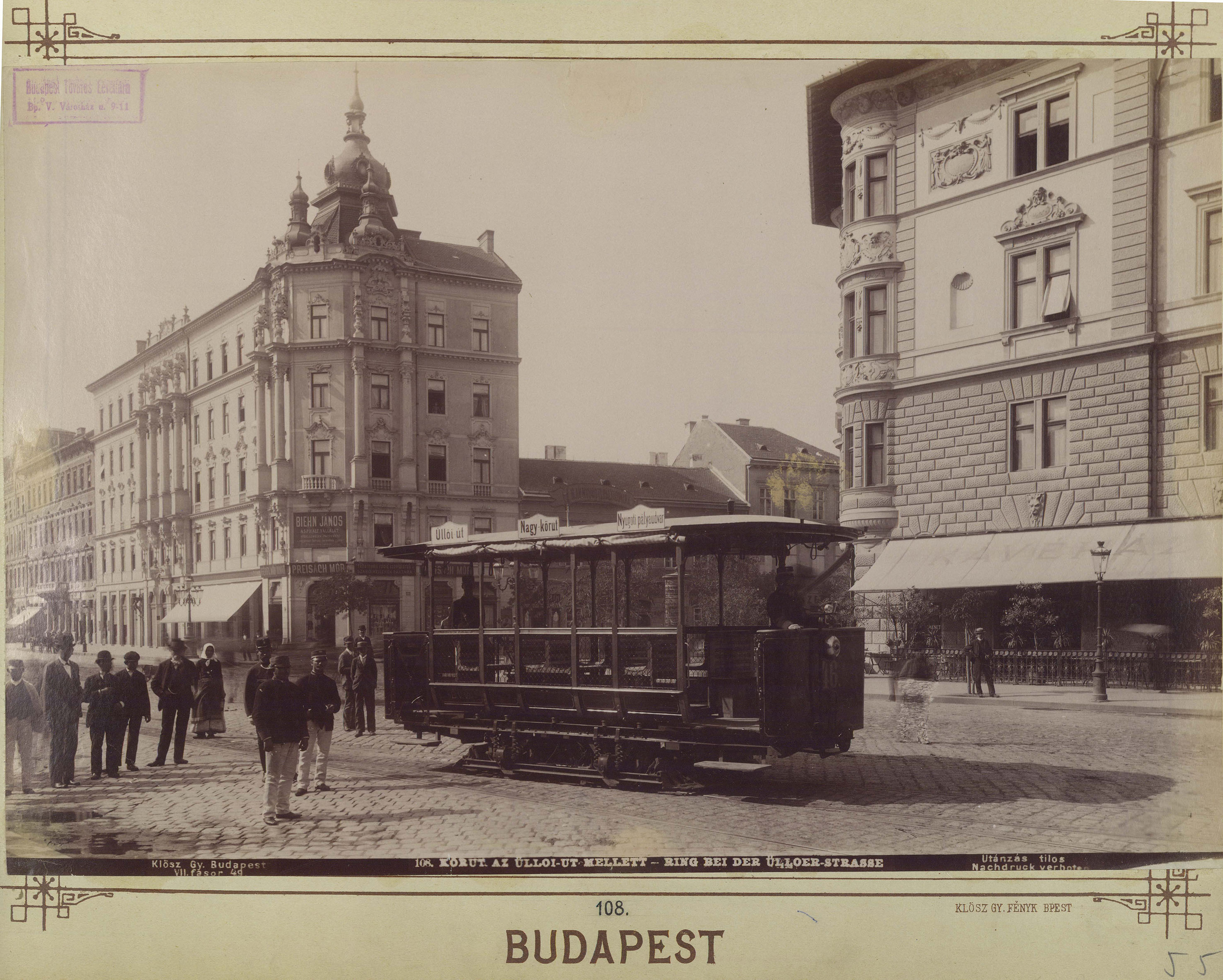
BVVV tram on Nagykörút, 1890s

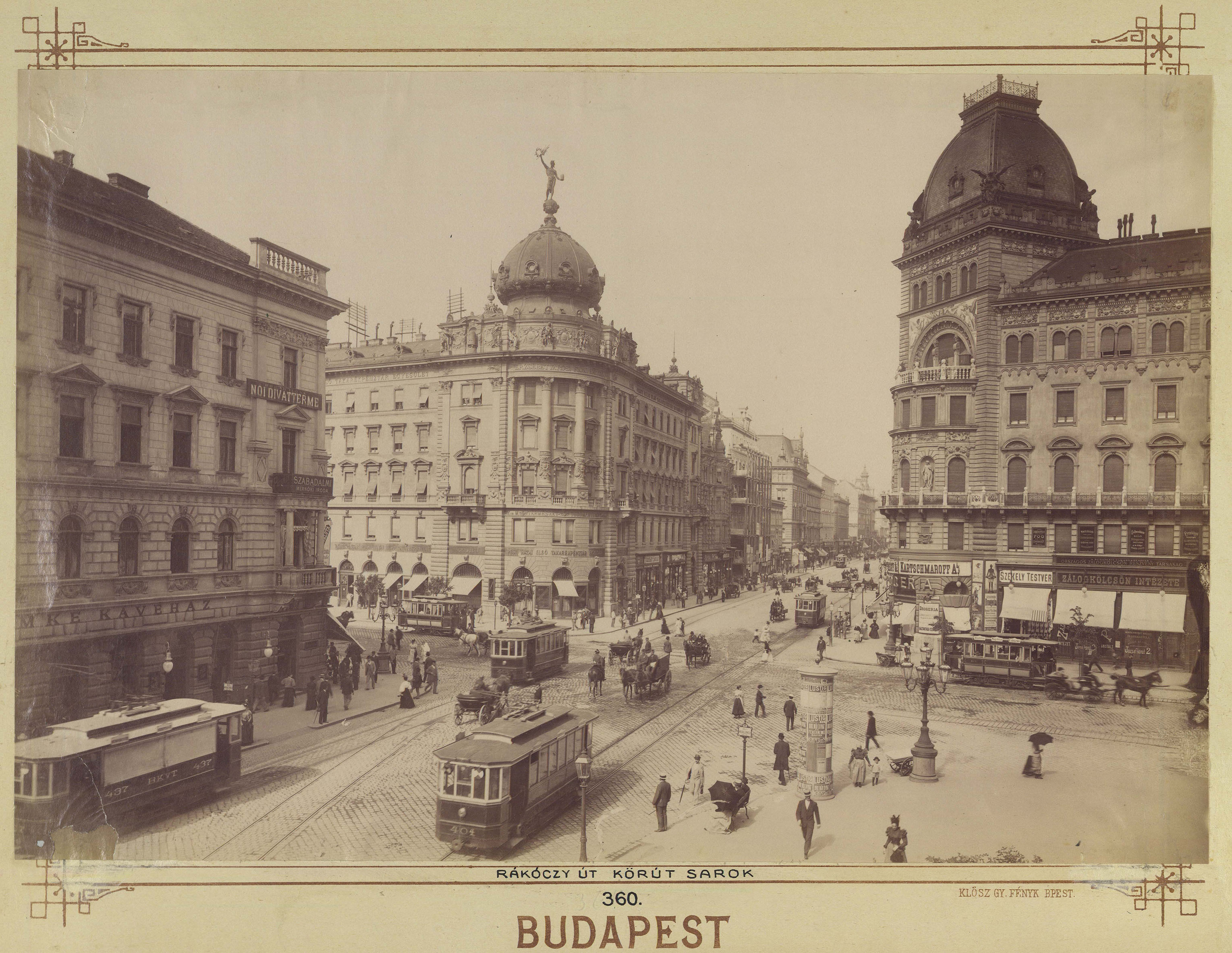
Corner of Nagykörút and Rákóczi út. In the front, BKVT trams feature bow collectors, while BVVV ones use an underground conduit

=== The first underground in Budapest ===
The success of the modern tram system inspired new plans for the city. By the 1890s, the meticulously designed Sugár út (today Andrássy út) became a main artery connecting the city center with Városliget. Since it was always intended as an elegant boulevard, the municipal board was reluctant to allow any form of tracked transportation on it. However, the upcoming Millennial Exhibition, a grand event celebrating the thousand years of Hungarian statehood scheduled for 1896, required a better connection between the two locations.

Balázs reached out to BVVV's competitor, BKVT to create a joint bid for a tramline along the avenue. While this plan was declined by city planners in line with prior expectations, the two companies also agreed secretly to propose the ambitious idea of an underground rail line as an alternative. The city eventually gave its approval for the expensive project with the condition that the line must be opened before the exhibition.

The tight deadline allowed 21 months for completion. The line was opened on schedule, on 2 May 1896. It was the first electric urban underground railway line in continental Europe, and the first one in the world designed for electric traction from its conception.

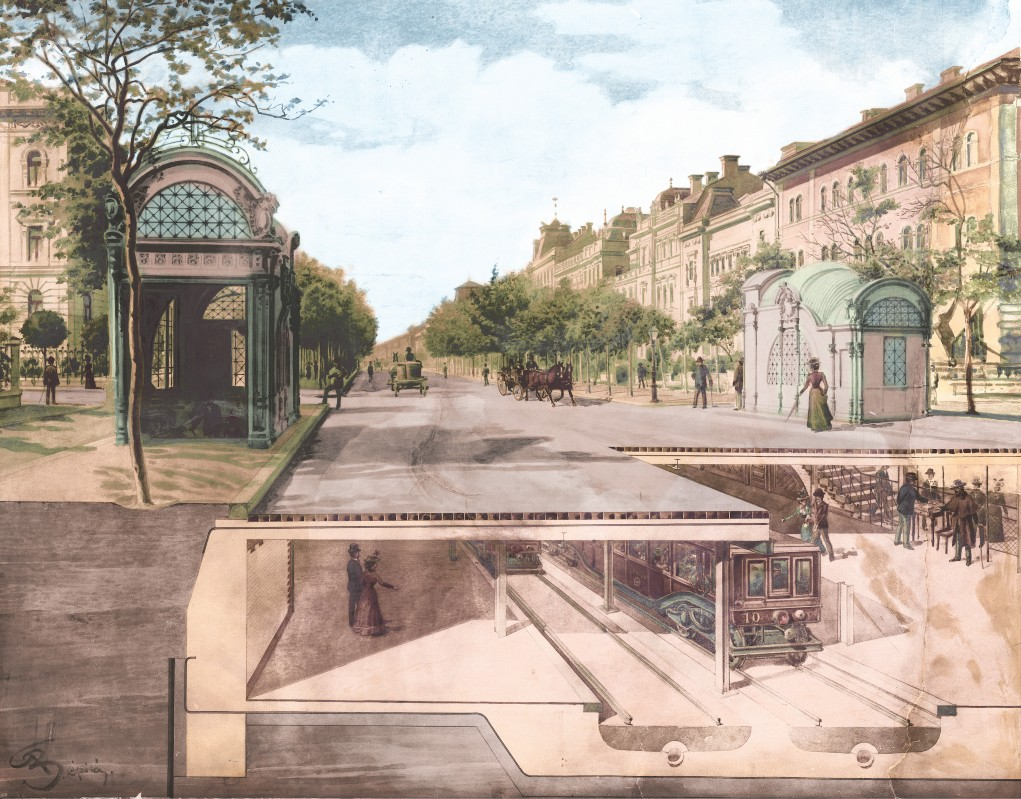
Cross-section illustration

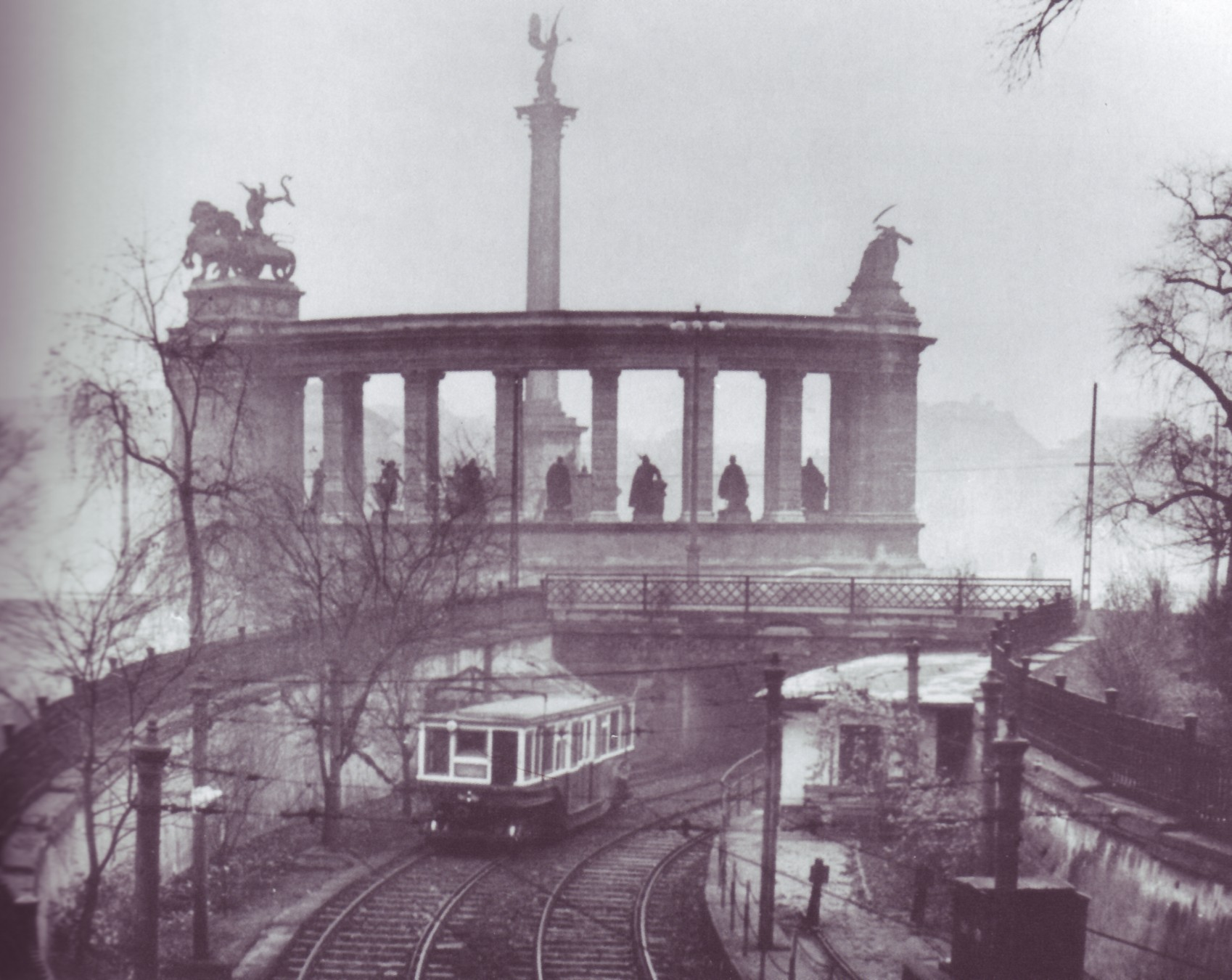
The tunnel entrance near Heroes' Square

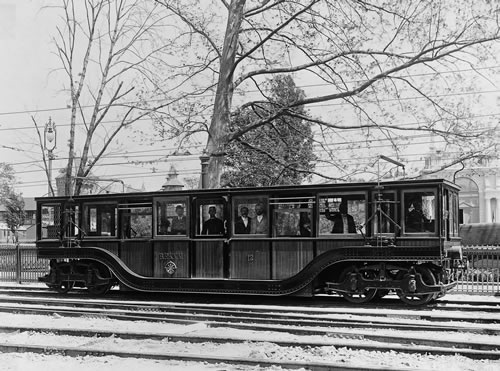
Original rolling stock

In March 1897, Balázs published a plan that proposed the construction of further underground lines. He also argued against the adoption of elevated rail systems (which was advocated by BKVT), citing their environmental impact, based on experience in the USA.

== Public service and recognition ==
An active participant in local politics and social life, Balázs was a member of Budapest's general assembly as deputy of district VII in 1891, and was serving on the Committee of Public Construction (Középítésügyi Bizottmány). He supported the Jewish community of Budapest in acquiring a plot of land to construct a synagogue and a school, and expanding the community's hospital in Szabolcs utca. He lobbied for the city's monetary support for pensioners and for founding a public library.

In recognition of his achievements, Balázs was ennobled in 1896, the year of Hungary's Millennium celebrations. His coat of arms included the unusual heraldic motifs of an iron wheel, a railway and lightning bolts — symbols of his contribution to modern transport — with the Latin motto Per ardua gradior (‘I advance through effort’).

== Death and burial ==
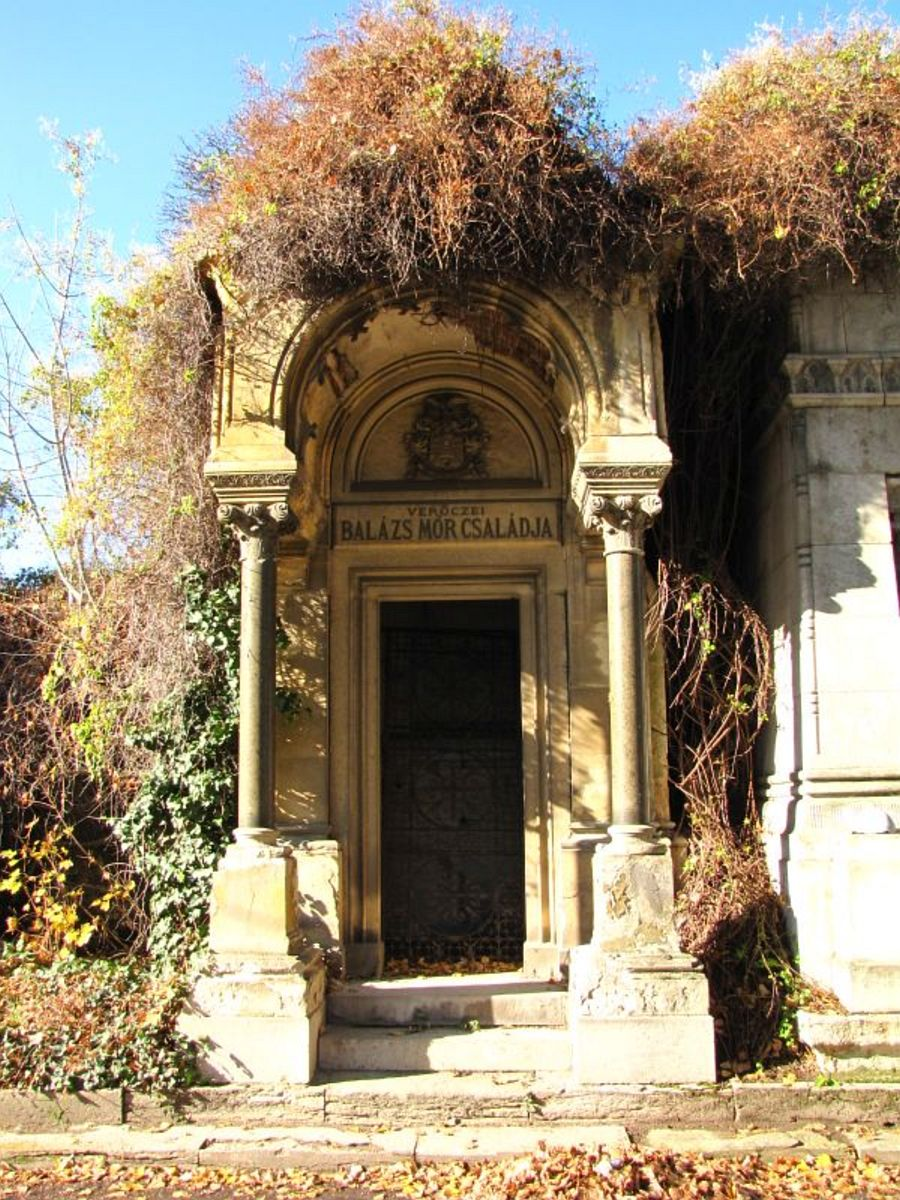
Mór Balázs's mausoleum in the Kozma Street Cemetery.

Due to his declining health, he stated his last will and testament in 1896. He died in the following year, on 10 August 1897 after spa treatment in Bad Neuenahr-Ahrweiler, while traveling in the city of Remagen. He was laid to rest in the Kozma Street Jewish Cemetery, a site associated with many of Hungary's notable Jewish figures.

== Legacy and impact on Budapest ==
Balázs's work laid the foundation for Budapest's integrated public transport network. His early initiatives in tram electrification and underground railway construction shaped the city's infrastructure well into the 20th century.

The Millennium Underground Railway, now part of the Budapest Metro, remains both a functioning transport line and a UNESCO World Heritage Site.

Today's tram lines 4 and 6 along Nagykörút are the busiest in the world in terms of number of passengers. Tram line 2 along the Danube on the Pest side follows the original plans by Balázs, including an iron viaduct, and is a popular tourist attraction.

BKV Zrt., Budapest's public transport operator, recognizes outstanding contributions in the field with the Mór Balázs Prize. In 2014, the General Assembly of Budapest named a strategic plan for the city's public transport development in his honor.
