= Hungary boulevard =

Road in Budapest, Hungary

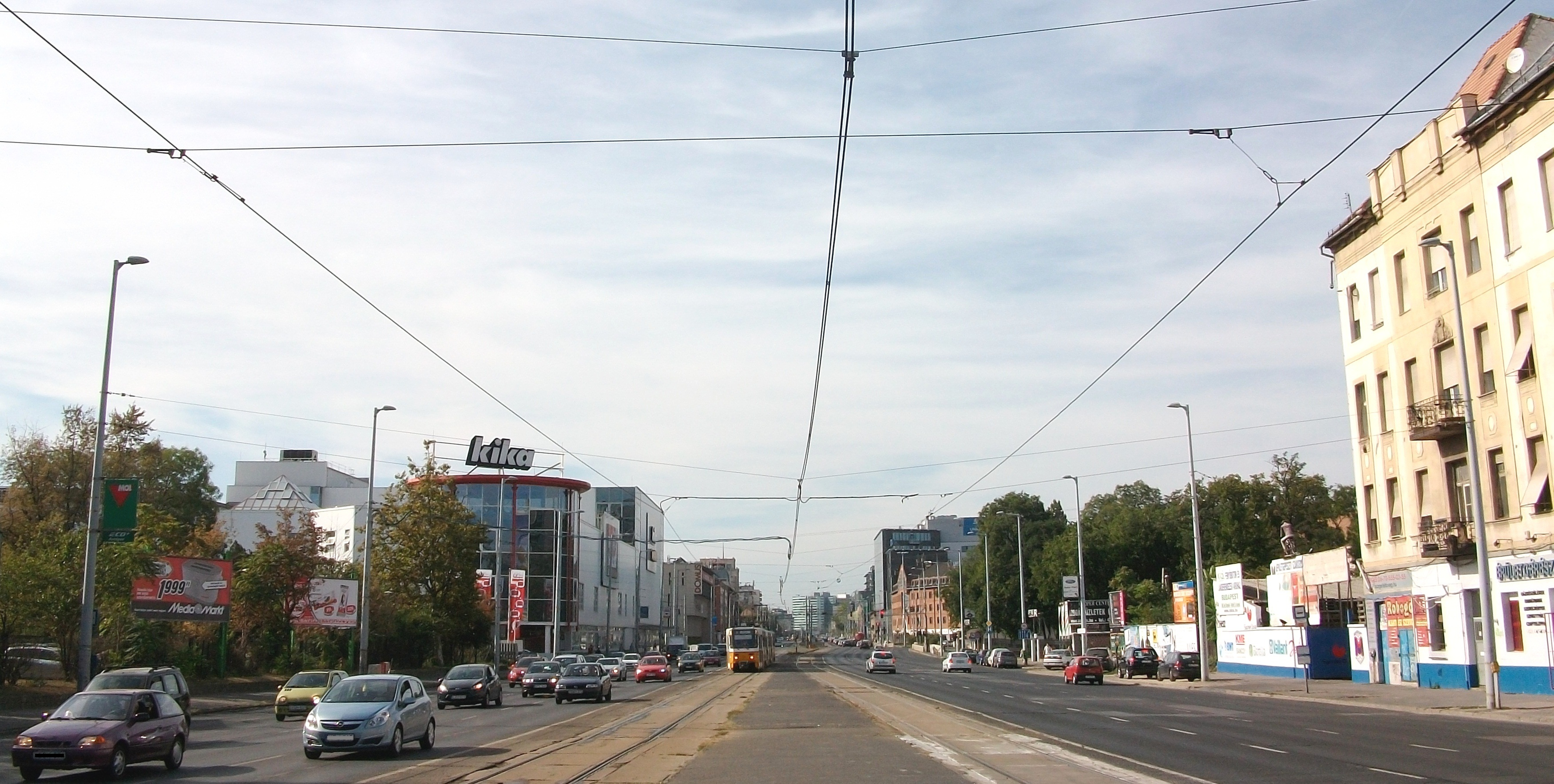
Róbert Károly Boulevard

Hungária körgyűrű (lit. Hungary beltway or Hungary boulevard) is the longest and busiest boulevard, also the widest city street in Budapest, Hungary. It is 13 km long and has 6–10 traffic lanes with a rapid tram line on the median of the boulevard. It consists of three parts: Róbert Károly körút, Hungária körút and Könyves Kálmán körút.

== Location ==
It starts by the Pester side of Árpád Bridge and crosses Váci út, Lehel út, M3 motorway, Thököly út, Kerepesi út, Kőbányai út, Üllői út, Gyáli út (M5 motorway) and Soroksári út. Róbert Károly körút part lies in Angyalföld (13th district), Hungária körút (bordering the Városliget, where it meets Ajtósi Dürer sor) in Zugló (14th district), Kőbánya (10th district) and Józsefváros (8th district), Könyves Kálmán körút in Kőbánya, Józsefváros and Ferencváros (9th district).

== History ==
The construction started in 1980, the first part was completed in 1984 with the new Árpád Bridge (2×3 traffic lanes and 2 tram tracks). To make way for the urban highway, the majority of the small houses on the planned route were demolished. The last section was finished in 2000, Rákóczi Bridge was built in 1995. Nowadays the boulevard doesn't have a uniform facade: there are socialist block of flats and modern high-rise office buildings along Hungária körgyűrű.

== Notable points ==
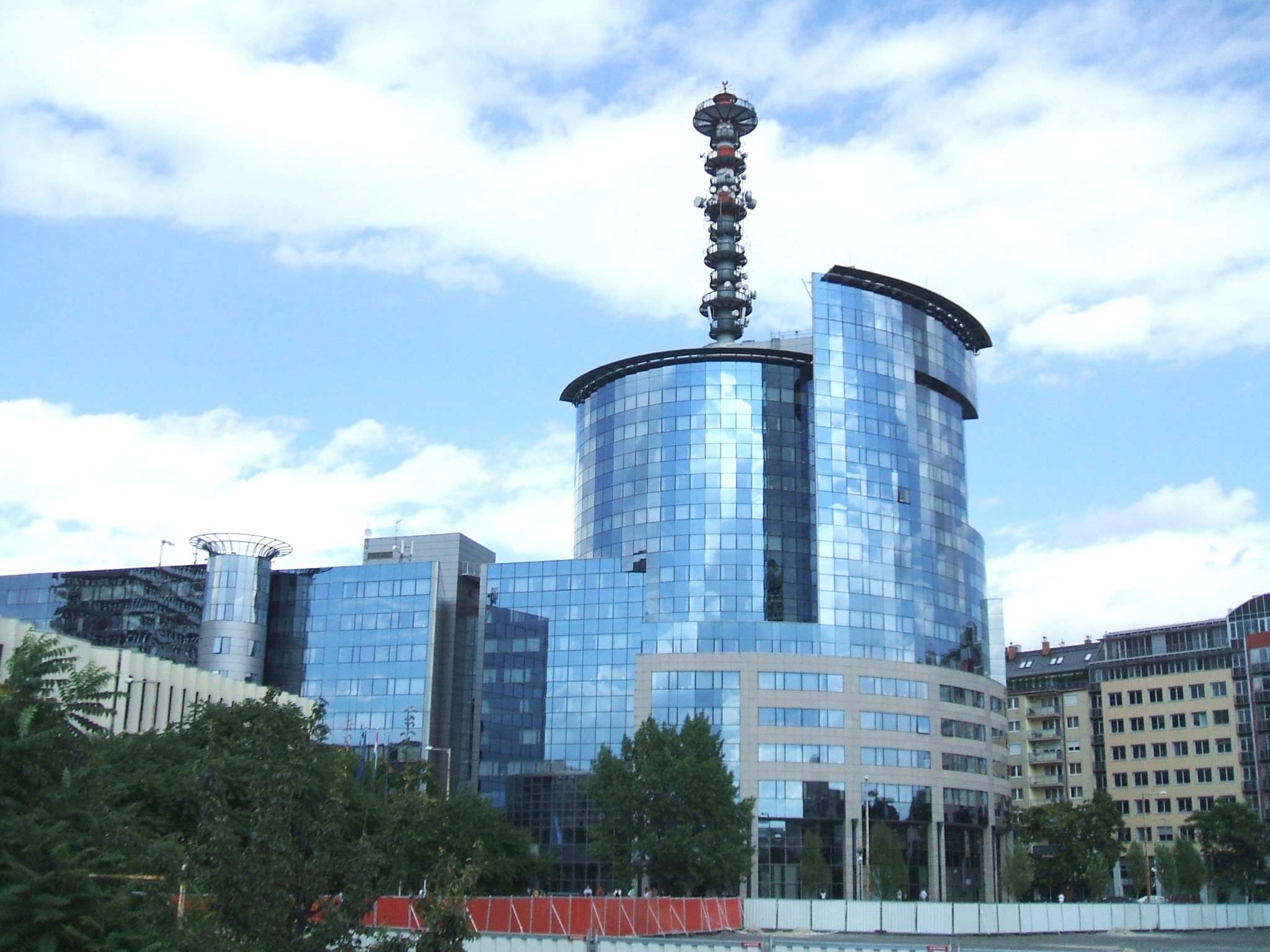
National Police HQ

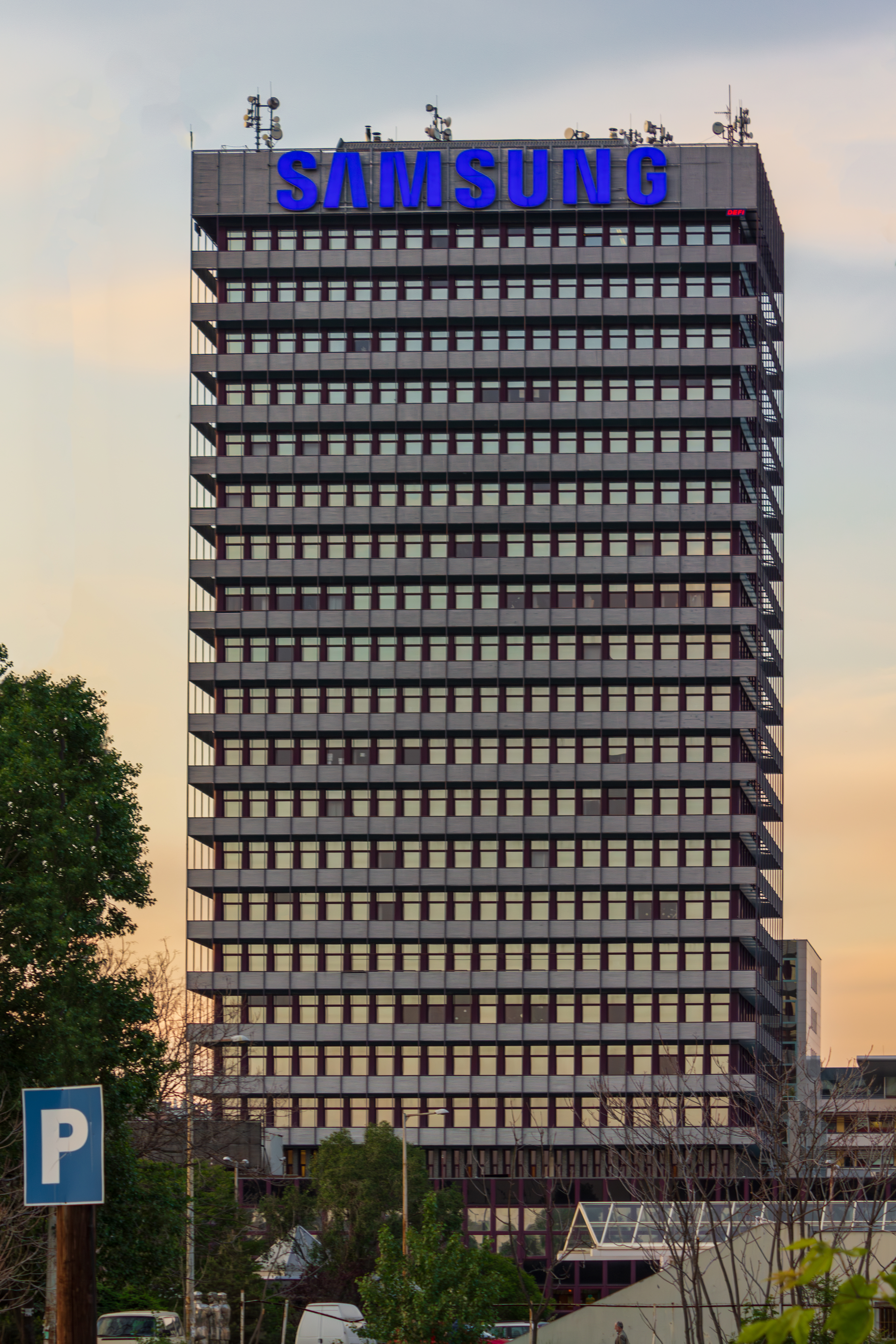
National Pension Insurance

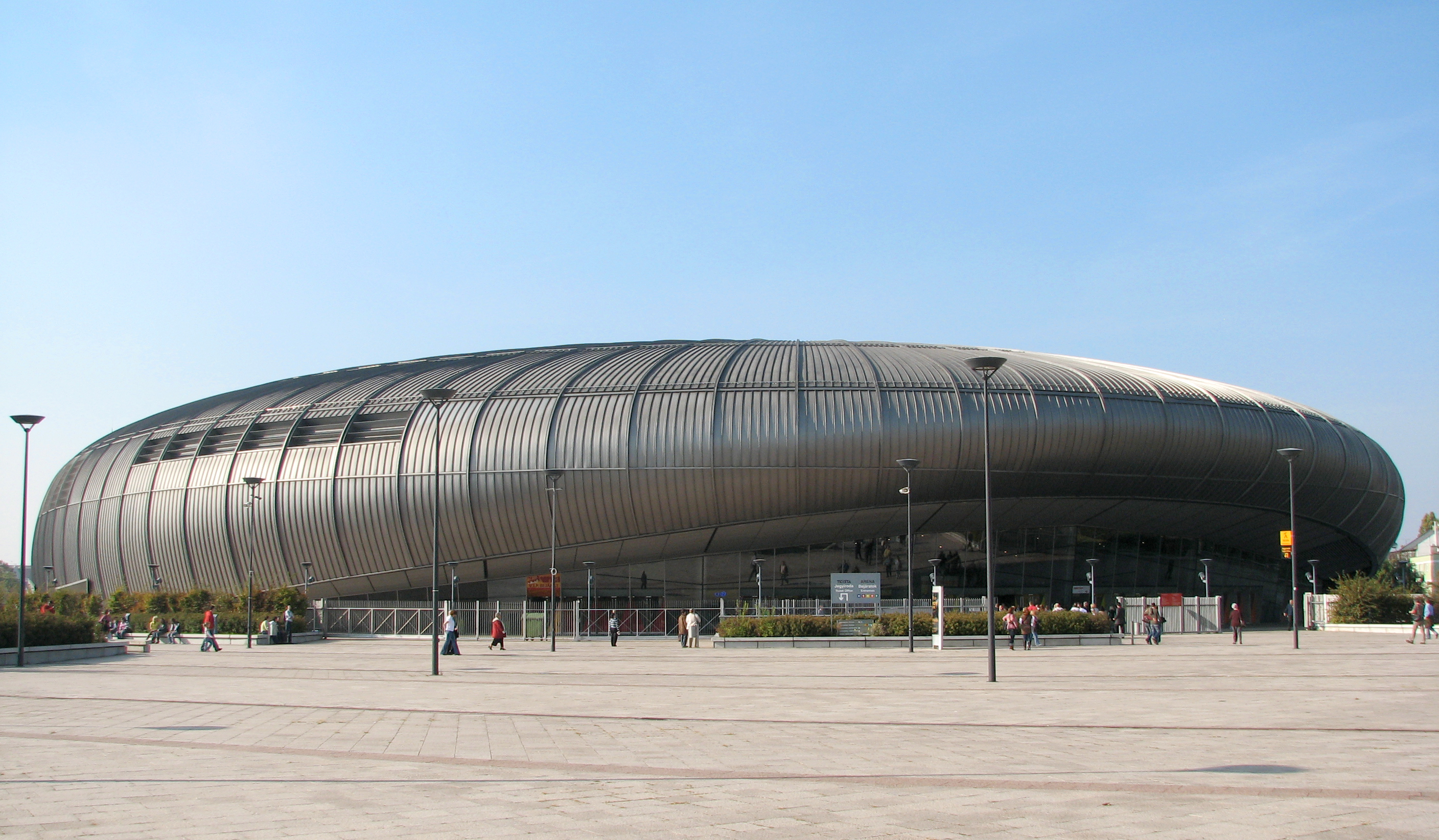
László Papp Budapest Sports Arena

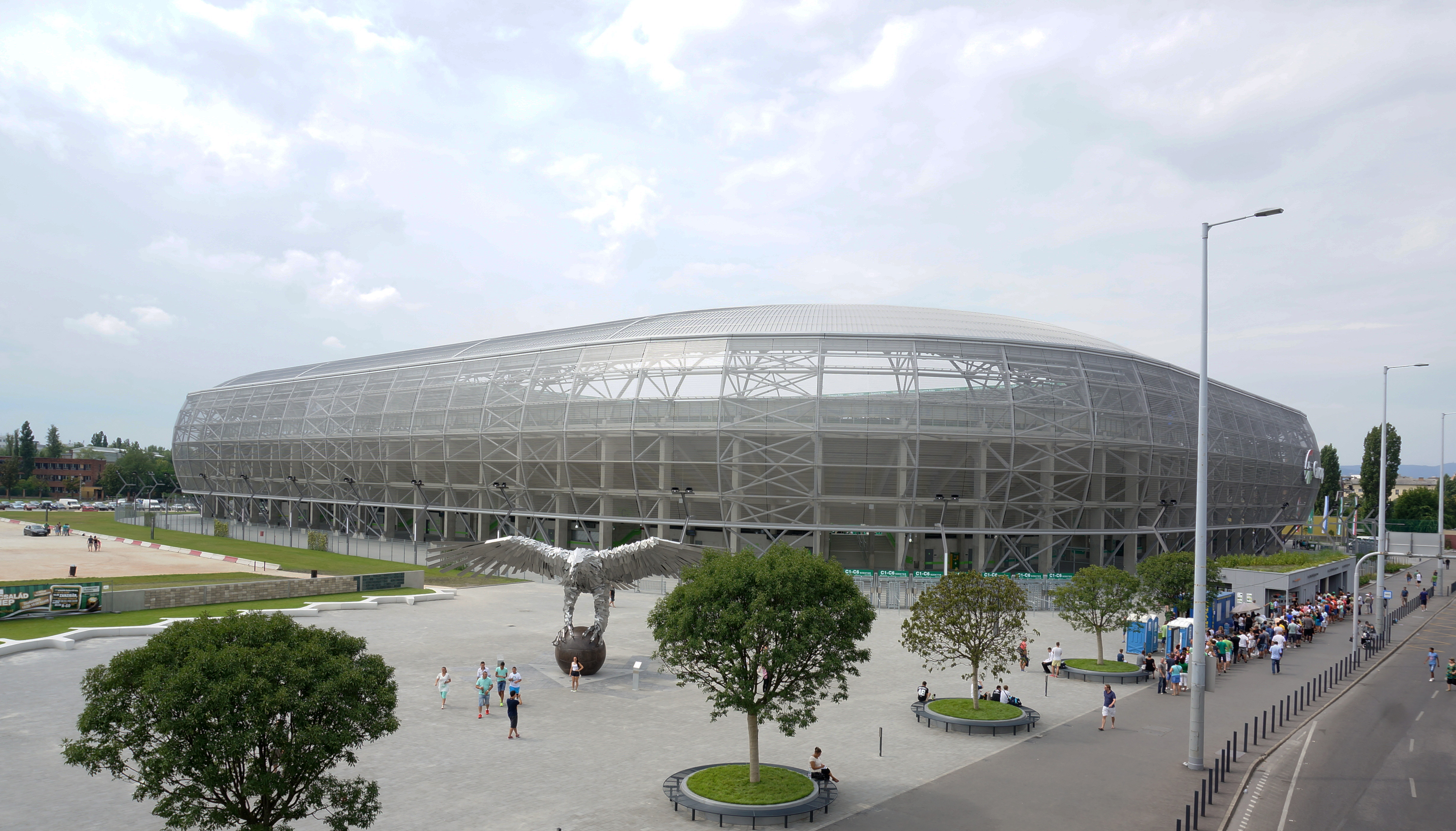
Groupama Arena

- Dagály Bath (Dagály fürdő)
- Europe Tower (Erste Bank Hungary Zrt. HQ)
- Duna Tower (High-rise office building)
- Árpád Bridge Bus Station (Árpád híd buszpályaudvar, suburban bus station) – Árpád híd (Budapest Metro)
- Attila József Theatre (József Attila Színház)
- National Police HQ - Metropolitan Police HQ - Pest County Police HQ (Országos Rendőrfőkapitányság, Budapesti Rendőrfőkapitányság, Pest Megyei Rendőrfőkapitányság)
- Hungarian State Treasury (Magyar Államkincstár)
- National Pension Insurance (Országos Nyugdíjbiztosítási Főigazgatóság)
- National Health Insurance (Országos Egészségbiztosítási Pénztár)
- State Medical Center - Central Hospital of the Hungarian Defence Force (Állami Egészségügyi Központ - Magyar Honvédség Központi Kórháza)
- Post Insurer HQ (Posta Biztosító, insurer division of the state-owned Magyar Posta)
- Nyírő Gyula Hospital (Nyírő Gyula Kórház)
- City Park (Városliget)
- Groupama Guarantee Insurer HQ (Gropama Garancia Biztosító Zrt.)
- State Institution of Blind people (Vakok Állami Intézete)
- László Papp Budapest Sports Arena (Papp László Budapest Sportaréna)
- Puskás Ferenc Stadium (Puskás Ferenc Stadion)
- Stadion Bus Terminal (Stadion autóbusz-pályaudvar, inter-city bus terminal) – Puskás Ferenc Stadion (Budapest Metro)
- Zrínyi Miklós National Defence University (Zrínyi Miklós Nemzetvédelmi Egyetem, the national military academy of Hungary)
- Hidegkuti Nándor Stadium (Hidegkuti Nándor Stadion)
- MÁV - Northern Workshop (MÁV - Északi Járműjavító, vehicle repair workshop of the Hungarian State Railways)
- Ganz Works (Ganz Művek)
- People's Park (Népliget)
- Hungarian State Railways HQ (Magyar Államvasutak Zrt. székháza)
- Népliget Bus Terminal (Népliget autóbusz-pályaudvar, the central international and inter-city bus terminal of Budapest) – Népliget (Budapest Metro)
- Groupama Arena
- Szent László Hospital (Szent László Kórház)
- Ferencváros Railway Station (Ferencváros pályaudvar, the largest freight station in Central Europe)
- Lurdy-ház (mall)
- Millennium City Center (Millenniumi Városközpont, cultural quarter built to the memory of the 1000-year anniversary of the Hungarian statehood)
- Palace of Arts (Művészetek Palotája)
- Hungarian National Theater (Nemzeti Színház)

== Sources ==
- Budapest City Atlas, Dimap-Szarvas, Budapest, 2011, ISBN 978-963-03-9124-5
- Preisich Gábor: Budapest városépítésének története, Műszaki Könyvkiadó, Budapest, 1998, ISBN 963-16-1467-0
- The strangest street in Budapest (with pictures, in Hungarian)
