= Árpád Bridge =

Bridge in Budapest, Hungary

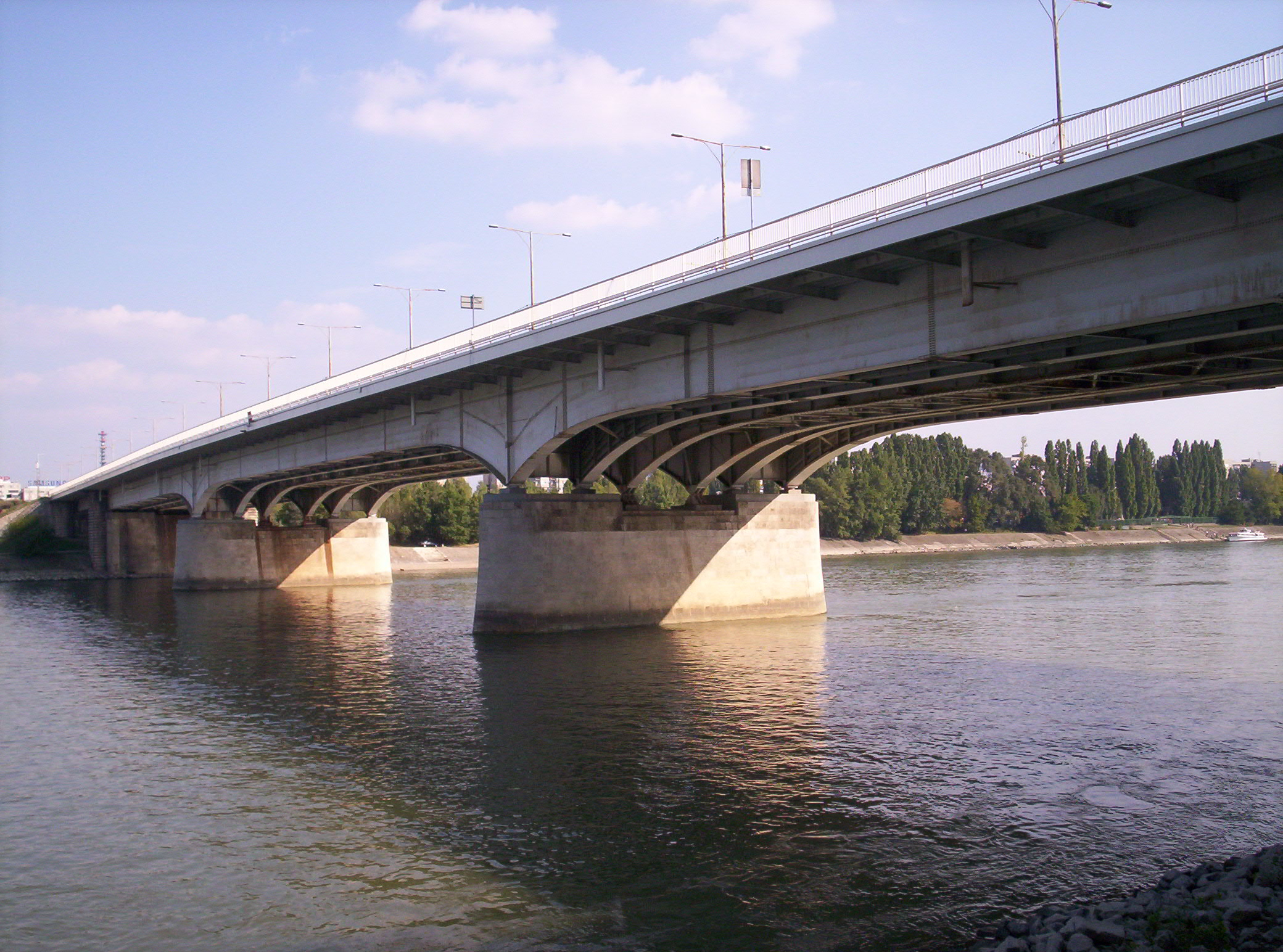
- Coordinates: 47°32′15″N 19°03′15″E
- Carries: 2×3 roads+tram
- Crosses: Danube River
- Locale: Budapest
- Official name: Árpád híd
- Named for: Árpád

Characteristics
- Design: Beam bridge
- Total length: 981 meters (3,219 ft)
- Width: 27.6 meters (91 m)
- Longest span: 457.2 meters (1,500 ft)

History
- Opened: November 7, 1950

Statistics
- Daily traffic: 150,000

Location
- Interactive map of Árpád Bridge

Árpád Bridge or Árpád híd (Hungarian pronunciation: [ˈaːrpaːd ˈhiːd]) is a bridge in Budapest, Hungary, connecting northern Buda (Óbuda) and Pest across the Danube.

Until the inauguration of Megyeri Bridge in 2008, it was the longest bridge in Hungary, spanning about 2 km (1.24 mi) with the sections leading up to the bridge, and 928 m (0.58 mi) without them. It is 35.3 m (116 ft) wide with pedestrian and bicycle paths and a tramline.

At its Óbuda end is Flórián tér, Szentlélek tér (near the Main Square of Óbuda, the Vasarely and Kassák Museums).

Margaret Island is connected to Árpád Bridge through an embranchment approximately in the middle of the bridge, and crosses the Southern tip of Óbuda Island as well, although there is no road, pedestrian or any other connection whatsoever between the two. (See Sziget Festival)

At the Pest end, the adjoining Line 3 (North-South) metro station was called "Árpád híd" until 31 January 2020.

== Construction and expansion ==
=== From the History ===
In earlier times there was a bridge in the same area established by the Romans, it was connecting a fort and the old Roman settlement of Aquincum. There was a plan at the beginning of the 19th century, to create a new bridge named Árpád, however the tender was announced only in 1929.

=== The original bridge ===
Construction began in 1939 by the plans of János Kossalka. It was planned to be named "Árpád Bridge" after Grand Prince Árpád, the second Grand Prince of the Magyars.

Due to World War II, the bridge was finished only after the war in 1950. Because of the communist regime then ruling Hungary, the bridge was opened as Stalin Bridge (Hungarian: Sztálin híd). The final construction works were directed by Károly Széchy and Pál Sávoly.

Although the pillars were built in their current dimensions, the original bridge contained only a 2x1 lane road, railroad tracks (for trams, but until the reconstruction of the Northern Rail Bridge the tracks were also used by cargo trains as well) with pedestrian paths. This bridge was 13 m (42.65 ft) wide, 11 meters (36 ft) of this was the road and the tracks, and an additional 1 m (3.28 ft) wide pedestrian path were on each sides. Today the tram tracks are where the original bridge was situated.

The name was changed back to Árpád Bridge in 1958.

=== Expansion ===
Between 1980 and 1984, by extensive reconstruction and expansion works, two more lanes were added for cars, the pedestrian pathways were widened, the tram track was modernized and overpasses were built for the intersections at both Eastern (Pest) and Western (Buda/Óbuda) ends of Árpád Bridge.

This was planned and executed in connection with the expansion of the adjacent Róbert Károly körút (further sections also called Hungária körút and Könyves Kálmán körút as well) to 2×3 lanes and double tramway tracks . The project was called Hungária körgyűrű (English: Hungária Beltway), although the last third of the belt (Könyves Kálmán körút) was finished only around the millennium, years after the completion of Lágymányosi Bridge at the other end of the planned beltway.

== See also ==
- Bridges of Budapest
- List of crossings of the Danube River
