= GAT =

Gat or GAT may refer to:

== Places ==
- Gat, Iran, a village in Khuzestan Province, Iran
- Gat, Israel, a kibbutz in Israel
- Gat Rimon, a moshav in Israel
- Gát utca, a street in Ferencváros, Budapest, Hungary
- Gath (city), or Gat, an ancient Philistine city
- Fisherman's Gat, a channel in the Thames Estuary
- Kiryat Gat, a city in Israel
- Veerse Gat, a sea channel in Zeeland, Netherlands
- Hat, Azerbaijan, or Gat
- Gat, Croatia, a village near Belišće

== People ==
- Gat Stires (1849–1933), a Major League Baseball right fielder
- Gat (surname)

== Arts and Culture ==
- Gat (hat), a traditional Korean hat
- Gat (music), a Hindustani classical composition
- GAT (group), a Filipino pop boy band
- Johnny Gat, a character from the Saints Row video game series
- Gat (title), a pre-colonial Filipino honorific

== Education ==
- General Achievement Test, a standardized school test in Victoria, Australia
- Graduate Assessment Test, for university programs in Pakistan
- Global Academy of Technology, Bangalore, India

== Science and Technology ==
=== Biology/Chemistry ===
- GABA transporter (e.g., GAT1), a protein
- C7.GAT protein, a synthetic antibody
- Glycine N-phenylacetyltransferase, an enzyme
- Galactoside acetyltransferase, an enzyme
- Aspartic acid (codon: GAT), an amino acid
- Khat (or gat), a stimulant plant

=== Engineering ===
- Gat air pistol, a British airgun (1930s–1990s)
- Gat, slang for a firearm

=== Computer Science ===
- Generic Associated Types, a feature of the Rust programming language

== Geography ==
- Gat (landform), a strait eroded by currents

== Language ==
- Kenati language (ISO 639-3 code: gat)

== See also ==
- GATT
