= T'anggŏn =

Korean traditional hat for men

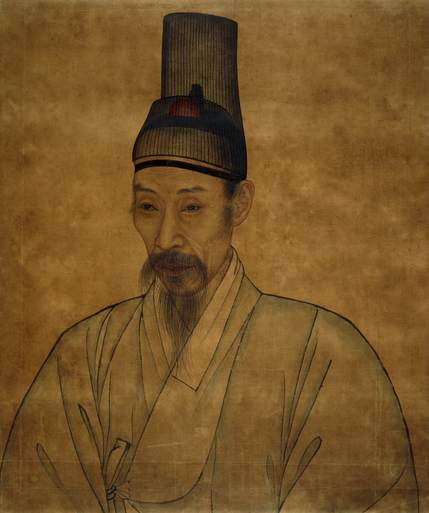
- T'anggŏn worn by a Joseon-era scholar

Korean name
- Hangul: 탕건
- Hanja: 宕巾
- RR: tanggeon
- MR: t'anggŏn

T'anggŏn (Korean: 탕건) is a type of Korean traditional headgear worn by men, which is put under a gat (formal hat), and worn over their topknot (sangtu). It is usually made of dyed horsehair or cow hair. Artisans who specialize in making t'anggŏn are called t'anggŏnjang.

== Gallery ==
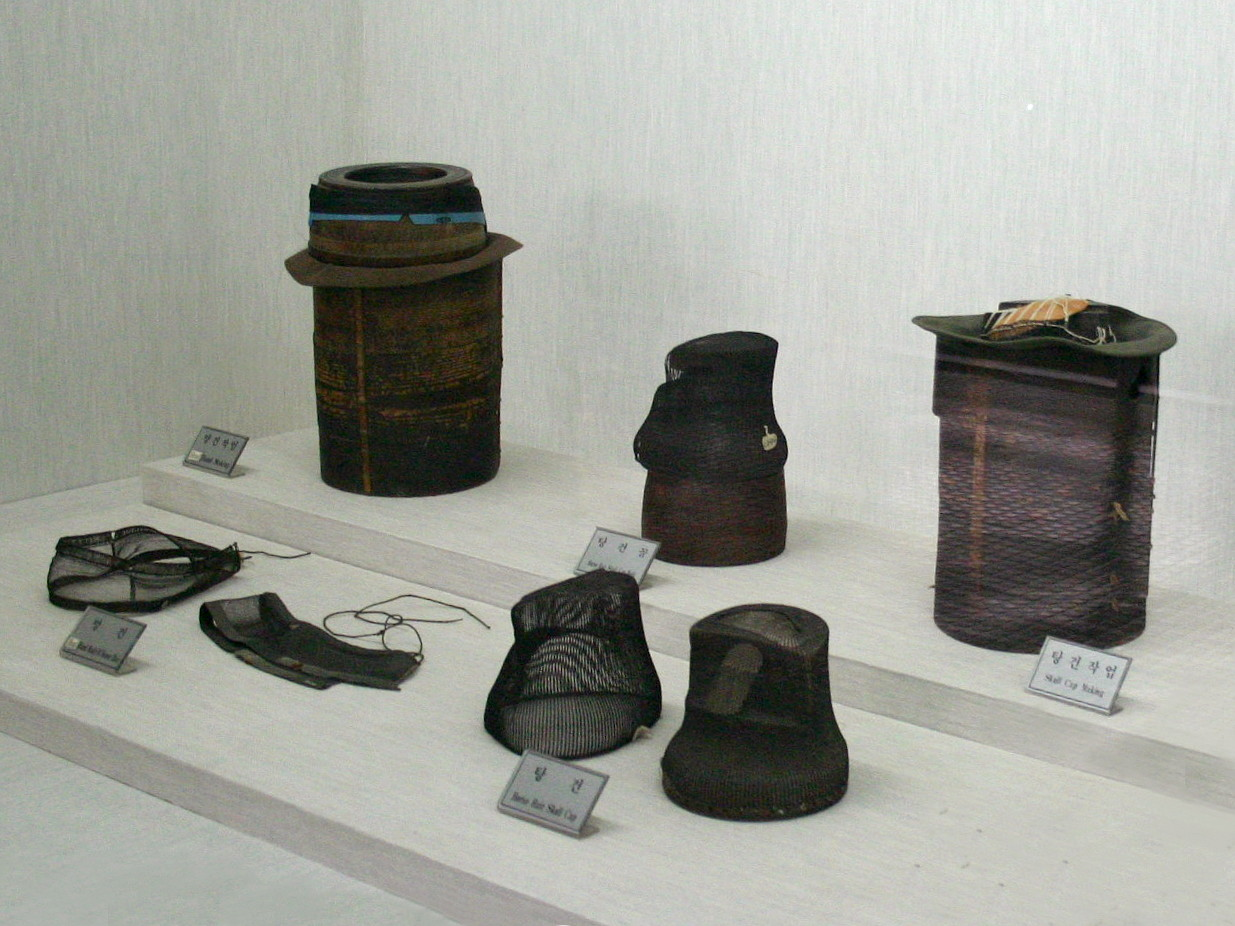

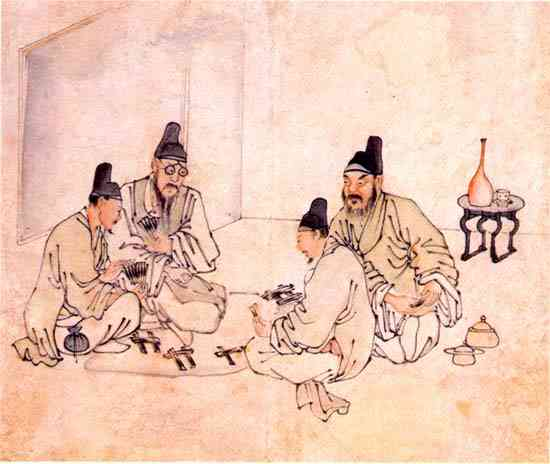

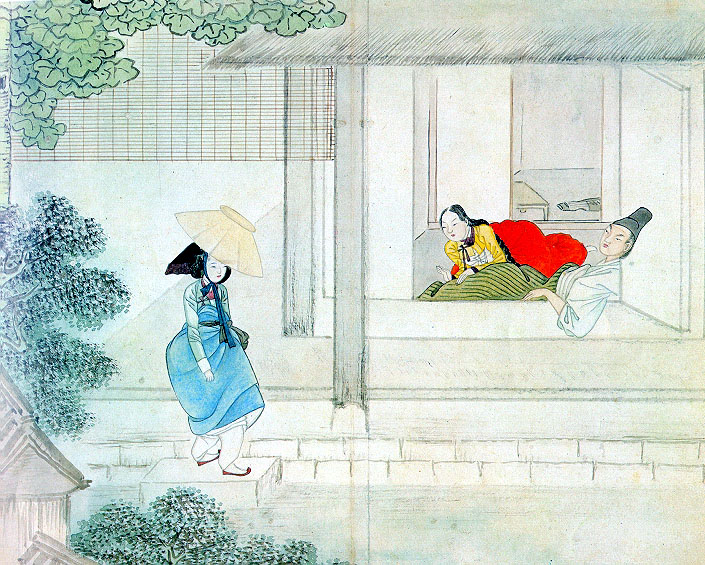

== See also ==
- Jeongjagwan
- Gat
- Manggeon
- Sangtu
- Hanbok
