= Gats =

Gats may refer to:

- Gats (surname)
- Els Quatre Gats ("The Four Cats"), a cafe in Barcelona, Spain which opened on 12 June 1897
- Saint-Cyr-des-Gâts, a village and commune of the Vendée département in France
- "Gats", a song by Susumu Hirasawa from Sword-Wind Chronicle BERSERK Original Soundtrack

GATS may refer to:

- General Agreement on Trade in Services, a treaty of the World Trade Organization
- Tessalit Airport (ICAO identifier: GATS) in Tessalit, Mali

== See also ==
- Gatz, a stage adaptation of The Great Gatsby
- Gat (disambiguation)
