= Manggeon =

Korean traditional headband for men

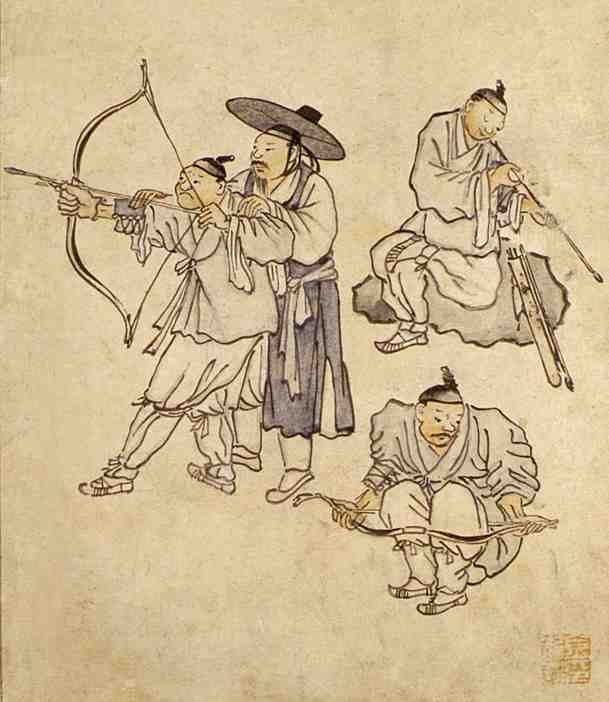
- All men show their manggeon on the head. The man in blue clothing wears his manggeon under gat.

Korean name
- Hangul: 망건
- Hanja: 網巾
- RR: manggeon
- MR: manggŏn

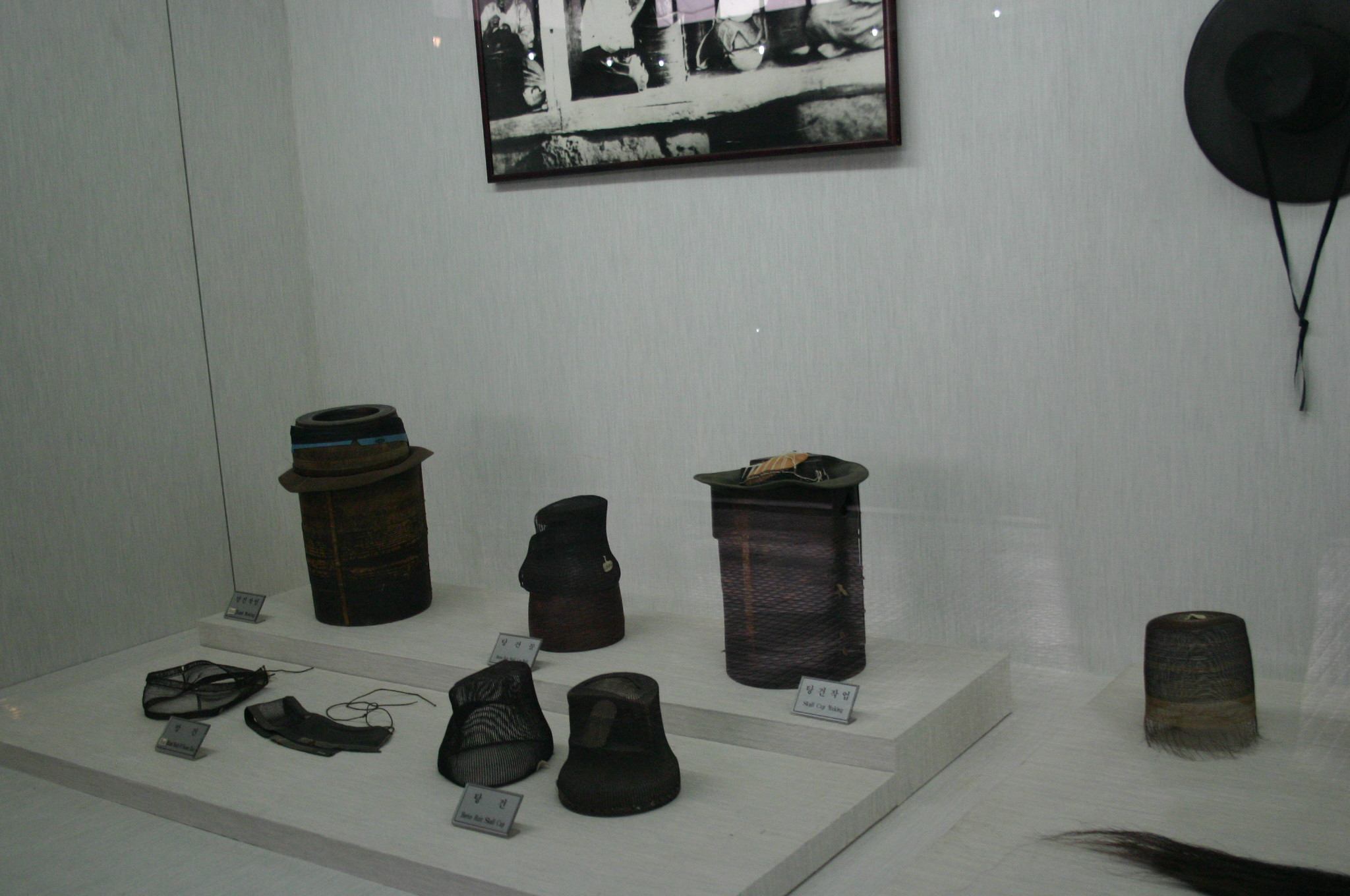
bottom left of the photo

Manggeon (Korean: 망건) is a traditional Korean headband worn by men to hold their hair in place after the sangtu (상투) topknot is done. It is usually made by weaving dyed horsehair (馬尾毛). In Korea, artisans who specialize in making manggeon are called manggeonjang (망건장).

== History ==
According to the legend, earliest people who wore wangjin were the Daoshi. One day, The Hongwu Emperor of Ming Dynasty wore common clothes to visit the folk and he saw a Daoshi wore Wangjin on top of his head. The Emperor asked the Daoshi what is it and then the Daoshi answered: "This is Wangjin, wear it on top of your head, then your hair will gather together"「此曰網巾。裹以頭，則萬髮俱齊。」. The Emperor was really satisfied with this answer that contained meaning of united the country. After the Emperor returned to his palace, he ordered that all the men in the country must wear Wangjin on their head. Afterwards it spreads to Korea and it became the Manggeon in Korea.

The Korean manggeon was originally imported from China but over time developed into a new clothing item with distinct features. Unlike Chinese wangjin which covered the top of the head like a cap, Korean mang-geon is a circular headband that has two strings at each end of the band. The practical development of a headband form can be seen in the way Korean-style top knots called sang-tu were secured by using the string ties of the mang-geon.

Due to the abundance of horse farming in Jejudo, Korean mang-geon was popularly made with horse hair alongside thin human hair which was considered luxurious. The manggeon could also be made out of human hair.

Korean Mang-geon started as a mesh headband and then a popular version seen in K-dramas with a distinct forehead mesh was invented soon after. Both types of mang-geon were used until mang-geon fell out of practice due to state-enforced Short Hair Act during the Korean Empire and Japanese occupation and the increased use of westernized hair.

With the Korean headband form different types of decorations developed. Precious decorations on the mang-geon were used to secure Gat to the head and to secure the loose ends of the headband. The materials used included gold, metals, bone, horn and jade, which showcased the social status of the wearer.

In addition, each Korean region had its own characteristics: Tongyeong manggeon was delicate and of good quality, Seoul manggeon had the good pyeon-ja (lower set of strings), Nonsan manggeon had the best backview, Hwangdeung manggeon had the best frontview, and Gimje's manggeon had good da-ang (top set of strings).

Contemporarily, there are still traditionally inclined people who wear their hair in sang-tu and adorn with mang-geon, as well as Korean national historical intangible cultural asset masters who create the old fashioned mang-geon with traditional methods which include the use of horse hair and human hair.

== Influences ==
The use of horsehair as material in the making of the Chinese wangjin is believed to have been introduced from Joseon to the Ming dynasty.

== See also ==
- Wangjin
- Gat
- Tanggeon
- Jeongjagwan
