= Haller Park =

Haller Park may refer to:

- Haller Park (Kenya), a nature park in Mombasa, Kenya
- Haller Park (Hungary), a park in Budapest, Hungary
