= Wangjin =

Chinese headband

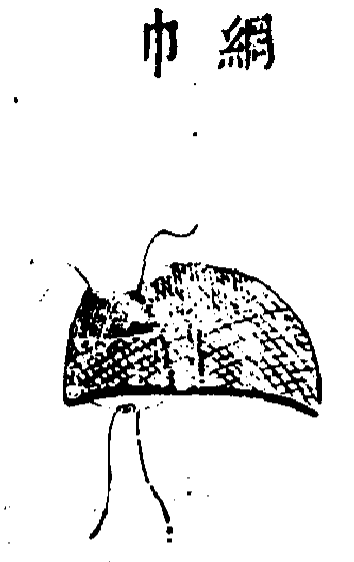
- Wangjin

Chinese name
- Simplified Chinese: 网巾
Transcriptions
Standard Mandarin
- Hanyu Pinyin: wǎngjīn

Vietnamese name
- Vietnamese alphabet: võng cân
- Chữ Hán: 網巾

Korean name
- Hangul: 망건
- Hanja: 網巾
Transcriptions
- Revised Romanization: manggeon
- McCune–Reischauer: manggŏn

Wangjin is a kind of traditional headgear worn by adult men in the Chinese Ming Dynasty. In ancient China, the wangjin was usually made out of fibres or horsetail or could be made out of mixed fabrics such as silk or linen. The Korean manggeon of the Joseon period was a derivative of the wangjin and was introduced to Joseon during the Ming dynasty. Similar head-wears to the wangjin was also worn during the from the Later Lê dynasty to the Nguyễn dynasty of Vietnam and in the Ryukyu Kingdom.

== History ==
According to the legend, the earliest people who wore wangjin were Taoist priests. One day, the Hongwu Emperor of the Ming dynasty wore common clothes to visit the folk and he saw a Taoist priest wearing wangjin on top of his head. The emperor asked what it was, to which the priest answered:

"This is wangjin. Wear it on top of your head, then your hair will gather together" (ref. "此曰網巾. 裹以頭, 則萬髮俱齊").

The emperor was very satisfied with the answer that also referred to uniting the country. After the emperor returned to his palace, he ordered all the men in the country, from the emperor to the common man, to wear wangjin. Since then, the wangjin has become the common headgear of adult men in the entire country.

Wang Bu, a man from the Qing dynasty, once introduced the wangjin as something that looks like a fishing net. The two borders are adorned with two small circles made of gold, jade or copper and tin. Tie small ropes at each end of the side, cross in two circles, tie the top to the forehead, and make the side and eyebrows flush. There are also many styles of wangjin. In the Wanli period of the Ming dynasty, people began to use fallen hair and horsehair instead of silk to make wangjin.

During the collapse of the Ming dynasty, the Manchu emperor of the Qing dynasty ordered all men to shave their forehead under the Tifayifu policy, the use of wangjin in China came to an end.

Nowadays, historians and the people interested in Chinese history research ancient books and historical relics to restore various forms of the wangjin.

== Gallery ==
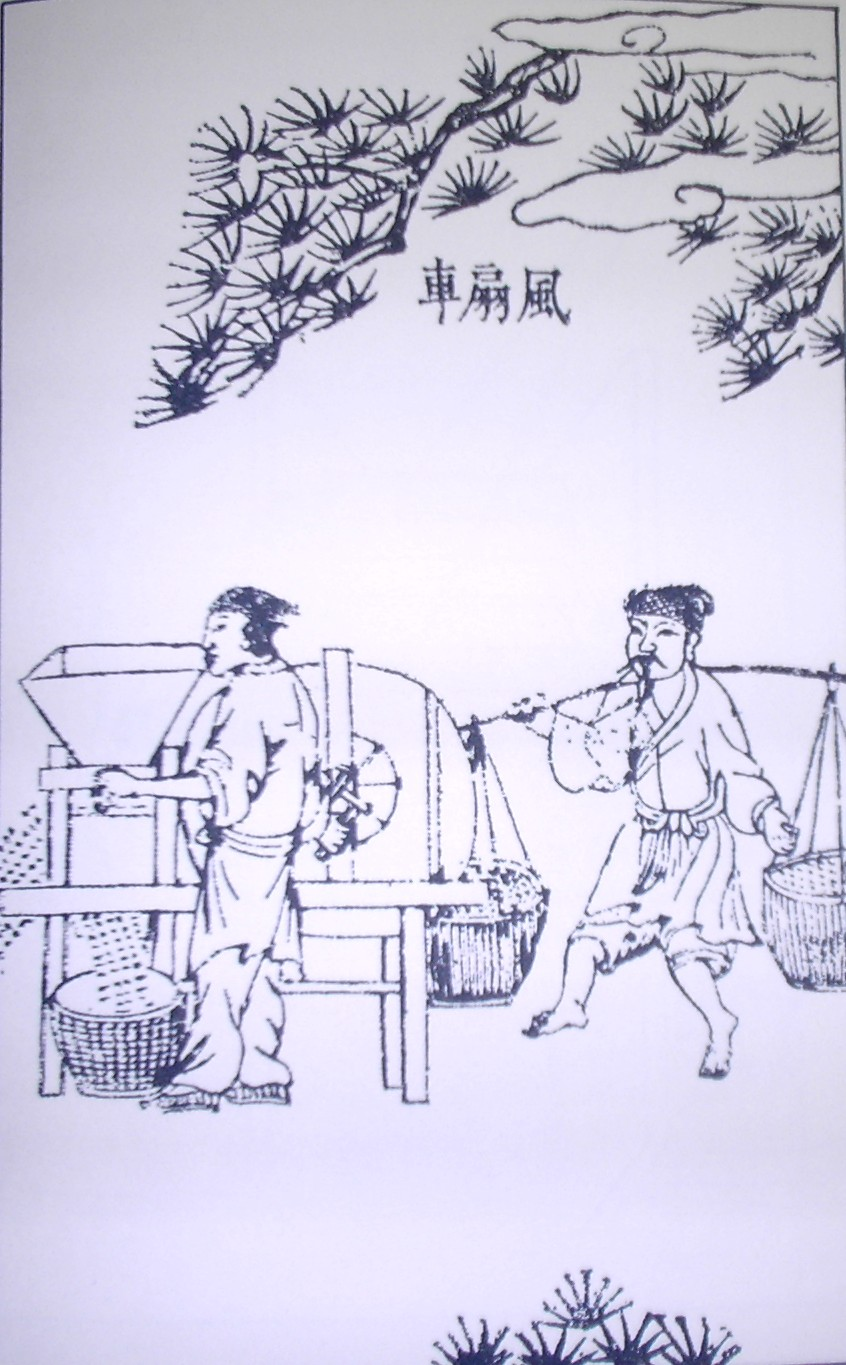
Men wearing a wangjin and working on a winnowing machine, illustrated in the book Tiangong Kaiwu from the Ming dynasty.

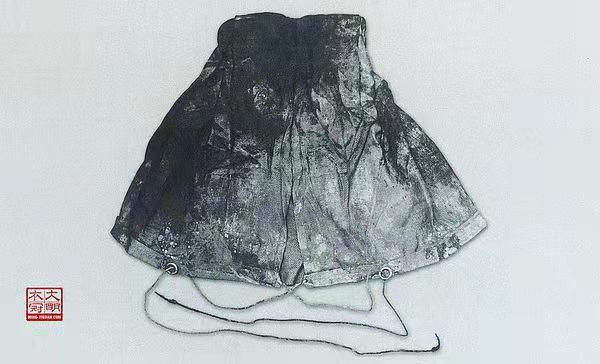
A wangjin unearthed from the tomb of Zhang Mao and his wife in the Ming dynasty.

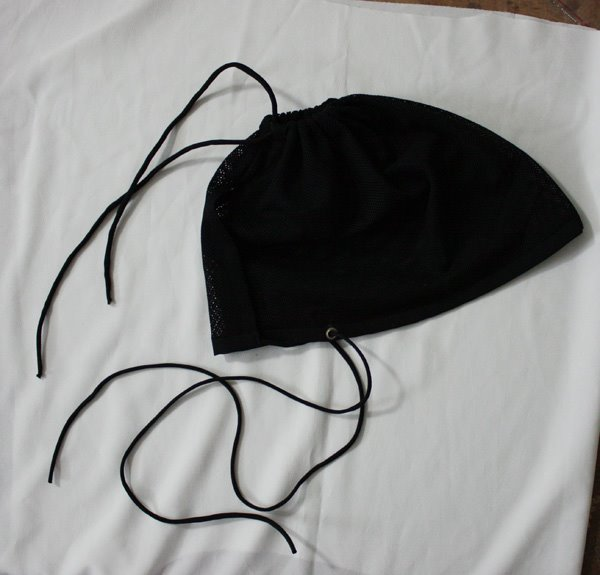
Modern replica of a wangjin.

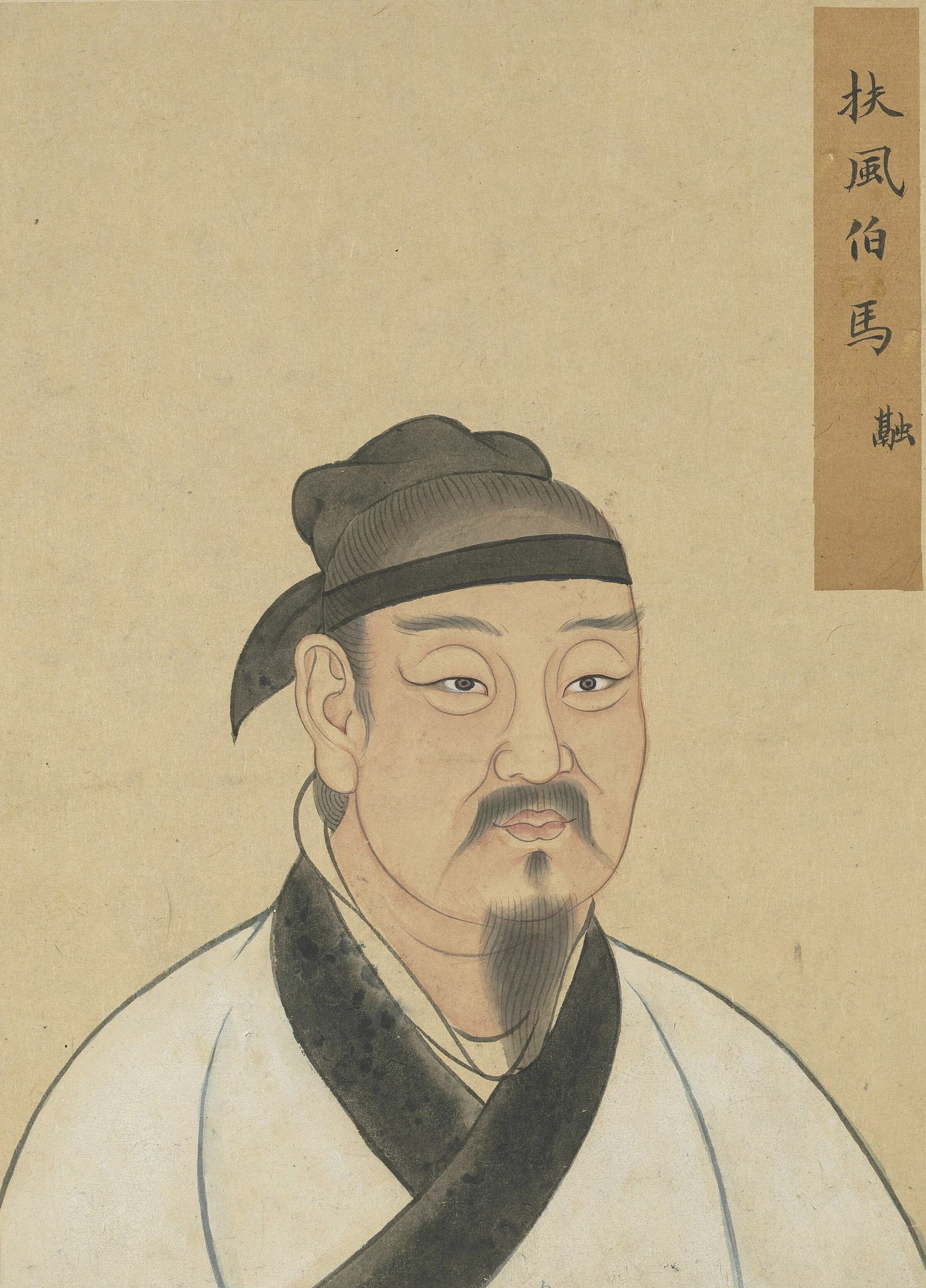
Ming dynasty portrait of a man wearing wangjin.

== See also ==
- Manggeon
- Hanfu
- Nanjing
- Ming Dynasty
