= Haller utca =

Street in Budapest, Hungary

Coordinates: 47.47656°N 19.07985°E

Haller utca

Haller utca is a main street along the border of Mid-Ferencváros, in the 9th district of Budapest, Hungary. It links Nagyvárad tér in the north and Soroksári út in the west. Notable sidestreets include Tűzoltó utca, Balázs Béla utca, Gát utca, Mester utca and Vaskapu utca. The street is named after the Haller family, who were of Tyrolean origin, once settled in Bavaria, and then became principal nobles in the early modern Hungary. According to some reviews the street is named after János Haller (1626–1697), who was a prominent figure of the family.

The 1.5-kilometre long Haller utca runs from Nagyvárad tér to the Danube, being flanked by the vast green expanses of Haller park and crossing Mester utca on its way. It is also famous for its planes and green hedges along the pavements. The street used to be a dam to keep off floods, which is still evident in the fact that it actually descends from Nagyvárad tér and in that many sidestreets are lower. One of its sidestreets, Gát utca, indeed translates as "Dam Street". The southern side of Haller utca is occupied by municipal and office buildings including István kórház (a hospital), Ferencvárosi Művelődési Központ (a culture centre) the district's police station, the regional headquarters of the tax authority and the brand new Haller Gardens office block. Its northern side, by contrast, is dotted with apartment blocks of all kinds. Whereas the northern tip at Nagyvárad tér includes a housing estate from the 1980s, its western end at the Danube still sports some original purpose-built housing as workers' colonies from the early 20th century. The tramtracks can be found in the middle of the road; however, just a decade earlier, they used to be situated near the two pavements along a 1 kilometre stretch, a remainder of Pest's old time tram system.

== Buildings of note ==
The western side of Haller utca is lined with residential apartment blocks, three different small-size housing estates and a workers' colony at the Soroksári út end. The eastern/southern side is predominantly home to municipal and office buildings:

Even numbers

- the red-brick residential corner house from the turn of the century (Haller utca 88, Üllői út 121)
- housing estate (5 10-storey blocks)
- housing estate (3 diagonal 4 storey-blocks)
- housing estate (a block with 5-storey tile-roofed houses)
- 4-storey houses
- workers' colonies

Odd numbers

- István hospital
- National Cardiology Centre
- Ferencváros Cultural Centre
- Ferencváros camping site
- Szent Vince Church in Haller park
- Ferencváros Police station
- Regional HQ of the Tax Authority
- Haller Gardens office complex
- Zwack Unicum site

== Transportation ==
The street is served by tram line 24 (termini at Közvágóhíd and Keleti railways station), which has four stops on its route: Nagyvárad tér, Balázs Béla utca, Mester utca, and Soroksári út.
