= Mester utca =

Mester utca (Hungarian pronunciation: [ˈmɛʃtɛr ˈut͡sːɒ]) is a 2-kilometre main street in the district of Ferencváros, Budapest, Hungary. It connects Ferenc körút and Könyves Kálmán körút via Haller utca, dividing Mid-Ferencváros into two unequal sections. Its name derives from "mester", meaning master, which refers back to the fact that the street used to host numerous artisan's workshops.

== Buildings ==
The street's buildings include:

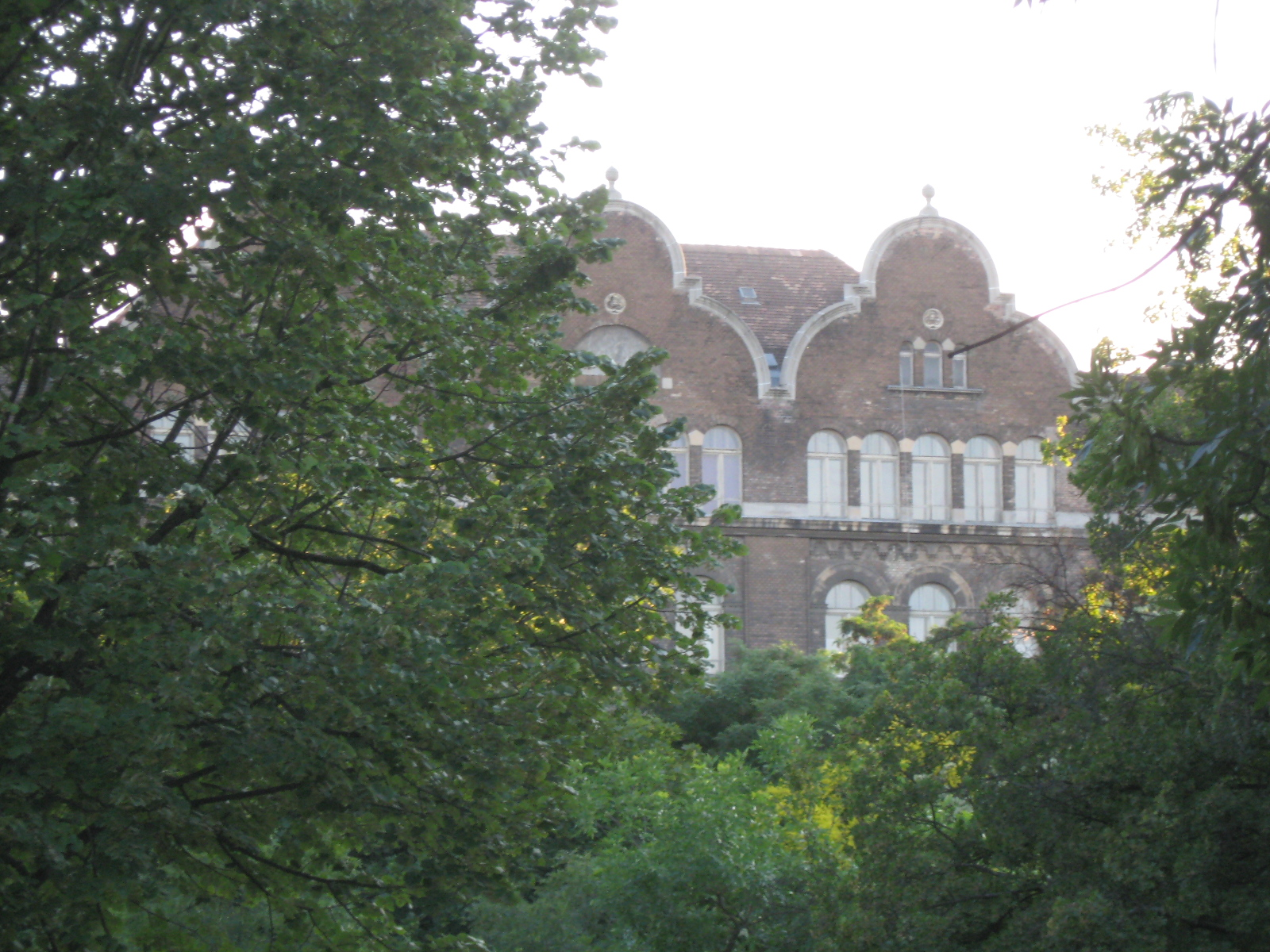
József Attila school, viewed from Haller park

- Fáy András Secondary School (car mechanics)
- Teleki Blanka Secondary School (economics, finance)
- Szent István Secondary School (economics; also famous for its specialisation in football)
- József Attila Primary School (Attila József, one of the most outstanding Hungarian poets attended a few classes here)
- Szent Vince church (catholic)
- Mester utca 1 (Latinovits Zoltán, the great Hungarian actor, used to live here)
- Lurdy Ház, a shopping mall
- Archives for Pest Megye

== Description ==
The street is lined by plane trees, most of which date back to the early 20th century. The street is full of cafeterias, small snack outlets and shops of all kind.

A typical red-brick building in Mester utca

Besides planes, red-brick is a hallmark of Mester utca. Many residential blocks are made of red brick, which tendency has continued up to this day, with some of the new houses also exposing brickwork.

Red brick buildings include:

- Mester utca 12 (1910s)
- Mester utca 20 (1920s)
- Mester utca 22 (1920s)
- Mester utca 24-28 (2008)
- Mester utca 30 (2002) (office block Páva)
- Mester utca 40-44 (2004)
- Mester utca 49 (1930s) District Health Centre
- Mester utca 67 (1900s) József Attila Primary School

== Transportation ==
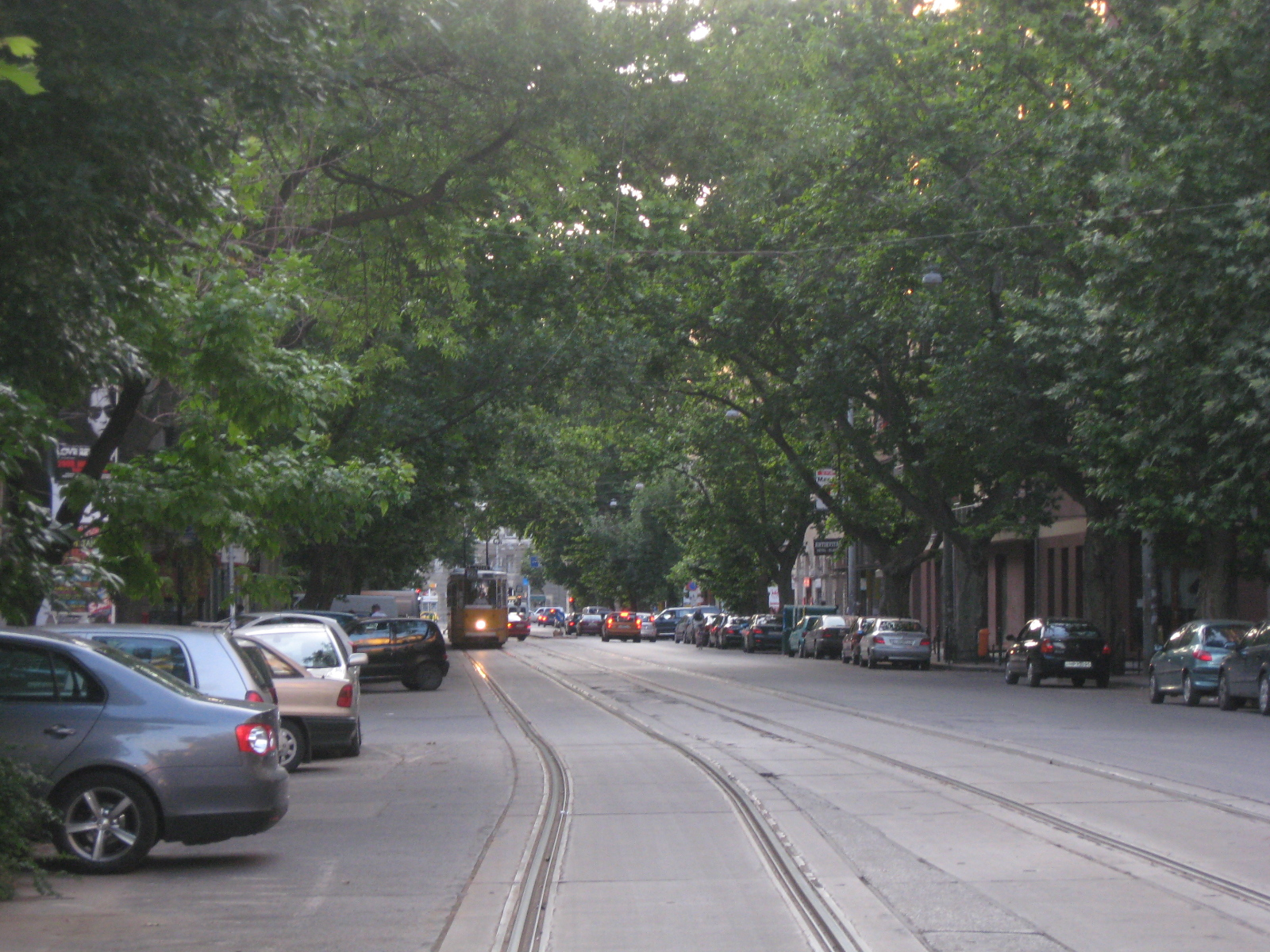
Tram 30 approaching from Ferenc körút terminus on Mester utca

Mester utca is well-served by public transport. It can be reached by trams 4 and 6 (stop Mester utca/Ferenc körút) on the northern end. From the south one can get there by taking tram 1 (stop Mester utca, Könyves Kálmán körút). Tram 24 and bus 281 crosses Mester utca at its intersection with Haller utca (stop Haller utca/Mester utca).

Tram lines 51 (recently renamed from 30) and 51A (recently renamed from 30A) run along Mester utca from 5 in the morning till 11.30 at night (terminus at Mester utca/Ferenc körút, stops at Bokréta utca, Ferencvárosi rendelőintézet, Haller utca/Mester utca by Haller park, Vágóhíd utca by Haller park, Mester utca/Könyves Kálmán körút). Tram 51A has its other terminus at Mester utca/Könyves Kálmán körút whereas tram 51 continues along Gubacsi út to Pesterzsébet, the 20th district of Budapest.

Night bus 923 also runs along Mester utca.
