= Ferencváros =

9th District of Budapest Budapest IX. kerülete Ferencváros
- District of Budapest
- District IX
- Flag Coat of arms

- Location of District IX in Budapest (shown in grey)
- Coordinates: 47°28′N 19°05′E
- Country: Hungary
- Region: Central Hungary
- City: Budapest
- Established: 17 November 1873
- Quarters: List: Belső-Ferencváros; József Attila-lakótelep; Középső-Ferencváros; Külső-Ferencváros

Government
  - Mayor: Krisztina Baranyi (Ind.)

Area
  - Total: 12.53 km^{2} (4.84 sq mi)
  - Rank: 16th

Population (2016)
  - Total: 59,056
  - Rank: 16th
  - Density: 4,713/km^{2} (12,210/sq mi)
- Demonym: kilencedik kerületi (“9th districter”)
- Time zone: UTC+1 (CET)
  - Summer (DST): UTC+2 (CEST)
- Postal code: 1091 ... 1098
- Website: www.ferencvaros.hu

Ferencváros (Hungarian: [ˈfɛrɛnt͡svaːroʃ], English: Francis City) is the 9th district of Budapest (Hungarian: Budapest IX. kerülete), Hungary.

== Name ==
The southern suburb of Pest was named after King Francis I on 4 December 1792 when he was crowned king of Hungary.

== History ==
The development of Ferencváros began in the late 18th century. In both 1799 and 1838, many buildings in Ferencváros were destroyed by flooding of the River Danube. Subsequent construction utilized brick and stone instead of mud bricks, thus preventing serious flood damage. Industrialisation of the district occurred during the second half of the 19th century. During this period, Ferencváros' five mills, slaughterhouse (the largest in Hungary) and Central Market Hall were constructed.

Mixed district: has areas along the Danube (the National Theatre, Müpa, the Palace of Arts are located here, more universities in or close to the area); has a semi-pedestrian street, Ráday utca, with plenty of restaurants, cafes; and the inner areas with many new buildings (see below).

== Ferencváros today ==
Mainly due to recent large-scale housing redevelopment and ensuing gentrification, in the past 15 years former working-class Ferencváros has progressed significantly from how it once was. Property prices are relatively high for the region.

== Population ==
The current population is 60,323 (2003 census). Ferencváros has various traditional ethnic minorities represented: most importantly Bulgarians, Germans, Croats, Serbs and Slovaks. The Roma population has been decreasing in the past 10 years as many of them gravitate to neighbouring districts with cheaper accommodation.

Due to the large universities located in the district (Corvinus, Semmelweis) and some more in the vicinity (Budapest University of Technology and Economics), a recent trend is the influx of foreign students of German (Semmelweis University of Medicine), Arabic, Pakistani (working in IT), Indian (working in IT), Norwegian (Semmelweis University of Medicine) and African backgrounds who rent apartments alongside Hungarian students coming from the countryside. Small Chinese and Vietnamese enterprises have also cropped up: these are mostly fast food bars and second-hand clothes shops. Turks are also represented through their kebab houses.

== Areas ==
=== Inner Ferencváros ===
Traditionally, Belső (=Inner) Ferencváros has always been the wealthiest part of the district, with preserved apartment blocks dating back to the late 19th century and even earlier. In contrast to its bourgeois past, these days Ráday utca, the main artery of "publand" Ferencváros, has a bohemian atmosphere. The concentration of well over 50 entertainment establishments (pubs, bars, clubs, restaurants, art galleries, culture institutes, open-air concert venue) along a stretch of barely more than 1.3 kilometres is one of the densest in Budapest, the environs of Liszt Ferenc tér (Liszt Ferenc Square) being a major competitor.

Ráday utca is also known as "Kultutca", with book shows and arts festivals every spring and autumn and a summer opera festival in June.

On the Danube riverside, one can find a mixed picture. Together with its fin-de-siecle main campus building still dominating the area south of the bridgehead of Szabadság híd (former Ferencz József híd), the new high-tech wing of the Corvinus University is also a major architectural landmark of the area. Behind is Vásárcsarnok, the Central Market Hall, whose upper souvenir floor can get overfull of tourists in peak season. However, by its side, Leaving the university campus behind, is the Közraktárak, "Public Warehouses", which are earmarked for redevelopment. To the south, Nehru Park provides green space for residents.

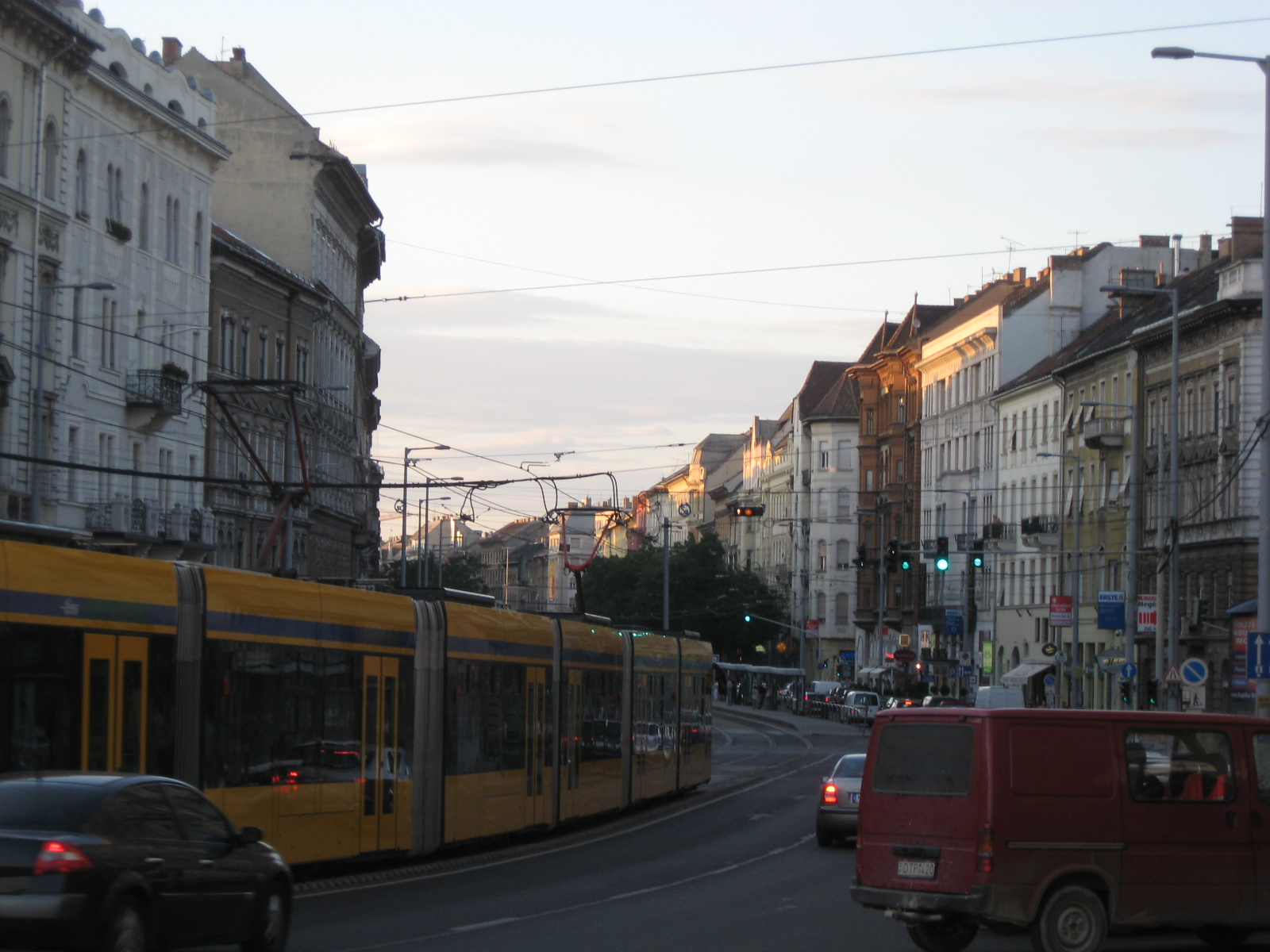
Ferenc körút on a Saturday evening.

The southernmost strip of Nagykörút, the "Grand Boulevard", is here called Ferenc körút. Starting off from Petőfi híd's bridgehead at Boráros tér, it descends towards Mester utca, and continues up to Üllői út, which forms the boundary between Ferencváros and District VIII, called Józsefváros. Although this stretch has houses with equal grandeur to those on more northern Teréz Körút and Szent István körút, the vast majority have less friezework and fewer storeys. This boulevard, a major thoroughfare with tramlines (trams 4 and 6, now served by Combino trams) in the middle, is also fast becoming dominated by eateries, partly due to its proximity to Ráday utca and to some open-air music venues on the nearby Buda bridgehead of Petőfi híd.

=== Central Ferencváros ===
This traditionally working-class dominated part of the district is most famous for its still ongoing successful redevelopment projects.

Until the Industrial Revolution, the place had been dominated by small farms and gardens, which is also reflected in some of the street names (Bokréta utca, Viola utca). Living in one-storey houses along streets leading in between plots of gardens, at that time artisans dominated the social landscape (whence the street name Mester utca). In the second half of the 19th century, two important changes shaped the social set-up of the area. First, the traffic of ships with wheat and other grain cargo grew rapidly. These ships hailed to huge riverside mills. Besides, various slaughterhouses were established in the southern part of this area.

On this account, Ferencváros was aptly called "the stomach of Budapest". Secondly, numerous factories were placed strategically along the railway tracks of the huge freight railways station Ferencváros and on the bank of the Danube, leading also to nearby ship docks on Csepel island. For the workforce needed for such industries as rubber tyre and chemicals, a dense array of 2-4-storey apartment blocks were built north to the brown fields. The industrial heritage is still visible: numerous museums and public venues in converted industrial buildings (Trafó, whose name derives from "transformer station", Közraktárak, meaning warehouses, Borjúvágóhíd, meaning "calf slaughterhouse", Gizella Malom, a mill, and others) and some typical building projects for the workers (the Danube end of Haller utca, Gát utca) are still present in the area. The rehabilitation projects left most of the residential blocks intact as new houses were built only on empty plots or as annexes. At the same time, the typical backyards system was eliminated, as into the spaces cleared from backhouses there came lavish greenery and secluded recreational facilities.

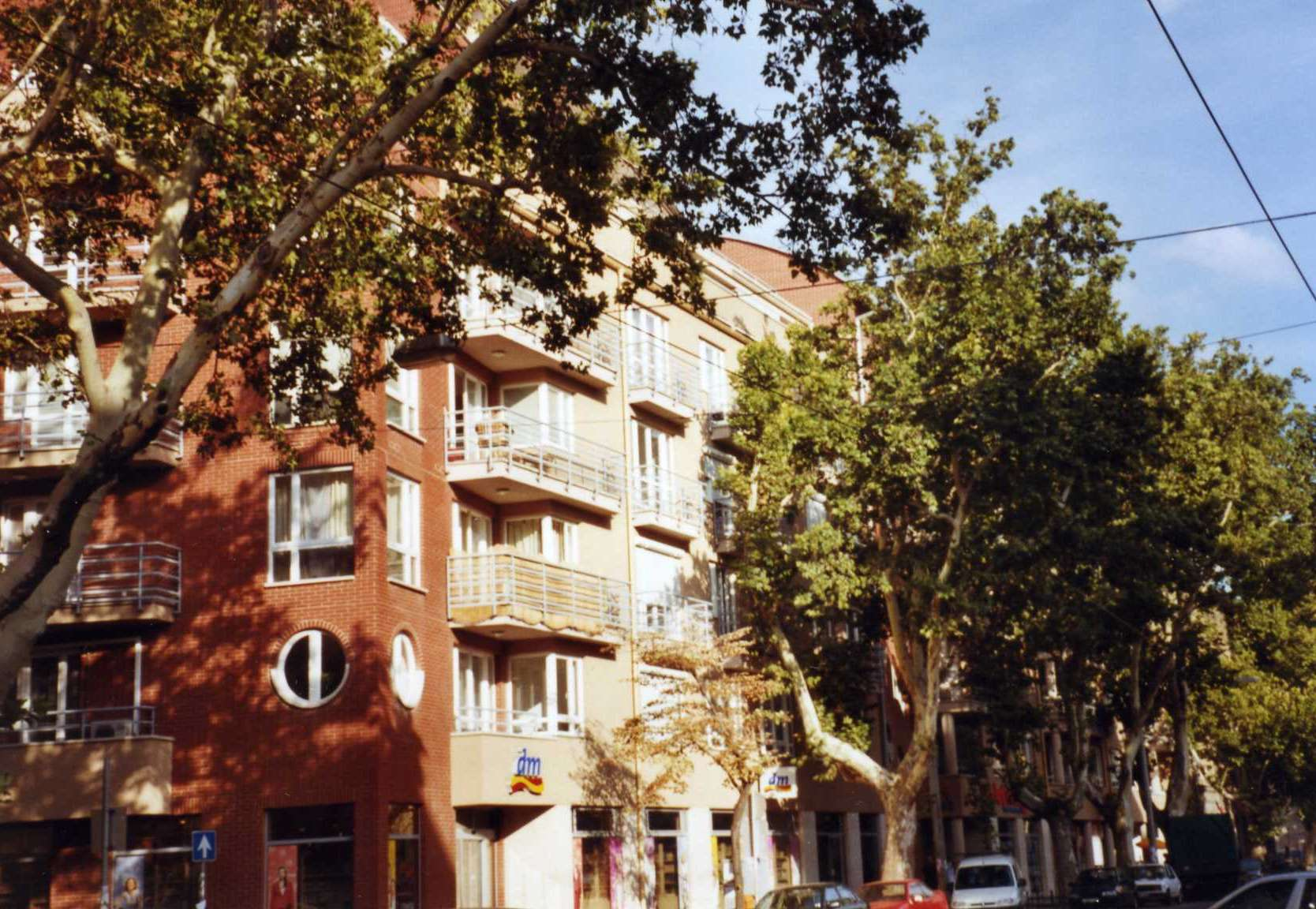
Leafy inner Mester utca.

Just like Ráday utca, the main street of Central Ferencváros, plane-lined Mester utca, roughly follows the bend of the Danube. It is often called a "village" in itself by the residents. In fact, Mester utca has the best prospects to become the southern extension of Ráday utca. Mester utca has various guises along its way, too. Its inner, busiest stretch is from Ferenc körút to Haller utca, with Szent Vince templom as a landmark at this point. In contrast, its midsection, from Haller utca to Könyves Kálmán körút, is quieter and even greener past Haller park. Finally, its outermost stretch goes well into brownfield in Outer Ferencváros. Architecturewise, the street is interspersed with red/klinker brick buildings both of early 20th century Danish and of the late functionalist type. New residential buildings and two office blocks have sprung up in the past 10 years while redecoration has also been a prominent feature.

Lenhossék park corner

Rejuvenation in the rehabilitation area is most conspicuous along the axes of partially pedestrianised Tompa utca and Balázs Béla utca, both parallel to Mester utca. The two streets connect through Ferenc tér, the original centre of the neighbourhood. The area from Angyal utca to Ferenc tér is dotted with numerous new hotels popular with Scandinavian tourists. Balázs Béla utca and some streets off still have a few late 19th-century single-storey houses with a large gate and a spacious yard between the two sidewings. In this neighbourhood, besides the obligatory redecoration and the badly needed sanitary conversions, the award-winning redevelopment projects eliminated the backyard system typical of central Pest. The backhouses and smaller annexes were demolished to make space for open communal gardens with various facilities to which now all the residents of the given block have easy access from inside. Led by the local council, the award-winning redevelopment combines municipal and private financing. The council's own projects attracted developers to build on empty plots already being surrounded by upgraded housing.

Occupying an entire block cleared from slums, Lenhossék park is the latest recreational park in the area. It has sports grounds and a playground but just a few young trees. Changes to the immediate vicinity have been dramatic after its completion: new office buildings, fashionable eateries and student halls have sprung up around within a few years. The new campus extension to Semmelweis University of Medicine also helps upgrade the area. The next projects in line affect the areas southwest to the park, which have the densest housing in the whole district. This relatively poor area includes Gát utca, the street where one of the most outstanding Hungarian poets of the 20th century, Attila József, was born. The imminent reconstruction of Gát utca is going to be funded by the EU.

Haller utca.

The 1.5-kilometre long Haller utca runs from Nagyvárad tér to the Danube, being flanked by the vast green expanses of Haller park and crossing Mester utca on its way. It is also famous for its planes and green hedges along the pavements. The street used to be a dam to keep off floods, which is still evident in the fact that it actually descends from Nagyvárad tér and in that many side streets are lower. One of its side streets, Gát utca, indeed translates as "Dam Street". The southern side of Haller utca is occupied by municipal and office buildings including István kórház (a hospital), Ferencvárosi Művelődési Központ (a culture centre) the district's police station, the regional headquarters of the tax authority and the brand new Haller Gardens office block. Its northern side, by contrast, is dotted with apartment blocks of all kinds. Whereas the northern tip at Nagyvárad tér includes a housing estate from the 1980s, its western end at the Danube still sports some original purpose-built housing as workers' colonies from the early 20th century. The tramtracks can be found in the middle of the road; however, just a decade earlier, they used to be situated near the two pavements along a 1 kilometre stretch, a remainder of Pest's old time tram system.

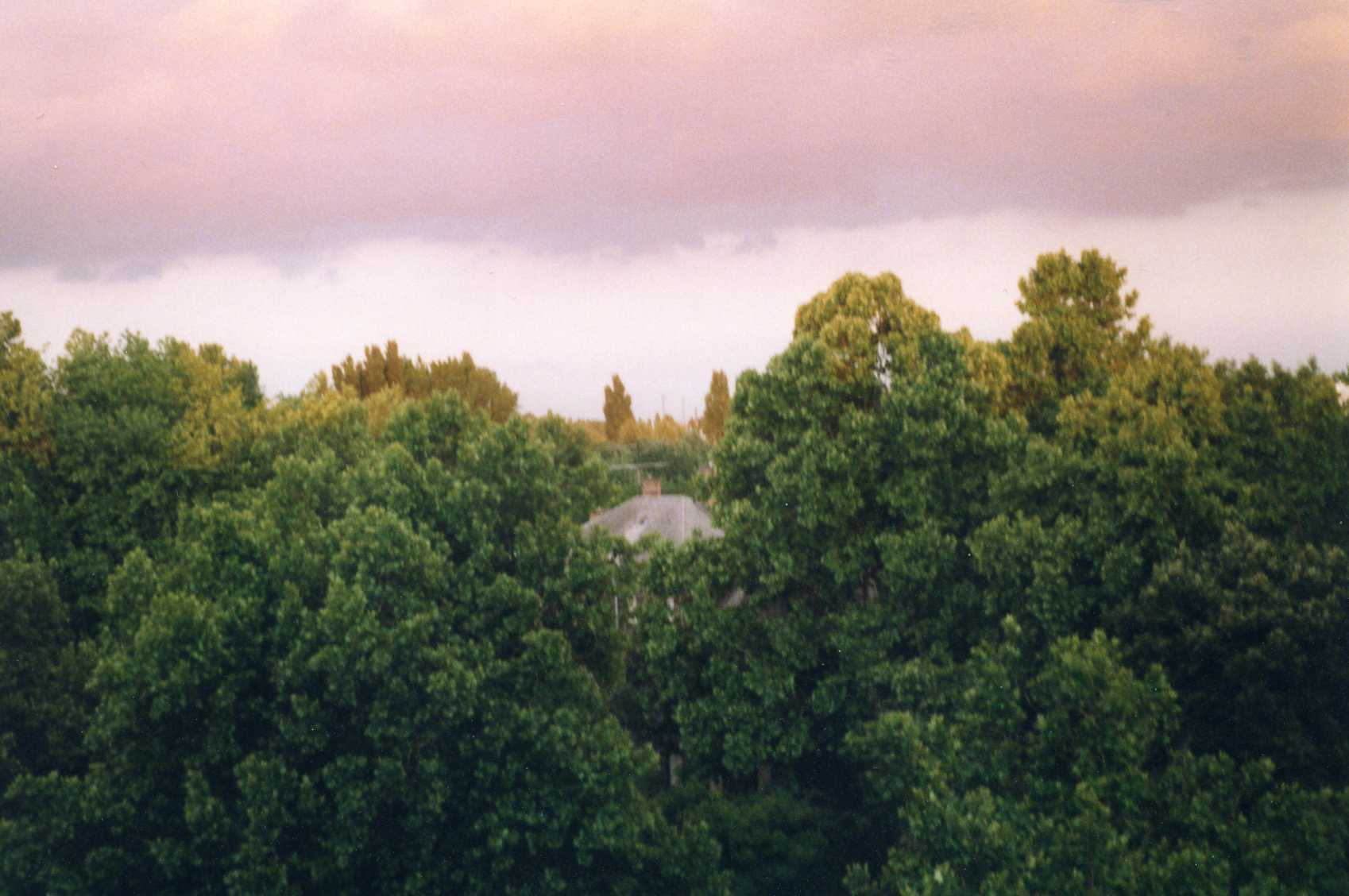
Haller park after rain.

In the early 20th century the district's largest green park, Haller park, used to be partly a ground for weekly fairs and markets, partly a cemetery around Szent Vince templom. The daily market called Haller piac had to be moved behind the cultural centre next to the popular camp site to clear space for a new housing development. The market is earmarked to be terminated altogether. The park has a rich flora and fauna: birds include: blue tits, blackbirds, swallows, robins, magpies and the omnipresent sparrows and pigeons on the north and northwestern edge of the park. Hedgehogs and squirrels are less visible dwellers. Trees include plane, linden, birch, willow, poplar, and yew.

Further to the west, redevelopment reached the Vaskapu utca neighbourhood somewhat later. Here the number of available and suitable empty plots was limited. However, the plots are more spacious and, consequently, the projects vaster. Some of the cornmills have been converted into offices and some of them to loft-type apartments, with views over the river. At the end of Vaskapu utca, Vágóhíd utca is home to a chocolate factory, several housing estates and the district's fire brigade. The Bulgarians have their own church, cultural institute and a hotel here. A new huge building project is in the pipeline for the western part of the street, by Soroksári út. This latter road is the major thoroughfare on the riverside; it is heavily congested despite being served well by public transport (trams 2 and 24; buses 23, 54 and 55; suburban train to Csepel). The road has seen various large-scale developments since 2000: the National Theatre, the Palace of Arts (MÜPA) stand side by side next to office blocks all along the embankment. The Central European University is to relocate here in the near future. The view over the Danube with the Buda hills beyond is worth this short walk.

=== Outer Ferencváros ===
South of the green belt of the district lies brownfield Ferencváros. Könyves Kálmán körút, a ring road, has seen a surge in office blocks building. Besides the various office blocks and a shopping mall, one can find the Ferencváros TC football stadium, the brand new national bus terminal and the train stop Ferencváros on the western railways. On the Danube shore lies the National Athletics Centre.

On the shore of the Ráckevei-Danube branch lies the abandoned food market called Nagyvásártelep. This is the area of a planned development of student housing. South of it lies the Soroksári út Marshalling Yard on Rail line 150. Three radial roads pass across Outer Ferencváros: Soroksári út (inner section of Road 5), Gyáli út (entrance to M5 motorway), and Üllői út (inner section of Road 4) forming its eastern border. Partially abandoned industrial areas lie between Soroksári and Gyáli út, with the large Ferencváros Marshalling Yard, and some low density housing estates. Between Gyáli and Üllői út lies a major panel housing complex, József Attila-lakótelep. To its south, Kiserdő ("Little Forest") park borders it to Wekerletelep in District XIX.

== Football ==
Ferencváros is home to Hungarian football club Ferencvárosi Torna Club.

== Parish Church ==
The Parish Church of St. Francis of Assisi was built by Miklós Ybl in French Roman style. It is decorated with wall-paintings by famous artists, such as Mór Than and Károly Lotz, and statues by Alajos Stróbl.

== Sights ==
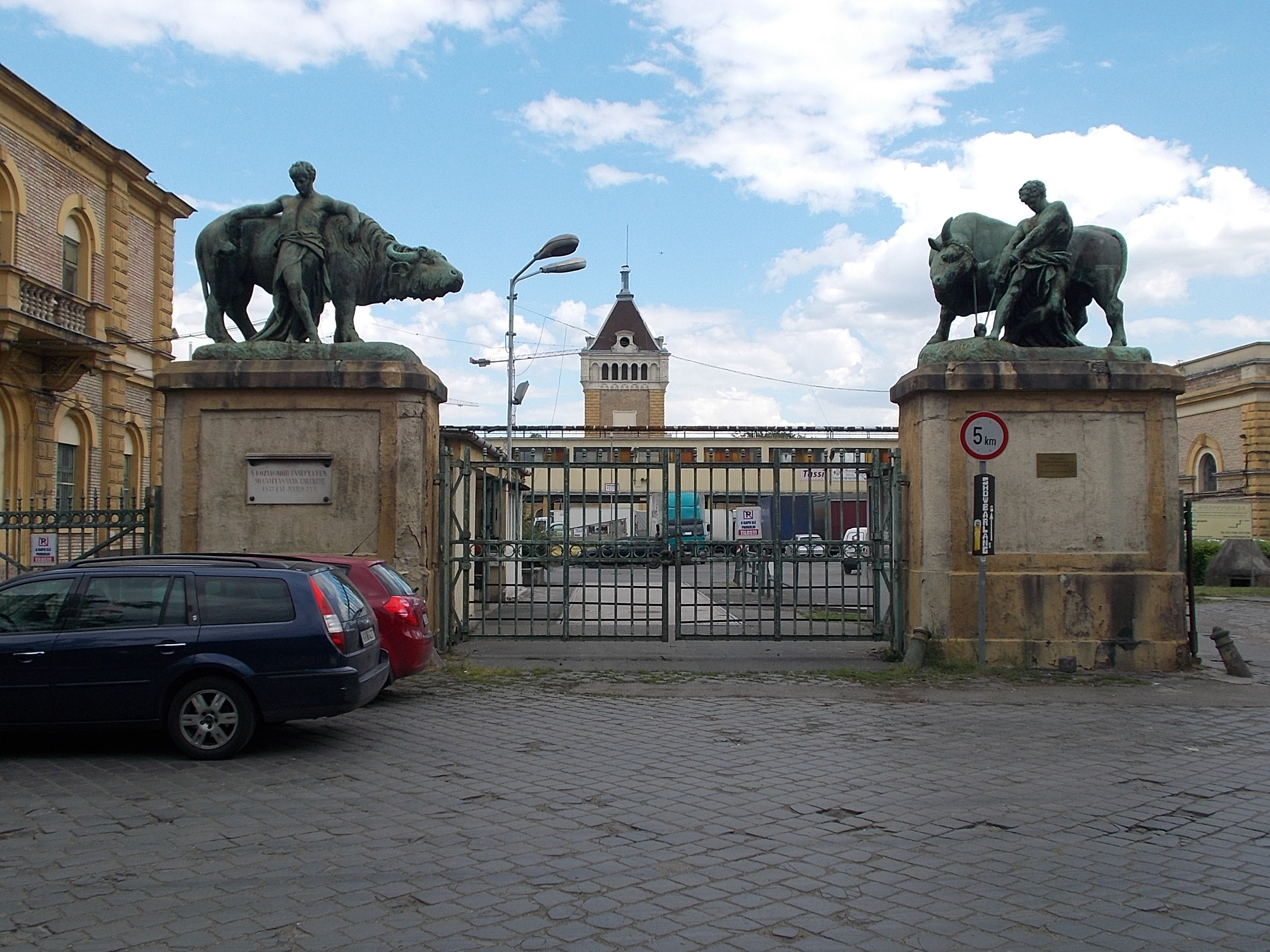
The Central City Communal Slaughterhouse (1872)

- Calvinist Church at Kálvin tér
- Corvinus University of Budapest
- Museum of Applied Arts
- Zwack Unicum Museum and Visitor Centre (Dandár u. 1)
- National Theatre
- Palace of Arts, including the National Concert Hall.
- Central Market Hall

== Politics ==
The current mayor of IX. District of Budapest is Krisztina Baranyi (Independent (Note: Baranyi was an independent candidate supported by Momentum–DK–MSZP–Dialogue–LMP–Jobbik-MKKP)).

The District Assembly, elected at the 2019 local government elections, is made up of 18 members (1 Mayor, 12 Individual constituencies MEPs and 5 Compensation List MEPs) divided into this political parties and alliances:

Party	Seats	Current District Assembly
Opposition coalition (Note: Coalition of Momentum–DK–MSZP–Dialogue–LMP–Jobbik.)	12	M
Fidesz-KDNP	5	
Ferencváros Association of Local Patriots	1	

=== List of mayors ===
Member	Party	Date
Ferenc Gegesy	SZDSZ	1990–2010
Ferenc Gegesy	Ind.	1990–2010
János Bácskai	Fidesz	2010–2019
Krisztina Baranyi	Ind.	2019–

== Twin towns – sister cities ==
Ferencváros is twinned with:

- Berehove, Ukraine
- Kanjiža, Serbia
- Kráľovský Chlmec, Slovakia
- Sfântu Gheorghe, Romania

== Gallery ==
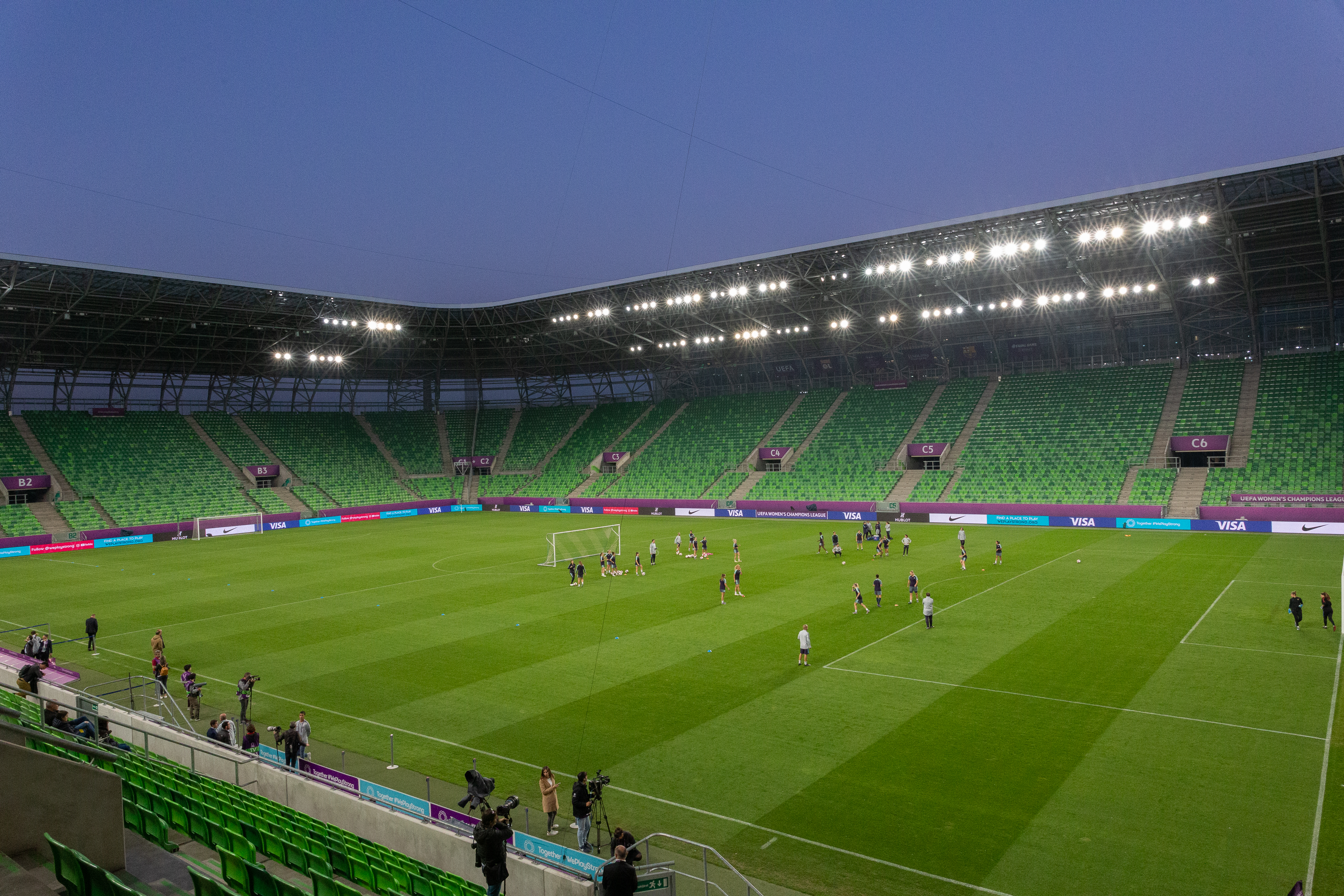
Ferencváros Stadion

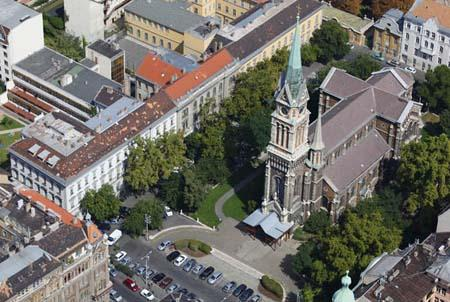
Bakáts square

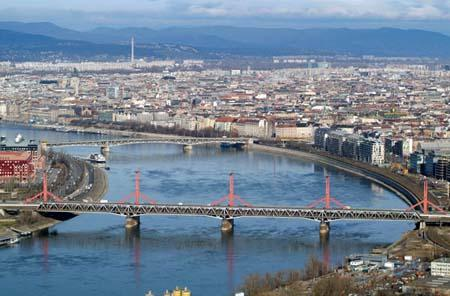
Rákóczi Bridge

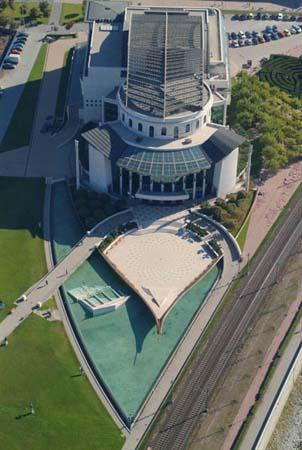
National Theater

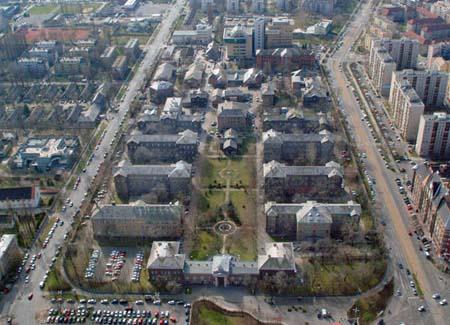
St István hospital

== See also ==
- List of districts in Budapest
