= Gat air pistol =

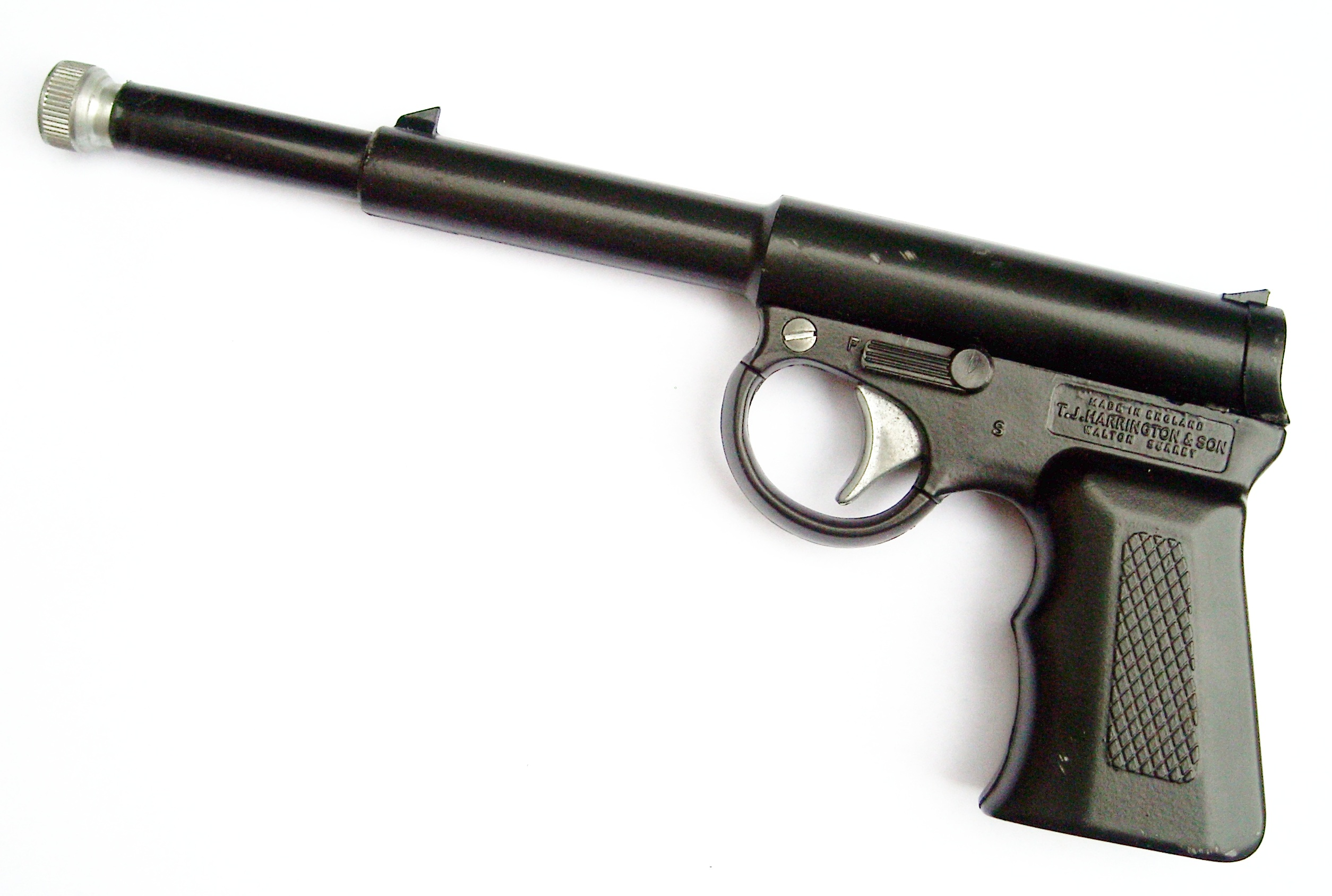
- An uncocked Gat pistol with the barrel extended
- Type: Air pistol Air rifle
- Place of origin: United Kingdom

Production history
- Variants: Gat pistol Gat rifle

Specifications
- Cartridge: .177 pellet.177 dart cork
- Barrels: 1
- Feed system: 1
- Sights: Iron

The Gat air pistol was an air pistol of British origin. The pistol can fire .177 pellets, ball bearings, darts and also corks. The Gat pistol has also become popular in funfairs and arcade stalls. Another example is the Gat air rifle, produced from 1988.

== History ==
The Gat was produced from the late 1930s to the mid-1990s by T J Harrington & Co Ltd. of Magda Works, Walton on Thames, Surrey. There was a break in production during World War II, resuming shortly afterwards. Production finally ended with the death of Mr Harrington, increasing overseas competition and a declining public interest in 'nasty bits of machinery'.

Other Harrington products included the 'Ding Dong' slingshot and the 'Little Kraka' fishing reel, both using similar die-cast construction.

== Operation ==
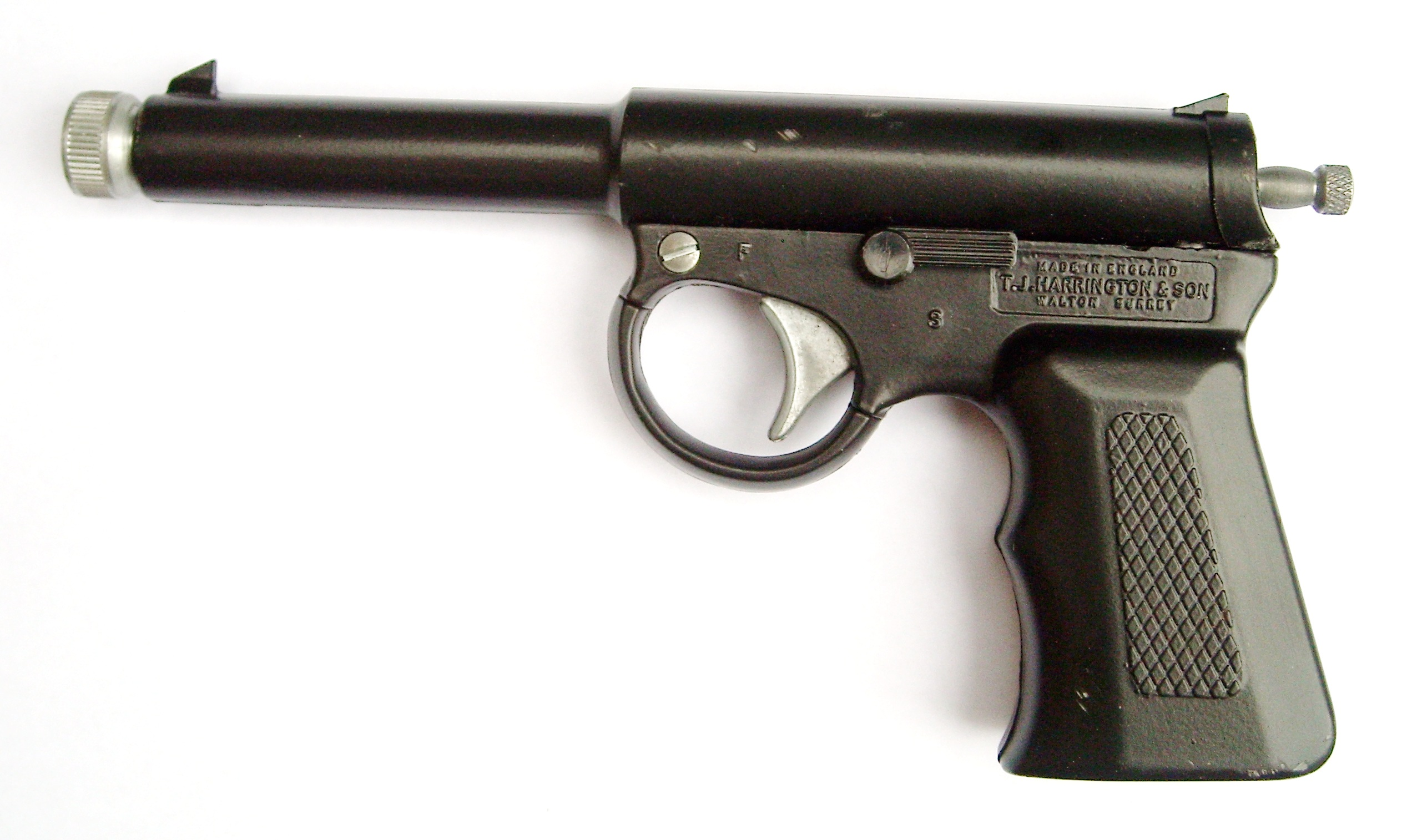
Cocked

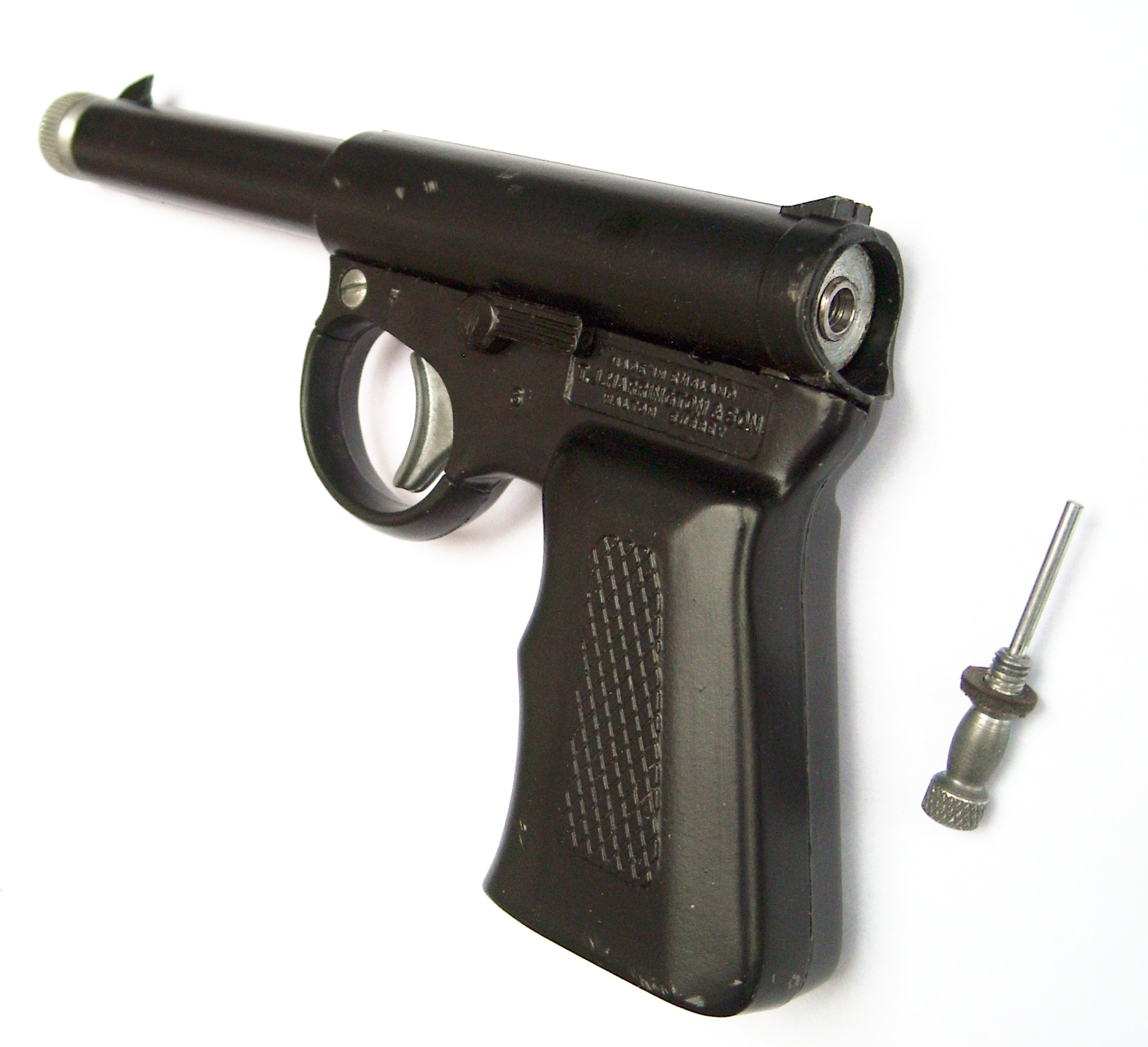
Breech open

The 'push barrel' operating mechanism of the Gat is simple and distinctive. The mechanism is an 1871 invention by Quakenbush.

A cocked Gat appears to have a fixed circular barrel protruding from a receiver that is also of roughly circular section. When fired, an inner section of the barrel, previously hidden, is driven forward by a spring and so the fired Gat then appears to have a three-section barrel (as illustrated). Cocking is performed by pushing this inner section back into the middle section. The middle 'barrel' is no more than a shroud over the operating spring and was not part of Quackenbush's original patent.

This forward-moving barrel has given rise to the view that the Gat is not an air weapon at all, but simply a spring catapult. This is incorrect. The piston is a leather seal around the outside of the inner barrel, running in a larger concentric cylinder within the receiver. The barrel and piston are driven forward when fired, air passing into the chamber from two small transfer ports drilled at the rear of the barrel, just ahead of the leather seal.

Loading is by a screw breech at the rear. The pellet is pushed far down the barrel by a long pin on this breech, until it is past the air port. If the breech pin is lost, the pistol cannot be loaded. A common replacement, given the nature of the pistol's users, was to replace the pin with another screw or other sort of extemporised plug. This does not work, the pellet in some cases even being fired backwards out of the breech.

The Gat is a low-power and inaccurate weapon. The moving barrel during firing did not improve accuracy. Gats were supplied with a mixture of dart, pellet and cork ammunition. It was least inaccurate with darts, having inadequate power to give a pellet sufficient velocity for accuracy. It was this inaccuracy that made the cork firing Gat a favourite with shooting gallery stall owners at travelling fairs.

A silver-coloured adapter screwed into the front of the barrel. This was used to fire bottle corks. Final versions of the Gat even included a plastic flyswatter that could be fired from this same adapter.

A similar mechanism, although with rather better build quality and wooden grips, was used for the German-made Hy-Score 814 pistol and Diana Model 2.

== Construction ==
The Gat was constructed cheaply and with little attempt at accuracy. Both frame and barrel were die-cast. In later years, plastic parts appeared in the trigger guard. Being die-cast rather than steel, the pistol was not blued but was painted black. A more expensive version was available in chrome plate, although these were rare.
