= Hat, Azerbaijan =

Hat
- Location within Azerbaijan
- Coordinates: 39°29′19″N 46°42′48″E
- Country: Azerbaijan
- Rayon: Qubadli
- Time zone: UTC+4 (AZT)
  - Summer (DST): UTC+5 (AZT)

Hat (also, Gat and Khat) is a village in the Qubadli Rayon of Azerbaijan. Hat is the Azeri village in Qubadli
