= Gát utca =

Coordinates: 47.47809°N 19.07719°E

Gát utca (Hungarian pronunciation: [ˈɡaːt ˈut͡sːɒ]) is a short quiet street off Haller utca in central Ferencváros, Budapest, Hungary. The street links Haller utca with Thaly Kálmán utca. Cross streets are Lenhossék utca, Márton utca and Sobieski János utca.

== Features ==
Gát utca is one of the most densely built-in streets in central Ferencváros. Property prices are low as most of the flats, predominantly council-owned, offer low comfort and need upgrading. The EU-funded plan called "József Attila terv" to sanitise and redevelop the area without destroying its social fabric is to go operational in the near future.

The street's most famous resident used to be József Attila, one of the most outstanding poets of 20th century Hungary. He was born in Gát utca 3 on 11 April 1905.

== Buildings of note ==
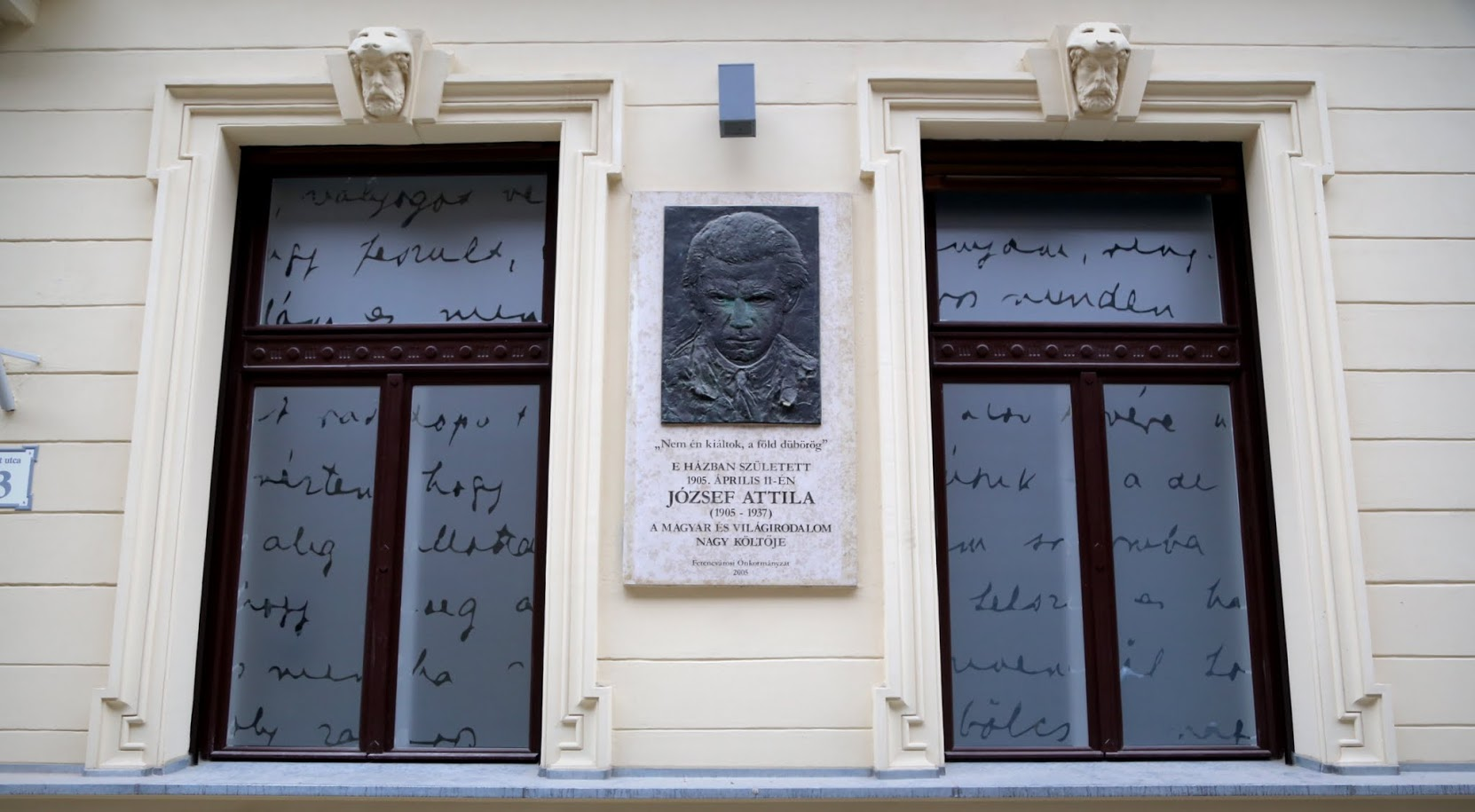
Birthplace of József Attila

- Gát utca 2 (former church, now school for pupils with special needs)
- Gát utca 3 (birthplace of József Attila, now a museum)
