= Glycine N-phenylacetyltransferase =

Identifiers
- EC no.: 2.3.1.192

Databases
- BRENDA: enzyme data
- ExPASy: NiceZyme view
- KEGG: enzyme entry
- MetaCyc: metabolic pathway
- Rhea: reactions
- PDB structures: RCSB PDB PDBe PDBsum
Search
- PMC: articles
- PubMed: articles
- NCBI: proteins

Glycine N-phenylacetyltransferase (EC 2.3.1.192, arylacetyl-CoA N-acyltransferase, arylacetyltransferase, GAT (gene)) is an enzyme with systematic name phenylacetyl-CoA:glycine N-phenylacetyltransferase. This enzyme catalyses the following chemical reaction

glycine
+
phenylacetyl-CoA
N-phenylacetylglycine
+ coenzyme A

This enzyme was characterised from bovine liver mitochondria.
