= Haller Park (Hungary) =

Park in Budapest, Hungary

Coordinates: 47.4752°N 19.0795°E

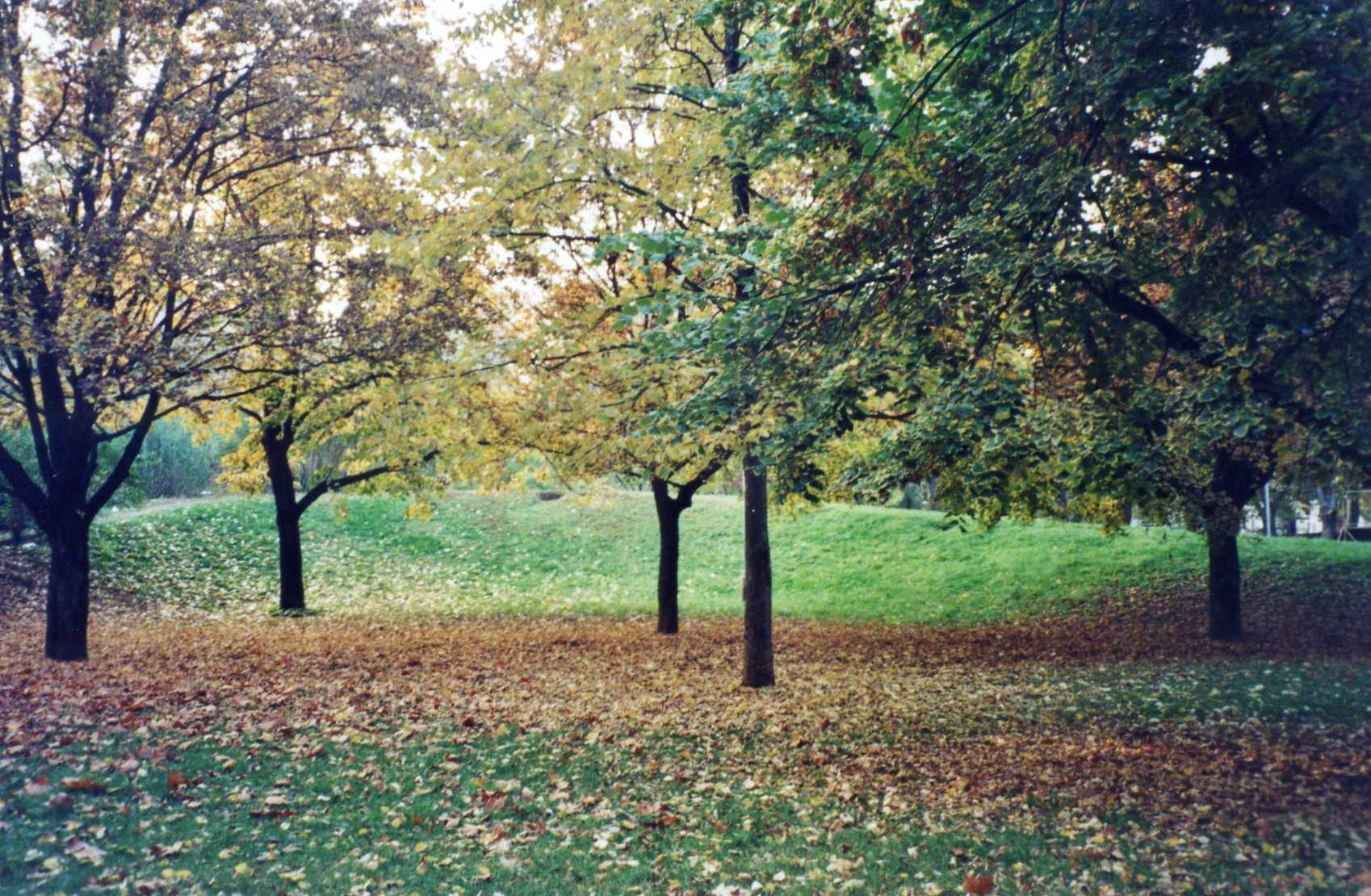
Haller park in October

Haller Park is the biggest park in mid-Ferencváros, the 9th district of Budapest, Hungary. It is bordered by Haller utca on the west, Mester utca on the south, Vágóhíd utca on the east, and Óbester utca on the north. As an integrated park, "well behaved" dogs are allowed roam off-leash.

== Facilities ==
The park has various recreational facilities including ballgame fields, well-designated fully EU-conforming playgrounds, a sledge hill and walkways for strolls. The park is particularly popular with families with children and old people.

Some residential buildings are dotted along its border, whereas a small one-storey nursery school and a creche occupy some space in the north of the park.

As a response to public concern, a park guard system went operational in May 2008.

== Flora and fauna ==
Haller Park has numerous tree species: chestnuts, poplars, black poplars, willows, lindens, yews and planes. Birds abound, too: blackbirds, tits, Eurasian blue tits, robins, magpies, pigeons, sparrows and crows. Hedgehogs and squirrels can be seen quite infrequently.
