= Gats (surname) =

Gats is a surname. Notable people with the surname include:

- Carlos Gats (born 1969), Argentinian Olympic sprint runner
