= Chŏngjagwan =

Korean traditional hat for men

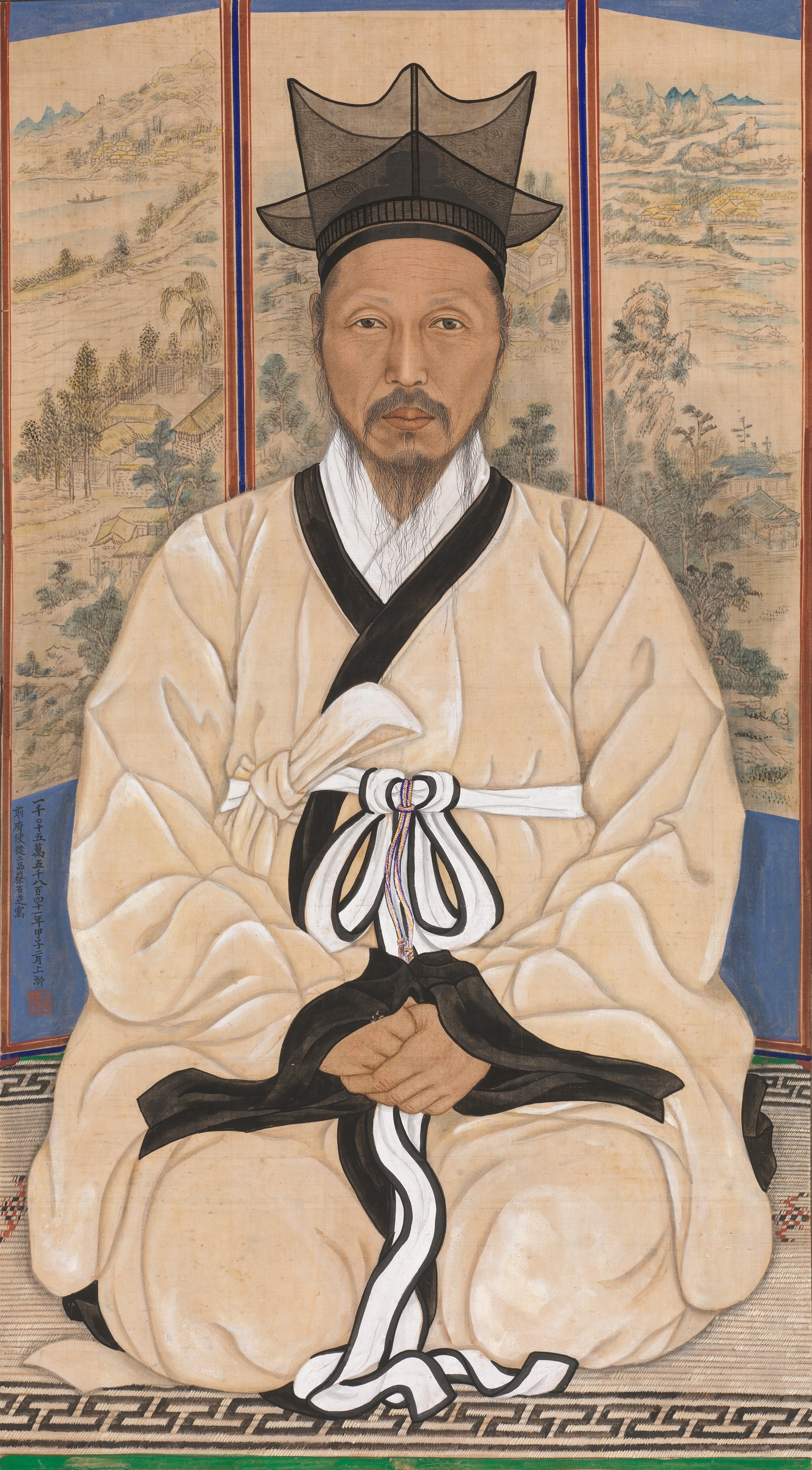
- Chŏngjagwan worn by Yong-Shin Chae, a Philosopher of the late Joseon Dynasty

Korean name
- Hangul: 정자관
- Hanja: 程子冠
- RR: jeongjagwan
- MR: chŏngjagwan

Chengziguan , or Chŏngjagwan (Korean: 정자관; Hanja: 程子冠) is a type of Guanmao or Kwanmo (관모; 冠帽). It is a Chinese and Korean traditional men's hat in Hanbok. It was first seen in the Five Dynasties period at the latest. In the Song Dynasty, two notable Confucian scholars, Cheng Yi and Cheng Hao, often wore this kind of hat, so they were also known as Cheng hats (程子冠). The system of chŏngjagwan is slightly modified following the barrel-shaped dongpo hat of the Song Dynasty. It is mainly woven with horsetail hair, and it was a hat worn by men from the yangban, the upper class of the Joseon period. It was mostly worn at home as a daily headgear instead of a gat, a formal headgear. Chŏngjagwan is made with horse hair.

== See also ==
- Gat
- Ayam
- Hanbok
