= Gat (surname) =

Gat or Gát is a surname that may refer to

- Azar Gat (born 1959), an Israeli researcher and author on military history
- Eliahu Gat (1919–1987), an Israeli landscape painter
- Emanuel Gat (born 1969), an Israeli choreographer of contemporary dance
- György Gát (born 1947), a Hungarian television director and producer
- Johnny Gat, a major character in the Saints Row video game series
- Yonatan Gat (born 1982), Israeli guitarist, composer and improviser
