= Sangtu (topknot) =

Traditional Korean men's hairstyle

The sangtu (Korean: 상투) was a Korean topknot hairstyle worn by married men.

The hairstyle was widely worn from around the 57 BC – 668 AD Three Kingdoms of Korea period until the late 19th century, during the Joseon period. Its practice in Korea has since virtually ceased.

By the Joseon period, the haircut was seen as essential for a man's honor. As Korea attempted to Westernize in the late 19th century, efforts to ban the haircut were fiercely resisted.

== History ==
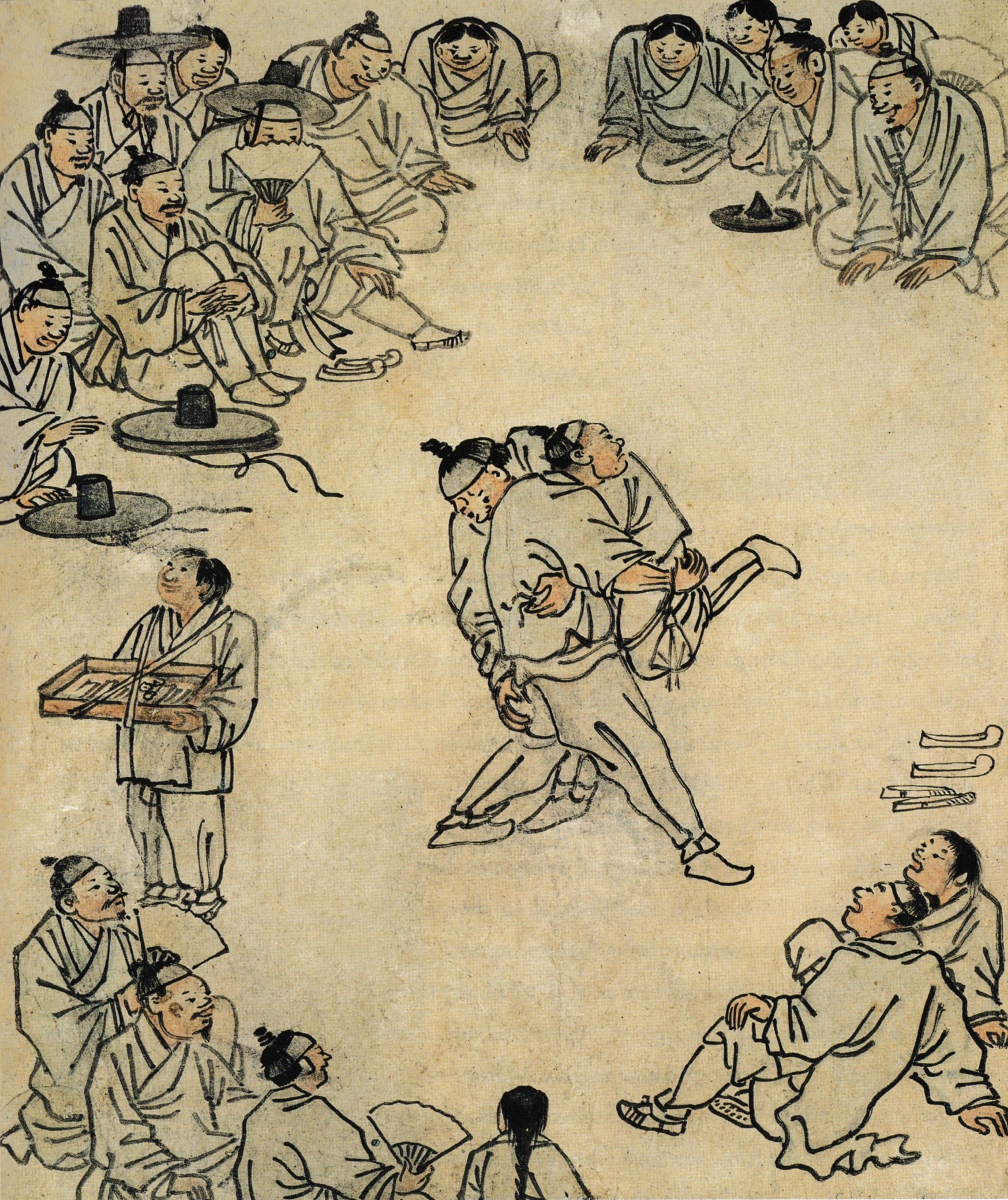
Men can be seen wearing sangtu in this c. 1780 painting by Kim Hong-do

The hairstyle is presumed to have been common during the 57 BC – 668 AD Three Kingdoms period. It is depicted in tomb murals of Goguryeo and in equestrian figures on pottery from Silla. There is reportedly no known evidence of its wearing in Baekje, although it is still assumed to have been common there. Depictions in this period had topknots of varying sizes and shapes. Merchants are depicted with larger ones and not wearing hats, while officials who wore hats wore smaller ones. The nobility were generally depicted as wearing topknots.

In a 12th century Song dynasty record called Koryŏ togyŏng, it is reported that the citizens of Goryeo, from the king down to the common people, wore hats that were typically worn over topknots. In 1278, by order of King Chungnyeol, officials wore a Mongolian-style queue haircuts tied at the back of the head, leaving only the hair on the top of the head. However, under King Gongmin, during whose reign the Mongol Yuan Dynasty was overthrown in China, topknots were again worn following the newly established Ming Dynasty. During the Joseon Dynasty, the use of topknots can be seen in both portraits and genre paintings.

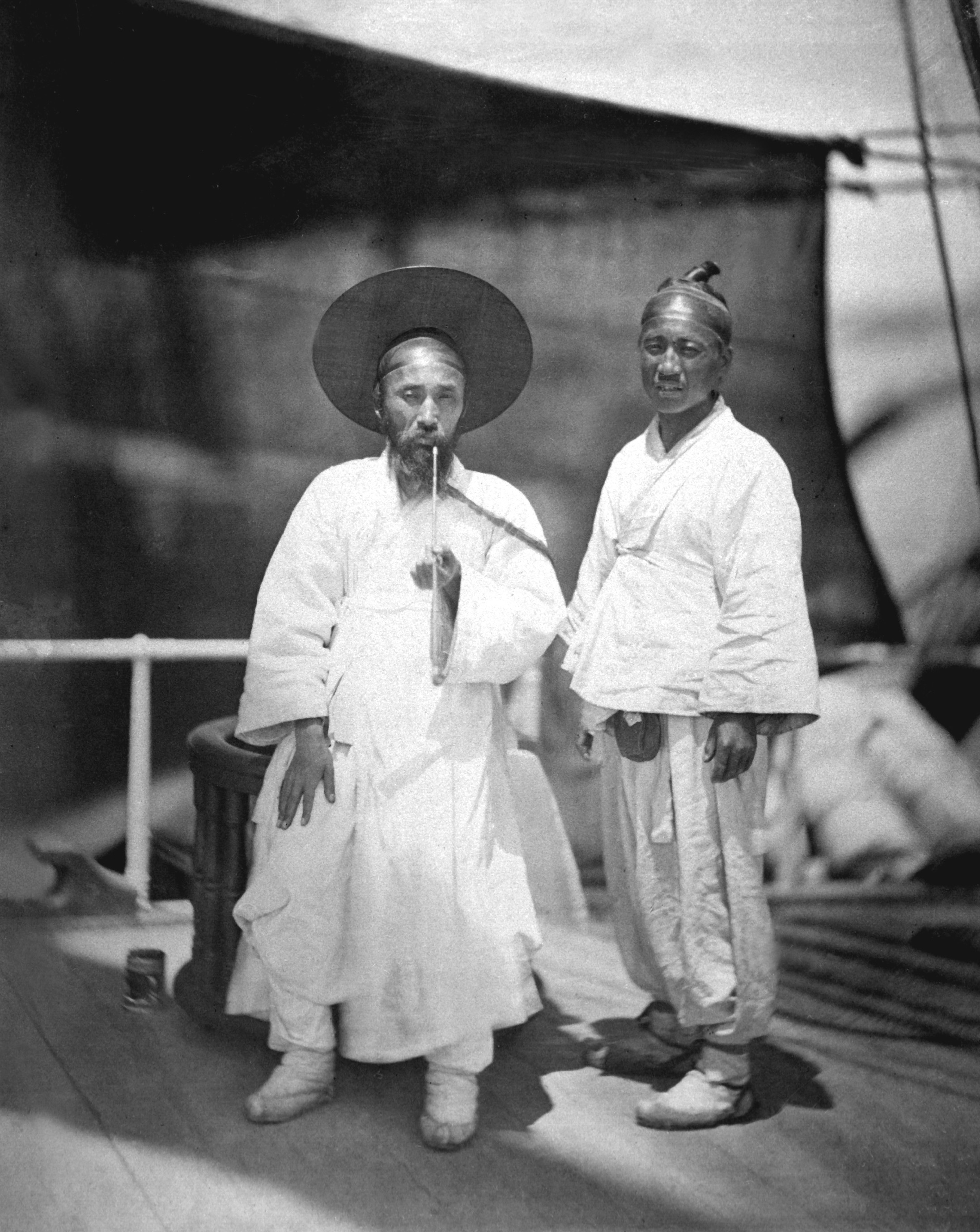
Korean officials during the United States expedition to Korea; the one on the right has a sangtu visible (1871)

To create a sangtu, the hair on the crown of the head was shaved and the remaining hair combed up. This was to dissipate heat because without shaving, the heat became unbearable. There was discrimination between married people and unmarried people: thus even young children who got married were treated as adults with a topknot, and unmarried people, even if they were older, were treated with contempt. People unable to be married (due to a poor family background or a physical defect) whether or not they were old, used to receive negative comments. To avoid this, men sometimes wore topknots to make it appear they were married.

"No matter how old one is, without a top-knot he is never considered a man, addressed with high endings, or treated with respect. After assuming the top-knot, no matter how young, he is invested with the dignities and duties of a man of the family, takes his share in making the offerings and prayers at the ancestral shrines, and is recognized by his ancestors' spirits as one of the family who is to do them honor, and whom they are to protect and bless."

=== Decline ===
Under the Eulmi reforms of 1895, the Short Hair Ordinance was issued, banning topknots. King Gojong's topknot was removed on December 30, 1895, two days before the reform came into effect.

Before a small audience of Korean and Japanese officials, a Japanese barber (no Korean could be found willing to undertake such a distasteful act) removed the king's top-knot. Despite the audience having been warned that any outburst of protest would be dealt with severely (fatally), many began to weep and protest, but their efforts were in vain.

Cutting the topknot was seen a mechanism for emasculating Korean men. Koreans in Mexico in the early 20th century, who were pressed into functional indentured servitude to Mexican masters, had their sangtu forcibly cut off.

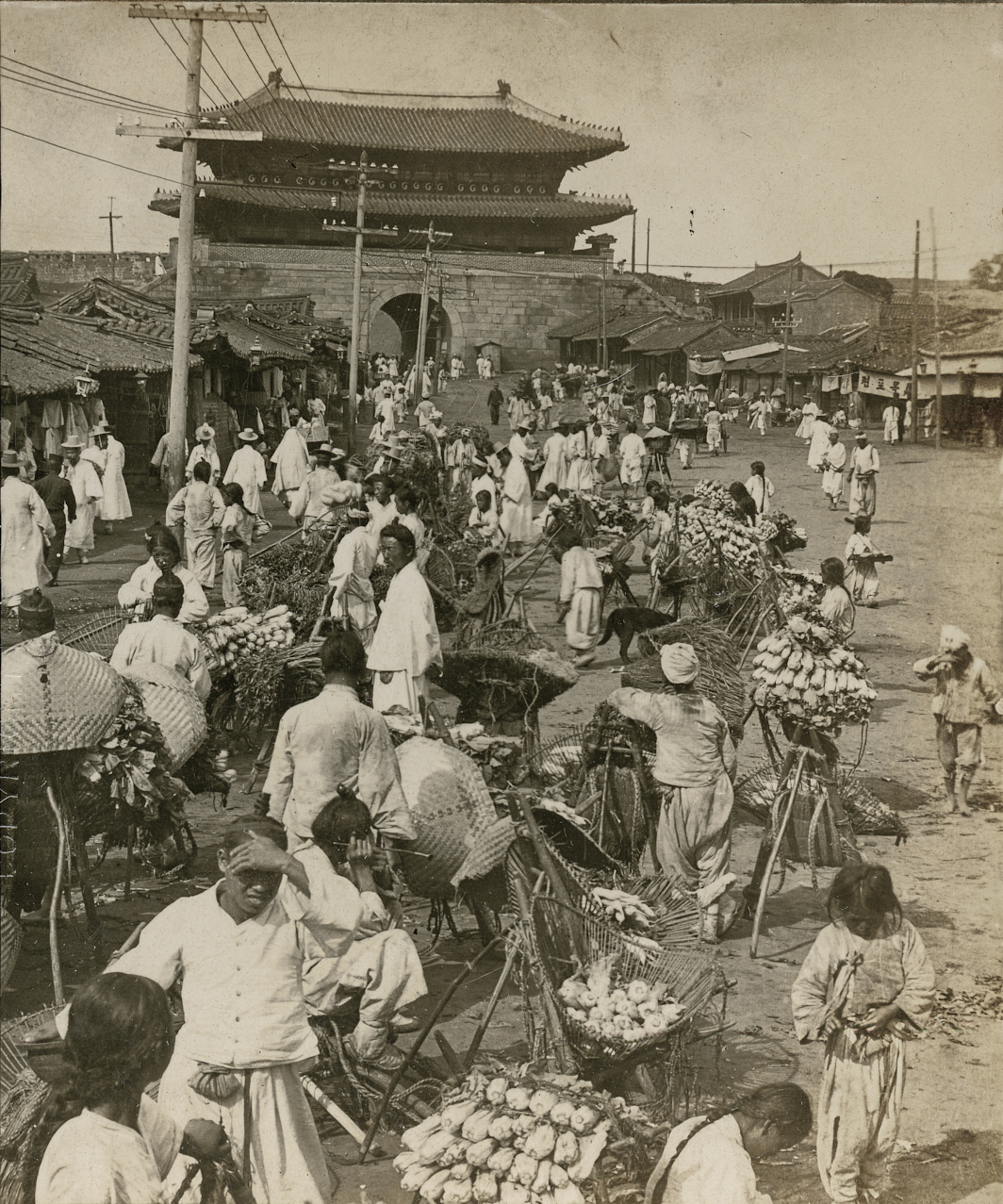
Sangtu visible in this predecessor to Namdaemun Market (1904)

Seoul residents had their topknots forcibly shorn. However, outside the city gates, men kept theirs. This resulted in merchants and porters refusing to enter the city. With worsening weather, supplies of wood and rice dwindled and prices soared. Hence, after about two weeks a further edict was issued, proclaiming haircutting to be no longer compulsory ("rather than have the citizens freeze or starve"). This created problems for those who no longer had topknots, because they could not go beyond the city for fear of being attacked by the more rural population.
