= Gat (hat) =

Traditional men's hat of Korea

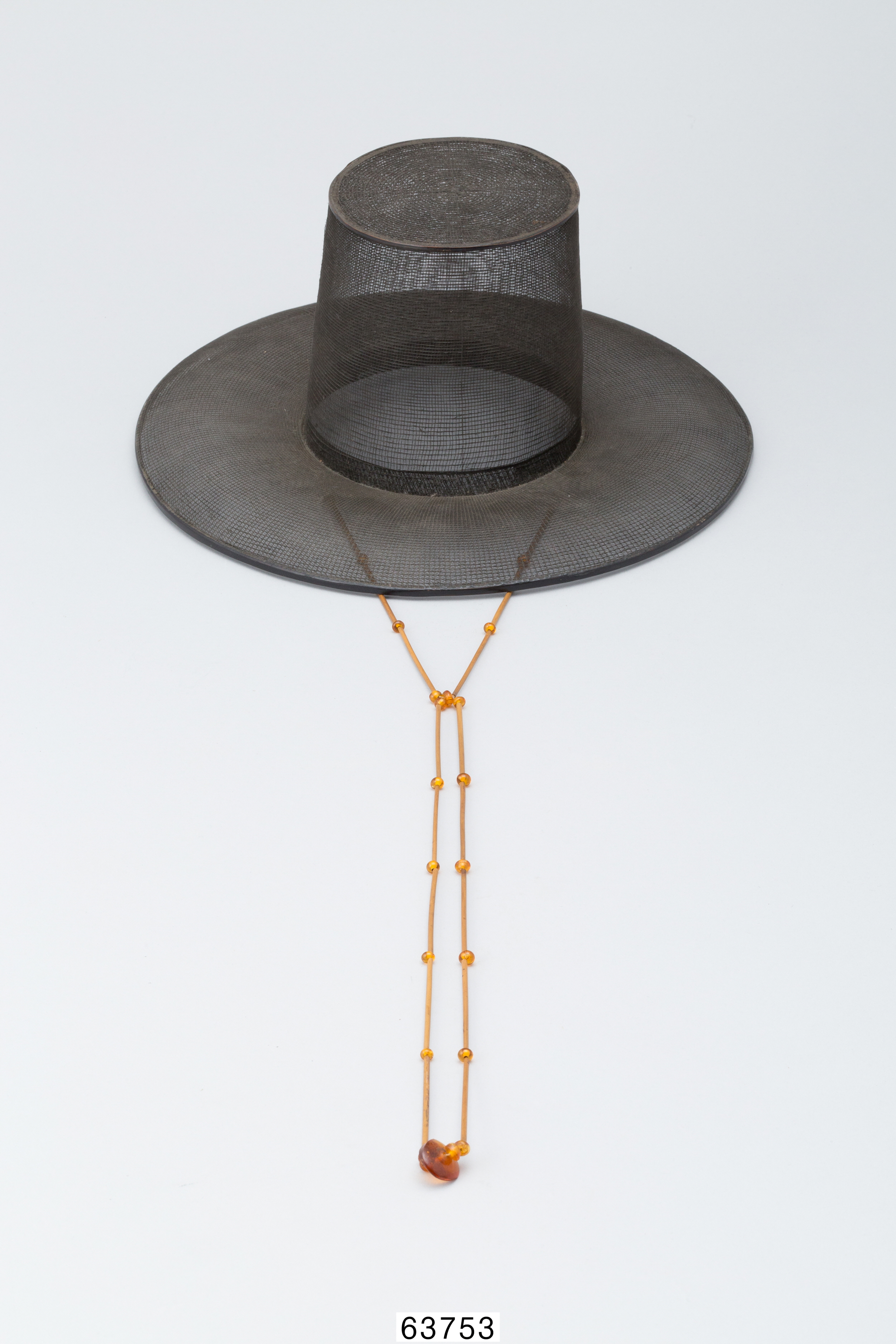

Korean name
- Hangul: 갓
- RR: gat
- MR: kat

A gat (Korean: 갓; pronounced [kat̚]) is a Korean traditional hat worn by men along with hanbok (Korean traditional clothing) during the Joseon period. It is made from bamboo or horsehair with a bamboo frame and is partly transparent.

Most gat are cylindrical in shape with a wide brim on a bamboo frame. Before the late 19th century, only noble class men could wear gat, which represented their social status and protected topknots.

Artisans who make gat are called ganniljang (갓일장), from gannil (갓일, a compound of two words gat and il (work); "gat making") + jang (장; 匠 "artisan, craftsperson, master of a craft"). As gannil requires artisanship throughout a complex series of techniques involving an array of materials, it has been designated as Intangible Cultural Property No. 4 on December 24, 1964.

== History ==
The origins of gat date back to ancient times. Usually, the following hats are considered to be the first specimens of what is known as gat today: the so-called iphyeong baekhwa pimo (입형백화피모; 笠形白樺皮帽) from Geumnyeongchong (금령총; 金鈴塚), an ancient Silla tomb located in Gyeongju, and the pan-shaped gat which is distinct from ordinary hats in pattern and shape and is depicted on the murals of the Gamsinchong (감신총; 龕神塚), an ancient Goguryeo tomb. Even in the modern era, the hat was worn commonly by elders and rural peoples until the late 20th century.

== Colors and types ==
Colors and types of gat were differentiated by circumstances and/or social status.

During the Joseon period, black gat (흑립; 黑笠; heungnip) was restricted to men who had passed the gwageo, or civil service examinations. In narrow definition, the term gat refers to the heungnip.

A white gat (백립; 白笠; baengnip) was worn during times of national mourning. It is crafted in the same manner as a black gat but from sambe (hemp), consistent with traditional Korean hempen mourning garb.

A red gat (주립; 朱笠; jurip) was worn by military officers of Joseon. Its color comes from red lacquer.

Commoners wore a variant called paeraengi (패랭이) which was woven from split bamboo.

== Gallery ==
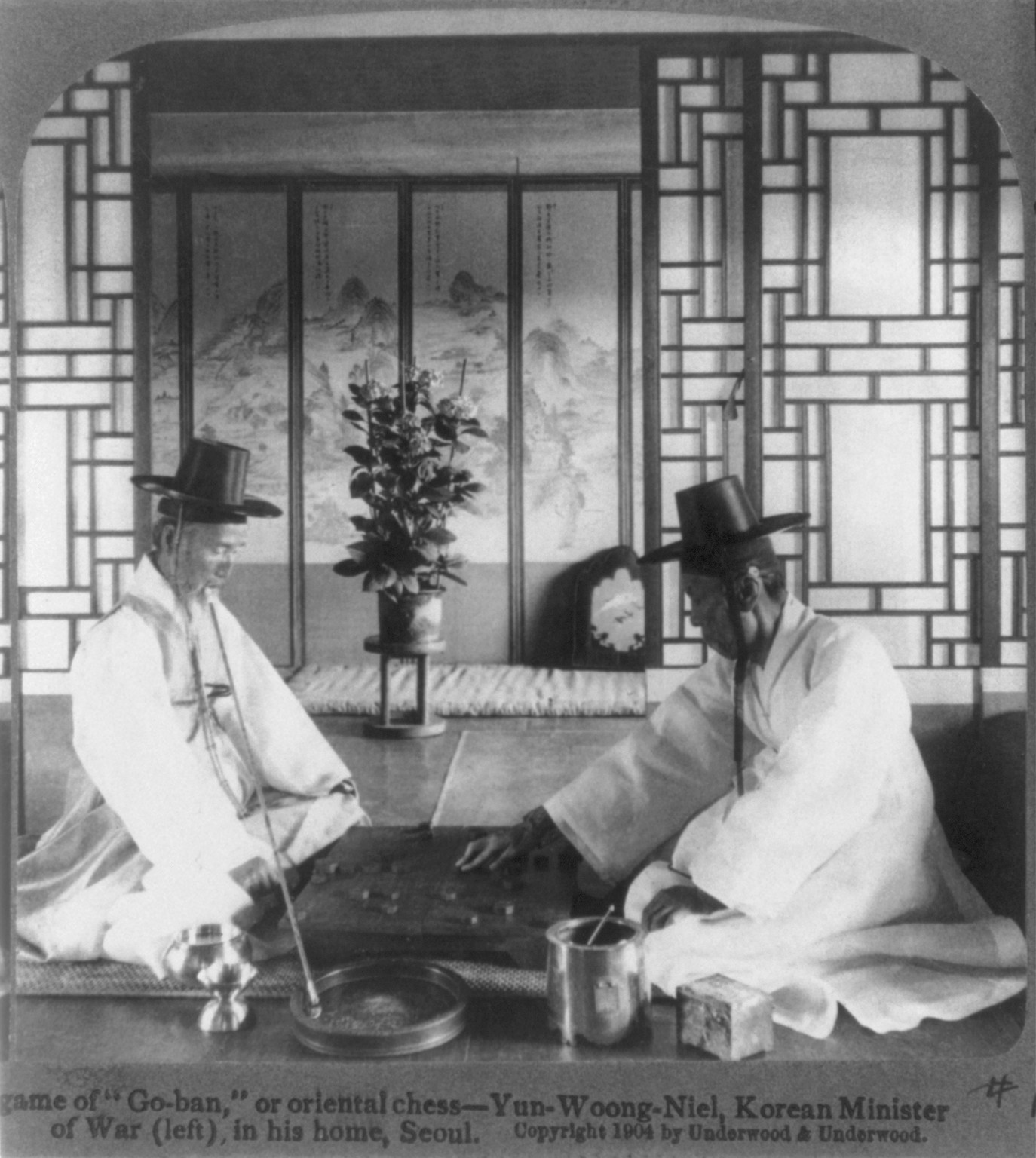

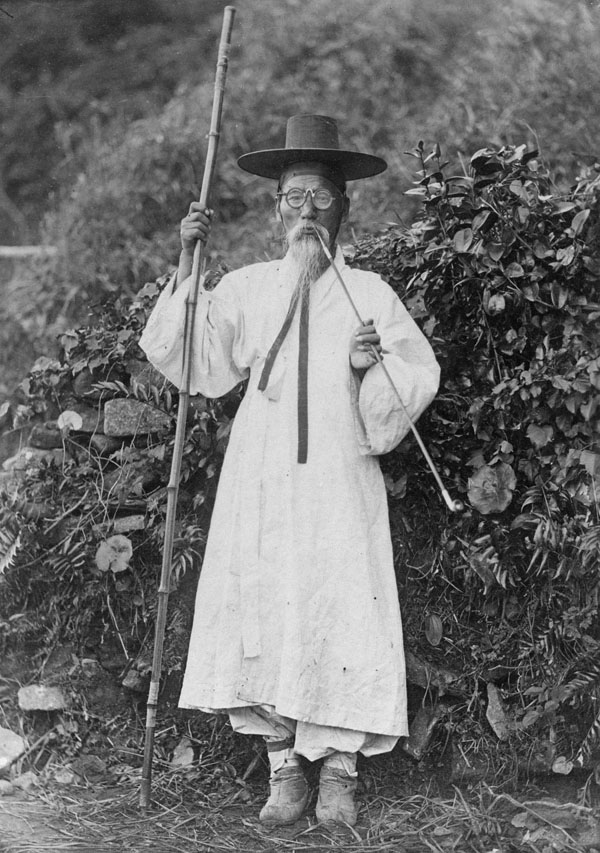

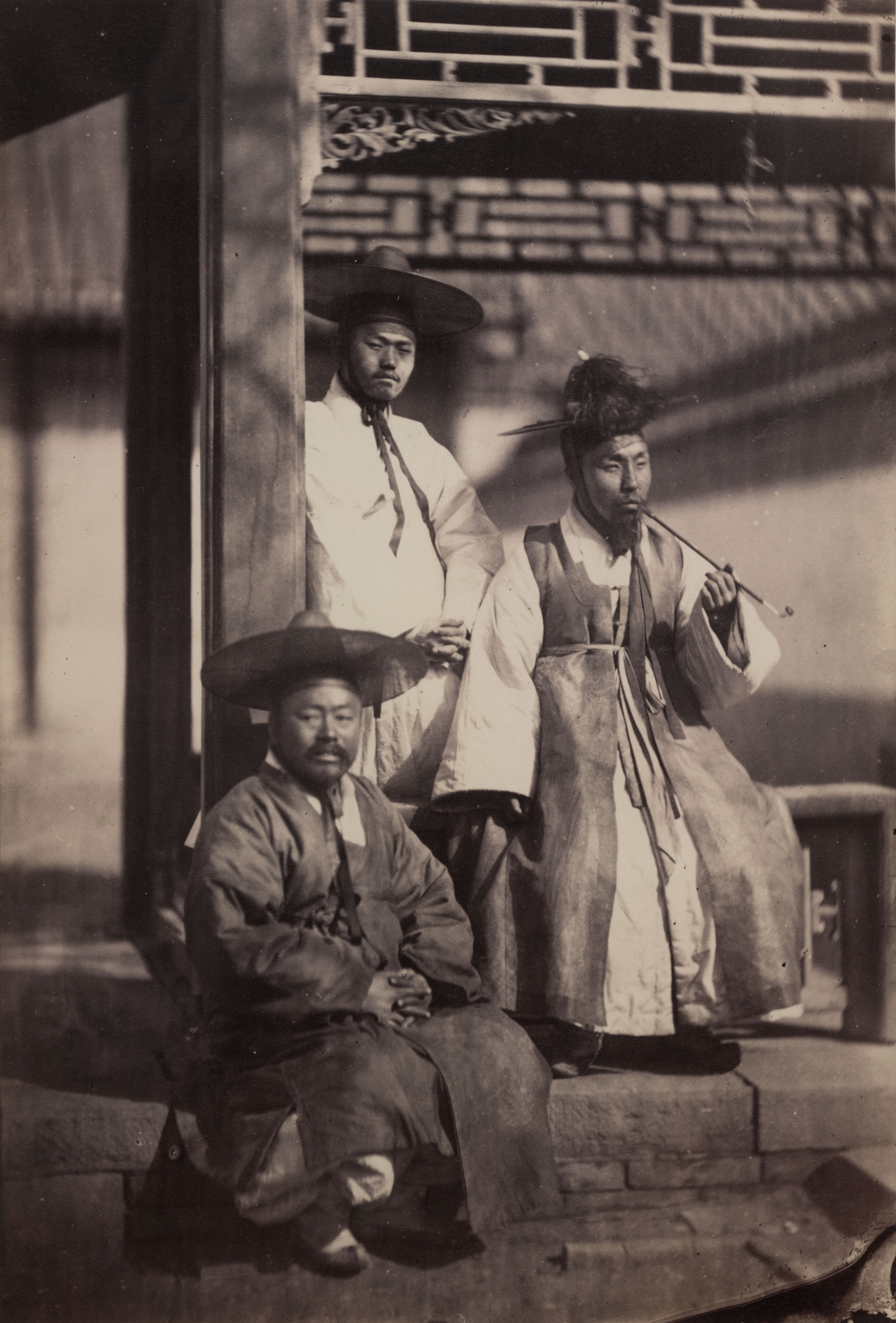

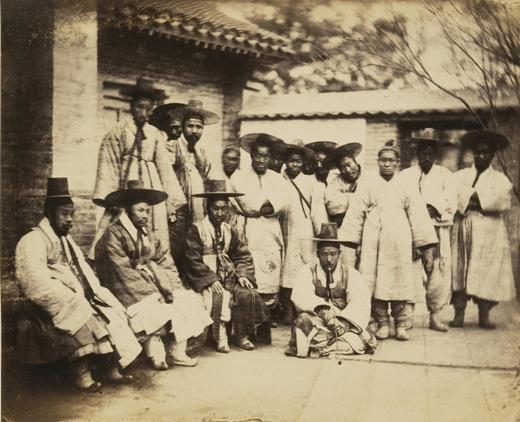

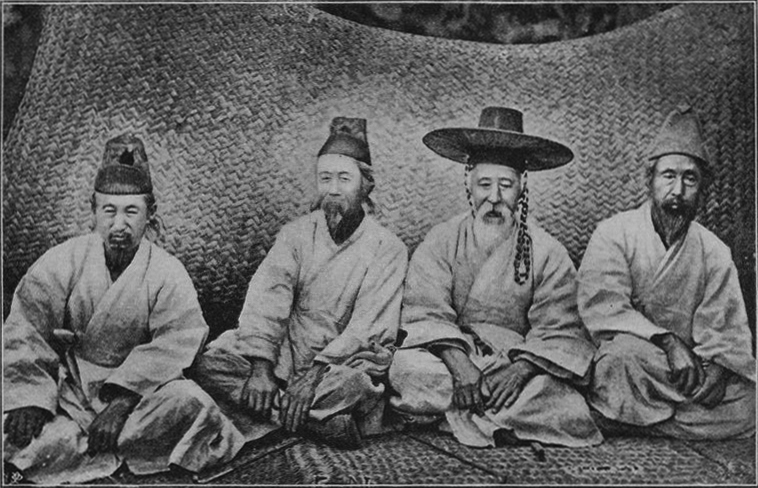

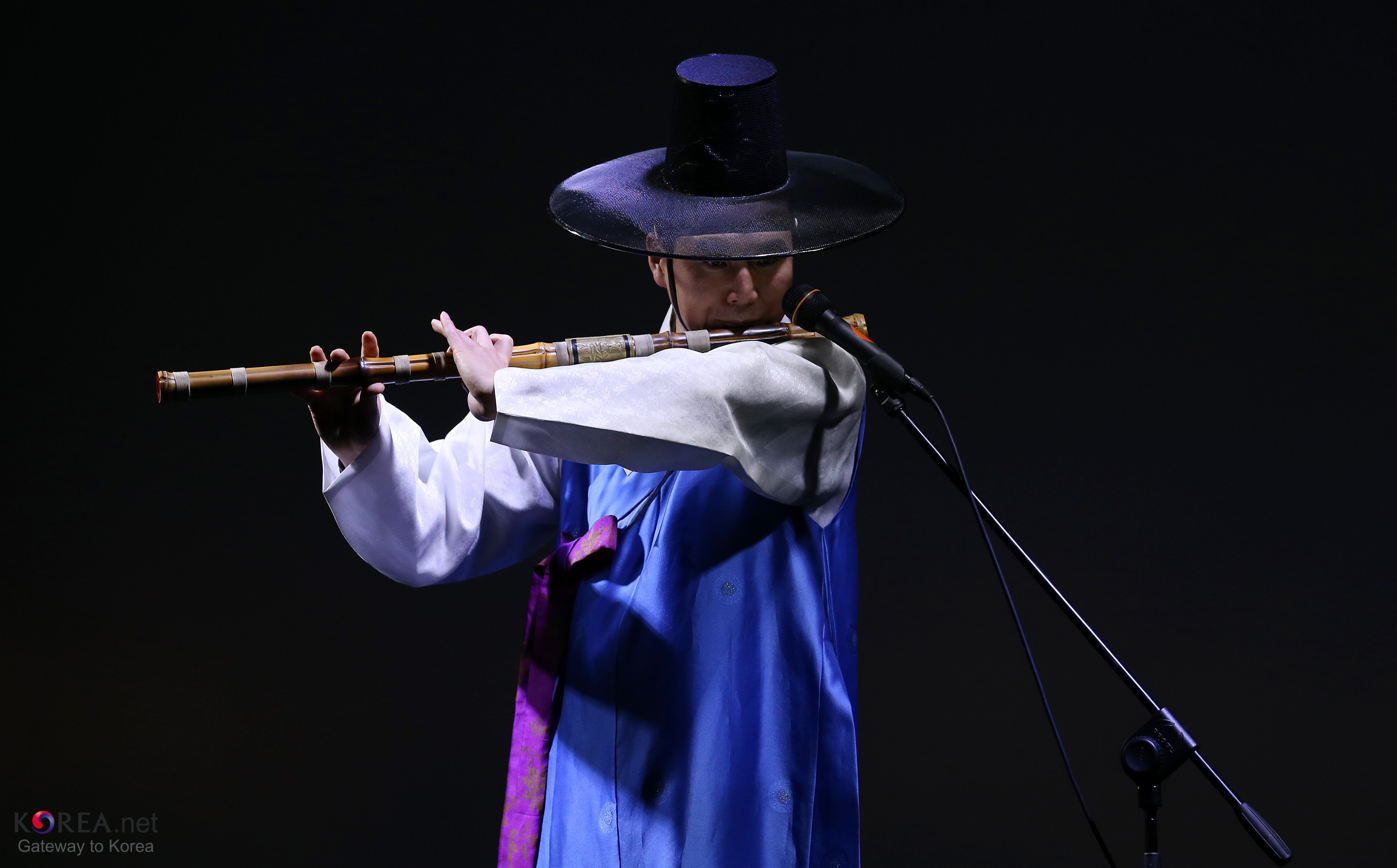
A musician wearing a gat and hanbok at a Hanbok Fashion Show, 2013

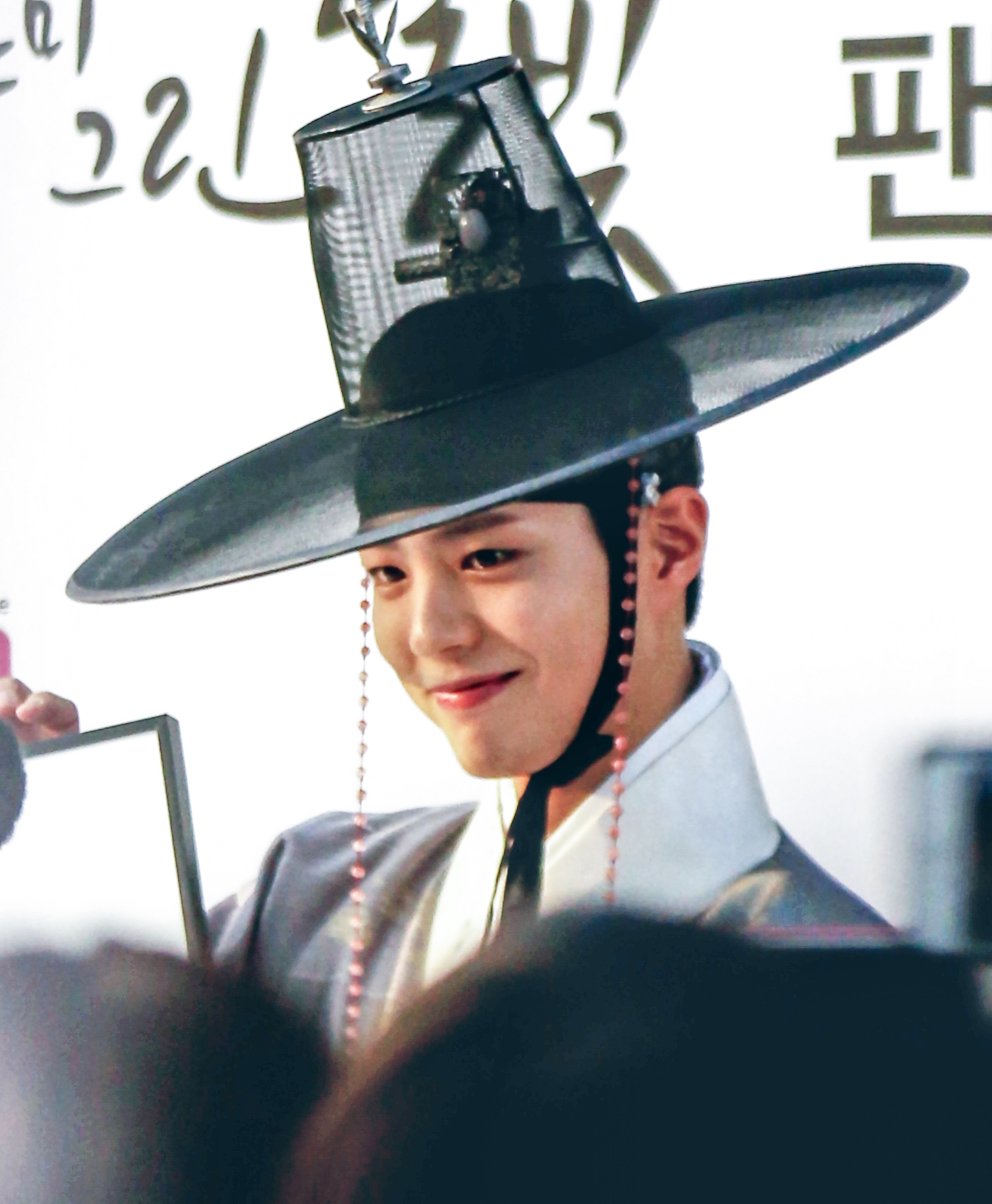
Actor Park Bo-gum wearing a gat and a hanbok for sageuk Love in the Moonlight (2016)

== See also ==
- List of hat styles
- Culture of Korea
- List of Korean clothing
