= Aeropark =

Aviation museum in Budapest, Hungary

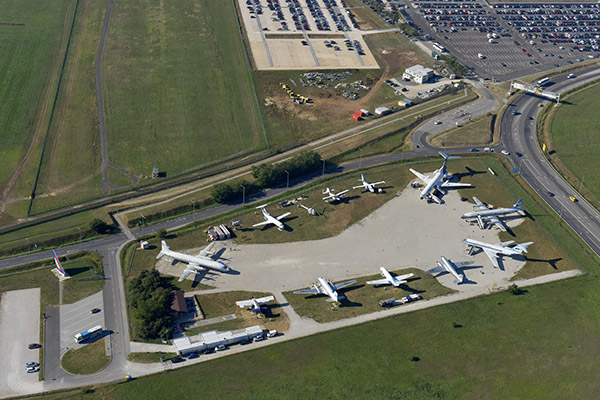
- The museum at its new location after the 2017 move
- Established: 1988
- Location: Budapest Ferenc Liszt International Airport, Terminal 2 Hungary
- Coordinates: 47.4240°N 19.2627°E
- Type: Aviation museum
- Public transit access: Bus route 200E
- Website: http://www.aeropark.hu

Aeropark is an open-air aviation museum next to Ferenc Liszt International Airport, Budapest, Hungary. It is dedicated to the history of Hungarian civil aviation, featuring several types used by the now-defunct national airline Malév.

Aeropark also has a flight simulator for visitors and a gift shop with plane models and various Malév-memorabilia. Most of the planes of Aeropark are accessible for visitors with wheelchairs. Aeropark is a regular participant in the annual event Long Night of Museums.

== History ==
The history of Aeropark (originally Ferihegy Aircraft Park; Ferenc Liszt Airport was named Ferihegy International Airport then) goes back to February 23, 1988 when Hungary received an Ilyushin Il-14T aircraft from the Soviet army, to be exhibited. István Veress, director general of the Hungarian Technical and Transportation Museum and Tamás Erdei, head of Aviation and Airport Directorate (LRI), announced the foundation of an aircraft museum. The three planes of the museum, the Il-14, an Ilyushin Il-18 and a Tupolev Tu-134 were originally placed in the airport proper, next to Malév's hangar.

Ferihegy Aircraft Park opened in 1991 in a new place, between runway 31L and the 2B terminal building; the three planes were towed to their new places in October, and a Tesla landing radar was added to the collection. The planes and other equipment became property of the Transportation Museum, while preserving and exhibiting them was done by LRI. The latter was divided into two companies (Budapest Airport and HungaroControl) in 2002. Neither LRI nor its successor Budapest Airport was able to expand the collection.

In 2003 Budapest Airport got rid of all its divisions which were not essential to running the airport itself, including the museum. It supported the creation of a foundation which took over the management of the museum. The Cultural Foundation for Ferihegy Aircraft Park managed the museum between 2004 and 2014, when it was taken over by a nonprofit organization named Aviation Cultural Center. The organization, founded in 2010, aims to preserve and exhibit aircraft and other mementoes of Hungarian aviation. The museum uses its current name, Aeropark since June 19, 2014.

In early 2017 the museum temporarily closed down while it was relocated to a nearby site. The move was necessitated by the expansion of the parking lot. Relocation started on March 23, the museum opened again in the beginning of June.

== The exhibition ==
=== Lisunov Li-2 (HA-LIQ) ===
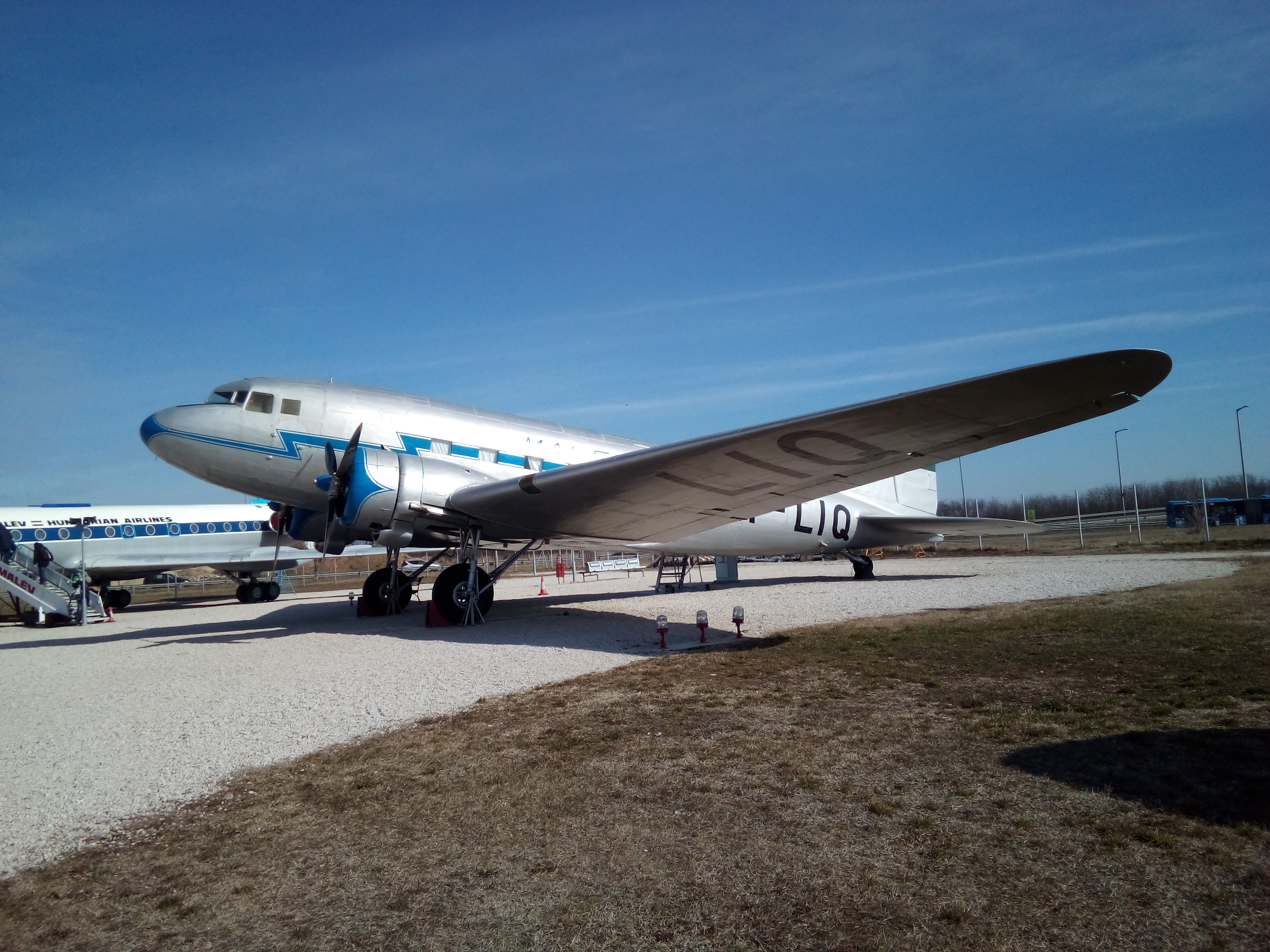
Li-2 HA-LIQ

Lisunov Li-2 played an important role in Hungarian aviation, as it was the first type of passenger aircraft operated by Maszovlet and then its successor Malév. HA-LIQ arrived in Hungary on March 27, 1952 where it was first owned by the Hungarian Air Force (1954-1957) then by Malév where it received a civilian registration mark but continued to use its green military livery. After 1958 Malév used it as a cargo aircraft. In 1964 Malév returned it to the army where it got its military registration number (206) back, and was used until 1974. Its total flight time is 3829 hours. After being written off, it was donated to the Transport Museum. It was restored in 1980 and stood in storage at Farkashegy Airport. It was moved to the aircraft museum in 1993. Its interior is completely restored, and can be visited during events.

=== Ilyushin Il-14T (HA-MAL) ===
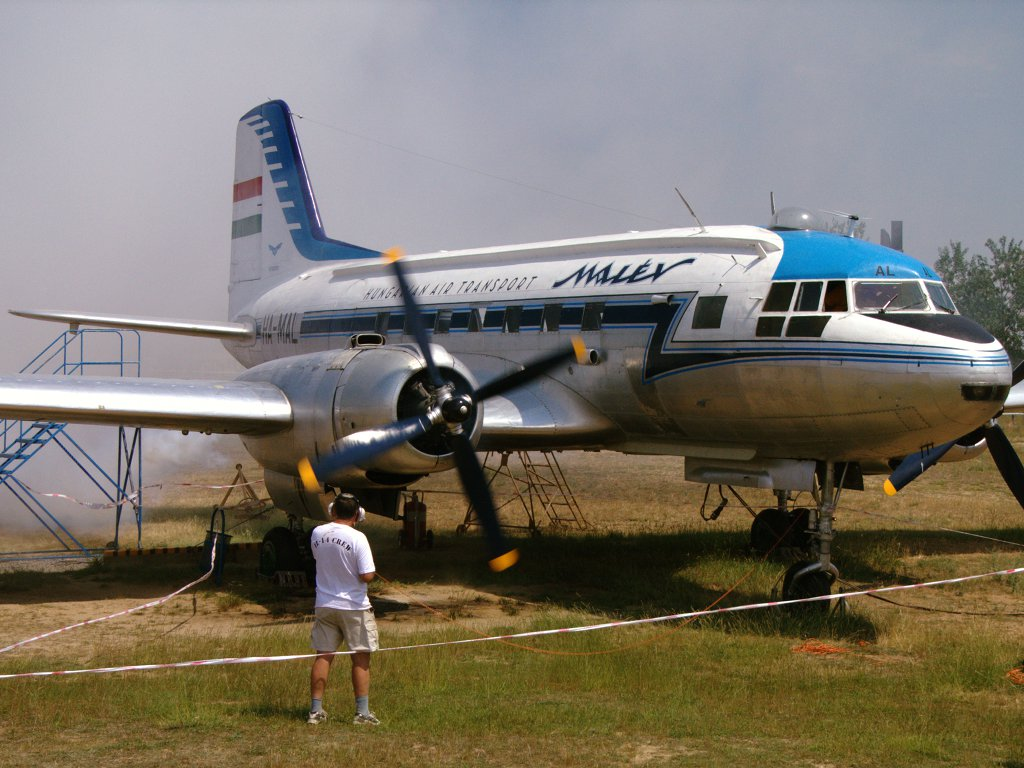
Il-14T HA-MAL

This Il-14 originally belonged to the 226th Independent Mixed Aviation Regiment, of the Southern Army Group of the Soviet Red Army. In 1981 it was withdrawn from service and stored for six years in Mirhorod (today in Ukraine), then in Tököl Airport, Hungary. In late 1987 it was flown to Ferihegy where it became the first plane of the newly founded aviation museum. Since then it was moved twice, in 1991 and in 2017, when the museum moved to a new place. Its total flight time is 5928 hours. In 2009-2010 it has been restored. Originally it was only planned to be repainted in period Malév livery (while this specific plane has never been owned by Malév, the airline had Il-14 planes in its fleet), but since the plane was in a very good condition even after 25 years of disuse, repairs were done on both engines and visitors can watch them being started once a month.

=== Ilyushin Il-18V (HA-MOA) ===
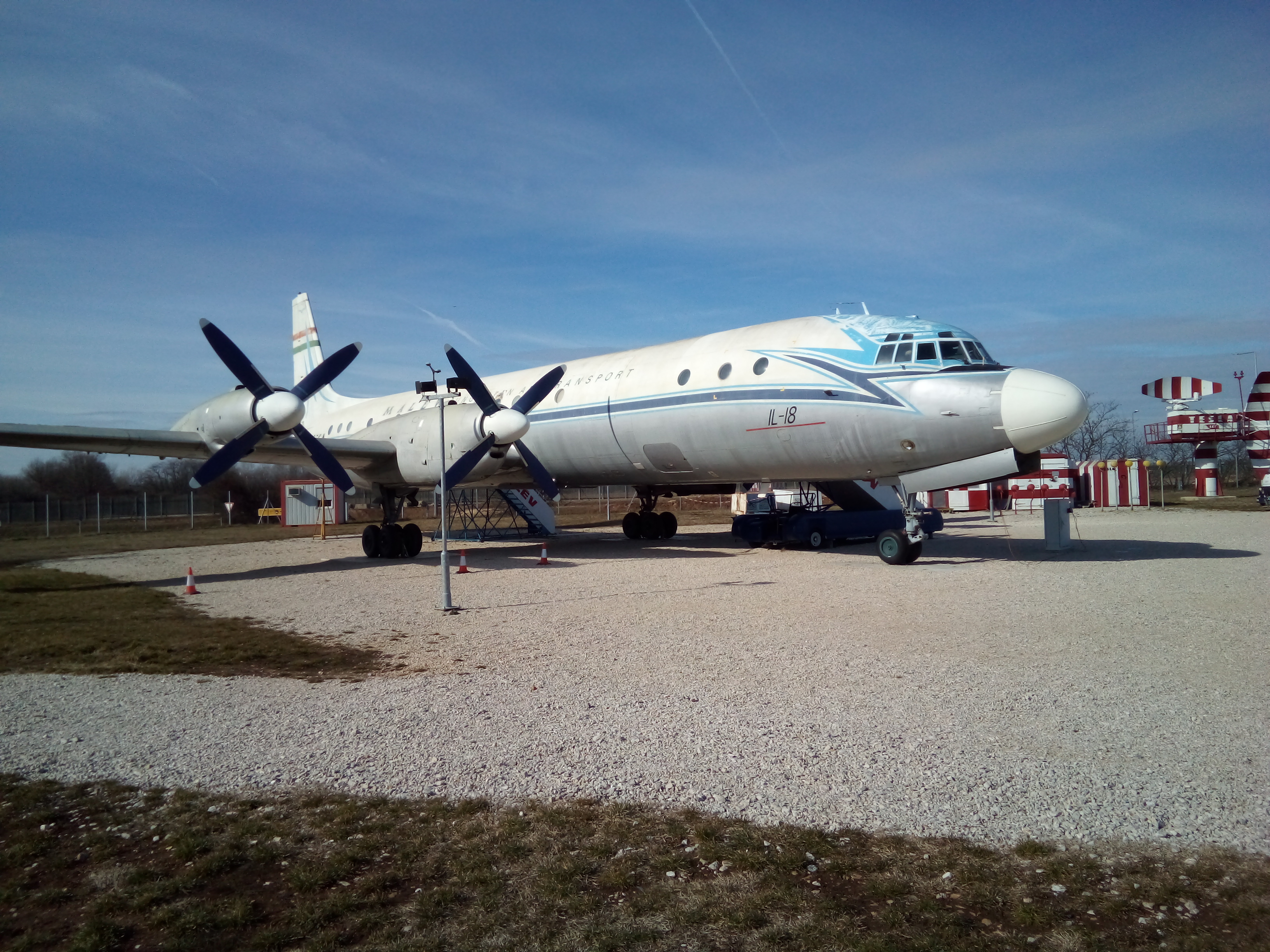
Il-18V HA-MOA

This Il-18 plane arrived in Hungary in 1960, and soon started to fly regular Malév routes, the first one to Moscow. It was subject to several overhauls which converted it into the more modern Il-18V variant. In 1964 it received a TG-16 auxiliary power unit, in 1968 its original engines were replaced by Ivchenko AI-20 engines, later this year it was reconfigured from an 89-seat plane into a 105-seat one. Its last flight as a passenger plane was from Prague to Budapest on April 1, 1977, exactly 17 years after its arrival in the fleet. It was converted into a cargo aircraft, was withdrawn from service in 1987 and given to the museum in October 1991, as one of the first three planes in its collection. Its total flight time is 37,197 hours. Its interior, including the cockpit, is open to visitors.

=== Ilyushin Il-18V (HA-MOG) ===
This Il-18V arrived in Hungary in 1964. Unlike the previous one, it was not an overhauled Il-18 but a newly built Il-18V. Its first passenger flight was to Moscow. In 1967 its original engines were replaced with AI-20K engines. Its last passenger flight was in late 1978 between Sofia and Budapest, then it was converted into a cargo aircraft. Its last cargo flight was in October 1988 between Constantine, Algeria and Budapest. The next day one of its engines was damaged by a fire and the plane, which was planned to be written off in December, was written off after the fire. Between 1993 and 2006 it was used by Malév for training. In 2006 a petition was started against the demolition of the plane, and it was moved to the aviation museum. Its exterior was restored in June 2014, but the interior continues to be in a bad condition. Its total flight time is 36,558 hours.

=== Tupolev Tu-134 (HA-LBE) ===
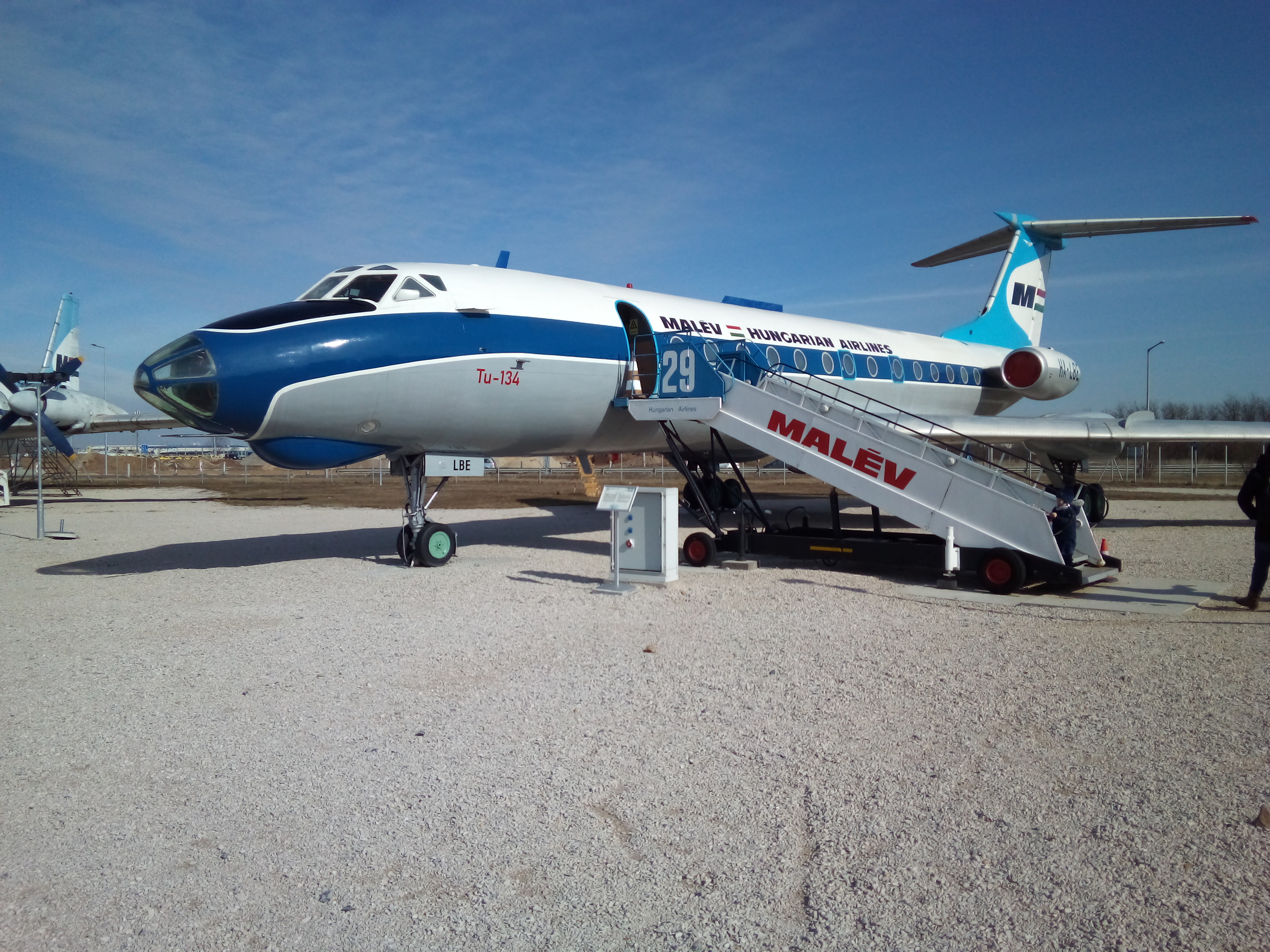
T-134 HA-LBE

This Tupolev Tu-134 arrived in Malév's fleet in 1969. Its first flight as a passenger plane was to Prague. In 1983, with the addition of a Comfort class the 72-seater plane was reconfigured as a 68-seater. Its last flight was from Warsaw-Okęcie Airport in 1987. In 1988 it was the first Tu-134 of Malév to be withdrawn from service; the next year it became one of the first three planes of the aviation museum. It is the oldest extant Tu-134 in Hungary, as the three older ones all perished in accidents. Its total flight time is 24,167 hours. Its interior, including the cockpit, can be visited.

=== Tupolev Tu-154B-2 (HA-LCG) ===
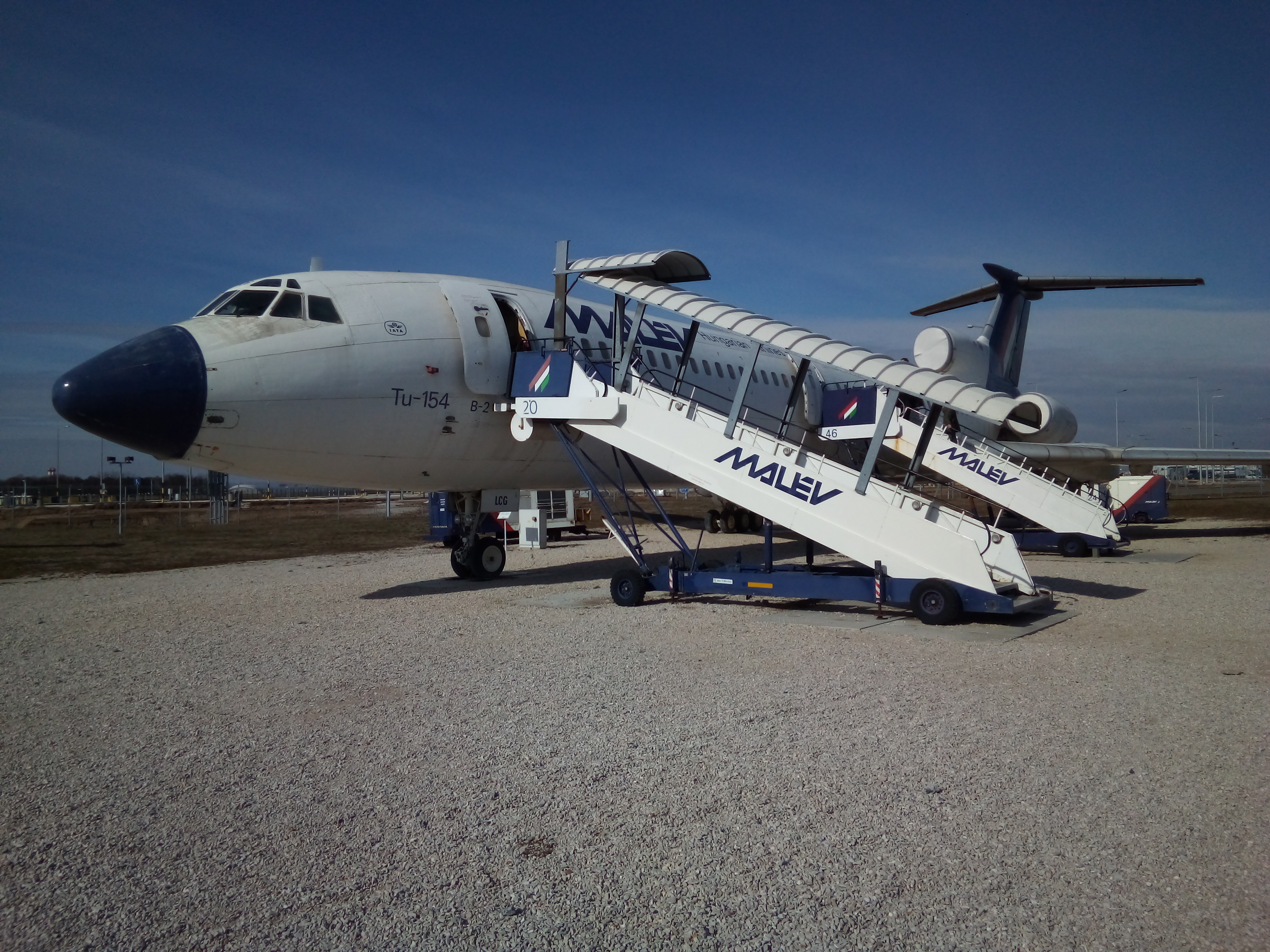
Tu-154B-2 HA-LCG

This Tupolev Tu-154B arrived in Malév's fleet in late 1975. In 1980 it went through an overhaul, and was converted into a CAT-II category aircraft (154B-2). In 1983, with the addition of a Comfort class it was reconfigured as a 143-seater. Its last flight was from Heraklion International Airport. It was towed to the aviation museum in 1994. Its total flight time is 21,554 hours. Its interior, including the cockpit, can be visited.

=== Yakovlev Yak–40E (HA-YLR) ===
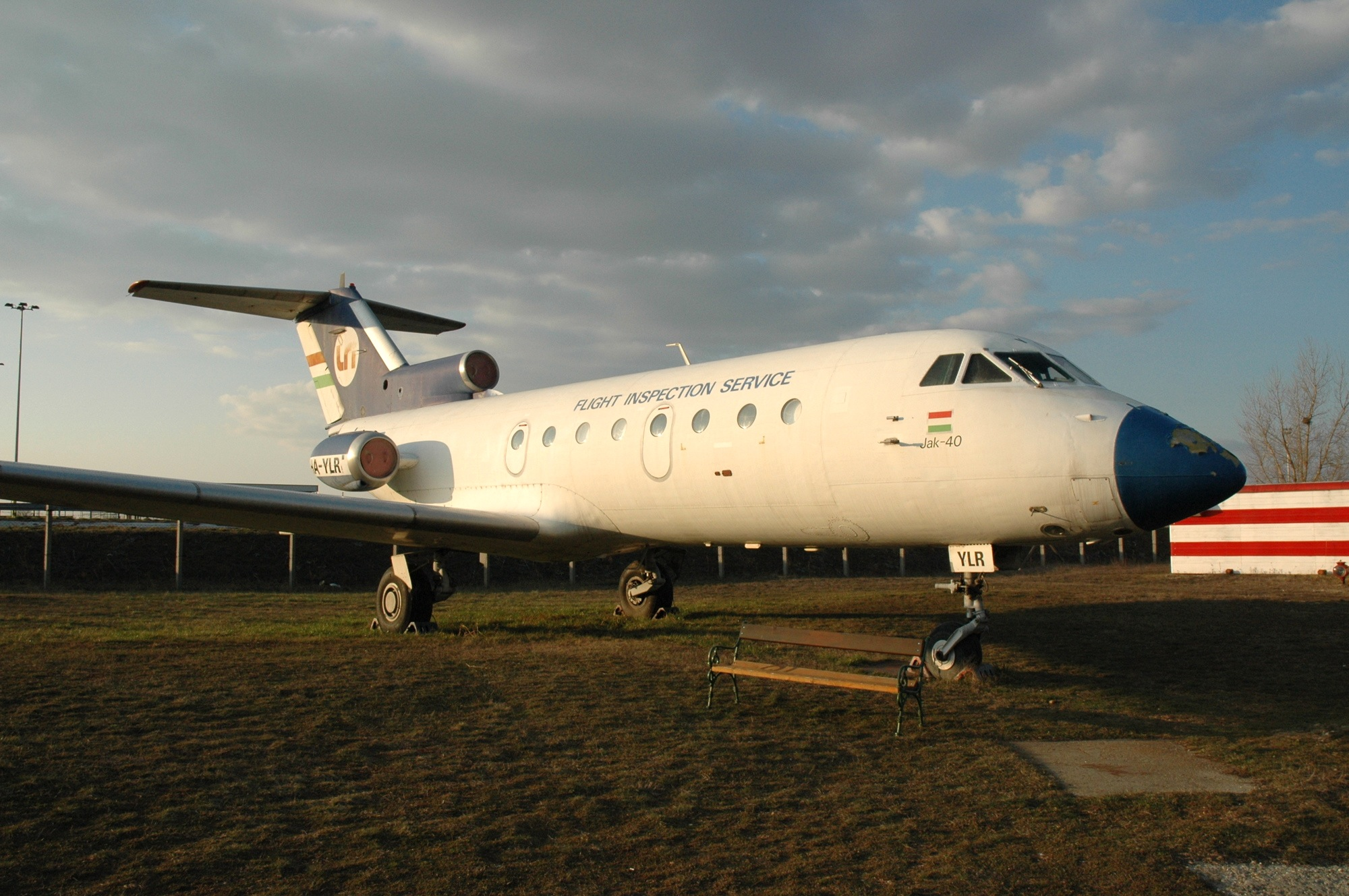
Yak-40 HA-YLR

This Yakovlev Yak-40 plane arrived in Hungary in late 1975. It was ordered by LRI and was used to test and authenticate navigation equipment both in Hungary and abroad. It has never flown as a passenger aircraft. In 1987 it was repainted in the same livery as the Tu-134; it was painted in its current livery in 1993. In 2001 it was towed to the aviation museum. The plane is airworthy, in an excellent condition. Its interior can be visited during events.

=== Yakovlev Yak–40E (HA-LRA) ===
This Yakovlev Yak–40 aircraft arrived to Hungary in 1990, having previously flown in Czechoslovakia under the registration OK-EED. Between 1990 and 2001 it flew under the colours of Aviaexpress, then a partner of Malév. It was later retired. The interior is also available to view.

=== Antonov An-2M (HA-MHI) ===
This Antonov An-2 arrived in Hungary in late 1967 and was used as an agricultural aircraft. It was withdrawn from service and given to the aviation museum in 1994 where it was restored in 2005. This plane can only be viewed from outside.

=== Mil Mi–2 (HA-BCB) ===
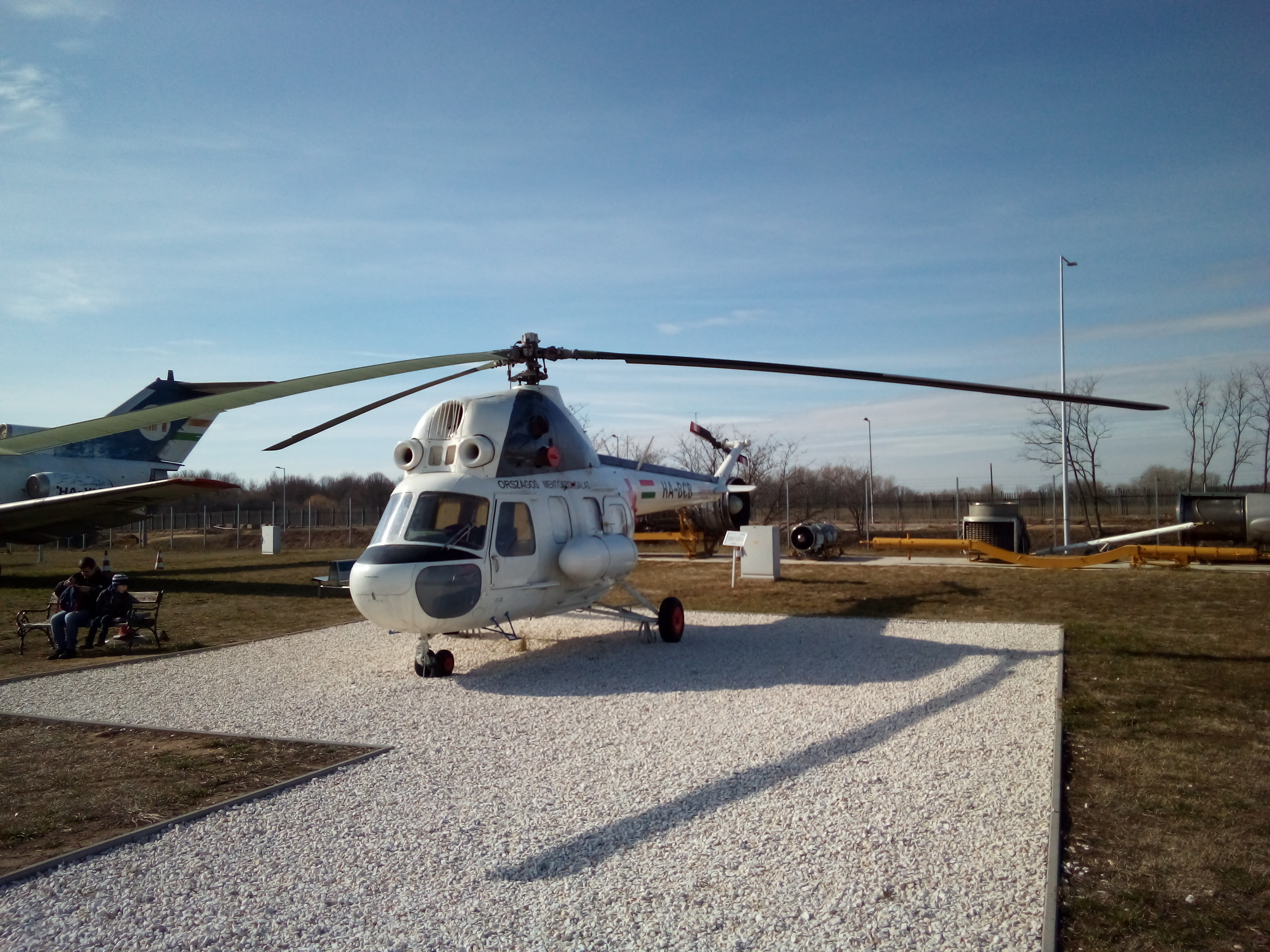
Mil Mi-2 HA-BCB

This Mil Mi-2 helicopter was used by the Hungarian Air Ambulance from January 1980. Until 1994 it was stationed in Székesfehérvár; in August 1994 it was flown to Ferihegy for repairs, but due to a lack of funds it was withdrawn from service. Its total flight time is 2841. It was towed to the aviation museum in 1999. The helicopter can only be viewed from outside.

=== Antonov An-2R (HA-YHF) ===
This Antonov An-2 was made in Poland in 1979 and delivered to Hungary in the same year. Its first registration mark was HA-MDK, it was used for agricultural duties. It was withdrawn from service in 1995 and was displayed in the car park of a McDonald's restaurant in District XVIII, Budapest.. After the closure of the restaurant in 2014, the aircraft was transported to Aeropark, where it was painted in the colours of the former An-2 aircraft of the Malév Aero Club. Its interior, including the cockpit, can be visited.

=== Let L-410 Turbolet (HA-LAF) ===
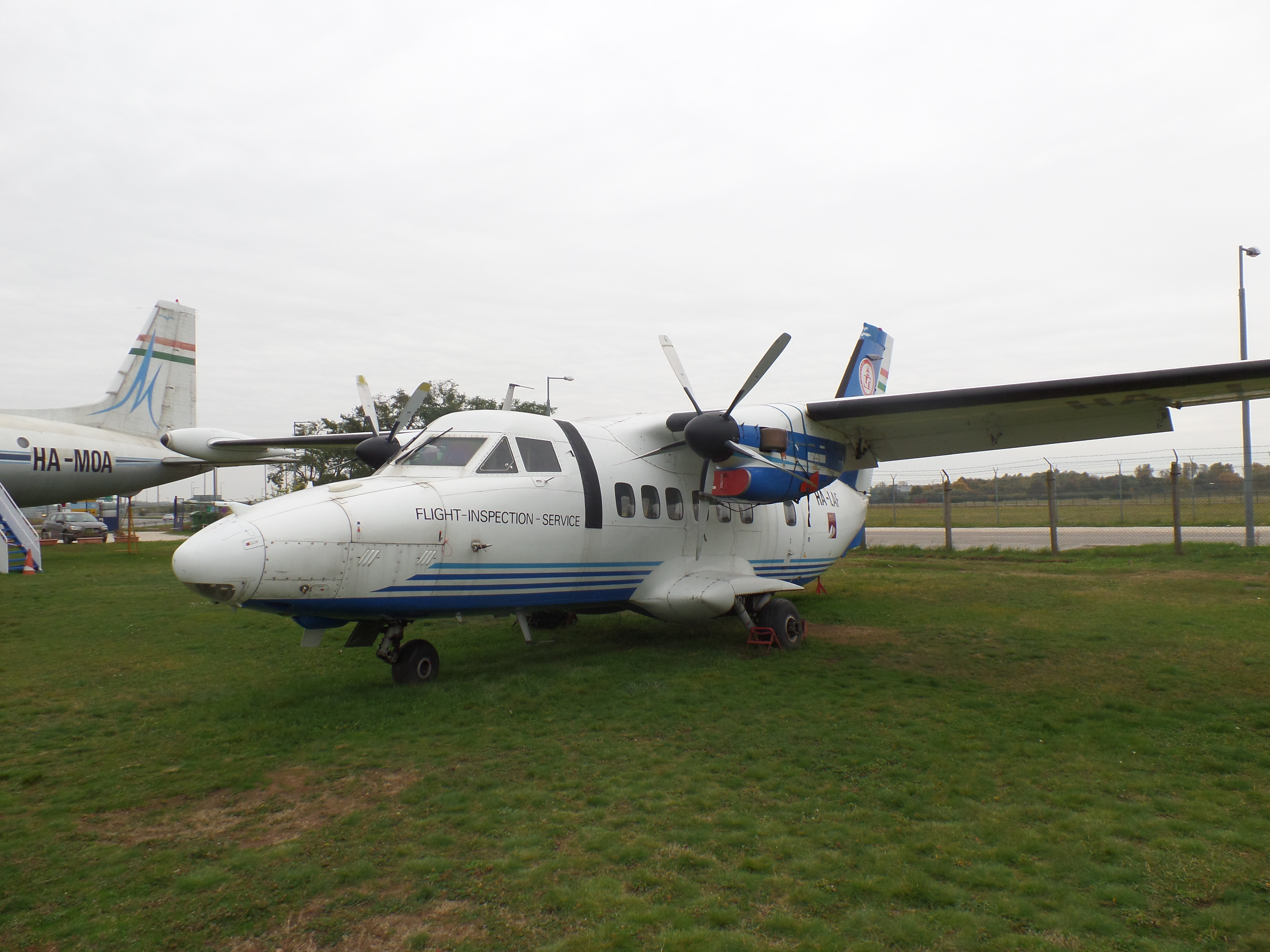
Let L-410 HA-LAF

This Let L-410 Turbolet aircraft was built in Czechoslovakia in 1991, and immediately afterwards it was transferred to Hungary, where it flew in the Aviaexpress fleet. After the airline's demise in 2003, the aircraft was retired and transferred to Aeropark. Its interior can be visited.

=== Tesla PAR ===
A Tesla RP-4G precision approach radar was placed next to taxiway B of runway 13R/31L in January 1975. In the same month it was severely damaged by Malév's Ilyushin Il-18 (HA-MOH), arriving from Berlin and crashing next to the taxiway. The PAR was repaired and used until the early 1990s, then given to the aviation museum in 1991.

The collection also includes a Soloviev D-30KP low-bypass turbofan engine, an Aerotrak pushback tractor, Douglas DC12-44 heavy aircraft tug, follow me cars and several buses in retro Malév liveries.

== Gallery ==
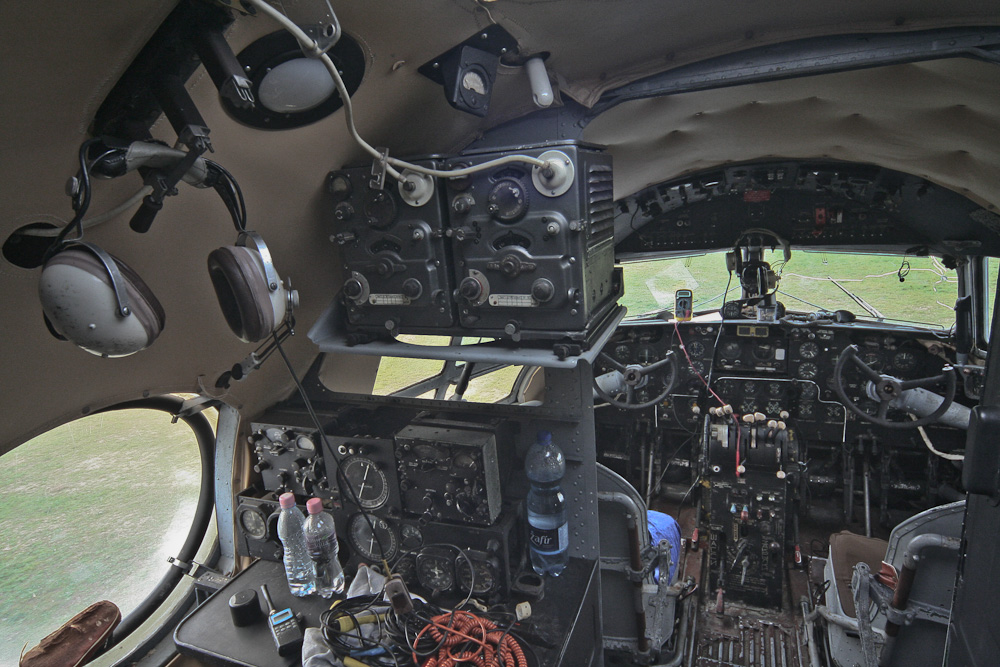
Il-14 HA-MAL cockpit

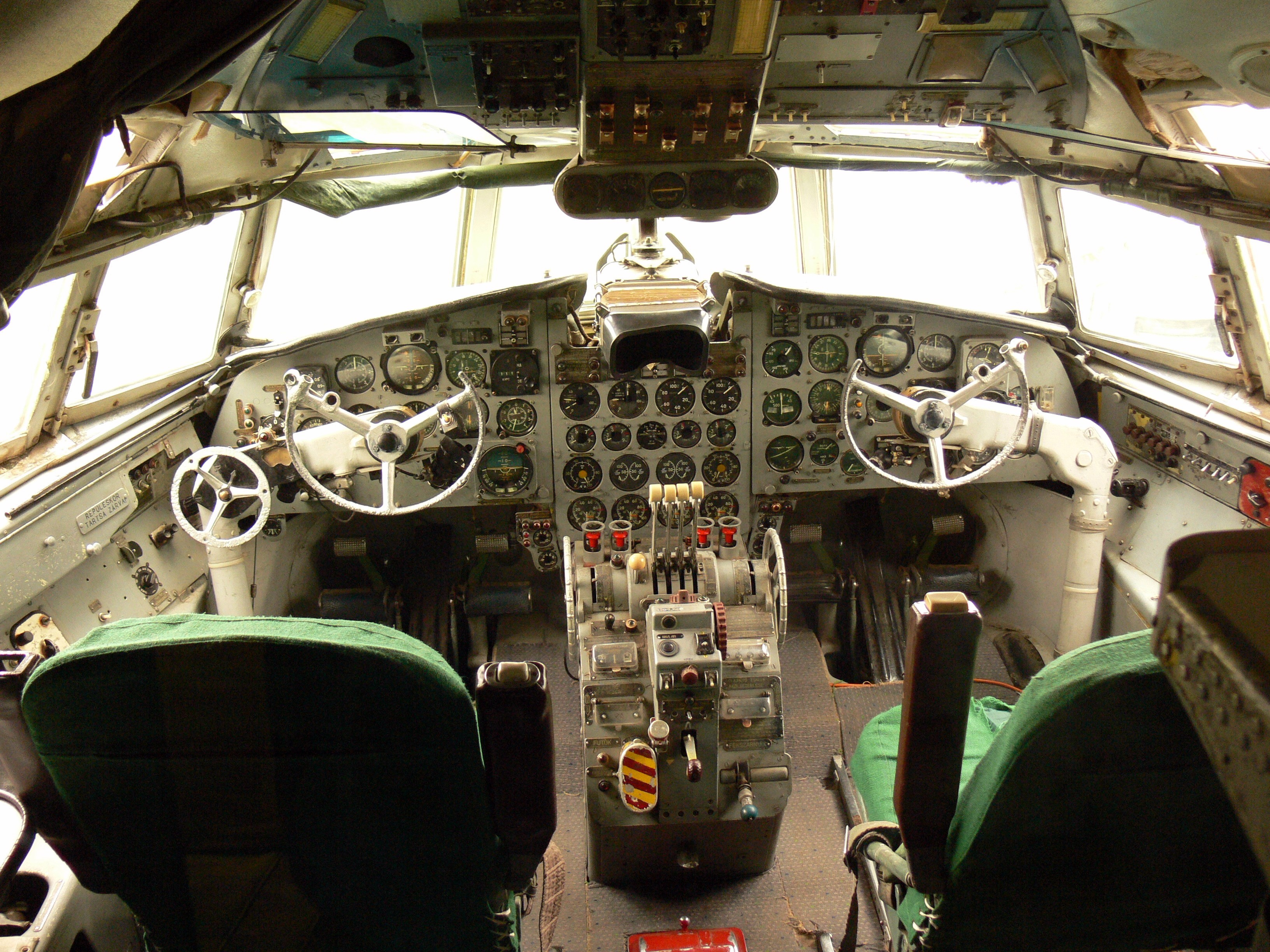
Il-18 HA-MOA cockpit

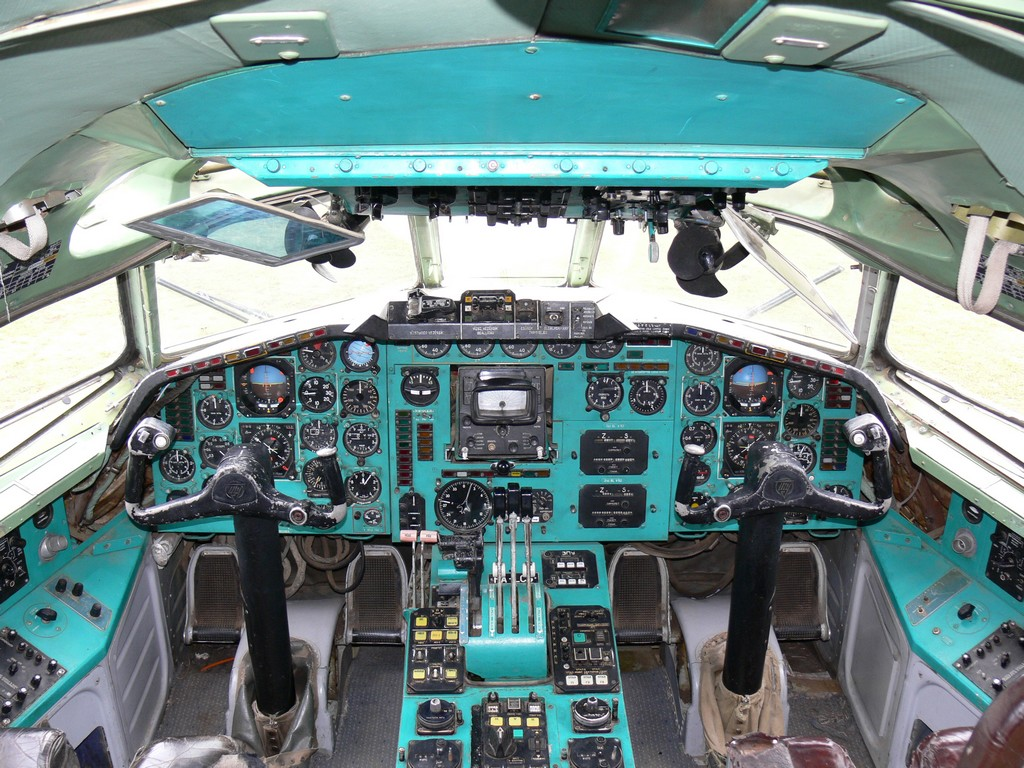
Tu-154 HA-LCG cockpit

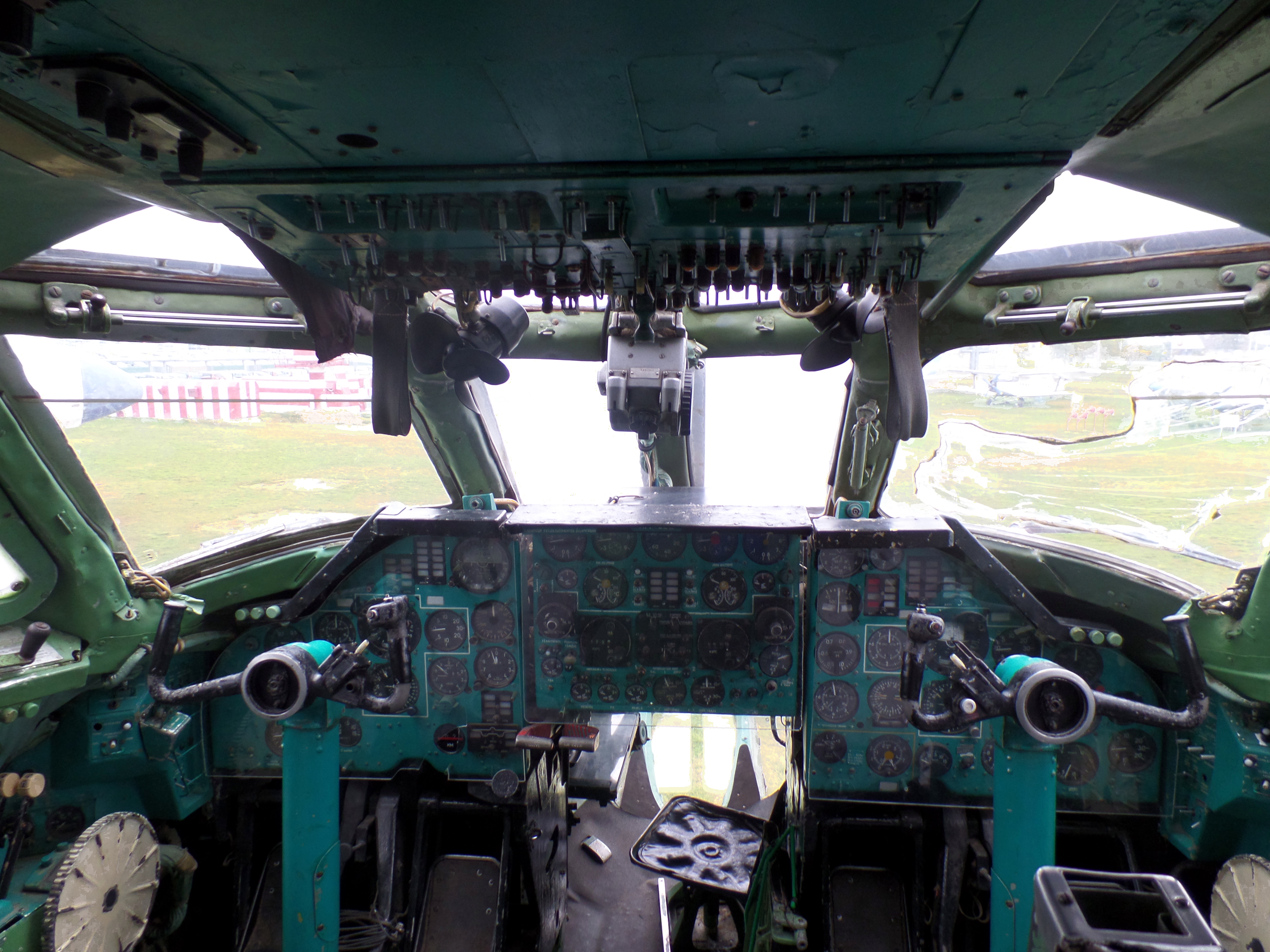
Tu-134 HA-LBE cockpit

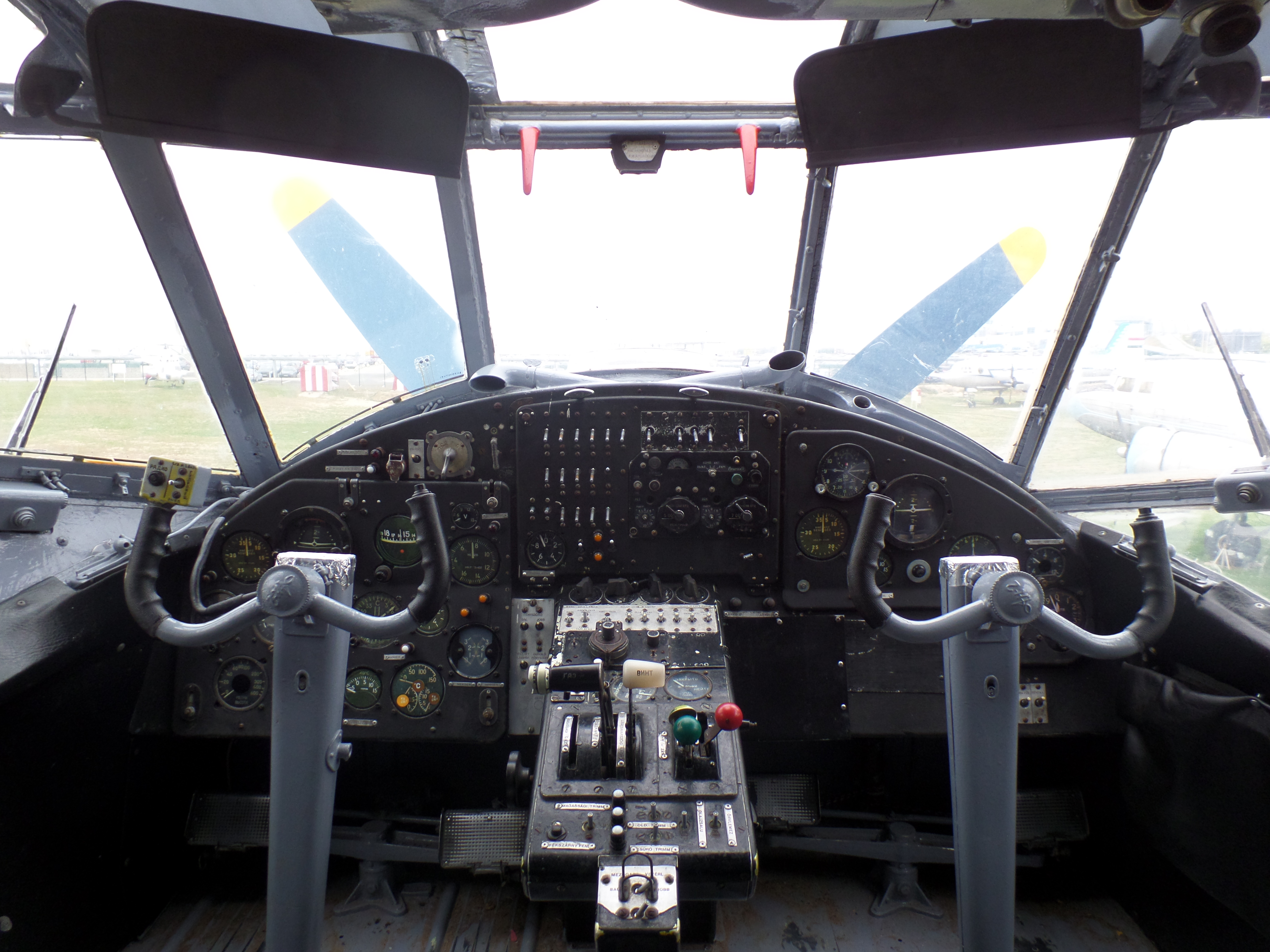
Antonov An-2R HA-YHF cockpit

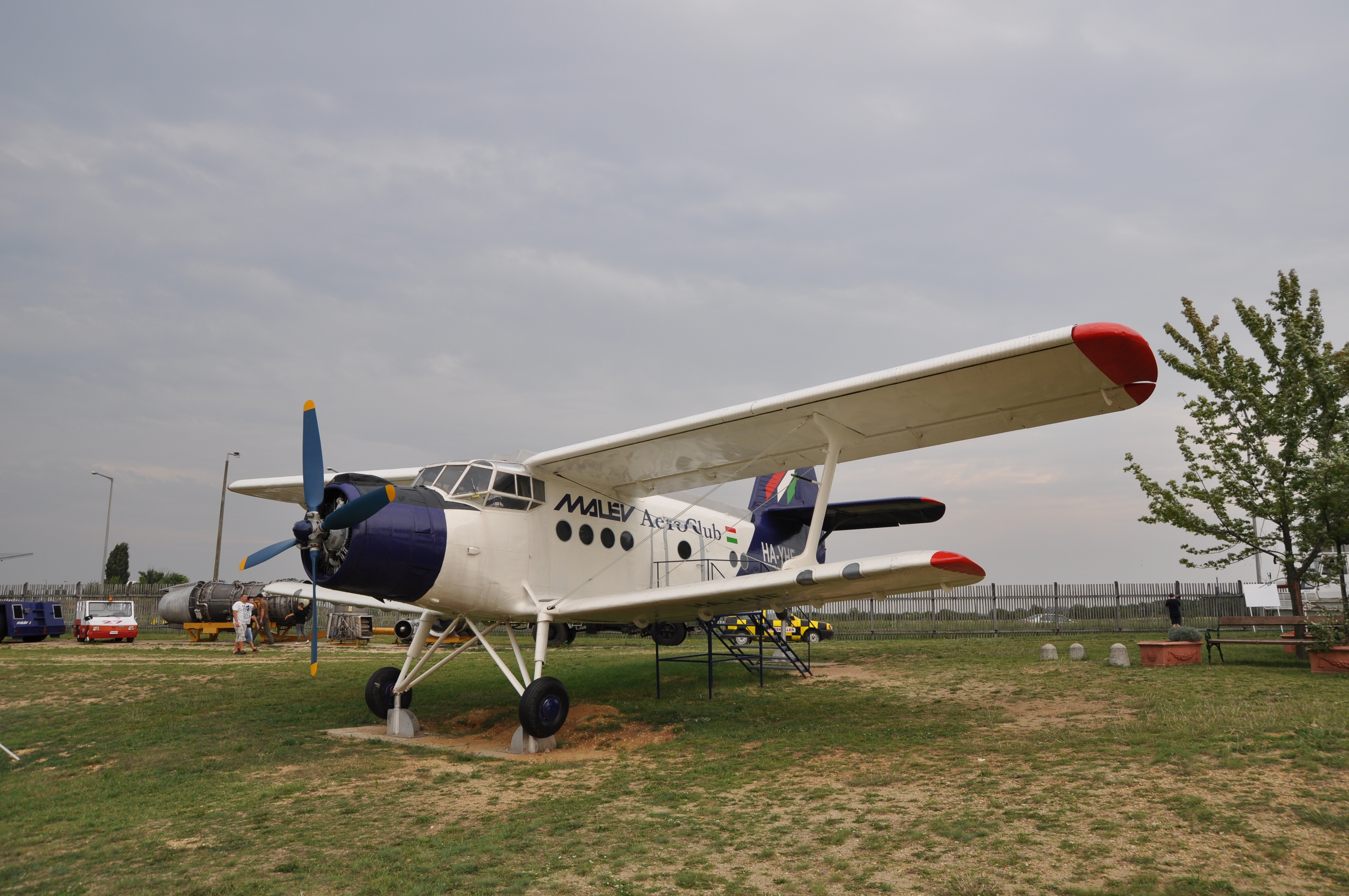
Antonov An-2R HA-YHF

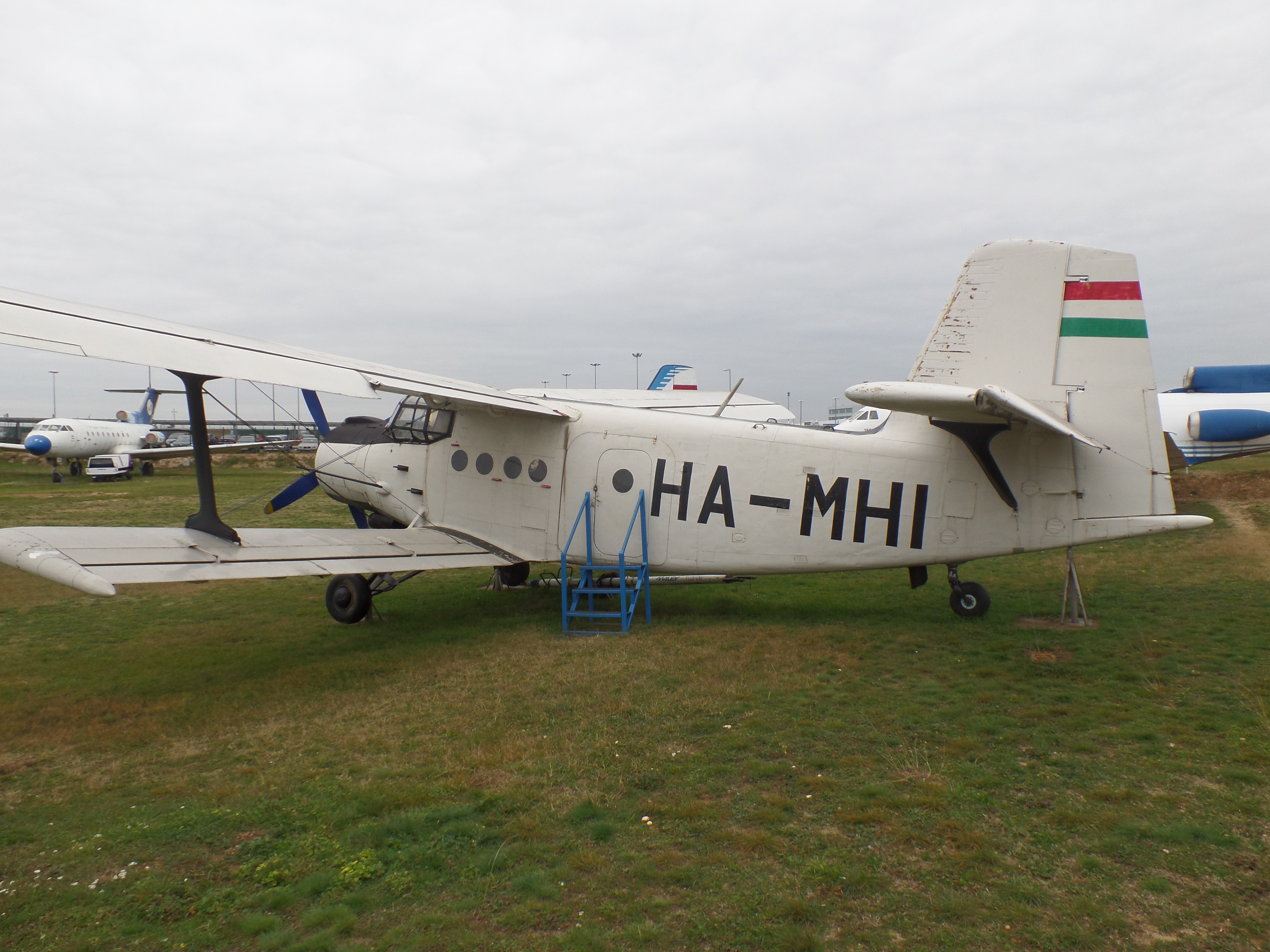
Antonov An-2M HA-MHI

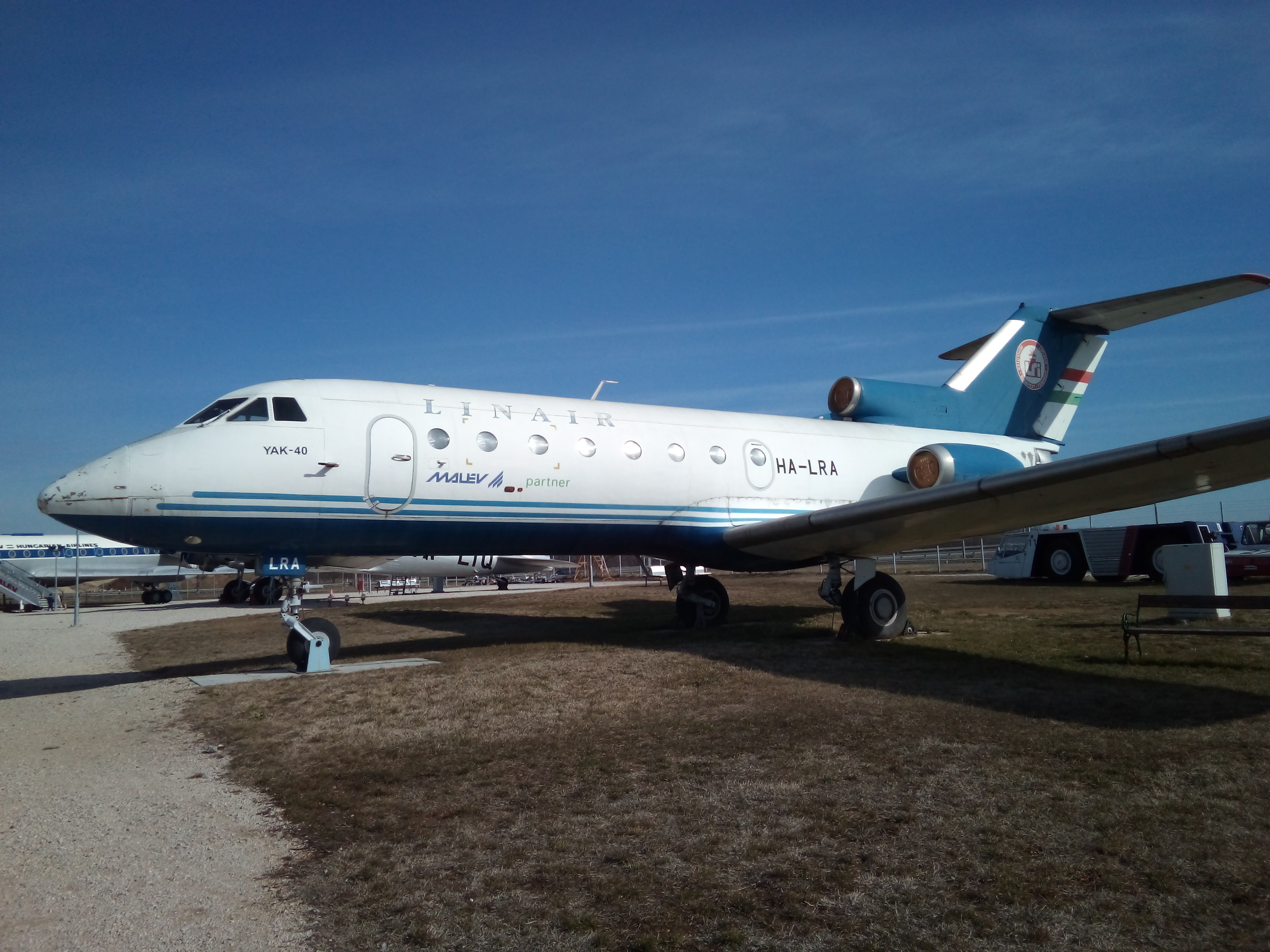
Yakovlev Yak-40 HA-LRA

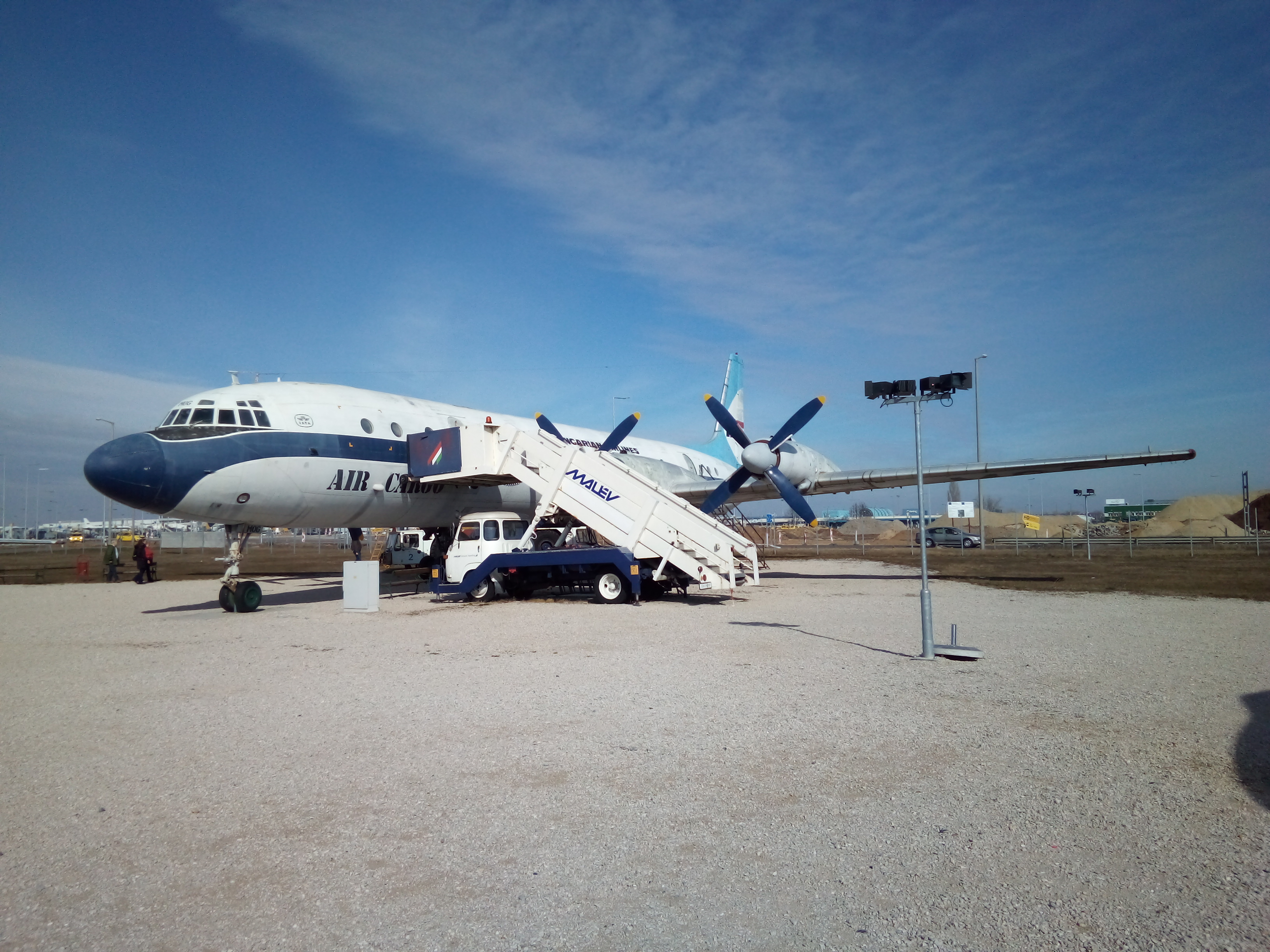
Il-18 HA-MOG

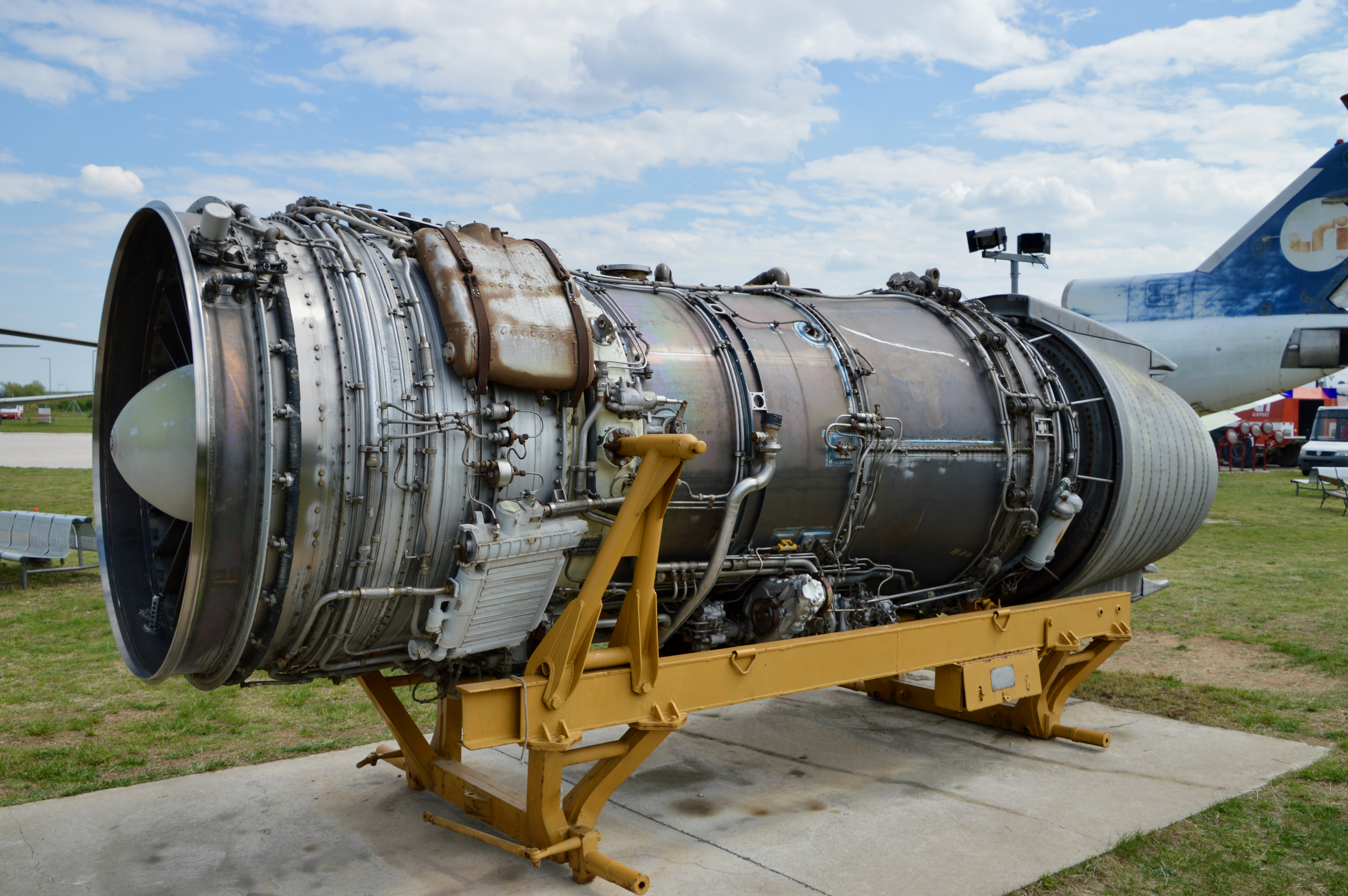
Soloviev D-30KP

== Transport ==
Aeropark has its own stop on the route of the 200E bus of Budapest. It also has a parking lot.

== See also ==
- List of aerospace museums
