= Budapest bus route 200E =

Bus route in Budapest, Hungary

Route 200E
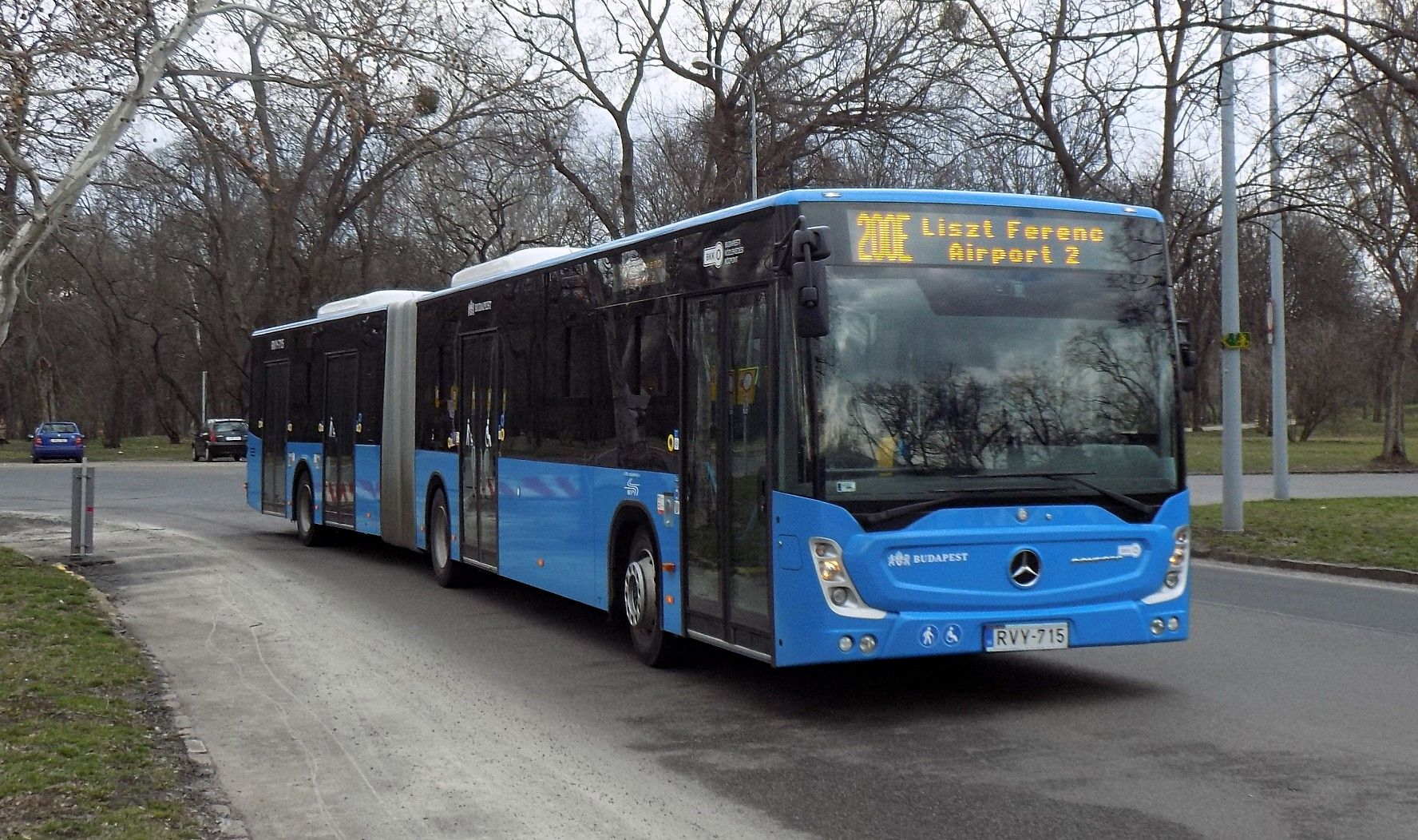

Overview
- Operator: BKV Zrt.
- Depot: Dél-Pest
- Vehicle: Volvo 7700A; Mercedes Conecto G NG
- Status: active
- Began service: September 6, 2008

Route
- Start: Liszt Ferenc Airport 2
- Via: Aeropark; Ferihegy railway station; Szemeretelep railway station; Pestszentlőrinc railway station
- End: Kőbánya-Kispest

Service
- Level: Daily
- Operates: Nonstop
Route map

Route 200E is a bus route in Budapest. Alongside the 100E express service, it is one of two bus lines serving Ferenc Liszt International Airport. During the day, the line runs between the airport and the nearest Budapest Metro station, Kőbánya-Kispest; at night, it runs to Határ út. 200E operates at all times and is operated by Budapesti Közlekedési Zrt. (BKV) for Budapesti Közlekedési Központ (BKK).

== History ==
BKV began operating a local and express bus service to the airport in 1960, initially signed as 93 and 193, respectively. Originally, both routes ran from Vörösmarty tér, but as the M3 metro line was constructed, the inbound terminus of these services first shifted to Nagyvárad tér in the 1970s and then, in 1980, to Kőbánya-Kispest. These services were eventually consolidated in 2000 as the Reptér-busz (Airport Bus). In 2006, this route was resigned as 200.

In 2008, as part of a BKV transit system overhaul, the route was resigned again as 200E. In 2017, it was supplemented by the 100E service; unlike the 100E, however, it does not require a premium fare. Since June 2018, the 200E operates at all times.

== Route ==
Toward Kőbánya-Kispest (and Határ út)	Toward Liszt Ferenc Airport 2
Liszt Ferenc Airport 2 (terminus) – Repülőtéri bekötőút – Road 4 – Üllői út – Ferihegyi repülőtérre vezető út – Gyömrői út – Ferihegyi repülőtérre vezető út – Kispesti lehajtó – Lehel utca – szervizút – Kőbánya-Kispest (terminus) (– Déli bejáró út – Vak Bottyán utca – Lehel utca – Üllői út – Határ út M (terminus))	(Határ út M (terminus) – Üllői út – Lehel utca – Vak Bottyán utca – Déli bejáró út –) Kőbánya-Kispest M (terminus) – szervizút – Ferihegyi repülőtérre vezető út – Gyömrői út – Ferihegyi repülőtérre vezető út – Üllői út – Road 4 – Repülőtéri bekötőút – Liszt Ferenc Airport 2 (terminus)

== Stops and connections ==
200E (Liszt Ferenc Airport 2 ◄► Kőbánya-Kispest M)
200E (Liszt Ferenc Airport 2 ◄► Határ út M)
Travel time (↓) (minutes)		Stop name (in English)	Travel time (↑) (minutes)		Connection	Buildings / Monuments
0		Liszt Ferenc Airport 2 terminus	23	25		Budapest Ferenc Liszt International Airport (Terminal 2A, 2B, Sky Court)
1		Repülőmúzeum (Aviation museum)	∫			Aeropark
∫		Nemzetközi Posta Kicserélő Központ (International Center for Post Exchange)	19	22	580; P+R	
∫		Cargo City	(+3)	(+3)		
3		Vecsés-nyugat (West Side of Vecsés)	16	19	193E, 236; 575	Market Central Ferihegy
5		Repülőtéri Rendőr Igazgatóság (Airport Police Directorate)	14	17	576, 580, 581	
6		Repülőtér, D porta (Airport, Gate D)	13	17	575, 576, 580, 581	
8		Ferihegy vasútállomás (Ferihegy railway station)	11	15	166, 236, 236A, 266; 575, 576, 580, 581; Hungarian State Railways (MÁV)	Ferihegy railway station, Budapest Ferenc Liszt International Airport (Terminal 1, closed)
10		Szemeretelep vasútállomás (Szemeretelep railway station)	9	13	93, 183; Hungarian State Railways (MÁV)	Szemeretelep railway station
11		Billentyű utca	∫		93	
13		Csévéző utca	7	11	93, 93A, 98, 98E, 198, 217, 217E; 946	
15		Pestszentlőrinc vasútállomás (átjáró) (Pestszentlőrinc railway station (passageway)	5	9	36, 98, 98E, 217, 217E; Hungarian State Railways (MÁV)	Pestszentlőrinc railway station
16		Felsőcsatári út	4	8	36, 95, 98, 98E, 193E, 217, 217E, 282E, 284E; 577	Sárkány Center
20		Kőbánya-Kispest P+R	∫		98E, 193E, 282E, 284E; 575, 576, 577, 580, 581; P+R	Metro station, KöKi Terminál
The buses run to Határ út stop at night, not serving Kőbánya-Kispest M.
22	∫	Kőbánya-Kispest M terminus	0	5	68, 85, 85E, 93, 93A, 98, 98E, 132E, 136, 148, 151, 182, 182A, 184, 193E, 202E, 268, 282E, 284E; 984, 985; 575, 576, 577, 580, 581; Hungarian State Railways (MÁV); P+R	Bus station, Metro station, Kőbánya-Kispest railway station, KöKi Terminál
∫	24	Határ út M terminus	∫	0	42, 50, 52; 66, 123A, 194, 294E; 914, 914A, 948, 950, 950A, 984, 985, 994	Bus station, Metro station, Shopmark, Ibis Budapest Aero Hotel
