= Ferihegy railway station =

Railway station in Budapest, Hungary

Coordinates: 47°26′15″N 19°13′25″E

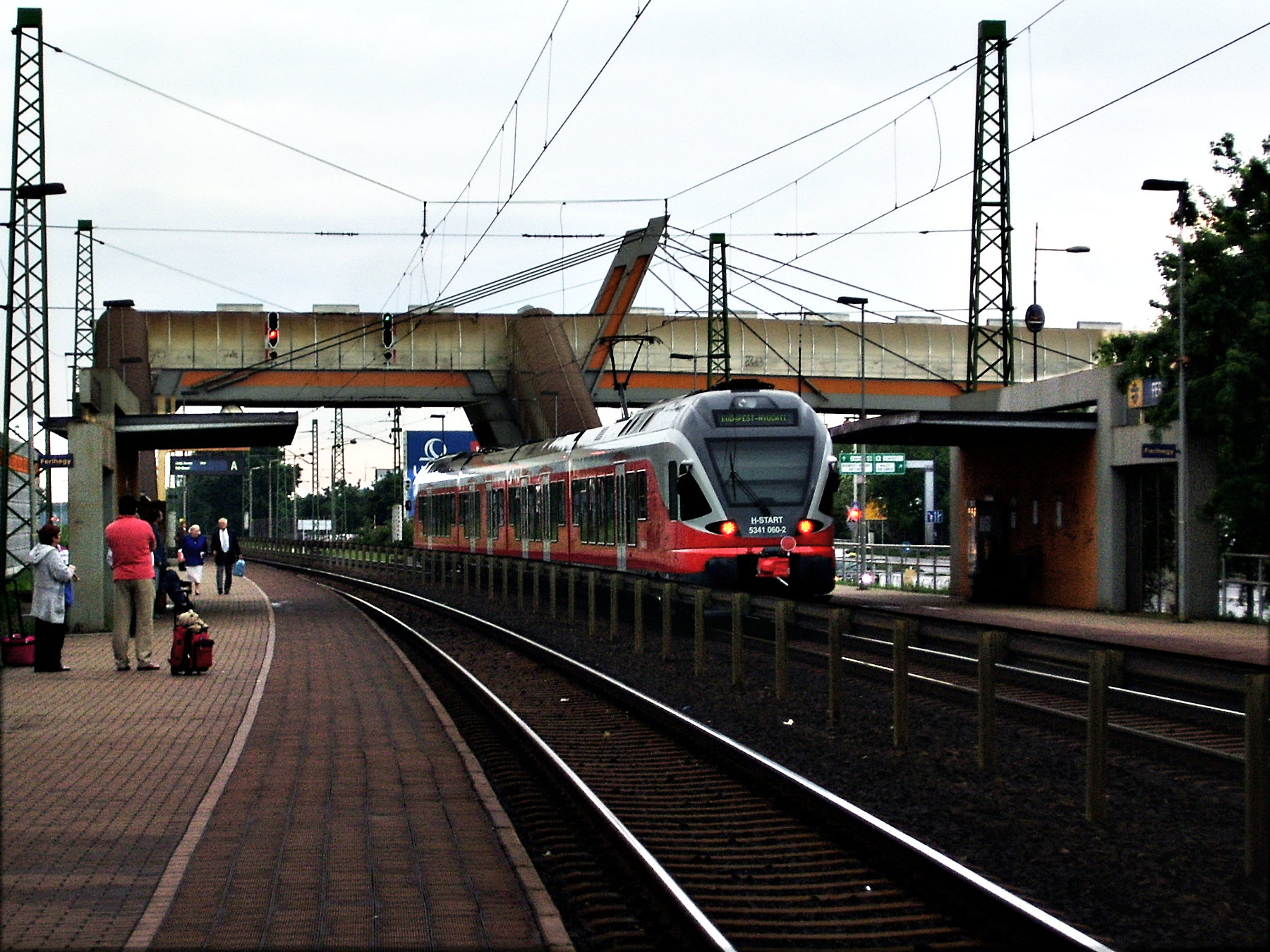
Ferihegy railway station

Ferihegy railway station (Hungarian: Ferihegy vasútállomás) is a railway station on the southeastern edge of Budapest, Hungary. Hungarian State Railways runs suburban and long-distance services between this station and Nyugati Railway Station in Budapest city centre through Kőbánya-Kispest.

It is located adjacent to the now-closed Terminal One of Budapest Ferihegy International Airport (now Budapest Ferenc Liszt International Airport). The Airport's Terminal Two is approximately 4 km away, and connected to the station by bus 200E.
