= Budapest Ferenc Liszt International Airport =

Airport in Budapest, Hungary

Budapest Ferenc Liszt International Airport Budapest Liszt Ferenc Nemzetközi Repülőtér

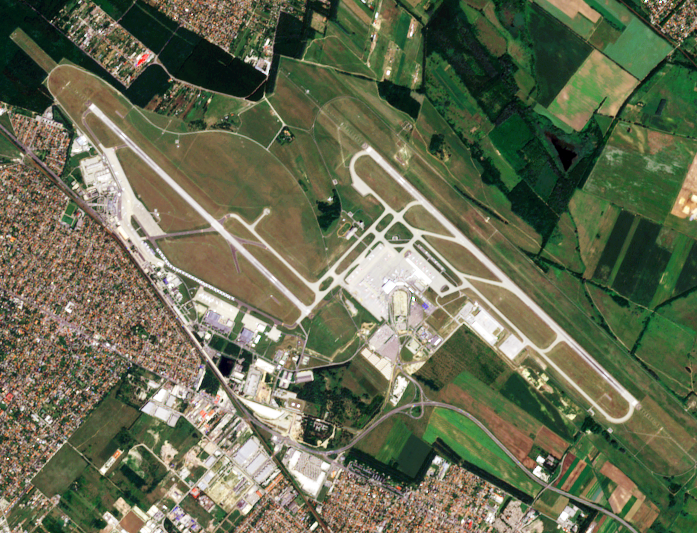
- Satellite view of the airport in 2021
- IATA: BUD; ICAO: LHBP

Summary
- Airport type: Public
- Owner/Operator: Budapest Airport Ltd.
- Serves: Budapest metropolitan area
- Location: 16 km (8 1/2 nmi) south-east of center of Budapest
- Hub for: Smartwings Hungary; Wizz Air
- Operating base for: Ryanair; Wizz Air
- Elevation AMSL: 151 m (495 ft)
- Coordinates: 47°26′22″N 019°15′43″E
- Website: www.bud.hu/en

Map
- Location in Hungary Location in Budapest Location in Europe

Runways
Direction	Length		Surface
Direction	m	ft	Surface
13L/31R	3,707	12,162	Asphalt concrete
13R/31L	3,010	9,875	Asphalt concrete

Statistics (2025)
- Passengers: 19,632,894
- Change from 2024 to 2025: ▲11.7%
- Sources: Passenger Traffic, ACI Europe; AIP of Hungary

Budapest Ferenc Liszt International Airport (Hungarian: Budapest Liszt Ferenc Nemzetközi Repülőtér, pronounced [ˈbudɒpɛʃt ˈlist ˈfɛrɛnt͡s ˈnɛmzɛtkøzi ˈrɛpyløːteːr]) (IATA: BUD, ICAO: LHBP), formerly known as Budapest Ferihegy International Airport and commonly called Ferihegy (Hungarian pronunciation: [ˈfɛrihɛɟ]), is the international airport serving the Hungarian capital city of Budapest. It is the largest of the country's four commercial airports, ahead of Debrecen and Hévíz–Balaton. The airport is located 16 kilometres (8 1/2 nautical miles) southeast of the center of Budapest (bordering Pest county) and was renamed in 2011 after Hungarian composer Franz Liszt (Hungarian: Liszt Ferenc) on the occasion of his 200th birthday. The facility covers 1,515 hectares (3,744 acres) and has two runways.

Although Ferenc Liszt primarily offers international connections to other European cities, destinations in North America, Africa, the Middle East, and East Asia are also served. In 2024, the airport handled 17.6 million passengers. It is the headquarters of and primary hub for Wizz Air and a base for Ryanair. It was the primary hub of Malév Hungarian Airlines until the airline's bankruptcy on 3 February 2012, which initially caused a significant drop in connecting passengers, flights, and cargo.

== Name ==
Ferihegy is the name of the neighbourhood around the airport, after Ferenc Xavér Mayerffy (1776–1845), the previous landowner who established vineyards and contributed to the development of viticulture in Pest-Buda. "Feri" is a diminutive form of Ferenc. "Hegy" means mountain: though the area is almost totally flat, a 147 m sandy hillock was levelled during construction of the airport in the 1940s. On 25 March 2011, marking the 200th anniversary of the birth of the world-famous Hungarian pianist and composer Franz Liszt, Budapest Ferenc Liszt International Airport officially adopted his name in tribute to one of the most distinguished figures in Hungary's cultural heritage.

== History ==
=== Designing and construction (1939–1944) ===
In 1938, the idea of a new civilian and military airport for Budapest was born, to be built at the boundary of the settlements of Pestszentlőrinc, Rákoshegy and Vecsés. Civil facilities were to be built in the northwestern section and military ones in the southwestern section. A public tender was invited for the design and construction of the structures.

In December 1939, the designs of the pioneering modern architect Károly Dávid Jr. (1903–1973) were chosen, with a terminal building which resembled an aircraft viewed from above. Work commenced in 1942. To approach the airport from the city, a 16-kilometre (10 mi) highway was constructed between 1940 and 1943, which, after improvements, remains in use today.

The military buildings were hastily constructed from 1940 to serve war needs, with aviation starting in 1943, while civil construction halted at the beginning of 1944. Many of the airport buildings were damaged during the Soviet Budapest offensive. By the end of 1944, the city and its airport were under Soviet occupation.

=== Reconstruction (1947–1950) ===
In 1947, it was decided that the airport would be reconstructed for civil aviation over three years, with 40 million forints allocated. The opening ceremony was held in May 1950, though not all sections were finished, and operations began by the Magyar-Szovjet Polgári Légiforgalmi Rt. (MASZOVLET, Hungarian-Soviet Civil Aviation Co. Ltd.), established in 1946. The airlines operated only a few foreign flights, including to Prague, Bucharest, Warsaw, and Sofia.

Magyar Légiforgalmi Vállalat (Malév, Hungarian Airlines) was established on 25 November 1954. The first regular flight from the airport to Western Europe was a Malév flight to Vienna in summer 1956. The first Western airline flying to Budapest was KLM in 1957. The terminal building was finished in this period and the 2,500-metre (8,202 ft) runway was built. At the end of 1958 the runway was lengthened to 3,010 metres (9,875 ft) and taxiway D was finished.

=== Continued growth (1960–1980) ===
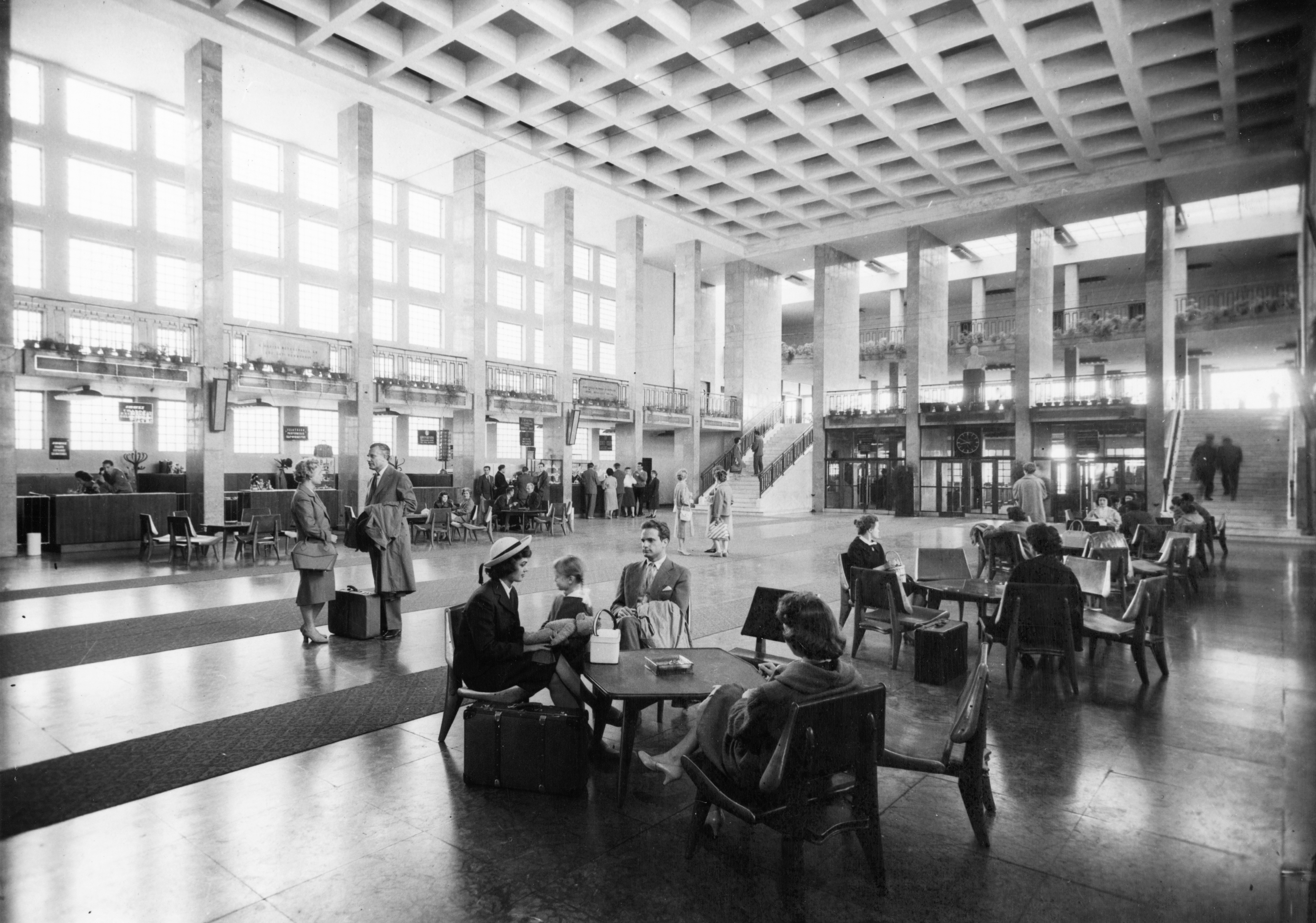
Budapest Airport in 1961

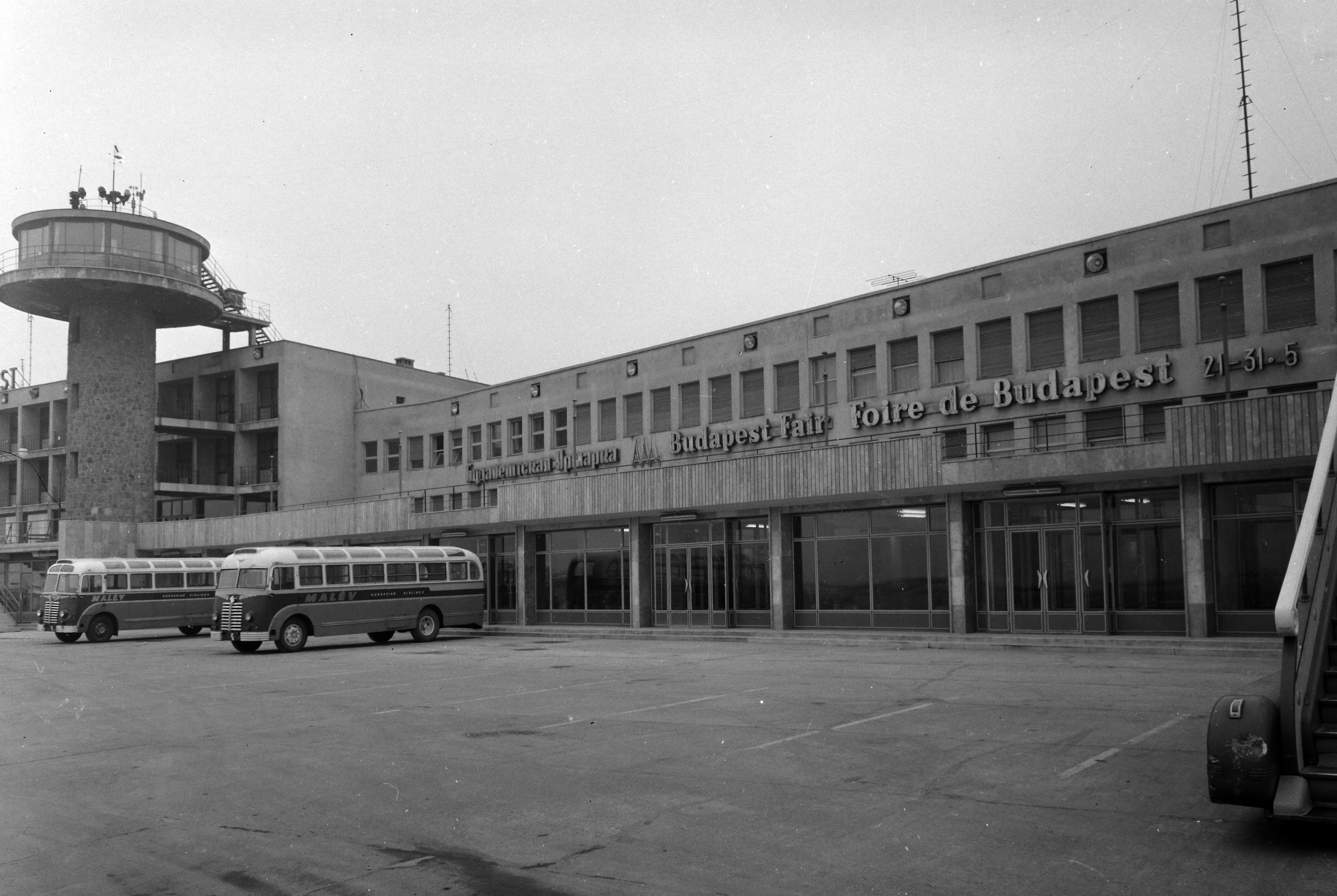
Budapest Airport in 1966

From 1950 to 1960, the number of landings increased from 4,786 to 17,133, with passenger traffic increasing from 49,955 to 359,338. In 1974, passenger traffic reached one million. In 1977, a new control tower was built, as well as a second runway parallel to the old one and a MALÉV maintenance facility. The new 3,707-metre (12,162 ft) runway opened in September 1983.

=== Jewish exodus and new infrastructure (1980–2000) ===
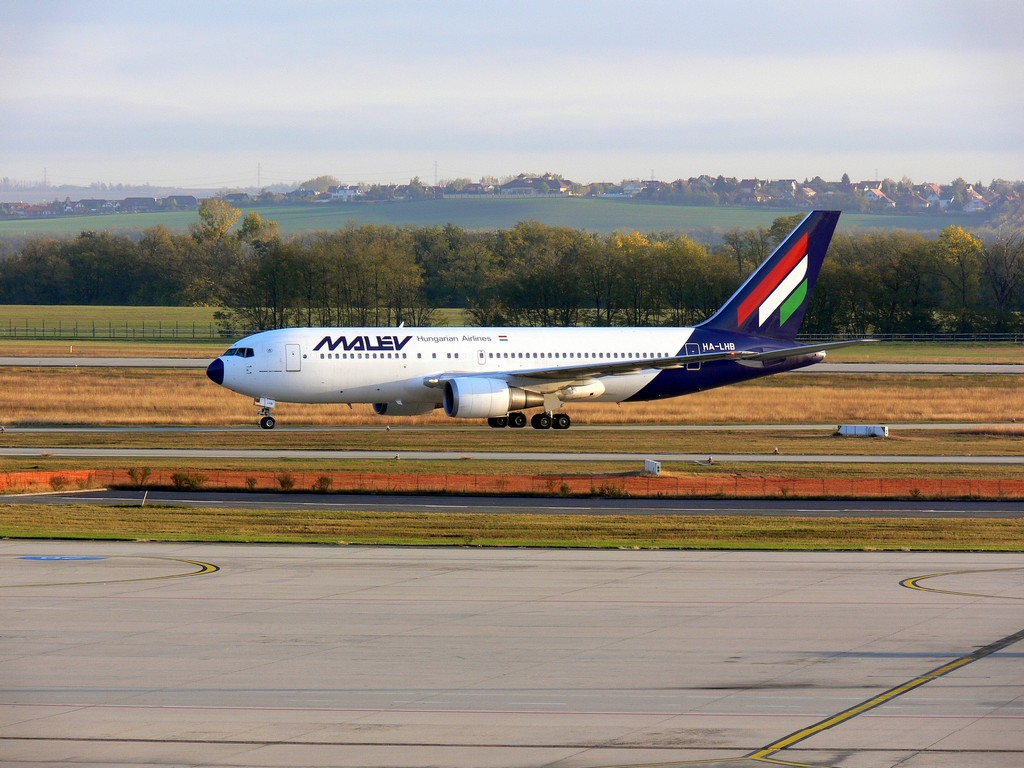
A Boeing 767-200ER of former flag carrier Malév Hungarian Airlines at the airport in 2008

From 1989 to 1991, Budapest Ferihegy Airport served as a major transit hub for over 160,000 Soviet Jewish emigrants en route to Israel. With direct flights from the Soviet Union to Israel still politically sensitive and unavailable until late 1991, the Jewish Agency and Malév Hungarian Airlines jointly operated a series of charter flights connecting Moscow, Budapest, and Tel Aviv.

The operation made Hungary a key logistical partner in the post-Soviet aliyah and symbolized its broader turn toward pro-Western humanitarian policies. The airport became the focus of international attention and security concerns, including threats of terrorism. In December 1991, the radical German Communist Red Army Faction attempted an IED bombing against a Jewish refugee bus convoy on the road to Ferihegy.

In 1993, Malév launched the airport's first Hungarian transatlantic flight, to New York-Newark via Rome. According to traffic forecasts for the new millennium, the two terminals serving 4 million passengers a year promised to be insufficient. The 30,000 m² Terminal 2B opened in 1997 with seven gates, five remote stands, and a capacity of 3.5 million passengers a year. All foreign airlines moved to the new terminal.

=== Public to public-private ownership (2000–2012) ===
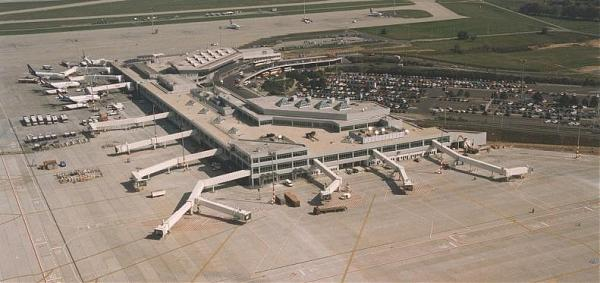
Terminal 2 in 2008, prior to the construction of the Sky Court

On 8 December 2005, a 75% stake in Ferihegy Airport was bought by BAA plc for 464.5 billion HUF (approx. US$2.1 billion), including the right of operation for 75 years.

On 20 October 2006, BAA announced intentions to sell its stake in Budapest Airport to a consortium led by the German airport group, Hochtief AirPort GmbH, subject to the consent of the Hungarian State.

On 6 June 2007, BAA and a consortium led by Hochtief AirPort (HTA) formally closed and completed the transaction of the sale of BAA's shares in Budapest Airport to the Hochtief AirPort Consortium. The ownership of this was as follows: Hochtief AirPort (49.666%) and three financial investors: Caisse de dépôt et placement du Québec (23.167%), GIC Special Investments (23.167%) and KfW IPEX-Bank (4.0%).

On 15 November 2010, Budapest Airport regained the "Schengen Clear"-status, after implementing the necessary security actions and after that, the airport underwent the strict re-inspection.

SkyCourt, the new expansion project including shops, restaurants and lounges, also connecting Terminals 2A and 2B was opened on 27 March 2011. In summer that year, the refurbishment of the older parts of Terminal 2 began; work was completed in 2012.

=== Collapse of Malév, aftermath, and future (2012–present) ===
In the wake of the collapse of Malév, Ryanair announced that it would expand its flights to Liszt airport. Ryanair began selling the flight tickets to the public, but Budapest airport said that the company had not secured all of the necessary slots (which were later negotiated successfully).

However, the airport had lost Malév's transfer passengers, which, prior to the airline's collapse, had amounted to 1.5 million passengers per year. A second effect of the Malév collapse was that the Malév aircraft maintenance facilities would no longer generate revenue even once passenger traffic had been restored. These factors created significant financial shortfalls.

In February 2012, Hainan Airlines ceased services between Beijing and Budapest. Prior to the collapse of Malév, Hainan had a codeshare partnership with Malév.

In May 2013, Hochtief Group sold its stake in the Budapest airport to the Canadian Pension fund Public Sector Pension Investment Board (PSP Investments). Following the sale the HOCHTIEF AirPort division was renamed AviAlliance. In July 2015, the ownership of Budapest Airport was the following:

- AviAlliance (52.666%) owned by PSP Investments, Canada,
- Malton Investment (22.167%) owned by GIC Special Investments, Singapore,
- Caisse de dépôt et placement du Québec, Canada (20.167%),
- KfW IPEX-Bank, Germany (5%).

Up to December 2012, 61 million euros was spent to expand and modernise the airport infrastructure. In 2012 Terminals 2A and 2B were refurbished and connected to each other by the Skycourt main departures hall. Terminal 2B was extended in 2018. A new business and cargo area was constructed, the Budapest Airport Business Park, as well as a new airport hotel.

Several future expansion projects involve another 300 million euros, pending regulatory approval and third-party investment. Proposals include new cargo facilities and a new Terminal 3 originally planned for 2020. The newly appointed CEO stated in a 2021 interview that construction of the new terminal could commence in 2025.

In 2020, according to a report from Bloomberg, the Hungarian government was looking to buy the airport from its foreign owners such as GIC (Singaporean sovereign wealth fund) and Canadian AviAlliance, reversing the 2005 privatization which the current Prime Minister Viktor Orbán had opposed. In September 2023 the government made a formal bid to buy Budapest Airport.

On 6 June 2024, the government announced the purchase of the airport in partnership with Vinci Airports, the airport's operator. Hungary and Vinci, after paying €3.1 billion and assuming a net debt of €1.2 billion, respecitively hold 80% and 20% ownership. Vinci Airports will continue as operator, with a concession expiring in 2080.

== Terminals ==
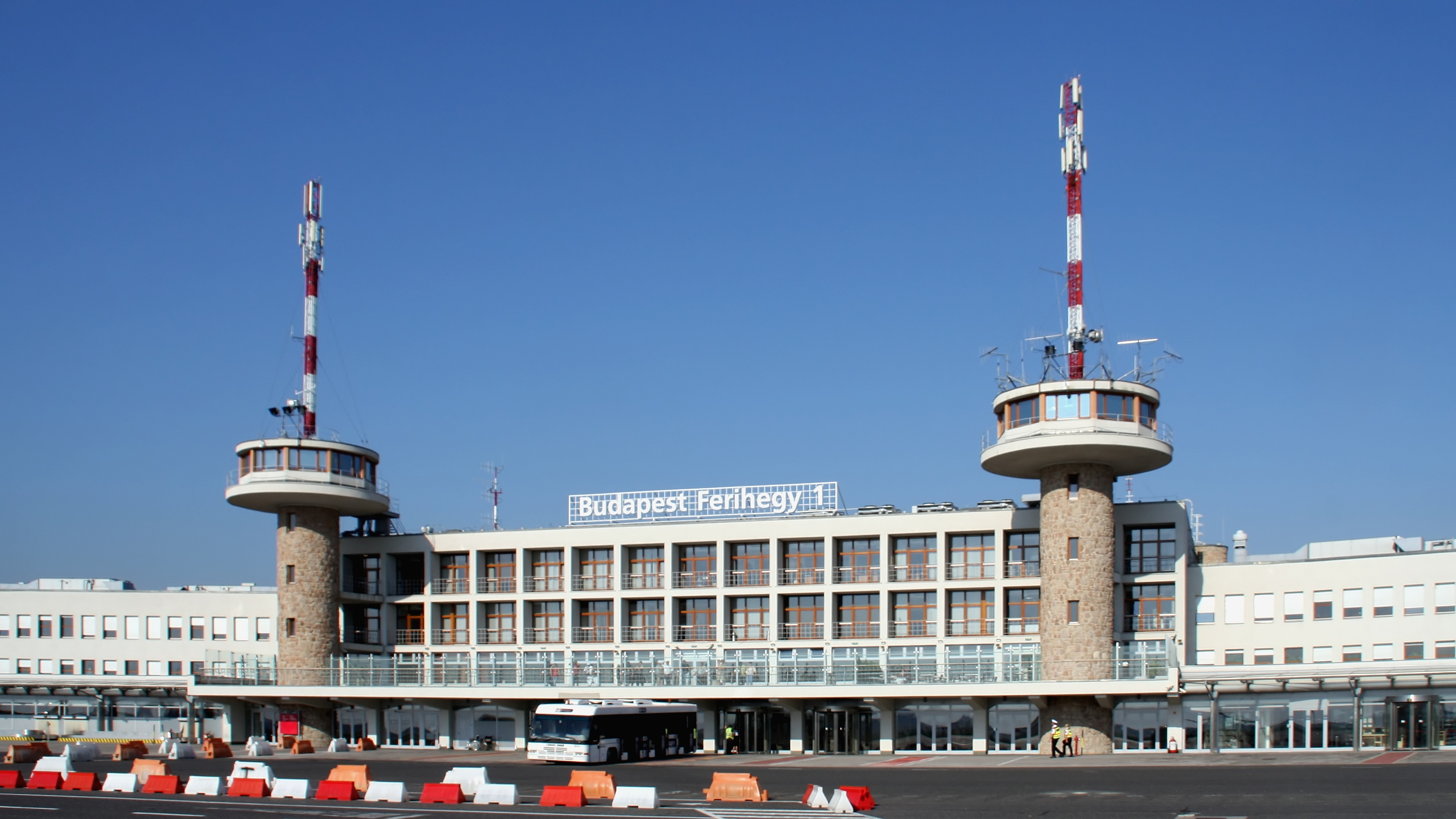
The now defunct Terminal 1

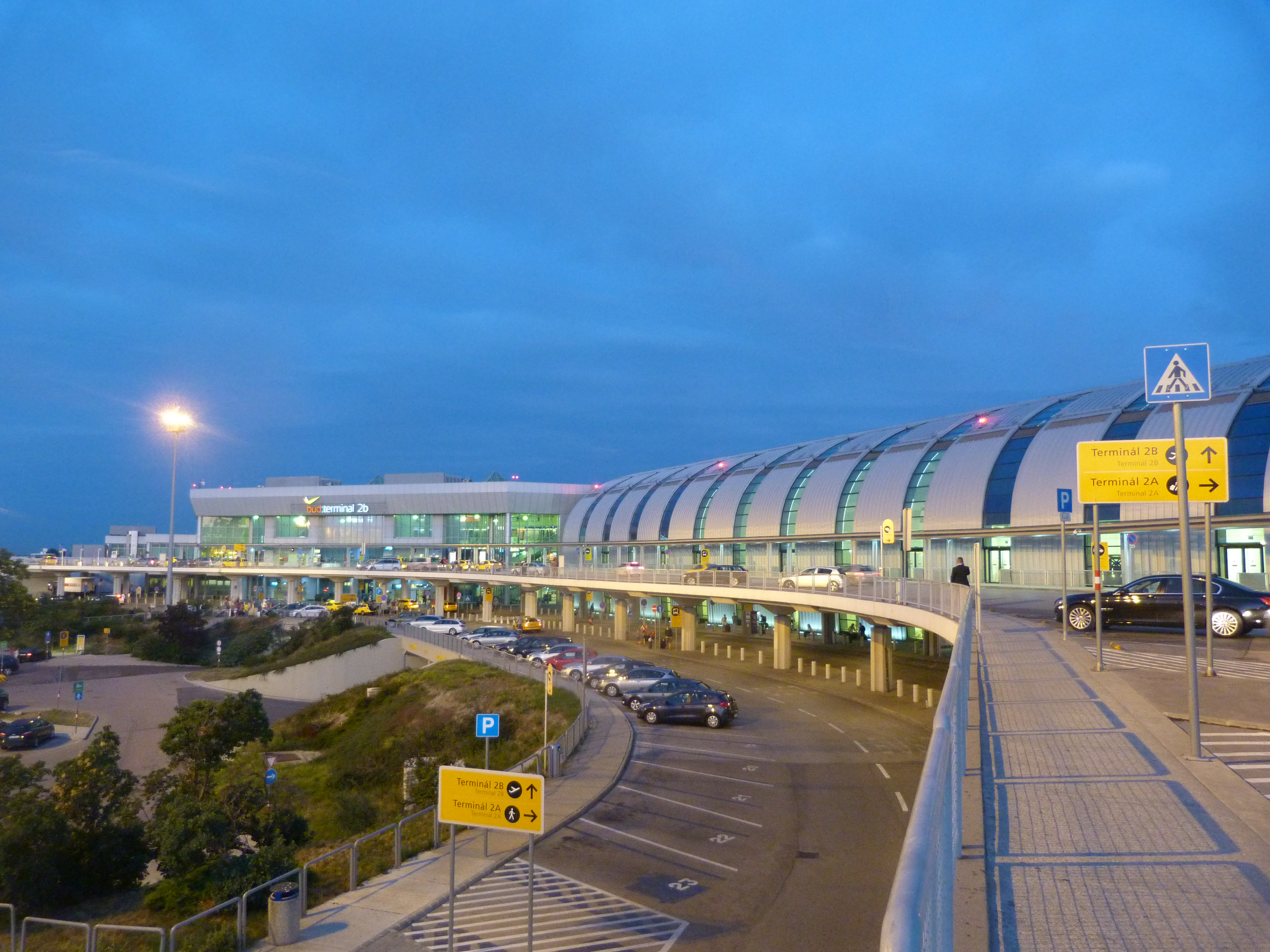
Terminal 2B

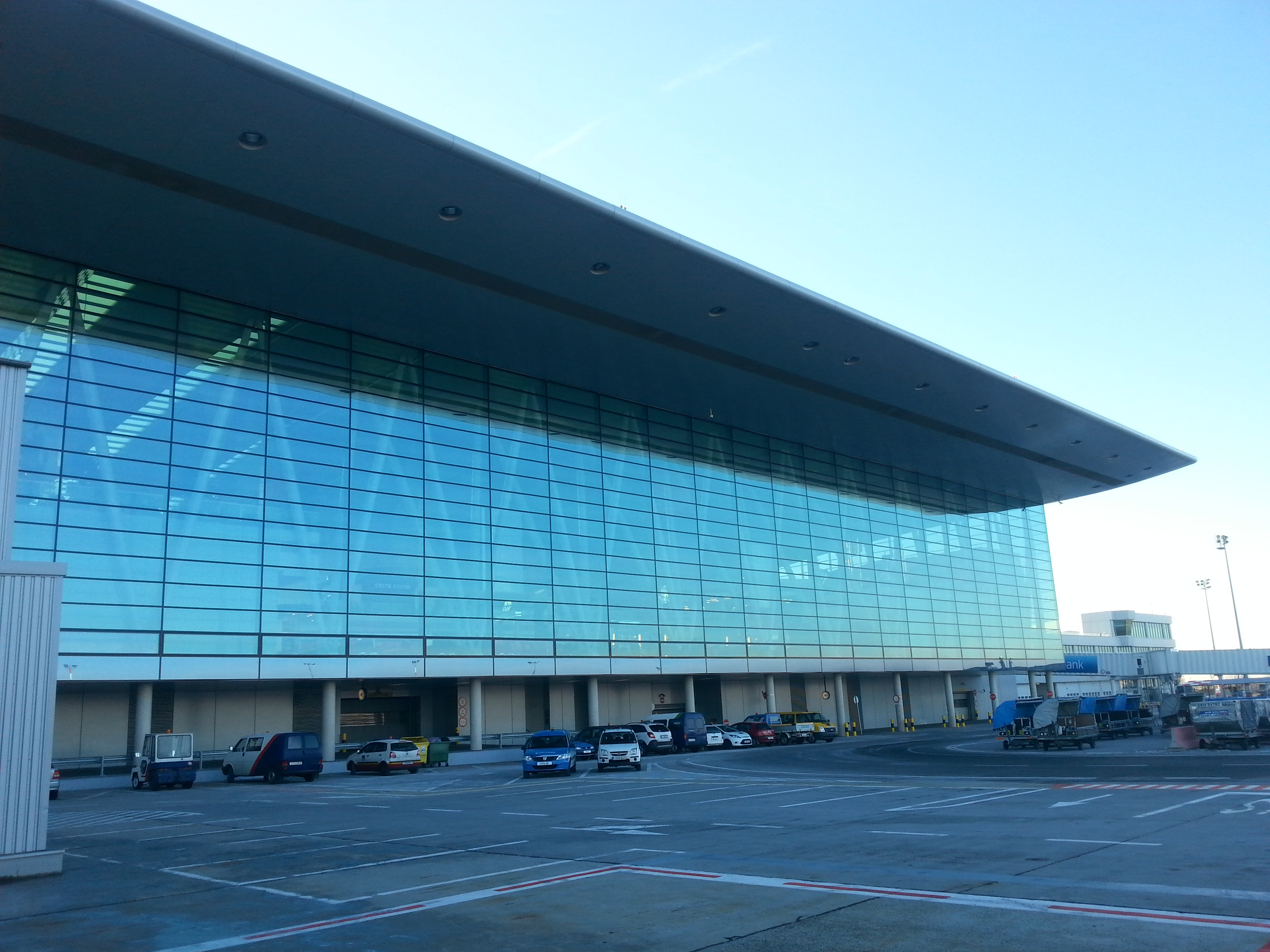
Sky Court, the connection building between Terminals 2A and 2B which now houses the main departures waiting hall and shopping area

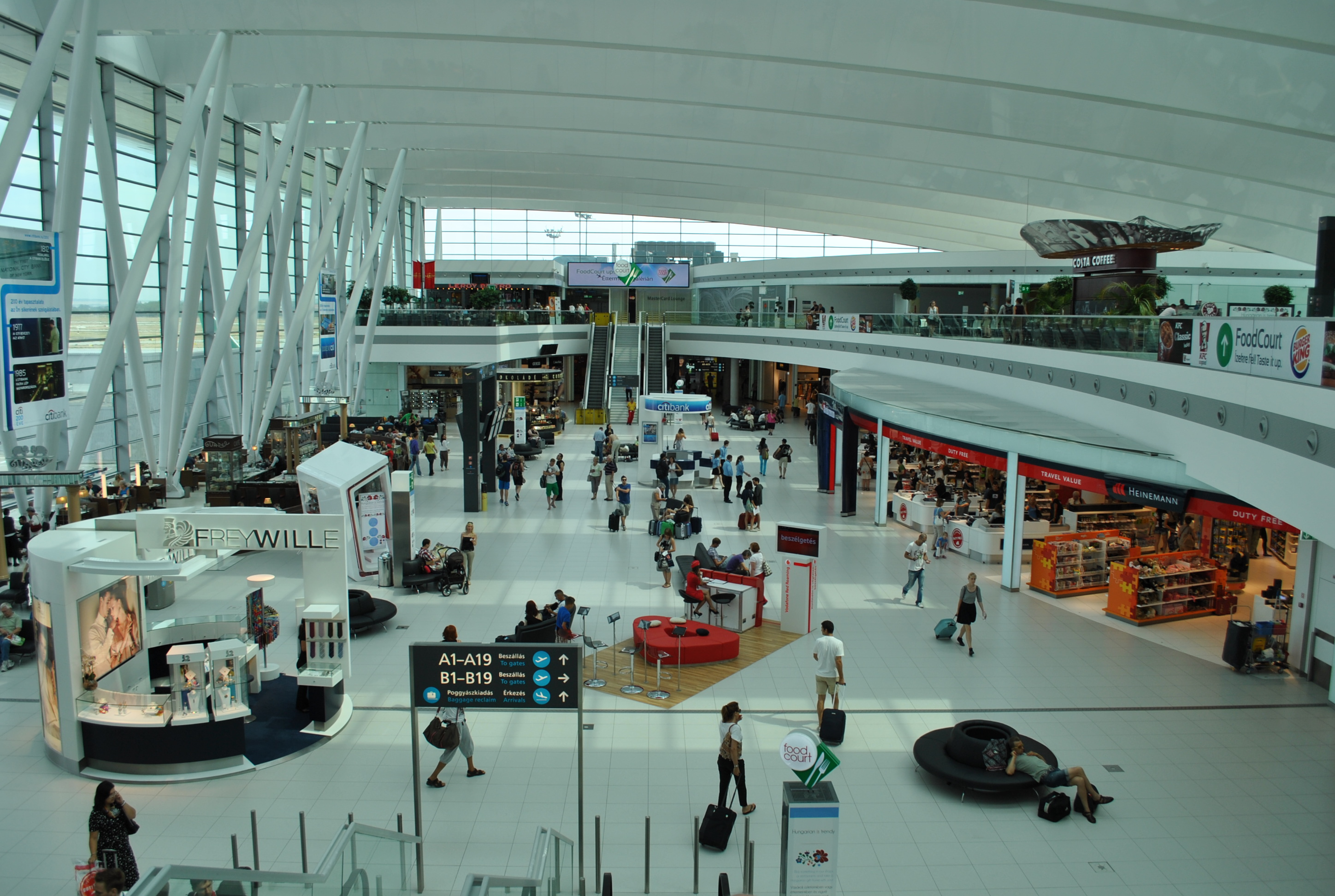
Sky Court interior

=== Terminal 1 ===
From 1 September 2005, the re-opened Terminal 1 served low-cost carriers. Terminal 1 was divided into Schengen and Non-Schengen boarding gates.

Being located within the premises of Budapest, it offered a faster public transport time to the city centre, compared to Terminal 2 about 3 kilometres farther. (Terminal 1 offered an approximately 20 minute direct train journey to Budapest city centre, while Terminal 2 requires an 8-minute bus ride to the train station).

=== Sky Court between Terminal 2A and 2B ===
Sky Court is a state-of-the-art building between terminals 2A and 2B with 5 levels. Passenger safety checks were moved here along with new baggage classifiers and business class lounges, such as the first MasterCard lounge in Europe.

== Future expansion and development (2026 - 2035) ==
=== Terminal 3 and rail link ===
In February 2026, construction began on a new terminal development, with a foundation stone ceremony attended by the VINCI Airports leadership and the then - Prime Minister Viktor Orbán, after an initial planning and preparation stage that had commenced in 2024, where Budapest Airport had outlined several features of the new 35,000m² terminal, which included a 19,000m² passenger pier, 13 new aircraft stands, and expanded security, check in, and retail areas. The project will also focus on general improvements to the wider airport infrastructure itself through expansion and modernisation upgrades focusing on the car parks and road networks leading to the terminals. Terminal 3 will have an environmentally - friendly and energy efficient design, aligning with the airport's 2030 net - zero emissions goal. As part of the 2.5 billion package cost, 1 billion euros have been allocated to the Terminal 3 project, and the remaining 1.5 billion euros will be used for the 27 km high - speed railway link to the city (1 billion euros) and road network improvements (500 million euros) to the terminal. The airport could accommodate an annual passenger count of 40 million upon completion of the project, up from the 19,632,894 passengers handled in 2025. The project is split into two phases, with the access road network to be completed by the end of 2028 according to schedule, and the Terminal 3 / rail link extension by 2035.

== Airlines and destinations ==
=== Passenger ===
As of July 2025, the following airlines operate regular scheduled and charter services to and from Budapest Ferenc Liszt Airport:

Airlines	Destinations
Aegean Airlines	Athens
Aer Lingus	Dublin
Air Algérie	Algiers
Air Cairo	Seasonal: Hurghada
Air Canada	Seasonal: Toronto–Pearson
Air China	Beijing–Capital, Chongqing
Air France	Paris–Charles de Gaulle
Air Serbia	Belgrade
airBaltic	Riga
AJet	Istanbul–Sabiha Gökçen
American Airlines	Seasonal: Philadelphia
Arkia	Tel Aviv
Asiana Airlines	Seoul–Incheon
Austrian Airlines	Vienna
Bluebird Airways	Tel Aviv
British Airways	London–Heathrow
Brussels Airlines	Brussels
China Southern Airlines	Guangzhou
Condor	Frankfurt
easyJet	Basel/Mulhouse, Bordeaux, Geneva, London–Gatwick, London–Southend, Lyon, Nantes, Paris–Charles de Gaulle
Egyptair	Cairo
El Al	Tel Aviv
Emirates	Dubai–International
Eurowings	Cologne/Bonn, Düsseldorf, Hamburg, Stuttgart
Finnair	Helsinki
flydubai	Dubai–International
Hainan Airlines	Shenzhen
Iberia	Madrid
Israir	Tel Aviv
Jazeera Airways	Seasonal: Kuwait City
Jet2.com	Birmingham, East Midlands, Leeds/Bradford, Manchester
KLM	Amsterdam
Korean Air	Seoul–Incheon
LOT Polish Airlines	Warsaw–Chopin
Lufthansa	Frankfurt, Munich
Luxair	Luxembourg
Norwegian Air Shuttle	Copenhagen, Oslo, Stockholm–Arlanda
Pegasus Airlines	Istanbul–Sabiha Gökcen
Qanot Sharq	Tashkent
Ryanair	Alicante, Athens, Barcelona, Bari, Belfast–International, Berlin, Birmingham, Bologna, Bristol, Brussels-Charleroi, Cagliari, Catania, Copenhagen, Dublin, Edinburgh, Gdańsk, Gran Canaria, Katowice, Lisbon, Liverpool, London–Stansted, Madrid, Málaga, Malta, Manchester, Marrakesh, Marseille, Milan-Bergamo, Milan–Malpensa, Naples, Newcastle upon Tyne, Palermo, Paphos, Paris-Beauvais, Pisa, Porto, Prague, Rome–Ciampino, Shannon, Stockholm–Arlanda, Sofia, Tenerife–South, Thessaloniki, Tirana, Toulouse, Treviso, Valencia, Turin, Venice, Warsaw–Modlin; Seasonal: Alghero, Amman–Queen Alia, Burgas, Castellón, Chania, Corfu, Dubrovnik, East Midlands, Faro, Gothenburg, Lamezia Terme, Lanzarote, Mykonos, Palma de Mallorca, Preveza/Lefkada, Rhodes, Rimini, Skiathos, Zadar, Zakynthos
Scandinavian Airlines	Copenhagen
SCAT Airlines	Şymkent
Shanghai Airlines	Ningbo, Shanghai–Pudong, Xi'an
Smartwings	Seasonal charter: Almeria, Barcelona, Bodrum, Dalaman, Fuerteventura, Palma de Mallorca, Preveza/Aktion, Sal, Taba, Tirana, Zakynthos
SunExpress	Seasonal: Antalya, İzmir
Swiss International Air Lines	Zürich
TAROM	Bucharest–Otopeni
TUI Airways	Seasonal: Birmingham, London–Gatwick, Manchester
Turkish Airlines	Istanbul
Wizz Air	Abu Dhabi, Alicante, Amman–Queen Alia, Ankara, Athens, Baku, Barcelona, Bari, Basel/Mulhouse, Bergen, Berlin, Bilbao, Billund, Brașov, Bucharest–Baneasa, Brussels-Charleroi, Catania, Chișinău, Copenhagen, Dortmund, Dubai–International, Eindhoven, Funchal, Gdańsk, Hurghada, Istanbul, Jeddah, Kalamata, Kutaisi, Larnaca, Lisbon, London–Gatwick, London–Luton, Madrid, Málaga, Malta, Marrakesh, Memmingen, Milan–Malpensa, Naples, Nice, Paris–Orly, Podgorica, Reykjavík–Keflavík, Rome–Fiumicino, Sharm El Sheikh, Skopje, Sofia, Stockholm–Arlanda, Stuttgart, Tallinn, Târgu Mureș, Tel Aviv, Tenerife–South, Thessaloniki, Turin, Valencia, Venice, Vilnius, Warsaw–Chopin, Wrocław, Yerevan; Seasonal: Antalya, Burgas, Corfu, Dubrovnik Genoa, Giza, Gran Canaria, Lamezia, Palma de Mallorca, Rimini, Salerno (begins 6 June 2027), Tirana, Zadar

=== Cargo ===
Airlines	Destinations
Cargolux	Ashgabat, Baku, Bangkok–Suvarnabhumi, Jakarta–Soekarno-Hatta, Hong Kong, Luxembourg, Shenzhen, Zhengzhou
China Cargo Airlines	Shanghai–Pudong
FedEx Express	Paris–Charles de Gaulle
Hungary Air Cargo	Zhengzhou
Korean Air Cargo	Frankfurt, Seoul–Incheon
Qatar Airways Cargo	Doha
SF Airlines	Ezhou
Sichuan Airlines Cargo	Almaty, Chengdu–Shuangliu
Turkish Cargo	Istanbul
UPS Airlines	Cologne/Bonn

== Statistics ==
=== Passenger numbers ===
Annual passenger statistics for Budapest Airport (2002 - 2025)
Year	Total Passengers	Aircraft Movements	Total Cargo (T)
2002	4,482,695	77,941	46,477
2003	5,022,538	88,471	50,545
2004	6,392,807	111,753	60,441
2005	7,932,765	126,359	55,519
2006	8,266,677	126,947	65,151
2007	8,597,137	124,298	68,144
2008	8,443,053	117,876	62,714
2009	8,095,367	109,811	54,355
2010	8,190,089	105,507	65,514
2011	8,920,653	109,949	69,683
2012 (Note: Malév Hungarian Airlines ceased operations on 3 February 2012.)	8,504,020	87,560	61,938
2013	8,520,880	83,830	64,284
2014	9,155,961	86,682	62,018
2015	10,298,963	92,294	65,986
2016	11,441,999	96,141	77,533
2017	13,097,223	102,745	87,341
2018	14,867,491	115,028	101,413
2019	16,173,489	122,813	95,595
2020	3,859,379	48,196	88,926
2021	4,622,882	55,197	125,844
2022	12,205,070	98,629	133,816
2023	14,701,090	108,068	142,762
2024	17,574,413	126,601	236,578
2025	19,632,894	138,710	363,120

Totals represent the sum of arrivals and departures as reported by the Hungarian Central Statistical Office.

=== Busiest routes ===
Top 10 busiest routes from Budapest in 2024
Rank	Airport	Passengers	Airlines
1	Istanbul	517,748	Turkish Airlines, Wizz Air
2	London–Stansted	498,175	Ryanair
3	Frankfurt	482,651	Lufthansa
4	Barcelona	482,054	Ryanair, Smartwings, Wizz Air
5	Tel Aviv	466,757	arkia, Bluebird Airways, El Al, FLYYO, Israir, Ryanair, Wizz Air
6	London–Luton	453,440	Wizz Air
7	Amsterdam	442,559	KLM
8	Milan–Malpensa	425,516	Ryanair, Wizz Air
9	Dubai	382,692	Emirates, flydubai, Wizz Air
10	Madrid	380,381	Iberia, Ryanair, Wizz Air

== Other facilities ==
- Wizz Air has its head office in Building 221. Wizz Air signed the lease agreement in October 2010 and moved there in June 2011 with 150 employees. The airline occupies over 2,000 square metres (22,000 sq ft) of space in an office building refurbished after the airline's arrival. The facility, with open plan offices, houses about 150 employees. In addition, Farnair Hungary has its head office on the airport property.
- Malév Hungarian Airlines signed a lease agreement with the airport in the spring of 2011, agreeing to relocate its headquarters to the airport grounds by the summer of 2012.

== Ground transportation ==
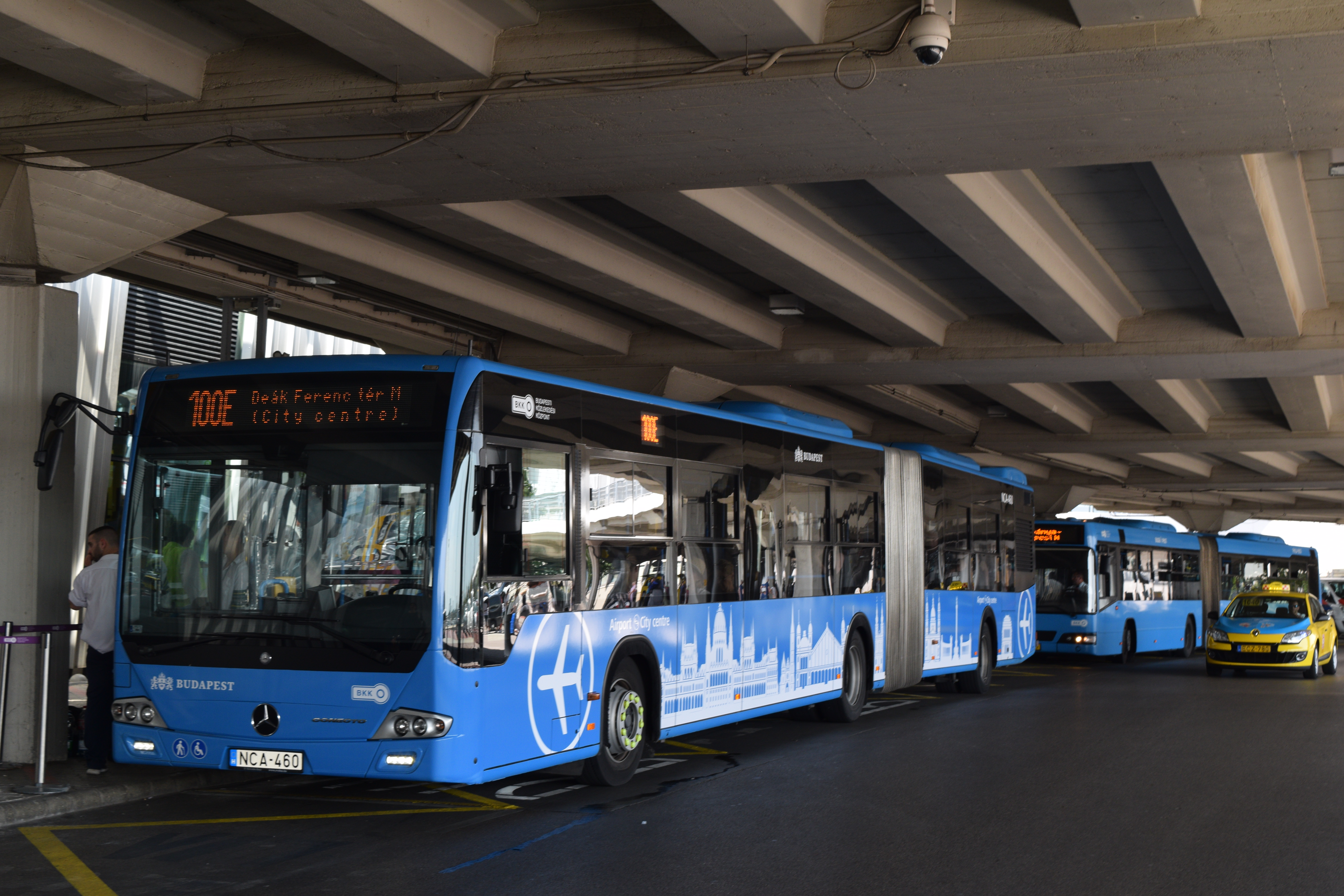
100E Airport Express bus station at Terminal 2 (Arrivals level)

=== Public Transport ===
Bus: The 100E Airport Express bus runs 24/7 direct shuttle services between Terminal 2 and Deák Ferenc tér in central Budapest, with a travel time of approximately 35 minutes, with stops at Kálvin tér and the Astoria intersection. Alternatively, the 200E public bus connects Terminal 2 to the Kőbánya-Kispest metro station, where passengers can connect to Metro Line M3 into the city.

Route of express line 100E (Terminal 2 - Kálvin tér - Astoria intersection - Deák Ferenc tér)

Rail: Ferihegy railway station located approximately 6.5 km away from Terminal 2 and connected by the 200E bus offers direct rail services to the Budapest Nyugati railway terminal. Future rail upgrades on this route include a €1 billion investment, with 27 km of railway track to be constructed between Kőbánya-Kispest and Monor with a station at Terminal 2A/2B and the new Terminal 3 branching off the main line. This will establish a direct rail link between Terminal 2 and central Budapest; Phase 1 running directly from Kőbánya-Kispest to Terminal 2 is set to open by 2030 / 2031, and the Phase 2 extension to Monor is scheduled for completion by 2034.

=== Taxis and shuttles ===
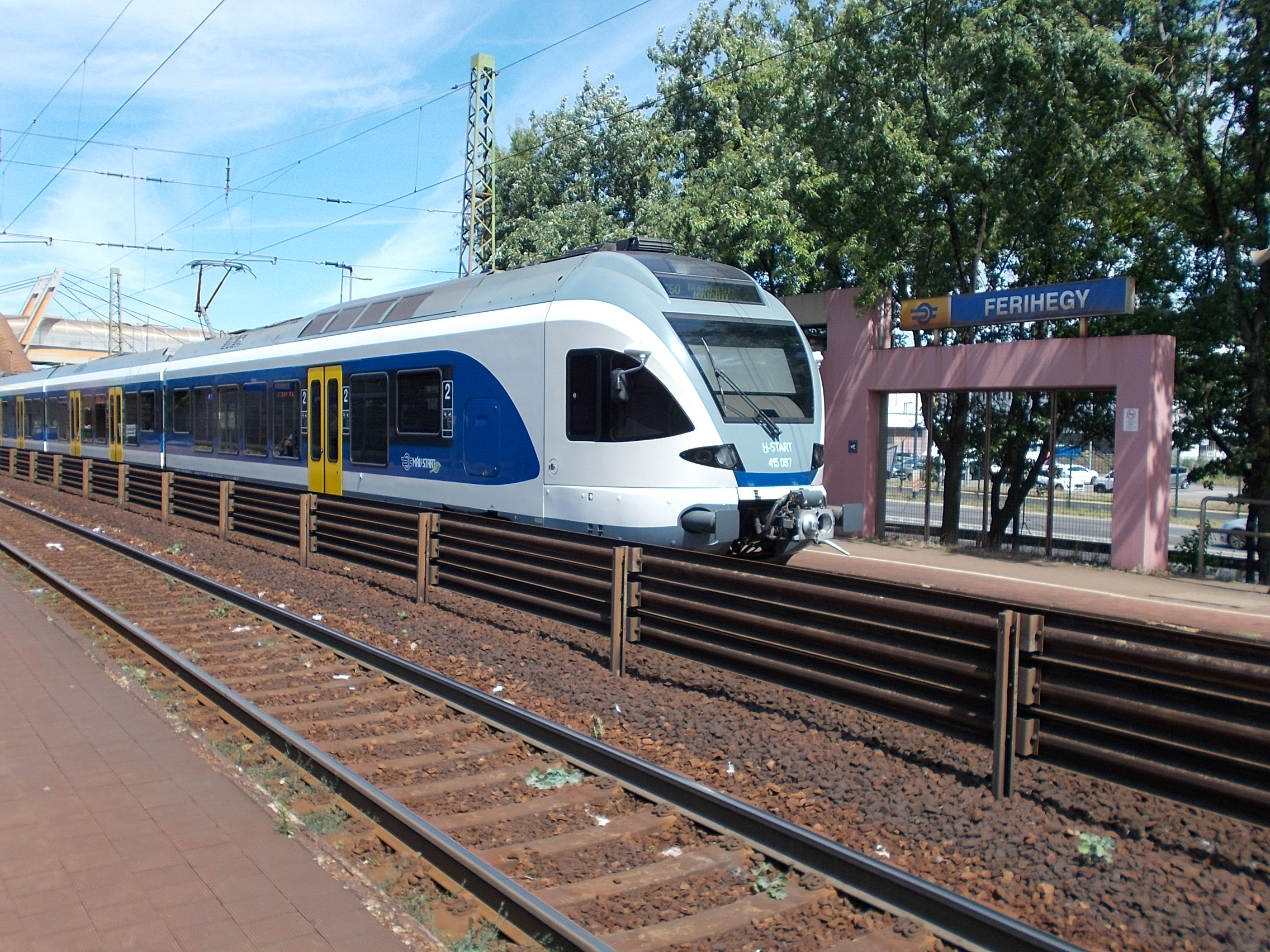
Ferihegy railway station

Budapest Airport's official Taxi partner is Főtaxi, with booking stands at the entrances of Terminals 2A and 2B used to make a reservation; a taxi rank is located just outside the terminal stands to which passengers can proceed to upon booking. Uber also operates from the airport, with pickups available from both Terminal 2A for general reservations and Terminal 2B for XL vehicles. BUD's official airport shuttle service provider, miniBUD, offers door - to - door shared / private transfer shuttles to the city centre.

== Accidents and incidents ==
- On 6 August 1961, a Malév Hungarian Airlines Douglas C-47A crashed into a residential area during a sightseeing flight. All 4 crew and 23 passengers were killed along with 3 on the ground.
- On 15 January 1975, Malév Hungarian Airlines Flight 801A, an Ilyushin IL-18, a ferry/positioning flight, crashed 1360m beyond runway 31 and 120m left of the centerline because of bad weather, darkness, fog, lack of crew coordination and possible spatial orientation. All 9 occupants died.
- On 22 February 1994, a Malev Hungarian Airlines Tupolev TU-134 caught fire on the ground during a maintenance check at Budapest Airport. Four maintenance technicians died.

== See also ==
- Debrecen International Airport
- List of airports in Hungary
- Transport in Hungary
- Aeropark Aviation Museum
