= Aviaexpress =

IATA	ICAO	Call sign
RX	AEH	Avex
- Commenced operations: 1988
- Ceased operations: 2003
- Fleet size: 2

Aviaexpress was a Hungarian regional airline.

== Fleet ==
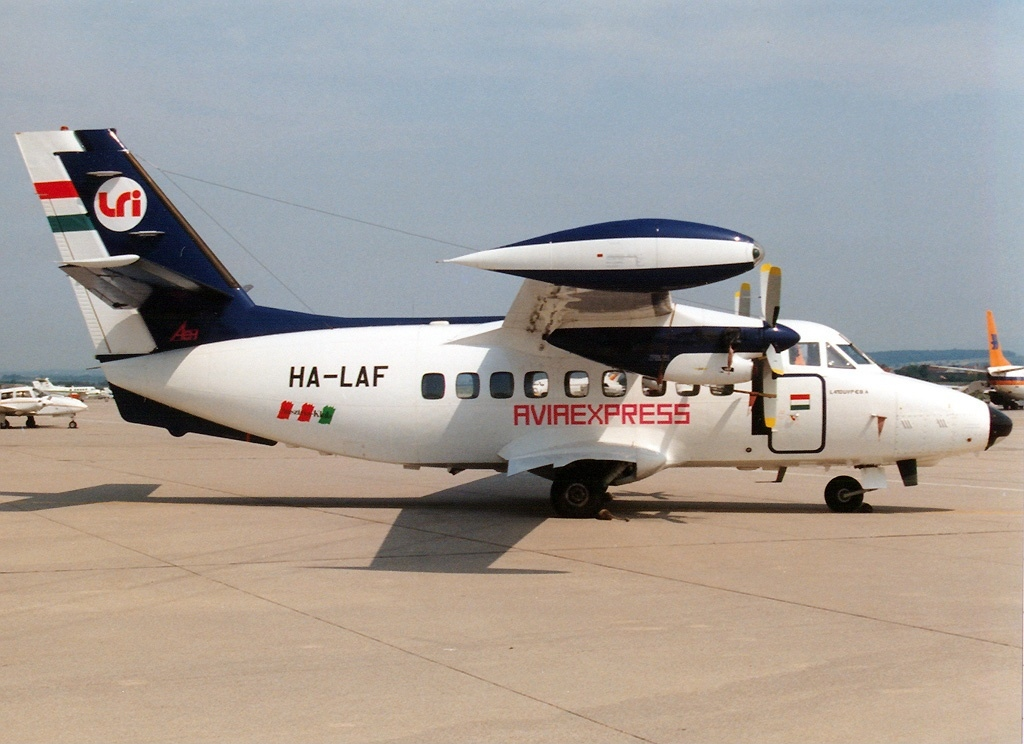
Aviaexpress Let L-410 UVP

As of August 2006 the Aviaexpress fleet included the following aircraft:

- 2 Let L-410 UVP
