= Kispest =

19th District of Budapest Budapest XIX. kerülete Kispest
- District of Budapest
- District XIX
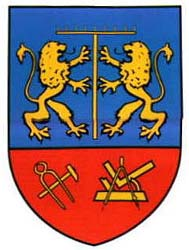
- Flag Coat of arms

- Location of District XIX in Budapest (shown in grey)
- Coordinates: 47°27′N 19°08′E
- Country: Hungary
- Region: Central Hungary
- City: Budapest
- Established: 1 January 1950
- Quarters: List: Kispest; Wekerletelep

Government
  - Mayor: Péter Gajda (MSZP)

Area
  - Total: 9.38 km^{2} (3.62 sq mi)
  - Rank: 18th

Population (2016)
  - Total: 60,731
  - Rank: 15th
  - Density: 6,480/km^{2} (16,800/sq mi)
- Demonym: tizenkilencedik kerületi ("19th districter")
- Time zone: UTC+1 (CET)
  - Summer (DST): UTC+2 (CEST)
- Postal code: 1191 ... 1196
- Website: uj.kispest.hu

Kispest (Hungarian pronunciation: [ˈkiʃpɛʃt], lit. Little Pest) is the 19th (XIX) district of Budapest, Hungary. It lies south-southeast of the historical Pest city. It was founded in 1871 on rural land as a village at the borderline of Pest, so it was named Kispest ("Little Pest").

== History ==
From 1880 to 1990 Kispest's population increased from 1820 to 72,838. Kispest became part of Greater Budapest in 1950. When the Soviet troops re-entered Budapest to subdue the civil uprising in October/November 1956, they approached the city centre from the south-east, up the Üllői Street, with some of the first street clashes taking place in Kispest.

The huge panel housing estate (Kispest microdistrict) was built between the 1960s and the 1980s (12,100 flats, c. 33,000 inhabitants, making it the sixth-biggest housing estate/microraion in Budapest).

== Wekerletelep ==
Wekerletelep is Kispest's suburb with detached houses and green areas. It was named after the Hungarian premier at the time of the development in the 1900s, Sándor Wekerle. Its central square, Kós Károly Tér, has two characteristic architectural gateways designed by the architect Károly Kós and based on Transylvanian building style. In May every year a festival called Wekerle Days (Hu: Wekerle Napok) takes place. This involves fun run, sports events, concerts and various other cultural and family oriented programs for all age groups.

== Public transport ==
The district is served by the Metro 3 (Kőbánya-Kispest and Határ út stations), so there is direct connection with the city center. Határ út underground station is the third-busiest in the city (after Deák Square and Örs vezér tere) with an estimated 40,000 passengers using it (often twice) on a typical workday.

== Sport ==
Ferenc Puskás played football for Kispest F.C. (then called Kispest Honvéd FC) in the 1950s.

- Kispest Honvéd FC, football team
- Kispesti Textil SE, defunct football team

Kispest NKK, women's handball team, NB1/B second league

== List of mayors ==
Member	Party	Date
Levente Lévay	SZDSZ	1990–1994
Gábor Zupkó	Fidesz	1994–1998
Béla Timár	Fidesz	1998–2002
Katalin Steinerné Török	MSZP	2002–2006
Péter Gajda	MSZP	2006–

Party	Seats	Current District Assembly
Opposition coalition (Note: Coalition of Momentum–DK–MSZP–Dialogue–LMP.)	12	M
Fidesz-KDNP	4	
MKKP	1	

== Twin towns – sister cities ==
Kispest is twinned with:

- Krzeszowice, Poland
- Pendik, Turkey
- Smolyan, Bulgaria
- Sombor, Serbia
- Tășnad, Romania
- Vrbovec, Croatia

== Gallery ==
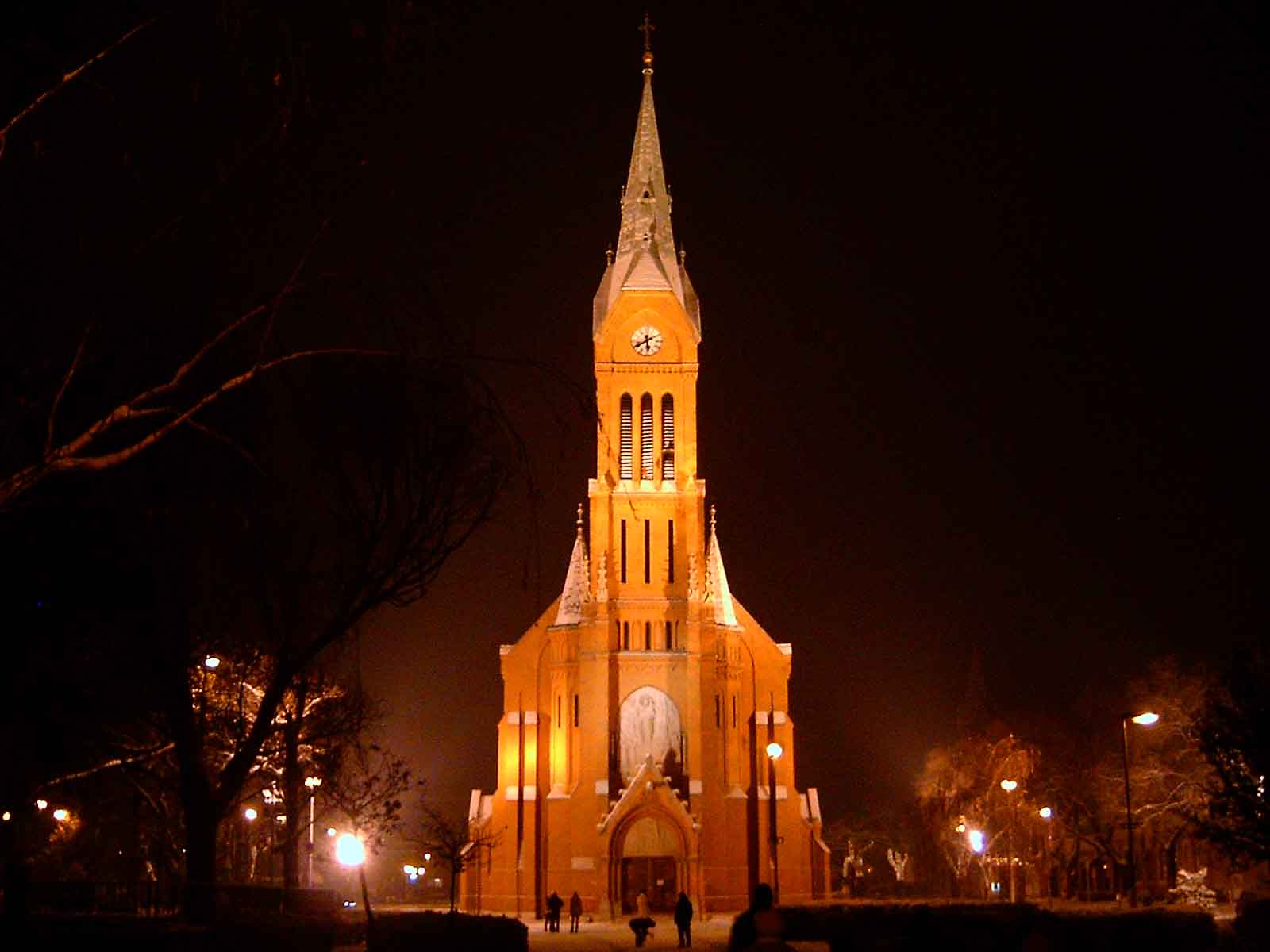
The church of Saint Mary of the Assumption in Kispest

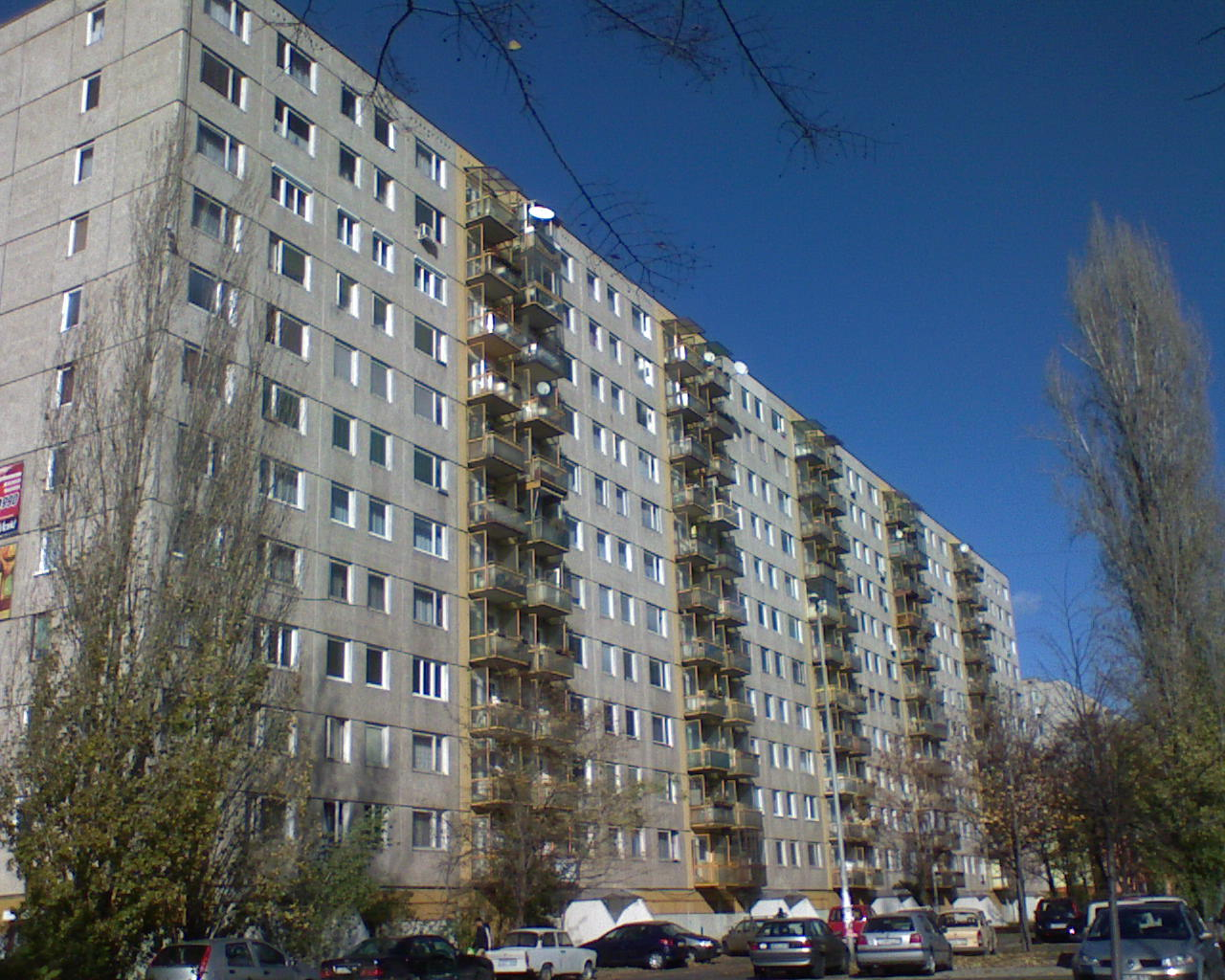
Kispest housing estate

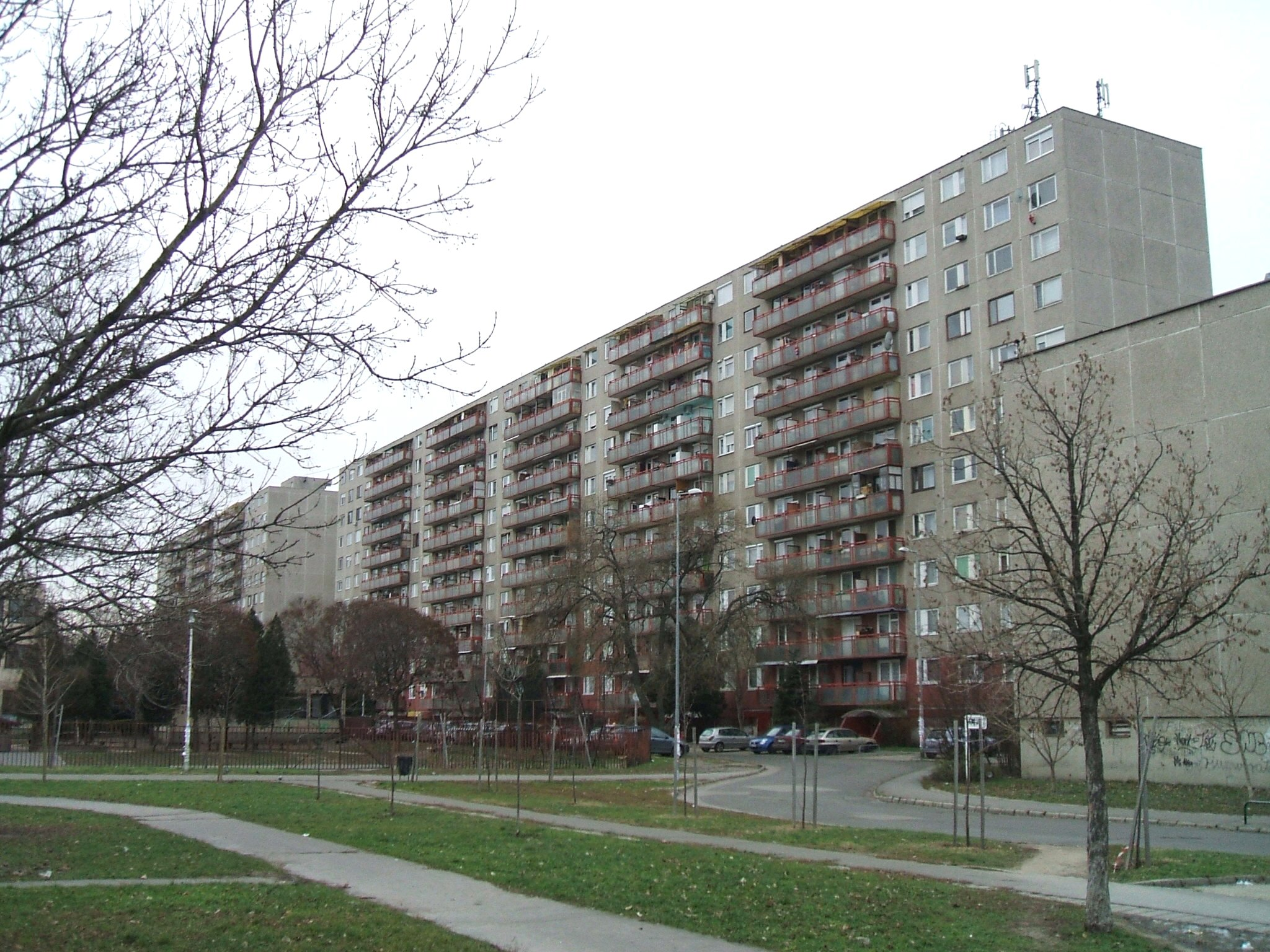
A panel block next to Kőbánya-Kispest metro station
