= Pöttyös utca metro station =

Budapest metro station

Pöttyös utca
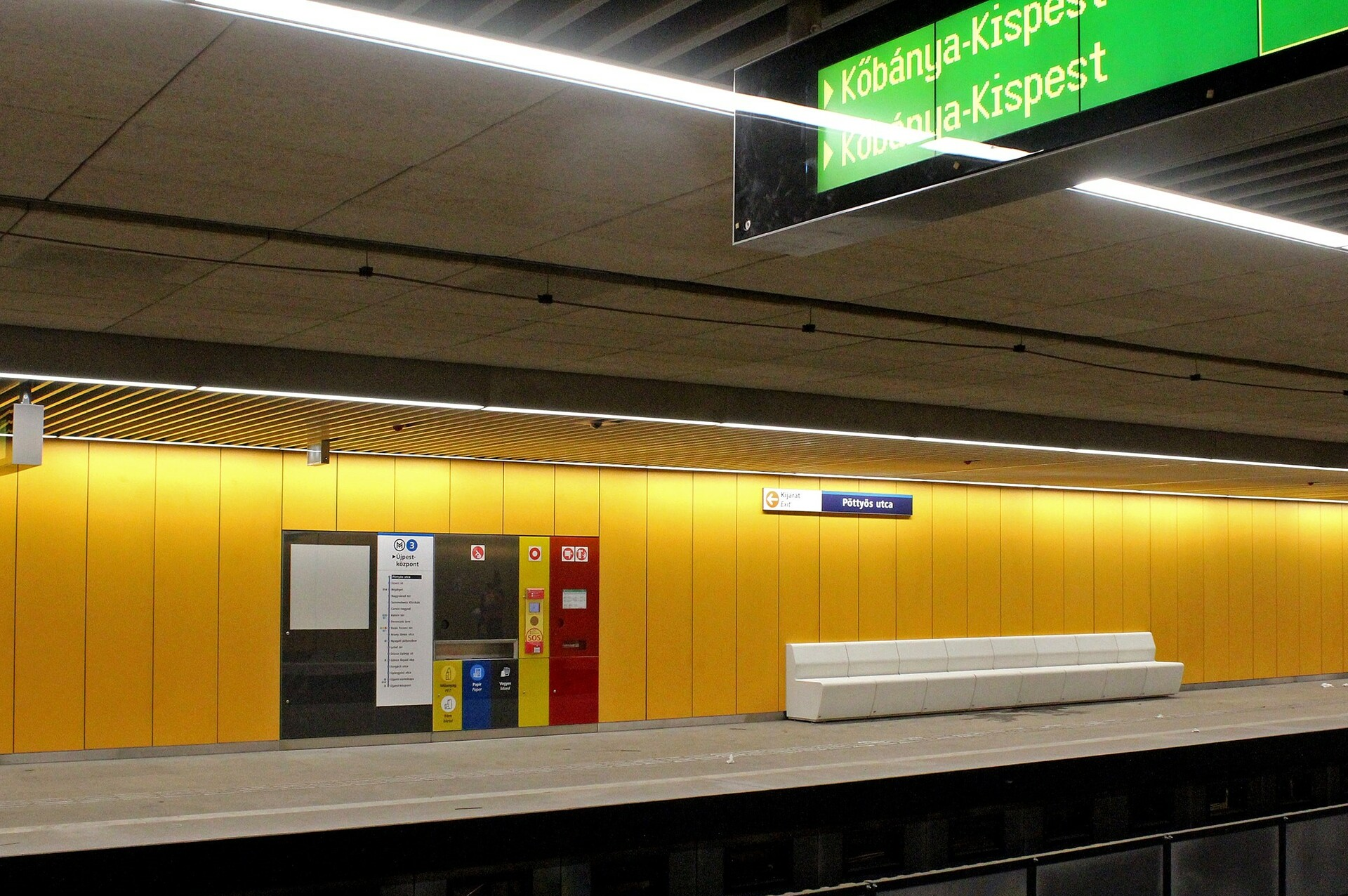

General information
- Location: Budapest; Hungary
- Coordinates: 47°28′07″N 19°07′01″E
- System: Budapest Metro station
- Platforms: 2 side platforms

Construction
- Structure type: cut-and-cover underground
- Depth: 5.6 m (18 ft)

History
- Opened: 29 March 1980
- Rebuilt: 22 October 2020

Services
Preceding station	Budapest Metro	Following station
Határ út towards Kőbánya-Kispest	Line 3	Ecseri út towards Újpest-központ
Location

Pöttyös utca (lit. Spotted street) is a station on the M3 (North-South) Line of the Budapest Metro. Next to the station, there is a huge socialist housing estate (microraion), which named after Attila József. The station was opened on 20 April 1980 as part of the extension from Nagyvárad tér to Kőbánya-Kispest.
