= Ferencváros Stadion =

Multi-purpose stadium in Ferencváros, Budapest, Hungary

Coordinates: 47°28′32″N 19°5′43″E

- Groupama Aréna
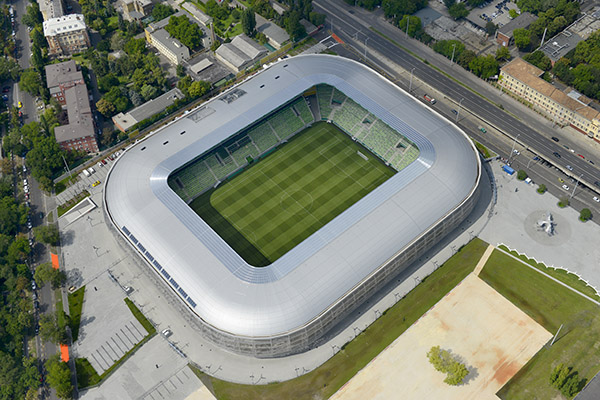
- UEFA
- Interactive map of Ferencváros Stadion
- Location: Ferencváros, Budapest, Hungary
- Owner: Hungarian State
- Operator: Lagardère Group
- Capacity: 23,700 (22,122 for international matches)
- Executive suites: 34 skybox
- Surface: Grass; Field
- Record attendance: 22,060 (sport); Hungary 0–0 Romania; UEFA Euro 2016 qualifying
- Field size: 105 m × 68 m (344 ft × 223 ft)
- Public transit: Népliget

Construction
- Groundbreaking: 27 March 2013
- Built: 2013–14
- Opened: 10 August 2014
- Cost: c. 13,5 billion HUF (€40 million)
- Architects: Ágnes Streit; Szabolcs Kormos
- Main contractor: Market Építő Zrt.

Tenants
- Ferencváros (2014–present); Hungary national football team (2014–2019); MOL Vidi FC (2018) (European competitions matches)

Website
- www.groupamaarena.com

The Ferencváros Stadion, also known as the Groupama Aréna for sponsorship purposes, is a multi-purpose stadium in Ferencváros, Budapest, Hungary and the home of Ferencvárosi TC. With a capacity of 22,000, it was for a time the largest stadium in Hungary (between the demolition of the larger Ferenc Puskás Stadium in 2017 and the opening of the Puskás Aréna in November 2019). It was built on the site of the former Flórián Albert Stadium, the club's previous home, which was demolished in 2013.

The French insurance group Groupama purchased the naming rights to the stadium. However, the name cannot be used when hosting FIFA and UEFA events, since these governing bodies have policies forbidding corporate sponsorship from companies that are not official tournament partners.

== History ==
=== Planning ===
Since 1911, Ferencváros had played their home games at Stadion Albert Flórián, originally named Üllői úti Stadion. The stadium had had a major upgrade from 1971 to 1974, and in the 21st century the club desired a stadium with an expanded capacity. Reconstruction of Stadion Albert Flórián was rejected for financial reasons, and plans to demolish the stadium and replace it with an entirely new structure were presented at a press conference in April 2012 by Gábor Kubatov, the president of Ferencváros. The proposed capacity of 22,600 would make it the second biggest stadium in Hungary.

The new stadium would be reorientated 90° and closer to Gyáli út, with a pitch 10 cm below ground level. Corporate hospitality, a restaurant, shop and museum were all planned, along with expanded changing facilities.

=== Construction ===
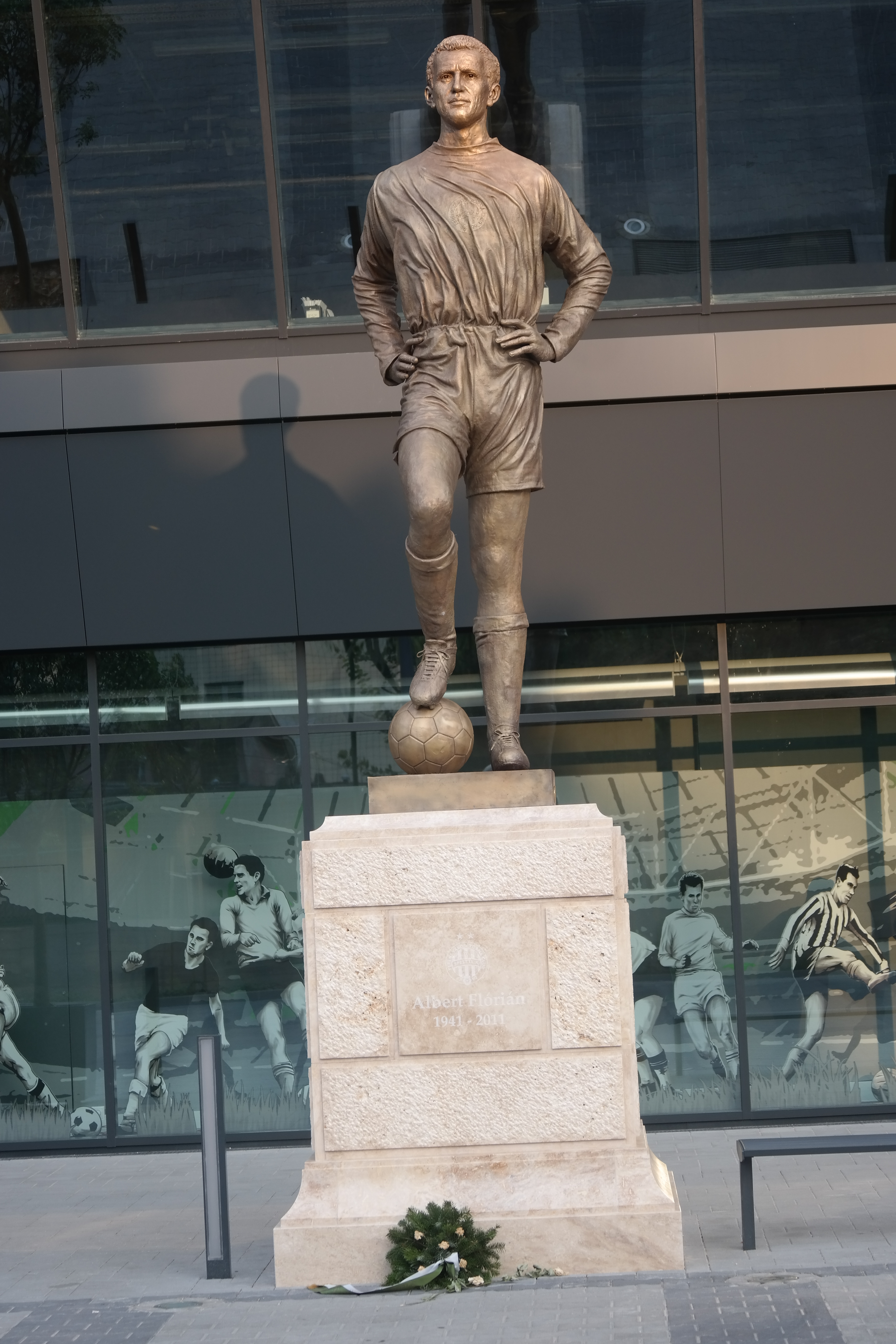
The statue of the 1967 Ballon d'Or-winner Flórián Albert (1941–2011) in front of the main entrance

Market építő Zrt won the tender to construct the stadium, with a projected cost of 13.5 billion Ft. Construction started on 28 March 2013, with an estimated completion time of autumn 2014.

On 24 May 2013, Balázs Fürjes, MP of the Hungarian Parliament and person responsible for the investment, announced that the stadium would be finished on time. The construction of the new stadium is expected to be completed by the fall of 2014. In 2013 there will be 5,4 billion HUF available for the project and 8,1 billion HUF in 2014. Mihály Varga, minister of national economy of Hungary, said that the sale of the estate, which will be gained by rotating the stadium by 90°, will cover the expenses of the stadium. If the construction is not completed on time, the constructor company (Market Épitő Zrt.) will have to pay 65 million HUF daily.

Melinda Várkonyi said that an 82-millimetre grenade was found at the building site of the new stadium. Allegedly the shell originates from a Soviet grenade launcher from the Second World War.

On 3 October 2013, Balázs Fürjes, MP of the Hungarian Parliament, said that the construction of the stadium is of record speed. It was quite sure that the club could start the 2014–15 Hungarian League season in the new stadium. The Ferencváros club centre was opened, where the fans of the club can take a look at the plans of the new stadium or a 3D film can be watched about the future stadium. Balázs Fürjes also pointed out that the new stadium will be a multi-purpose stadium where concerts, conferences, cultural events can be held apart from association football matches. He also mentioned that the elements of the old Albert stadium will be used for the construction of the new stadium. Therefore, it is a green investment for two reasons: for the colours of the club, and for the eco-friendly construction. The steel structure, which weighs 2800 tons, was made in Kecskemét while the concrete structure, which is 25,000 cubic metres, was made in Dunaújváros. The construction of the new stadium gives jobs for almost 2000 blue-collar workers.

On 17 January 2014, new photos about the new stadium were released on the Facebook site of the Albert Stadium.

On 18 April 2014, it was announced that a 3-metre-tall statue of Ferencváros Ballon d'Or winner Flórián Albert will be erected in front of the main entrance. Sándor Kligl, sculptor and artist, was asked to make the bronze statue. The artist also said that he saw playing the Ferencváros legend live and it was worth going to the stadium just because of him. He was commissioned with many different tasks but this has been the most special one in his life. Junior Flórián Albert said that it was a moving moment to look at his father statue.

In April 2014, Lagardère Unlimited Stadium Solutions, the dedicated agency for stadia and arena operations owned by Lagardère Unlimited, signed a long-term naming right contract with and French insurer Groupama. The deal includes the operation, management and marketing of the new arena. Lagardère Unlimited Stadium Solutions is currently involved in consulting, operations and marketing services in several stadiums worldwide, including Commerzbank-Arena in Frankfurt, Imtech Arena in Hamburg and two stadiums in Brazil. On 2 July 2014, it was announced that the name of the new stadium would be the Groupama Arena.

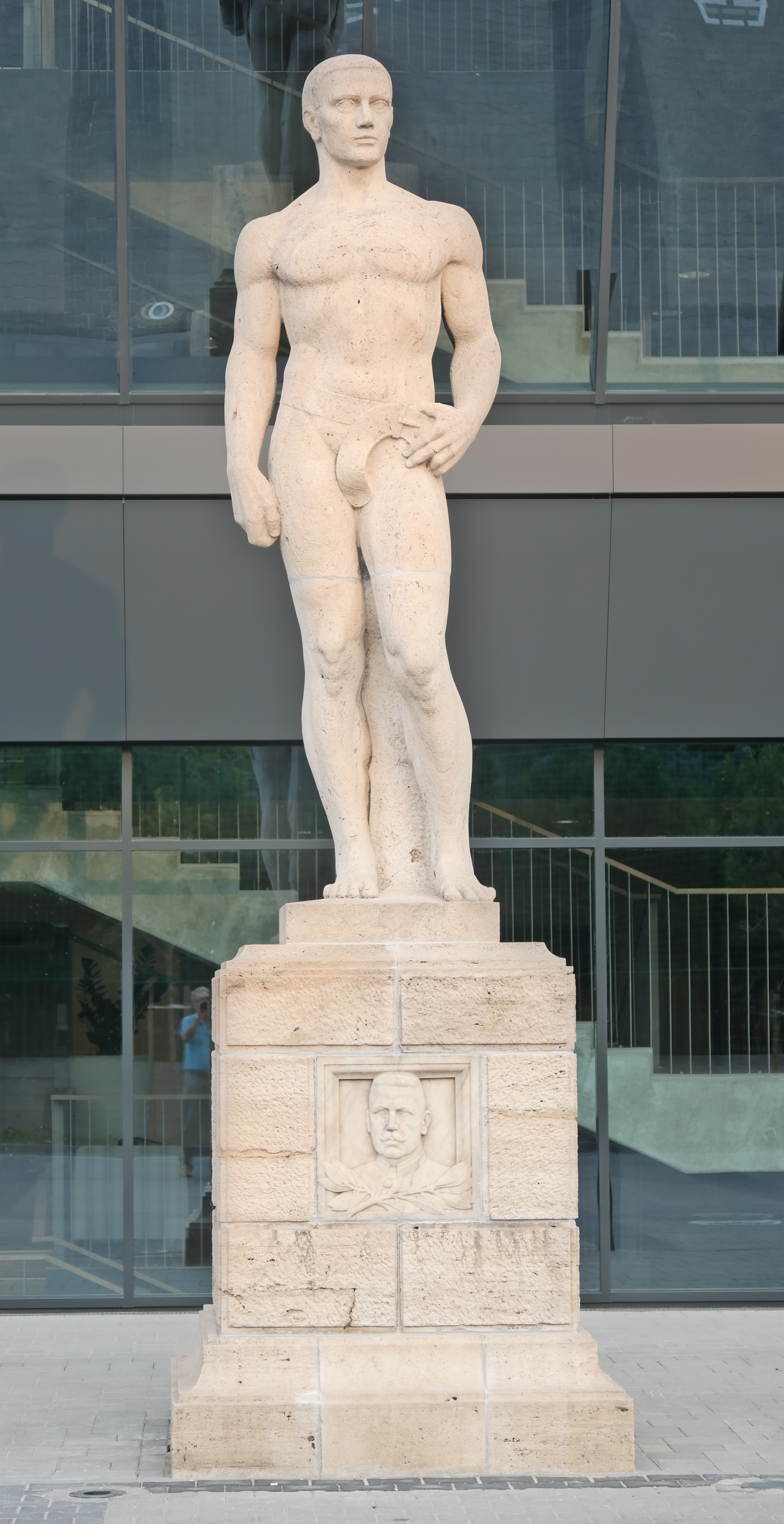
The Springer statue, the first president of Ferencváros

On 7 July 2014, it was announced that the first kick would be executed by Ferencváros legend, Ferenc Rudas.

It was revealed that one of the halls will be named after former Ferencváros and Barcelona legend László Kubala who played for Ferencváros between 1945 and 1946 and scored 33 goals in 50 matches.

On 4 August 2014, the first unofficial match was played at the stadium in front of 6,500 spectators. Ferencváros old-boys team including Szeiler, Dzurják, Lipcsei, Telek, and Lisztes hosted their arch-rival Újpest old-boys including Kovács, Szlezák, Fehér, Egressy, and Mészöly. The final result was 6–5 to Újpest. The tickets for free those supporters who purchased season tickets before the match and for the workers and their relatives who contributed to the construction of the new stadium.

On 10 August 2014, Ferencváros played the opening match against Chelsea F.C. The first goal at the new stadium was scored by Ferencváros Legened, Zoltán Gera in the 17th minute. However, in the second half Ramires (51st minute) and Fàbregas scored (81st minute) which resulted the 2–1 defeat at the new stadium for the home side.

On 10 August 2014, around 2,500 spectators belonging to the B Közép organised an alternative match at the stadium of BKV Előre SC in protest against the high entrance fees earmarked by the leadership of Ferencváros, the entrance security checks, and that Chelsea would play the opening match against Ferencváros and not the Austrian archrival Rapid Wien. The two teams included the supporters of Ferencváros and Rapid Wien.

On 24 August 2014, the first Hungarian League match was played at the stadium. Ferencváros beat Nyíregyháza 3–1. The first goal was scored by Busai in the 13th minute.

On 7 September 2014, Hungary played their first match at the stadium against Northern Ireland. The UEFA Euro 2016 qualifier ended with a 2–1 away victory.

On 14 November 2014, Hungary won their first match at the new stadium by beating Finland 1–0 thanks to Gera's 84th-minute goal in the UEFA Euro 2016 qualifier.

On 9 July 2015, Ferencváros played their first international match at the stadium against Dutch club Go Ahead Eagles in the second leg of the first qualifying round of the 2015–16 UEFA Europa League, with Ferencváros winning 4–1.

On 20 May 2016 the first non-UEFA member was hosted in the stadium when Hungary played against Ivory Coast in a goalless friendly tier.

On 22 September 2017, it was announced that the first CONCACAF member to play at the stadium will be national team of Costa Rica.

The final of the 2018–19 UEFA Women's Champions League was held at the stadium on 18 May 2019.

== Sport arena ==
The stadium was categorised as a Category 4 facility by the UEFA which is suitable for Nemzeti Bajnokság I, Magyar Kupa, UEFA European Championship qualifying, FIFA World Cup qualification, UEFA Champions League group stage and quarter-final. In addition, the stadium can host FIFA U-17 World Cup and U21 FIFA U20 World Cup.

The capacity of the arena is 23,800 for Nemzeti Bajnokság I and Magyar Kupa matches and 22,000 for UEFA and FIFA matches. The difference is due to the fact that there are standing stands in the B-közép and the visitors sector. The area of the stadium is 19,042 square metres, including the pitch it is 28,746.5 square metres. The main building has four floors, and under it there is a three-level garage which can host 354 vehicles. There is a car park in front of the main building which can host 106 cars. Next to the stadium there is also a parking lot which can host 405 cars.

The construction took 14 months. During the construction 60 000 cubic metre was moved. The amount of the concrete used in the construction was 24 492 cubic metre, while the steel structure was 2708 tons. The steel structure was manufactured in Kecskemét, while the pre-fabricated concrete was made in Dunaújváros.

=== Construction costs ===
The stadium cost 53.3 million USD. The price per seat was 1,996 USD. In 2014, the arena was the fifth cost-per-seat building and sixth by price in Hungary. Nagyerdei Stadion of Debrecen overtook in cost, but not in cost-per-seat.

== Tenants ==
Székesfehérvár-based MOL Vidi FC played their home matches of the 2018–19 UEFA Europa League group stage against BATE Borisov, PAOK FC, and Chelsea F.C. in the stadium due to the reconstruction of Sóstói Stadion.

== Music ==
Besides football, the stadium can be configured to hold many other events, particularly major concerts but also private events like weddings and conferences. The first concert at the new stadium was given by Depeche Mode on 22 May 2017.

=== Concerts ===
List of concerts
Year	Date	Main act(s)	Opening act(s)	Tour / Concert name	Tickets sold
2017	22 May	Depeche Mode	—N/a	Global Spirit Tour	25,200
2017	23 August	Robbie Williams	—N/a	The Heavy Entertainment Show Tour	

== Facilities and innovations ==
=== Fradi Museum ===
On 7 August 2014, The Fradi Museum was opened. The visitors to the museum can get acquainted with the history of Ferencváros. Cups, trophies and flags can be seen at the museum such as Flórián Albert's 1967 Ballon d'Or, the trophy of the 1937 Mitropa Cup, Tibor Nyilasi's Silver shoe, and the trophy of the 1965 Inter-Cities Fairs Cup Final along with many other trophies and cups in connection with the club can be seen.

=== Cashless catering ===
The Cashless catering system is used in the premises of the entire stadium.

=== Vascular technology ===
The arena has been the first stadium in Hungary where vein matching or vascular technology has been installed.

== Transport ==
Groupama Arena is located in the ninth district of Budapest, Hungary. The arena can be approached by Budapest Metro Line 3. The nearest Metro station is called Népliget.

Service	Station/Stop	Line/Route	Walking distance from Groupama Arena
Budapest Metro	Népliget	Blue	100 m 2 mins
Budapest tram	Népliget	1	100 m 2 mins
Budapest Bus	Népliget	254E; 901; 914; 914A; 918; 937; 950	100 m 2 mins

== Milestone matches ==
10 August 2014	Ferencváros (Hungary)	1–2	(England) Chelsea	Friendly match (Opening match)
	Gera 17'	(Report)	Ramires 51'; Fàbregas 81'	Attendance: 20,000; Referee: István Vad (Hungary)

24 August 2014	Ferencváros (Hungary)	3–1	(Hungary) Nyíregyháza	2014–15 Nemzeti Bajnokság I (First Nemzeti Bajnokság I match)
	Busai 13'; Gera 28'; Mateos 67'	(Report)	Bajzát 78'	Attendance: 12,128; Referee: István Vad (Hungary)

17 September 2014	Ferencváros (Hungary)	2–0	(Hungary) Zalaegerszeg	2014–15 Ligakupa (First Ligakupa match)
	Ugrai 34'; Nagy 82'	(Report)		Attendance: 437; Referee: József Berger (Hungary)

4 March 2015	Ferencváros (Hungary)	5–0	(Hungary) Csákvár	2014–15 Magyar Kupa (First Magyar Kupa match)
	Busai 7' 62' 70'; Lamah 37'; Ramírez 64'	(Report)		Attendance: 3,514; Referee: Karakó (Hungary)

9 July 2015	Ferencváros (Hungary)	4–1	(Netherlands) Go Ahead Eagles	2015–16 Europa League (First Europa League match)
	Gera 4'; Böde 20'; Busai 45'; Haraszti 89'	(Report)	Türüç 90+3'	Attendance: 0 Referee: TBD

20 July 2016	Ferencváros (Hungary)	1–1 (a.e.t.) (1–3 p)	(Albania) Partizani Tirana	2016–17 Champions League (First Champions League match)
19:30	Gera 14' (pen.)	Report	Hüsing 40' (o.g.)	Attendance: 8,752; Referee: Kristo Tohver (Estonia)
	Penalties
	Gera (penalty missed); Šesták (penalty missed); Nagy (penalty scored); Ramírez (penalty missed)		(penalty scored) Hoxha; (penalty missed) Vila; (penalty scored) Trashi; (penalty scored) Ekuban

== Magyar Kupa finals ==
20 May 2015	Videoton	0–4	Ferencváros	2015 Magyar Kupa Final
		(Report)	Varga 53'; Batik 60'; Lamah 53'; Szolnoki 86' (og.)	Attendance: 15,127; Referee: Zoltán Iványi (Hungary)

7 May 2016	Újpest	0–1	Ferencváros	2016 Magyar Kupa Final
		(Report)	Gera 79'	Attendance: 19,000; Referee: Zoltán Iványi (Hungary)

31 May 2017	Vasas	1–1 (a.e.t.) (4–5 p)	Ferencváros	2017 Magyar Kupa Final
(CEST) 20:30	Kulcsár 47'	Report	26' Varga	Attendance: 14,970; Referee: Péter Solymosi
	Penalties
	Remili (penalty scored); Berecz (penalty scored); Ristevski (penalty missed); Vida (penalty scored); Gaál (penalty scored)		(penalty scored) Varga; (penalty scored) Leandro; (penalty scored) Radó; (penalty scored) Sternberg; (penalty scored) Cukic

23 May 2018	Puskás Akadémia	2–2 (a.e.t.) (4–5 p)	Újpest	2018 Magyar Kupa Final
20:00 CEST	Knežević 38'; Perošević 66'		Zsótér 55'; Bojović 63'	Attendance: 11270

25 May 2019	Honvéd	1–2	MOL Vidi	2019 Magyar Kupa Final
	Holender 14' (pen.)	(Report)	Šćepović 79' Hadžić 90+1'	Attendance: 12,777; Referee: Zoltán Iványi (Hungary)

== Hungary national football team matches ==
7 September 2014 Euro 2016 Q	Hungary	1–2	Northern Ireland
18:00 CET	Priskin 75'	Report	McGinn 81'; K. Lafferty 88'	Attendance: 20,672; Referee: Deniz Aytekin (Germany)

14 November 2014 Euro 2016 Q	Hungary	1–0	Finland
20:45 CET	Gera 84'	Report		Attendance: 19,500; Referee: Clément Turpin (France)

18 November 2014 Friendly match	Hungary	1–2	Russia
20:30 CET	Nikolić 86'	Report	Ignashevich 49'; Kerzhakov 80'	Attendance: 4,000; Referee: Cüneyt Çakır (Turkey)

29 March 2015 Euro 2016 Q	Hungary	0–0	Greece
20:45 CET		Report		Attendance: 22,000; Referee: Sergei Karasev (Russia)

4 September 2015 Euro 2016 Q	Hungary	0–0	Romania
20:45 CET		Report		Attendance: 22,060; Referee: Felix Brych (Germany)

8 October 2015 Euro 2016 Q	Hungary	2–1	Faroe Islands
20:45 CET	Böde 63', 71'	Report	Jakobsen 11'	Attendance: 16,175; Referee: Robert Schörgenhofer (Austria)

15 November 2015 Euro 2016 Q PO	Hungary	2–1	Norway
20:45 CET	Priskin 14'; Henriksen 83' (o.g.)	Report	Henriksen 87'	Attendance: 22,000; Referee: Carlos Velasco Carballo (Spain)

26 March 2016 Friendly match	Hungary	1–1	Croatia
18:00 CET	Dzsudzsák 79'	Report	Mandžukić 18'	Attendance: 20,300; Referee: Radek Prihoda (Czech Republic)

20 May 2016 Friendly match	Hungary	0–0	Ivory Coast
18:00 CET		Report		Attendance: 19,900; Referee: Vlado Glođović (Serbia)

7 October 2016 2018 FIFA WC Q	Hungary	2–3	Switzerland
20:45 CET	Szalai 53', 71'	Report (FIFA); Report (UEFA)	Seferovic 51'; Rodríguez 67'; Stocker 89'	Attendance: 21,546; Referee: Björn Kuipers (Netherlands)

13 November 2016 2018 FIFA WC Q	Hungary	4–0	Andorra
18:00 CET	Gera 34'; Lang 43'; Gyurcsó 73'; Szalai 88'	Report (FIFA); Report (UEFA)		Attendance: 21,344; Referee: Christos Nicolaides (Cyprus)

15 November 2016 Friendly match	Hungary	0–2	Sweden
19:45 CET		Report	30' Larsson; 67' Thelin	Attendance: 16,842; Referee: Paolo Valeri (Italy)

5 June 2017 Friendly match	Hungary	0–3	Russia
20:30 CET		Report	20' Smolov; 40' Eppel (o.g.); 89' Poloz	Attendance: 12,442; Referee: Christian Dingert (Germany)

31 August 2017 2018 FIFA WC Q	Hungary	3–1	Latvia
20:45 CET	6' Kádár; 26' Szalai; 68' Dzsudzsák	Report	40' Freimanis	Attendance: 20,036; Referee: Yevhen Aranovsky (Ukraine)

3 September 2017 2018 FIFA WC Q	Hungary	0–1	Portugal
20:45 CET		Report	48' A. Silva	Attendance: 21,344; Referee: Danny Makkelie (Netherlands)

10 October 2017 2018 FIFA WC Q	Hungary	1–0	Faroe Islands
20:45 CET	Böde 81'	Report		Attendance: 18,775; Referee: Roi Reinshreiber (Israel)

14 November 2017 Friendly match	Hungary	1–0	Costa Rica
20:15 CET	Nikolić 37'	Report		Attendance: 9,860; Referee: Alexander Harkam (Austria)

23 March 2018 Friendly match	Hungary	2–3	Kazakhstan
19:00 CET	Szalai 21'; Németh 68'	Report	6' Murtazayev; 21' Zaynutdinov; 39' Seidakhmet	Attendance: 9,038; Referee: Tomasz Musial (Poland)

27 March 2018 Friendly match	Hungary	0–1	Scotland
20:00 CET		Report	Phillips 48'	Attendance: 9,000; Referee: Harald Lechner (Austria)

9 June 2018 Friendly match	Hungary	1–2	Australia
17:30 CEST	Sainsbury 88' (o.g.)	Report	Arzani 74'; Kádár 90+2' (o.g.)	Attendance: 10,091; Referee: Matej Jug (Slovenia)

11 September 2018 2018–19 UEFA NL	Hungary	2–1	Greece
20:45 CET	Sallai 15'; Kleinheisler 43'	Report	Manolas 18'	Attendance: 120; Referee: Aleksei Kulbakov (Belarus)

15 November 2018 2018–19 UEFA NL	Hungary	2–0	Estonia
20:45 CET	Orban 8'; Szalai 69'	Report		Attendance: 7,775; Referee: Enea Jorgji (Albania)

18 November 2018 2018–19 UEFA NL	Hungary	2–0	Finland
20:45 CET	Szalai 29'; Á. Nagy 37'	Report		Attendance: 9,200; Referee: Slavko Vinčić (Slovenia)

24 March 2019 Euro 2020 Q	Hungary	2–1	Croatia
18:00 CET	Szalai 34'; Pátkai 76'	Report	Rebić 13'	Attendance: 19,400; Referee: Willie Collum (Scotland)

11 June 2019 Euro 2020 Q	Hungary	1–0	Wales
20:45 CET	Pátkai 80'	Report		Attendance: 18,350; Referee: Matej Jug (Slovenia)

9 September 2019 Euro 2020 Q	Hungary	1–2	Slovakia
20:45 CET	Szoboszlai 50'	Report	Mak 40'; Boženík 56'	Attendance: 22,000; Referee: Antonio Mateu Lahoz (Spain)

13 October 2019 Euro 2020 Q	Hungary	1–0	Azerbaijan
18:00 CET	Korhut 10'	Report		Attendance: 11,300; Referee: Dennis Higler (Netherlands)

Note:

- Q = qualification
- PO = play-off
- WC = World Cup
- NL = Nations League

=== Statistics ===
As of 9 December 2020

Match	P	W	D	L	GD
Qualifier	18	12	2	4	27–13
Friendly	9	1	2	6	6–14
Total	27	13	4	10	33–27

Top-scorer: (Hungary) Ádám Szalai (8 goals)

== Average attendances ==
As of 17 May 2026

This table includes only domestic league matches.

Season	Ferencvárosi TC								Ref
Season	Division	GP	Average	Change	Highest Gate		Lowest Gate		Ref
2014–15	NB I	15	8,384	–	21,217	vs Újpest	3,465	vs Pápa	
2015–16	NB I	17	7,737	−7.7%	17,489	vs Újpest	4,858	vs Puskás Akadémia	
2016–17	NB I	17	6,721	−13.1%	11,760	vs Újpest	4,754	vs MTK Budapest	
2017–18	NB I	17	9,066	+34.8%	19,125	vs Debrecen	4,911	vs Szombathelyi Haladás	
2018–19	NB I	17	10,715	+18.2%	20,675	vs Újpest	6,771	vs Puskás Akadémia	
2019–20	NB I	15	9,175	−14.3%	18,759	vs Újpest	2,123	vs Kisvárda	
2020–21	NB I	5	7,623	−16.9%	15,789	vs Újpest	2,921	vs Mezőkövesd	
2021–22	NB I	17	8,709	+14.2%	20,155	vs Újpest	5,677	vs Mezőkövesd, ZTE	
2022–23	NB I	16	10,430	+19.7%	18,197	vs Újpest	7,051	vs Puskás Akadémia	
2023–24	NB I	17	11,340	+8.7%	20,357	vs Újpest	6,127	vs Mezőkövesd	
2024–25	NB I	16	11,236	−0.9%	19,021	vs Puskás Akadémia	6,695	vs MTK Budapest	
2025–26	NB I	16	10,104	−10.07%	18,779	vs Újpest	6,477	vs Nyíregyháza	

== Gallery ==
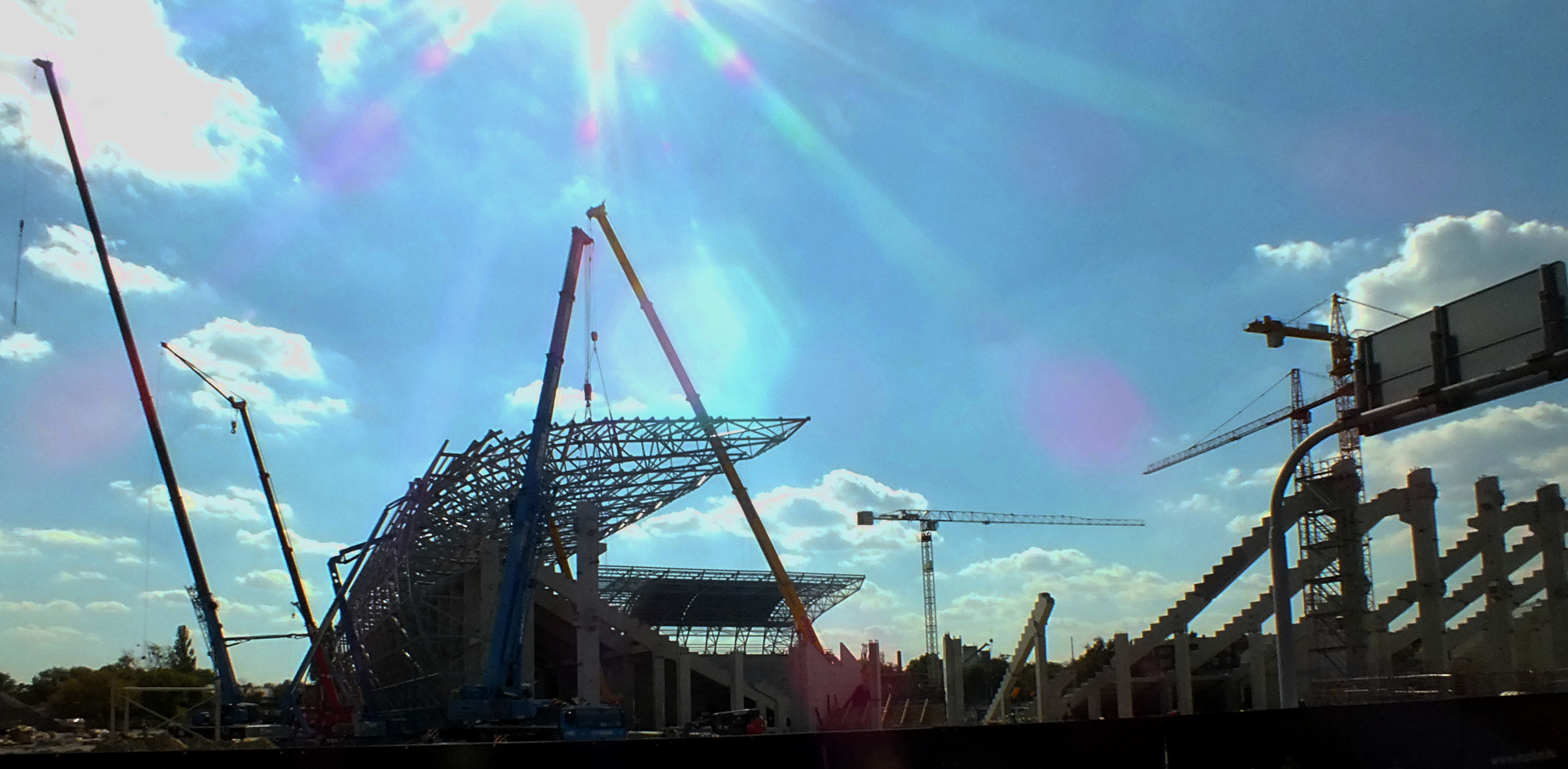
The construction of the stadium

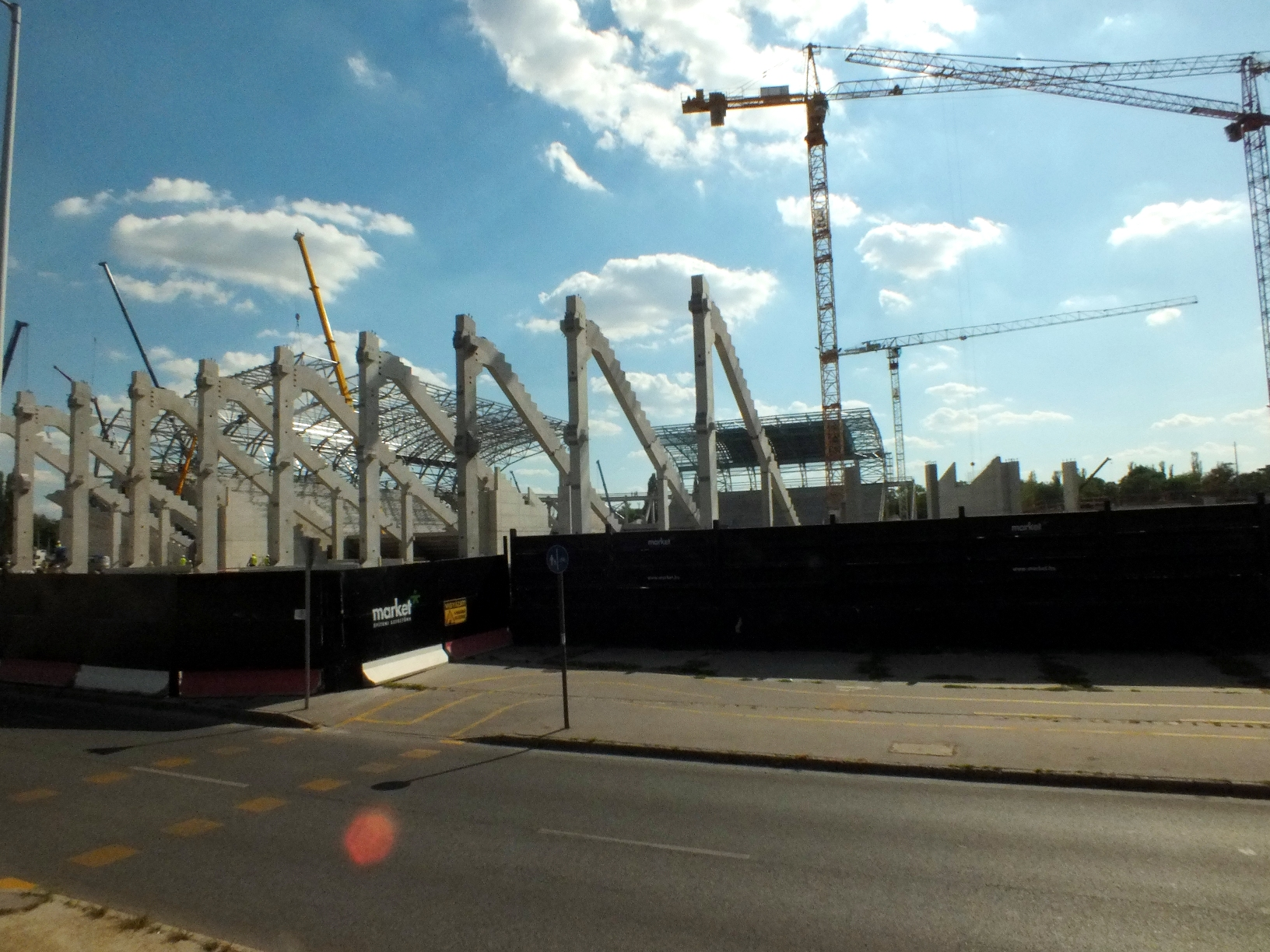
The construction of the stadium in the summer of 2013

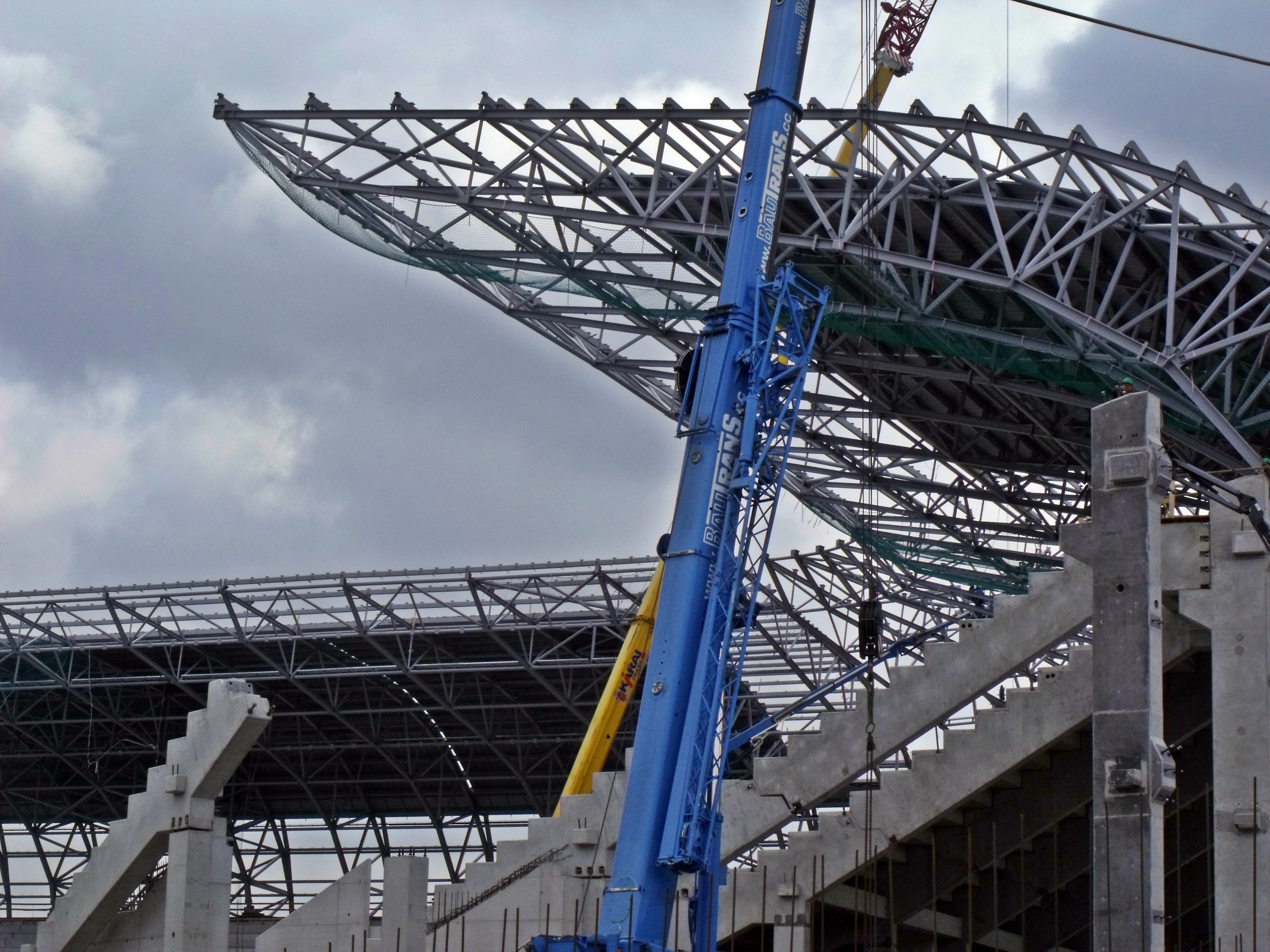

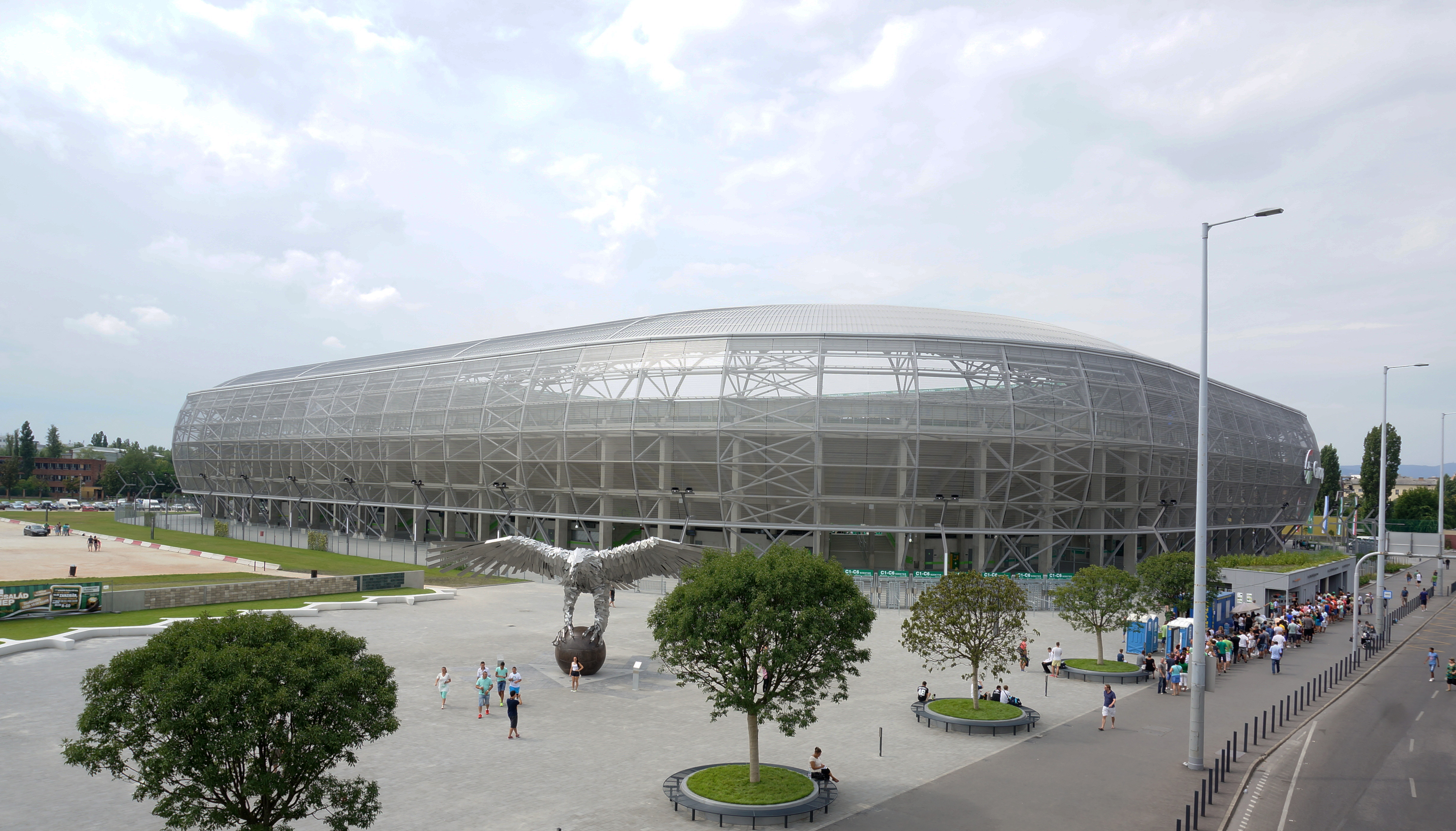
The exterior of the stadium at the corner of Üllői út and Könyves Kálmán körút

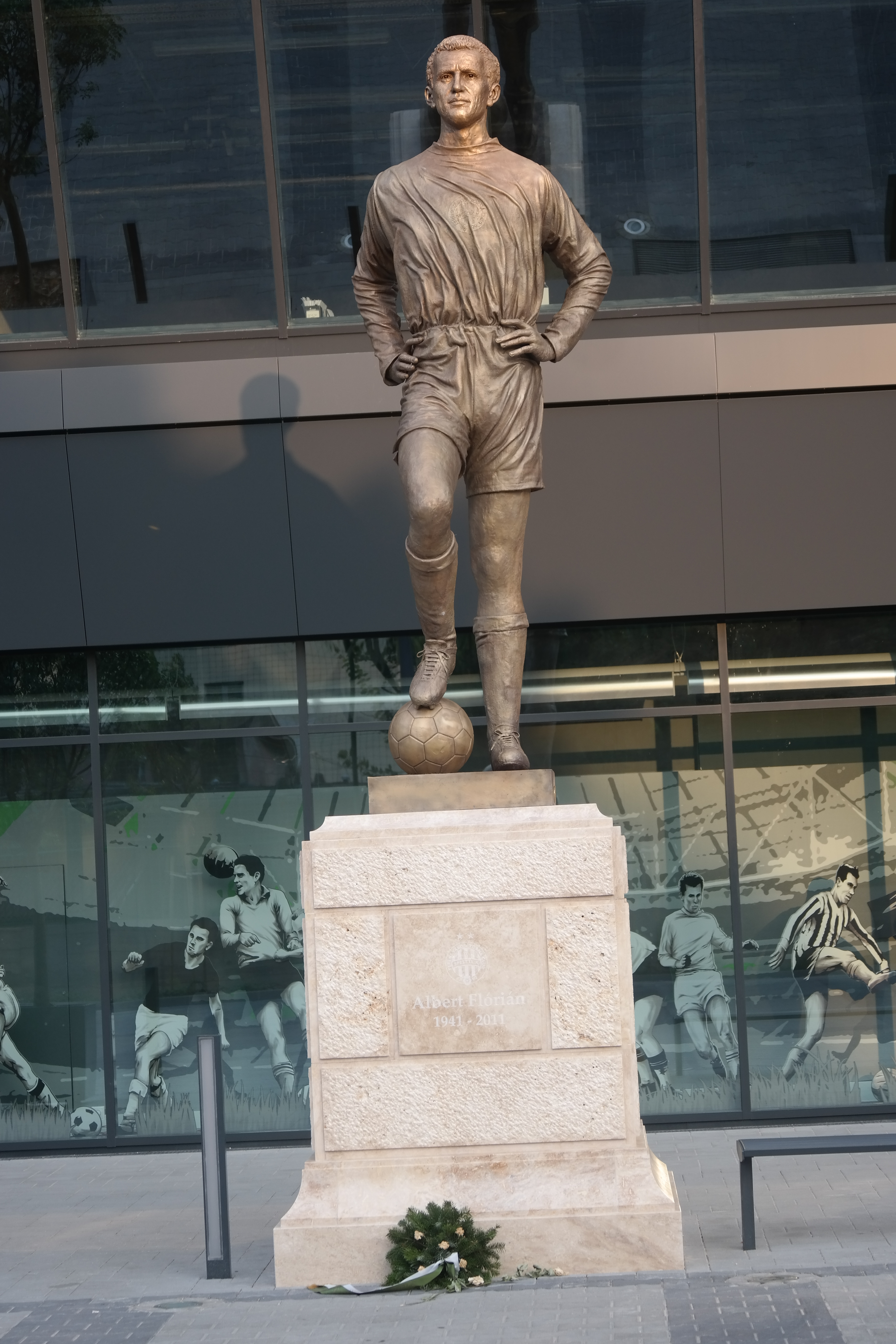
The statue of Flórián Albert

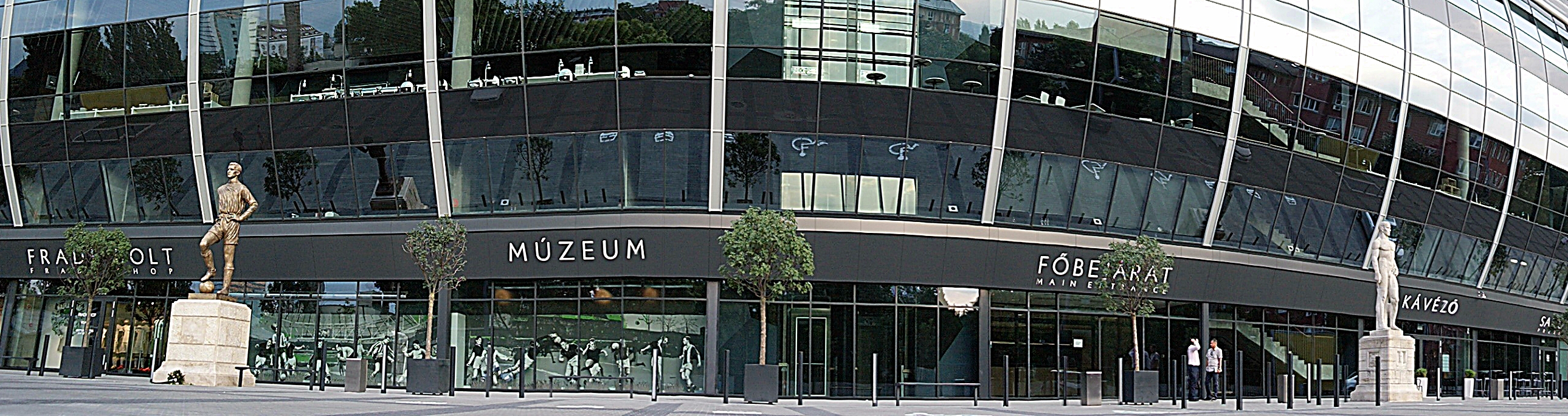
The main entrance

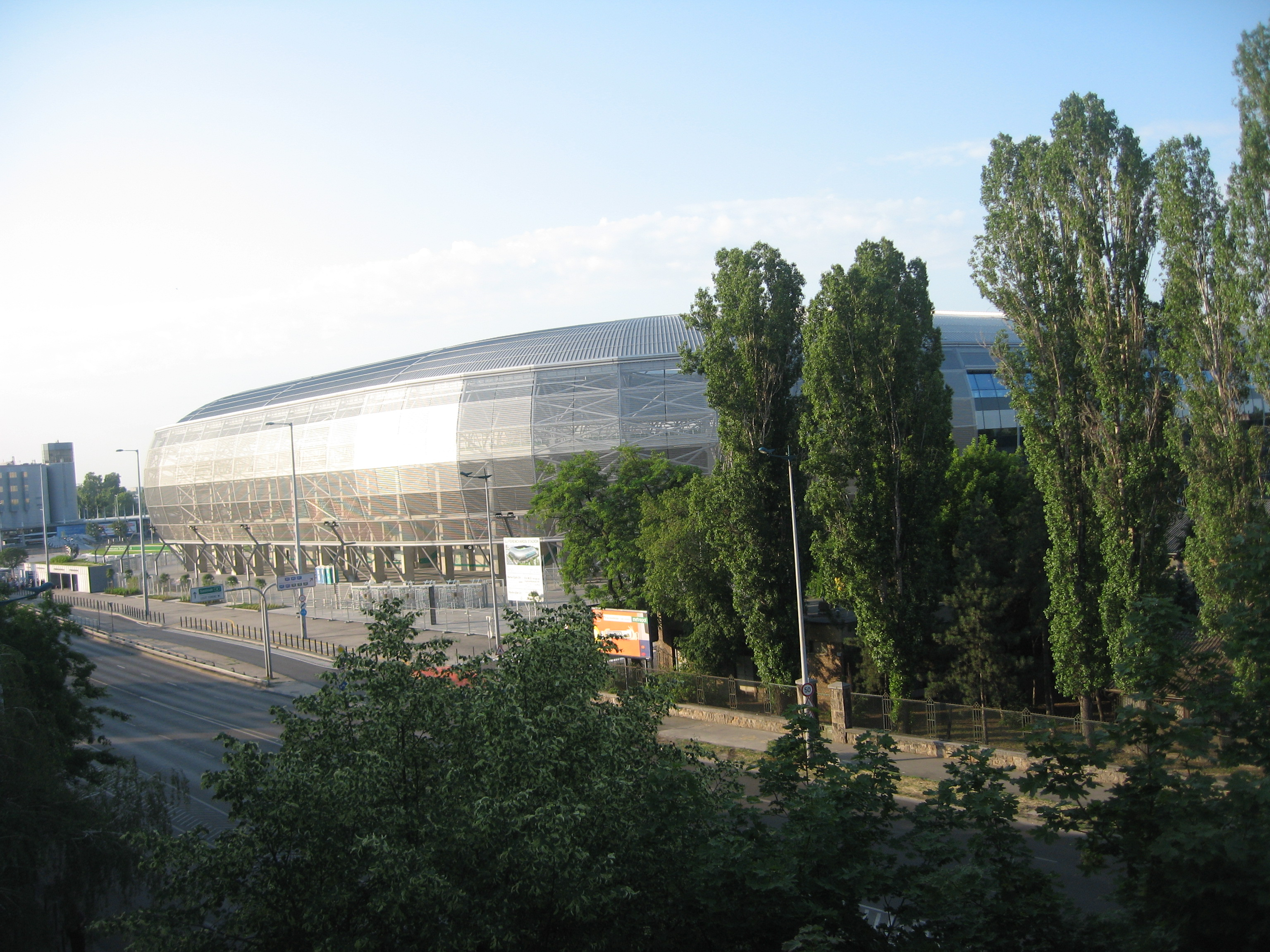
The exterior of the stadium

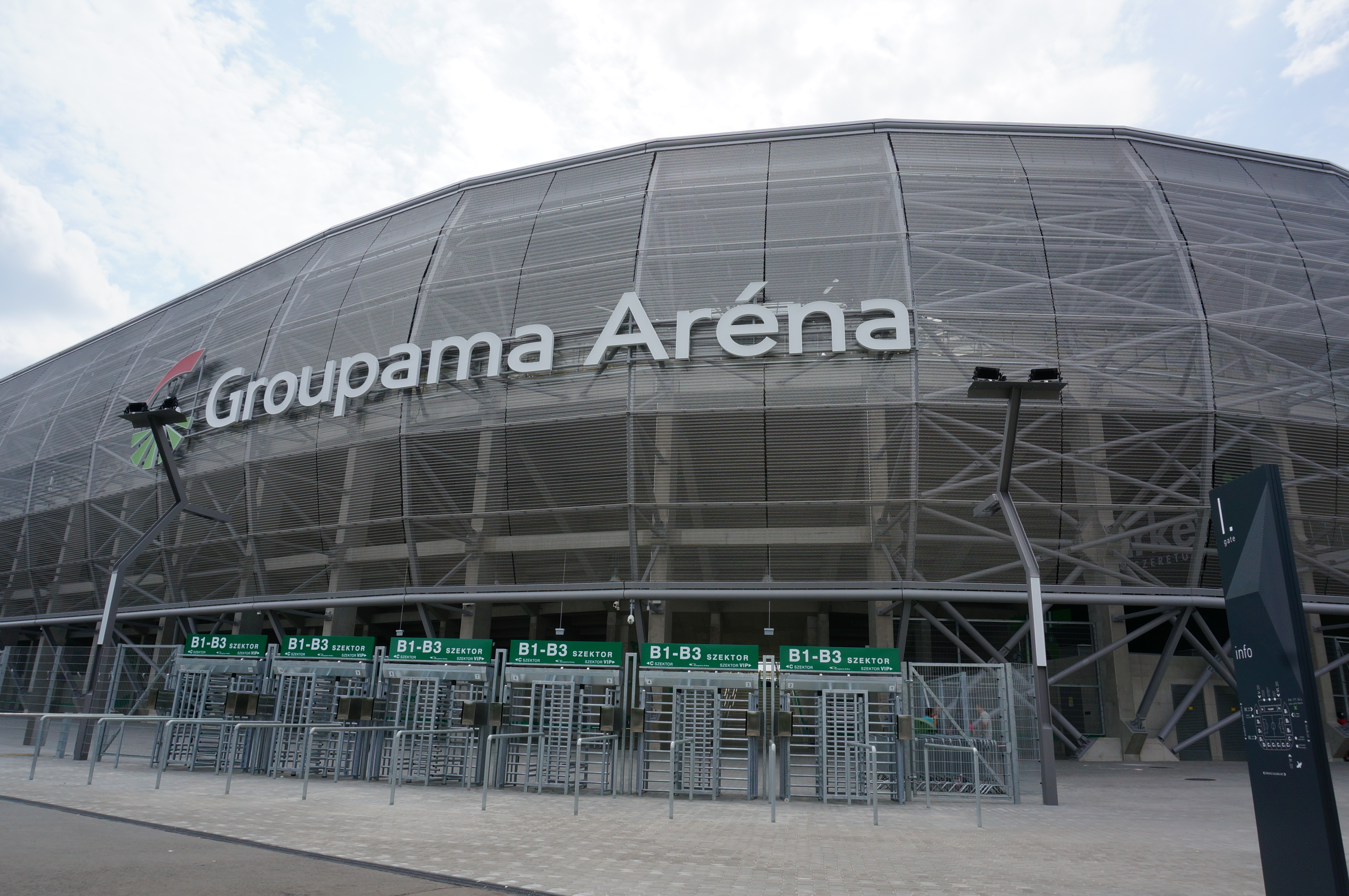
The entrance of the Arena in the Üllői út

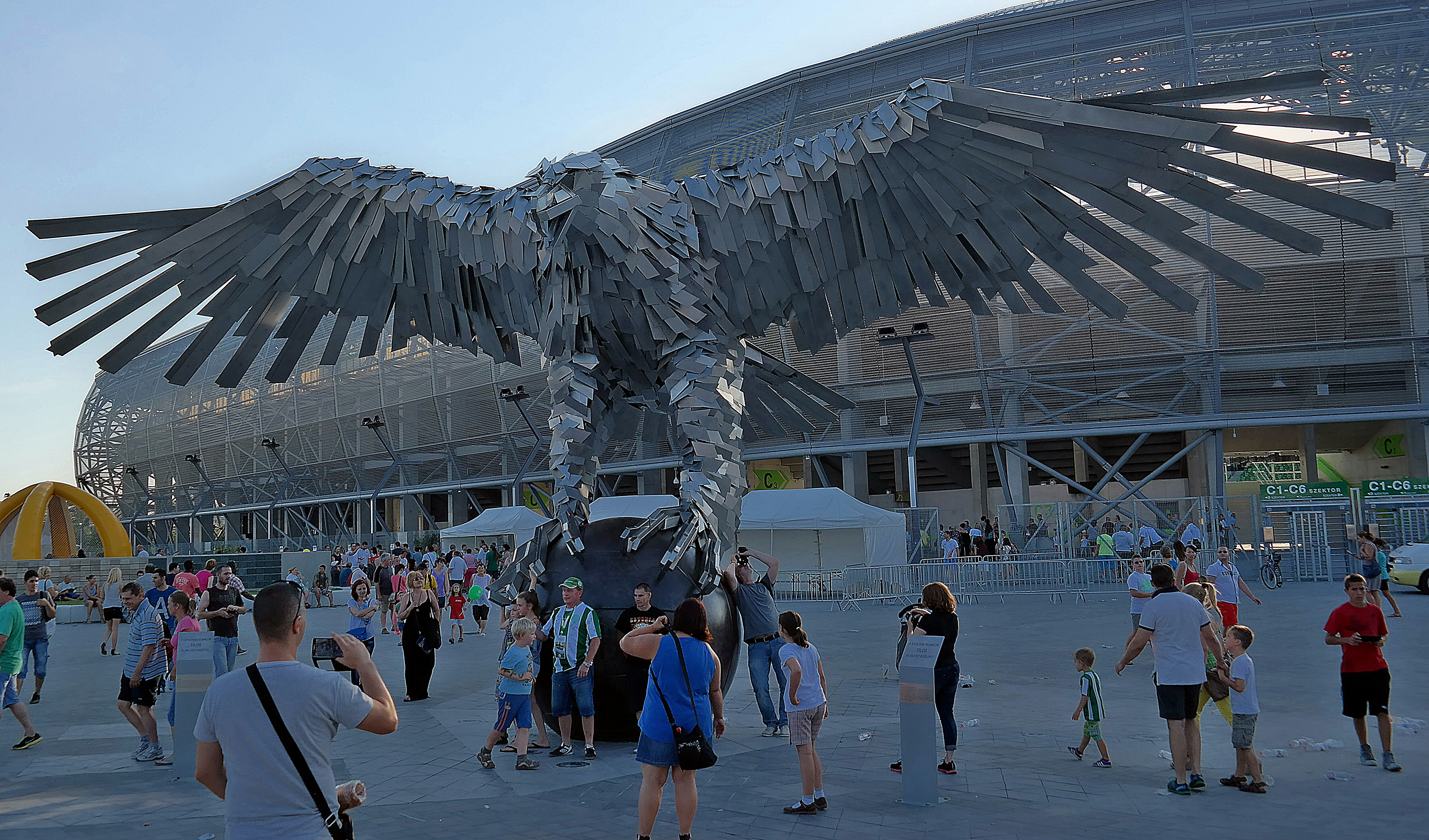
The eagle statue

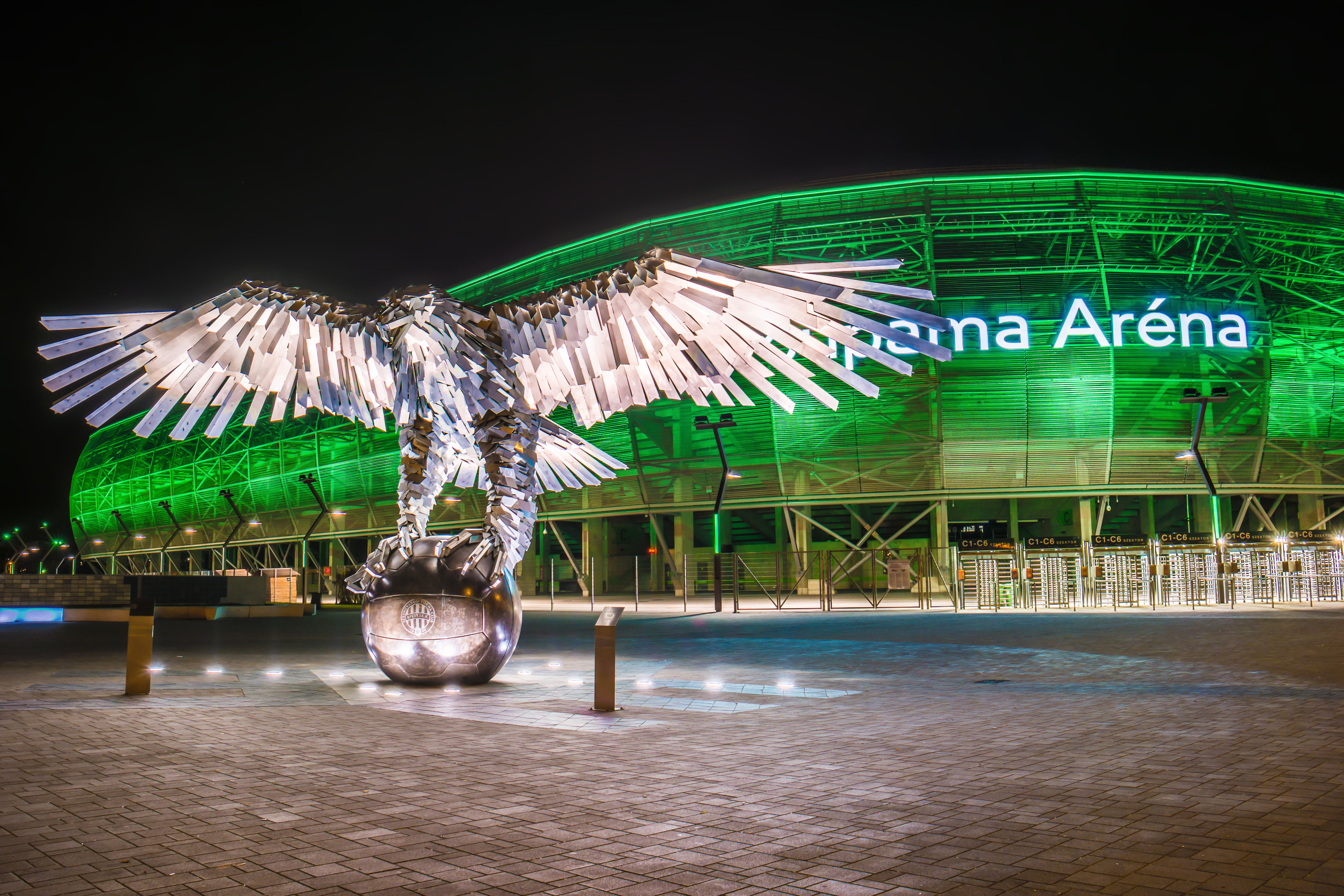
By night

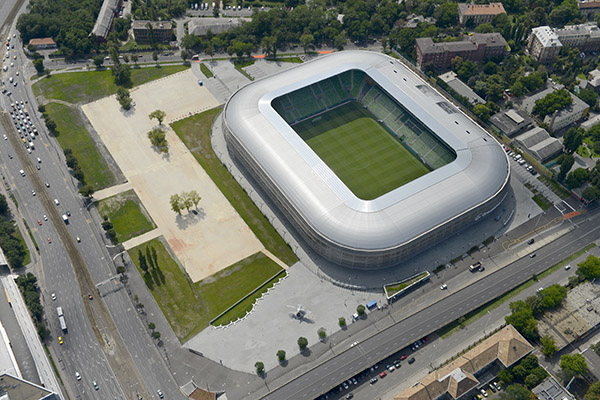
birdview

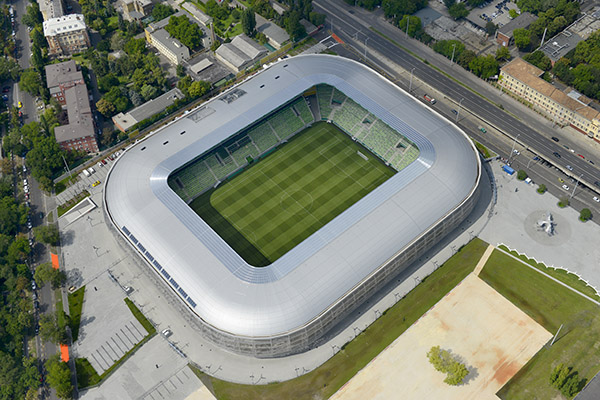
birdview

== See also ==
- List of football stadiums in Hungary
- Lists of stadiums

Preceded by Valeriy Lobanovskyi Dynamo Stadium; Kyiv	UEFA Women's Champions League; Final venue 2019	Succeeded by Anoeta Stadium; San Sebastián
