= Corvin-negyed metro station =

Budapest metro station

Corvin-negyed
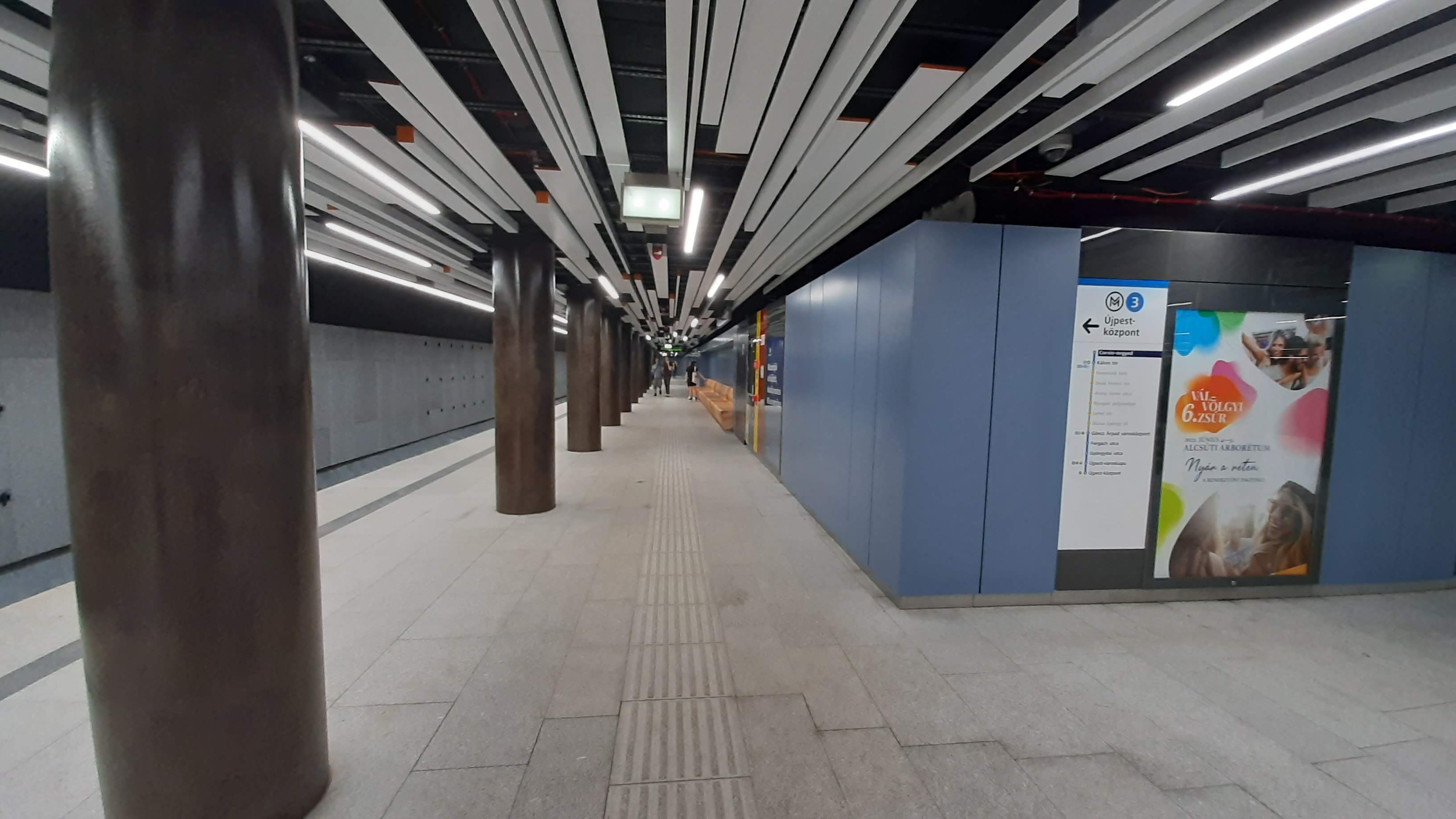

General information
- Location: Budapest; Hungary
- Coordinates: 47°29′08″N 19°04′11″E
- System: Budapest Metro station
- Platforms: 1 island platform

Construction
- Structure type: bored underground
- Depth: 26.97 m (88.5 ft)

History
- Opened: 31 December 1976
- Closed: 11 July 2020 temporarily
- Rebuilt: 2022

Services
Preceding station	Budapest Metro	Following station
Semmelweis Klinikák towards Kőbánya-Kispest	Line 3	Kálvin tér towards Újpest-központ
Location

Corvin-negyed is a station on the M3 line of the Budapest Metro. The station opened on 31 December 1976 as one of six stations in the initial phase of construction, between Deák Ferenc tér and Nagyvárad tér. From its opening until 2011, the station was named Ferenc körút after its section of the Grand Boulevard. In 2011, the Corvinus Quarter (Corvin-negyed) was established as a residential and commercial redevelopment area. The city renamed the station after the new district as part of several name changes to metro stations that year.

== Connections ==
- Tram: 4, 6
- Trolleybus: 83
- Bus: 223E
