= Ecseri út metro station =

Budapest metro station

Ecseri út
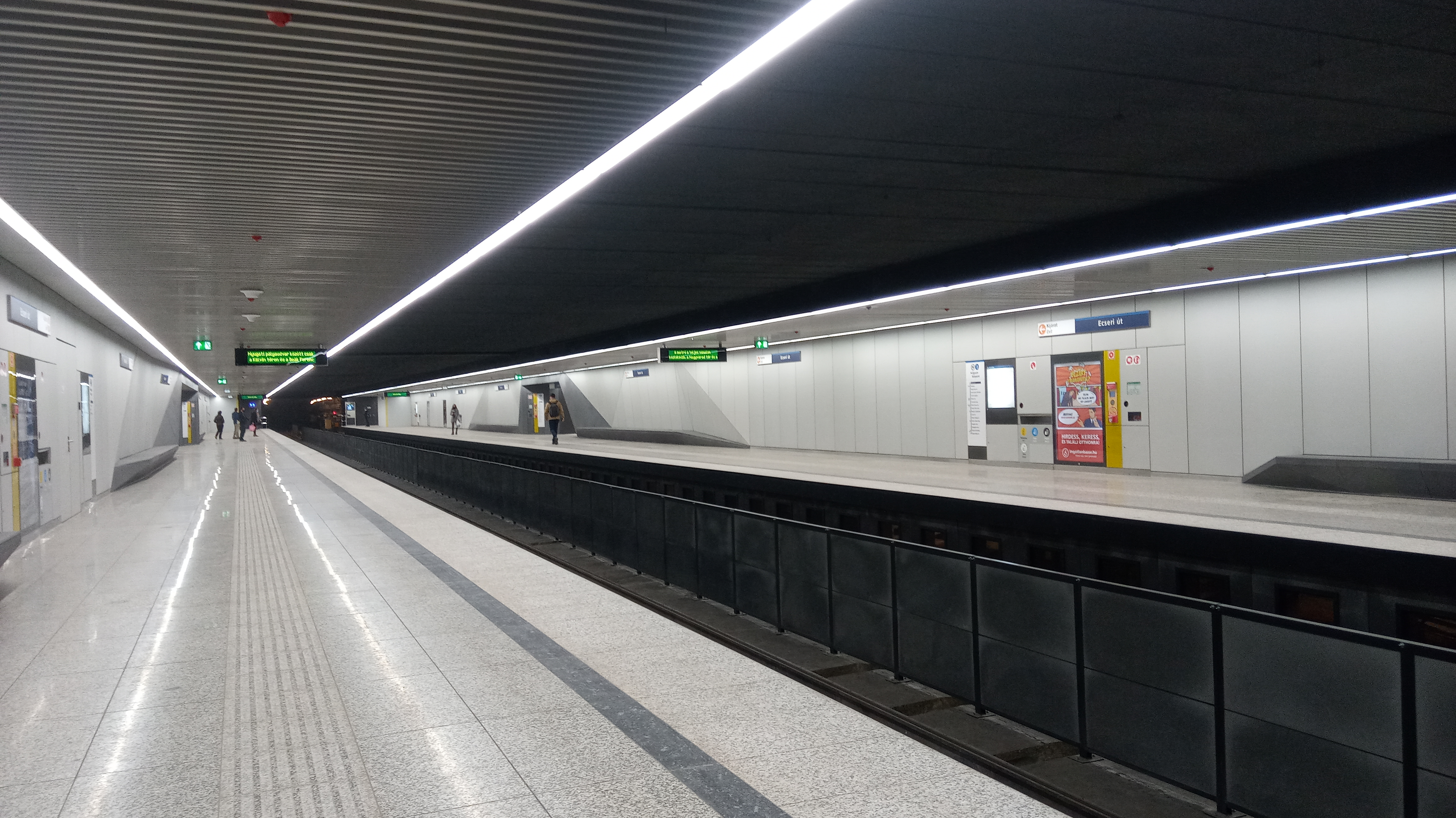

General information
- Location: Budapest; Hungary
- Coordinates: 47°28′17″N 19°06′36″E
- System: Budapest Metro station
- Platforms: 2 side platforms

Construction
- Structure type: cut-and-cover underground
- Depth: 4.4 m (14 ft)

History
- Opened: 29 March 1980
- Rebuilt: 22 October 2020

Services
| Preceding station | Budapest Metro | Following station |
|---|---|---|
| Pöttyös utca towards Kőbánya-Kispest | Line 3 | Népliget towards Újpest-központ |
Location

Ecseri út is a station on the M3 (North-South) line of the Budapest Metro. Next to the station there are the northern blocks of Attila József microraion. The station is named after the adjacent street Ecseri út. The station was opened on 20 April 1980 as part of the extension from Nagyvárad tér to Kőbánya-Kispest.

== Connections ==
- Bus: 181, 254E, 281
- Tram: 3
