= Népliget metro station =

Budapest metro station

Népliget
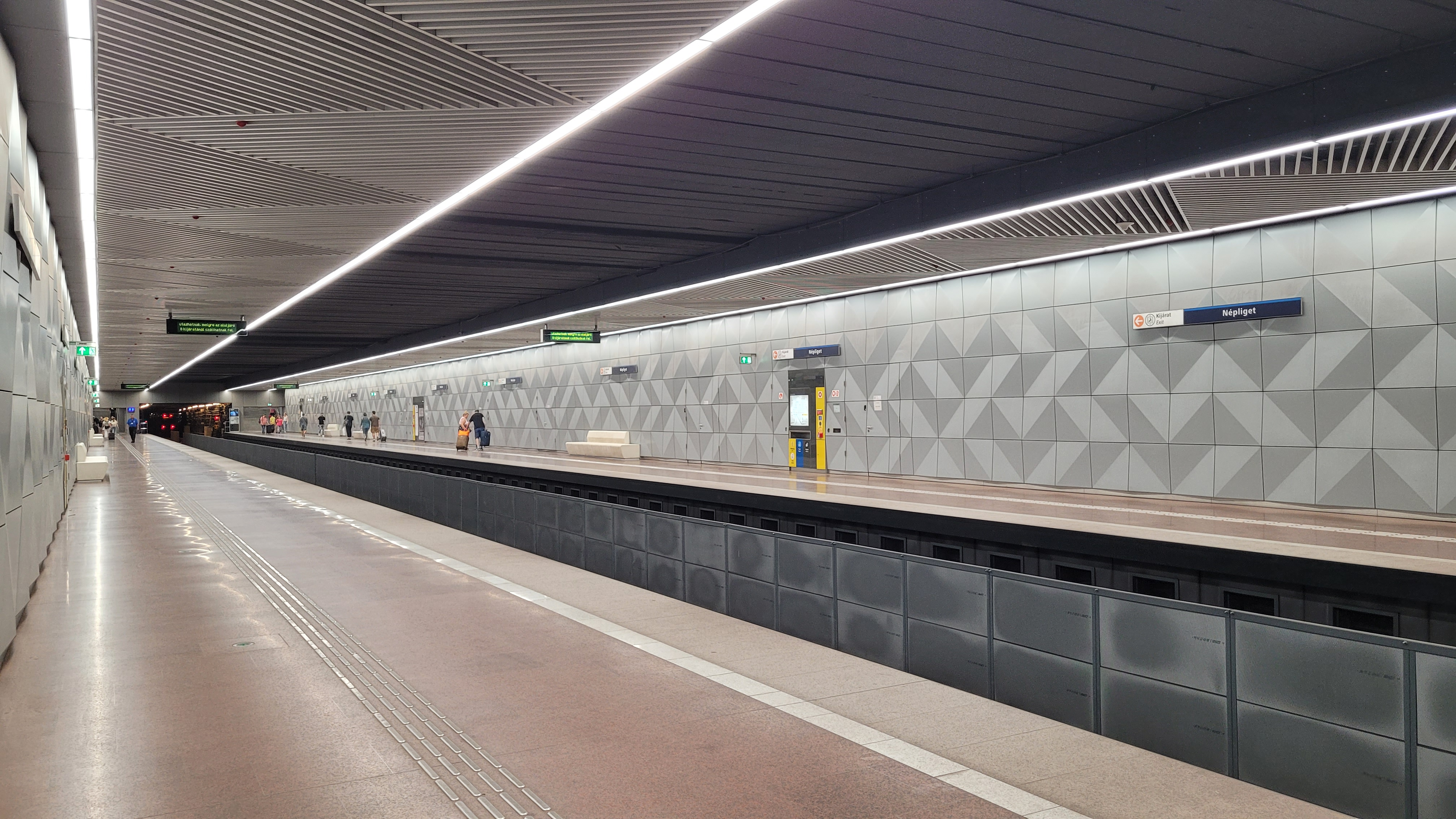

General information
- Location: Budapest; Hungary
- Coordinates: 47°28′32″N 19°05′55″E
- System: Budapest Metro station
- Platforms: 2 side platforms

Construction
- Structure type: cut-and-cover underground
- Depth: 7.61 m (25.0 ft)

History
- Opened: 29 March 1980
- Rebuilt: 22 October 2020

Services
Preceding station	Budapest Metro	Following station
Ecseri út towards Kőbánya-Kispest	Line 3	Nagyvárad tér towards Újpest-központ
Location

Népliget is a station on the M3 (North-South) line of the Budapest Metro. The station lies under the intersection of Üllői Avenue and Könyves Kálmán Boulevard, and named after the city park Népliget. Népliget is also one of the most important suburban, inter-city and international bus terminal in Budapest, which was rebuilt in 2003. The station was opened on 20 April 1980 as part of the extension from Nagyvárad tér to Kőbánya-Kispest.

== Connections ==
- Bus: 254E
- Regional bus: 607, 608, 626, 628, 629, 630, 631, 632, 633, 635, 636, 650, 653, 655, 656, 660, 661, 705
- Trolleybus: 83
- Tram: 1, 1A
