= Semmelweis Klinikák metro station =

Budapest metro station

Semmelweis Klinikák
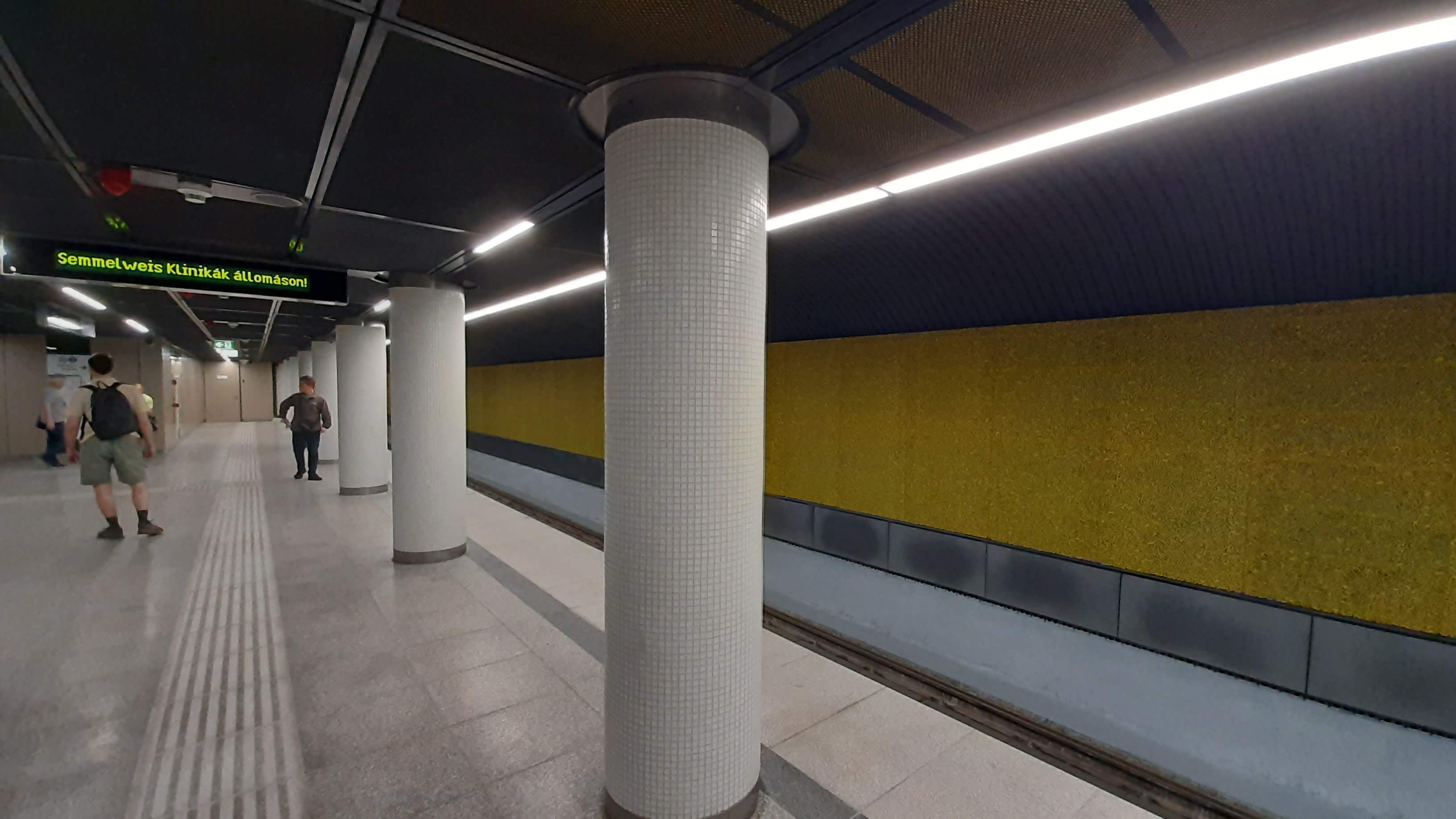

General information
- Location: Budapest; Hungary
- Coordinates: 47°28′57″N 19°04′44″E
- System: Budapest Metro station
- Platforms: 1 island platform

Construction
- Structure type: bored underground
- Depth: 20.07 m (65.8 ft)

History
- Opened: 31 December 1976
- Closed: 11 July 2020 temporarily
- Rebuilt: 2022

Services
| Preceding station | Budapest Metro | Following station |
|---|---|---|
| Nagyvárad tér towards Kőbánya-Kispest | Line 3 | Corvin-negyed towards Újpest-központ |
Location

Semmelweis Klinikák (Clinics) is a station on the M3 line of the Budapest Metro. It opened on 31 December 1976 as one of the initial six stations of the line, between Deák Ferenc tér and Nagyvárad tér.

From its opening until 6 September 2019, the station was known as Klinikák, meaning clinics. The area around the station is home to several of the medical facilities of Semmelweis University, the city's medical school and one of the largest health care providers. As part of the university's 250th anniversary, the Mayor of Budapest, István Tarlós declared that the station name would change to Semmelweis Klinikák upon completion of the station's renovations.
