= Üllői út =

Coordinates: 47°26′47″N 19°10′14″E

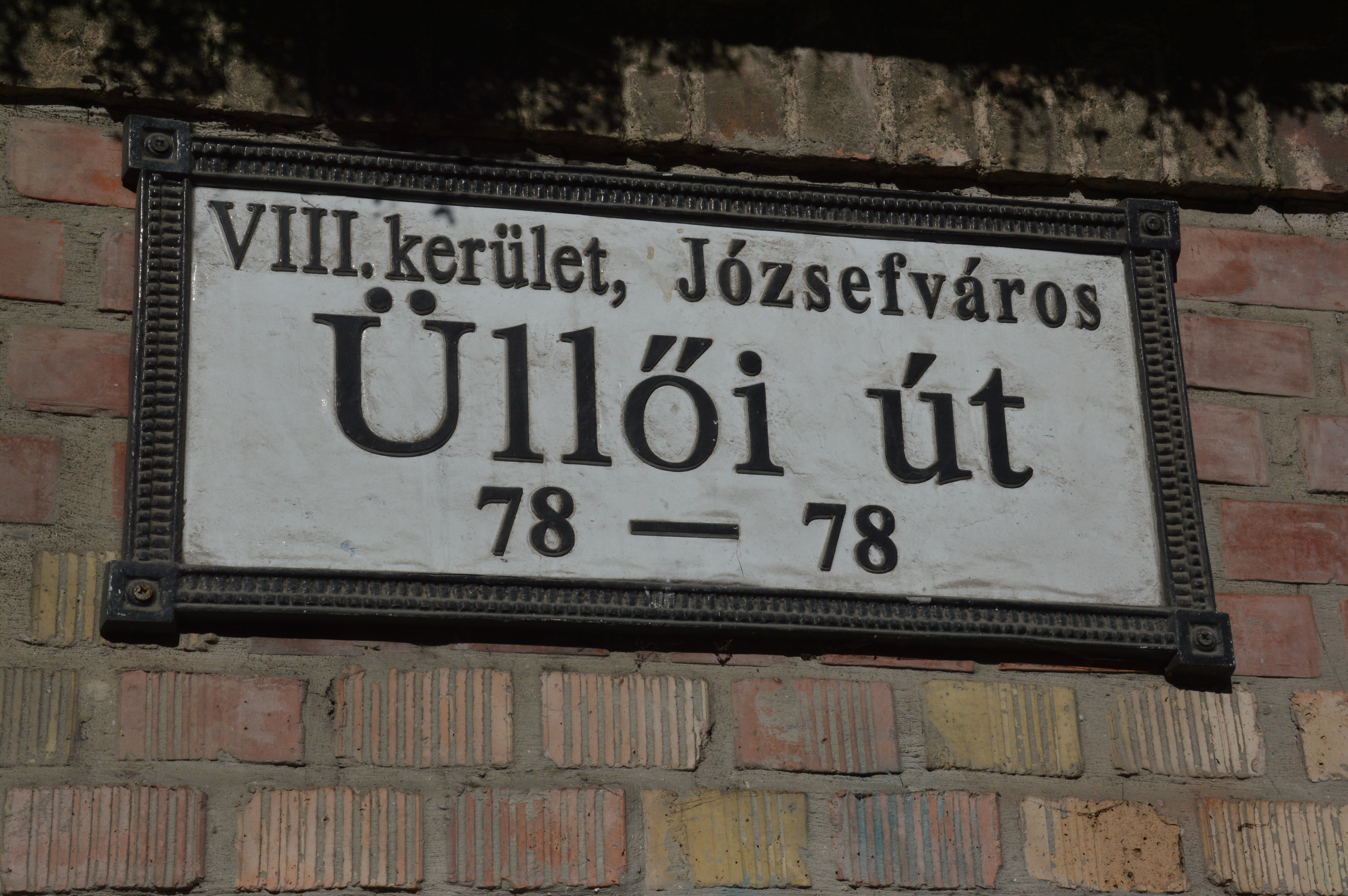
Üllői út street sign

Üllői út (Üllői Avenue, lit. means "Road to Üllő", Hungarian pronunciation: [ˈylːøːji ˈuːt]) is a major transport artery in Budapest, Hungary. Üllői út is the longest avenue in Budapest. It is 15.6 km long and nearly perfectly straight.

It starts at the edge of Inner City proper, crosses Small Boulevard and Grand Boulevard and runs as far as the boundary of the capital in southeastern direction, reaching the nearby towns (suburbs) of Vecsés and Üllő, the latter providing its name. During the socialist era, the avenue's name was Vörös Hadsereg útja (lit. Street of the Red Army) between Határ út (pre-1950 city limit) and the present (post-1950) city limit. See also: Greater Budapest

The Metro 3 runs under it from Kálvin tér as far as Határ út, having 8 stations along it. It has a side-road leading to Ferihegy Airport, the most important international airport of Hungary. It also forms the boundary between Ferencváros and Józsefváros.

Üllő means "anvil" in Hungarian.

Among its notable points are

- Semmelweis University
- Museum of Applied Arts
- Semmelweis University Clinics
- Szent István Hospital and Szent László Hospital (together Üllői Avenue Clinics, the largest hospital complex in Budapest)
- Stadion Albert Flórián (former Üllői úti stadion/Stadion Üllői Avenue)
- People's Park with the central autobus station
- Attila József microdistrict (built 1957–1967), the first Soviet-style housing estate in Budapest
- Wekerletelep, a historic garden suburb built before and around WWI, named after Sándor Wekerle, its central square planned by the architect Károly Kós.

== Sources ==
- Budapest City Atlas, Dimap, Budapest, 2006, ISBN 963-9549-15-0 CM
