= Wekerletelep =

Estate in Kispest, Budapest, Hungary

Coordinates: 47°27′20″N 19°07′34″E

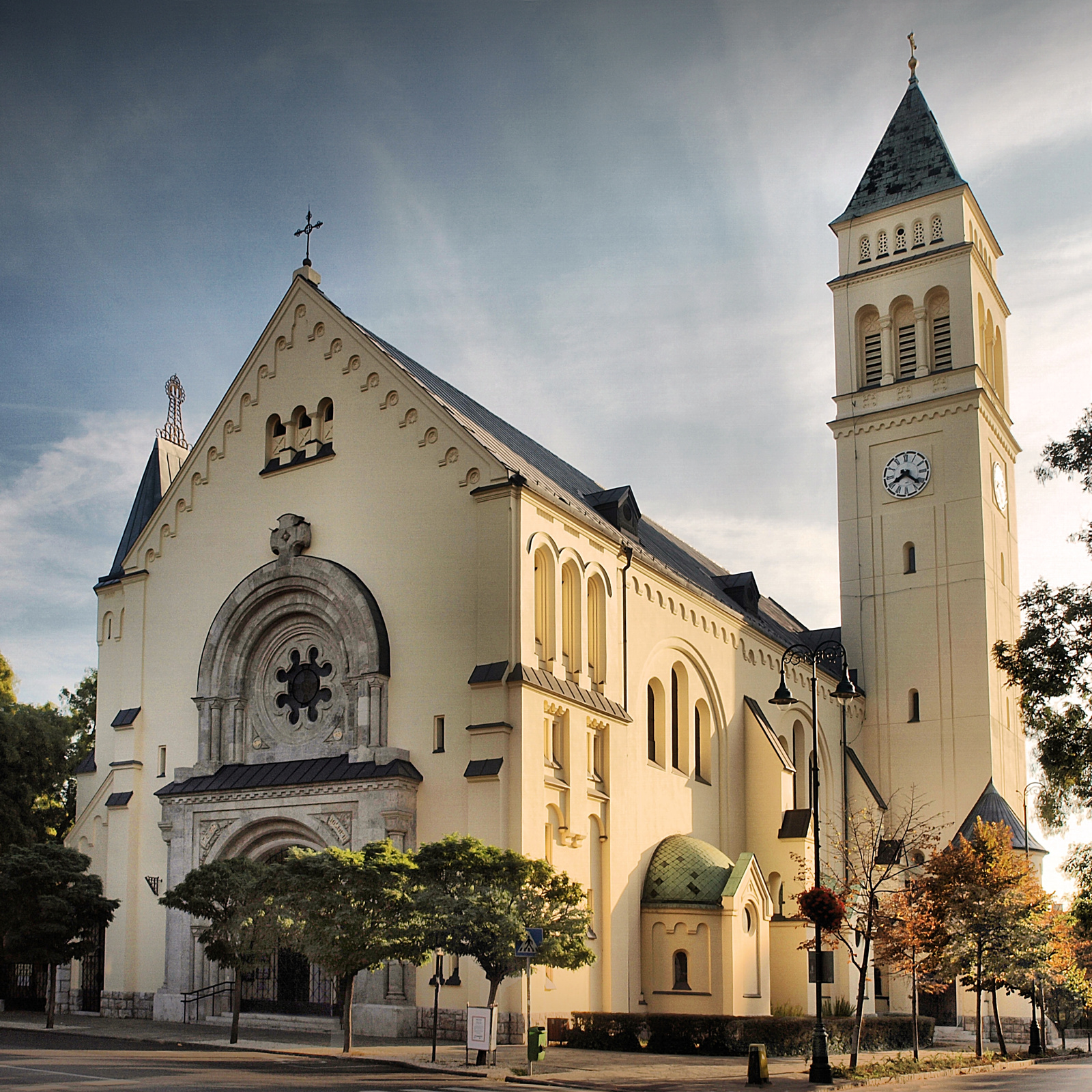
Saint Joseph Church

The Wekerle estate (Hungarian: Wekerletelep) is a part of Budapest's XIX. district (known as Kispest). Kispest, formerly a suburb was administratively attached to Budapest in 1950 along with several other settlements of Greater Budapest.

Wekerle estate was named after Sándor Wekerle, then Hungarian prime minister, who supported the idea of building comfortable, human-scale housing estates for government employees, and was instrumental in launching the project of creating a garden city habitat.

== Location ==
The Wekerle estate lies on a flat area on the W-NW part of Kispest. The highest point is a small artificial knoll on Kós Károly Square. The estate is bounded by the following streets: Nagykőrösi St., Határ St., Ady Endre St., Bercsényi St.

== History ==
=== Background ===
During the last quarter of the 19th century, Greater Budapest's population grew almost threefold to nearly a million. Commercial property development (although exceptionally fast) could not keep up with the demand for lodging, thus, resulting in government intervention to fund housing projects for government employees.

=== The Garden city movement in Central Europe ===
Commercial developers built densely packed large, multi-story apartment houses on narrow streets for new inhabitants of Budapest. Most of these people were coming from villages and small towns, and did not feel comfortable in a big, crowded city without greenery and fresh air. József Fleischl, a popular architect at the time, proposed building planned housing estates, similar to the ideas of the Ebenezer Howard's Garden city movement.

The government of Sándor Wekerle, then prime minister of Hungary supported these plans and invited tenders to implement such a housing estate. Many successful architects of the time submitted "conception plans" for one or two-story houses, ranging from duplexes to 12-flat apartment houses. All designs followed the "Transylvanian style" established by Károly Kós with high roofs and generous use of wooden structures (e.g. staircases). All the houses provided spacious gardens and the street layout was envisioned with comfortable, tree-lined avenues.

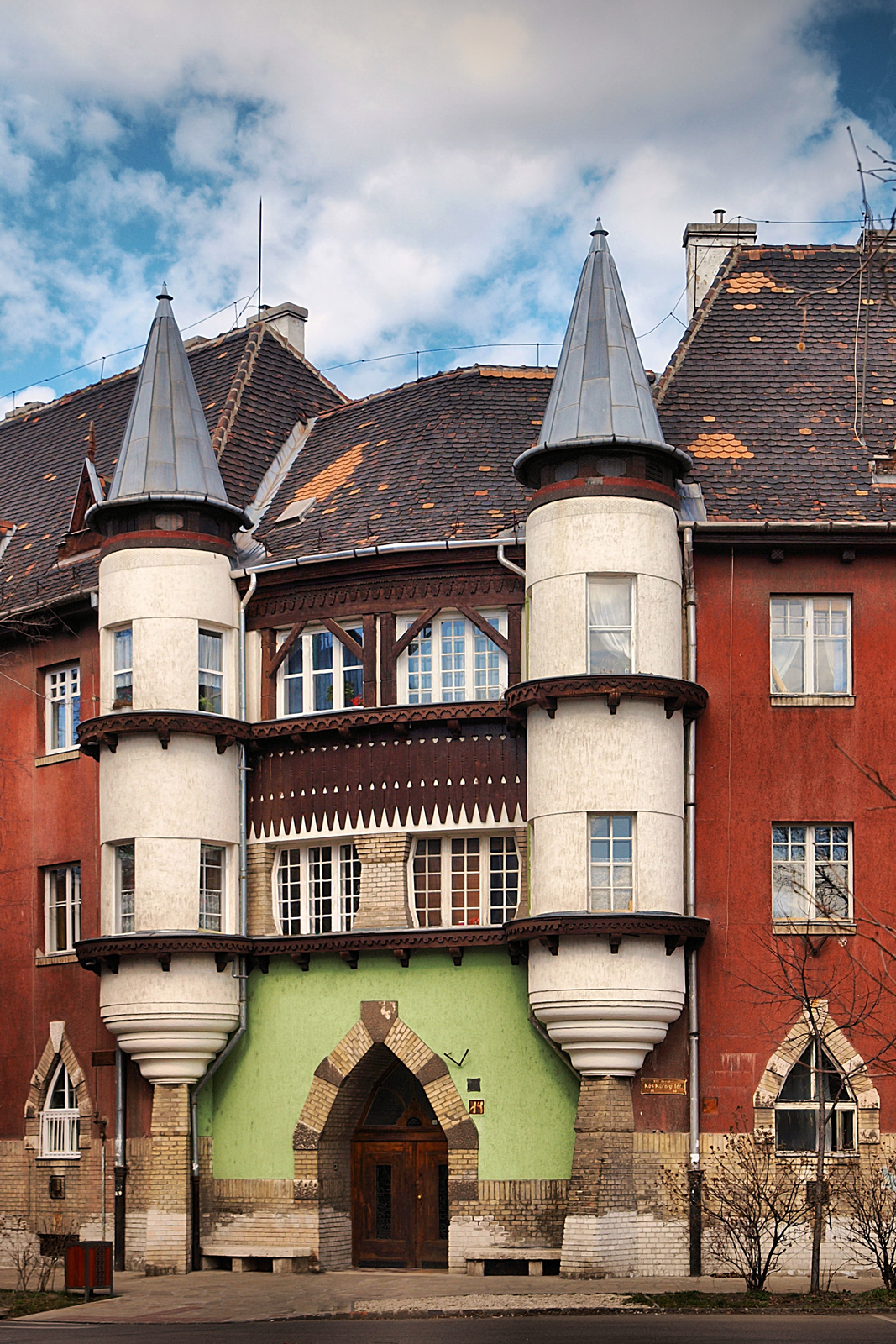
Wekerle estate Kós K. square

=== Construction ===
Construction began in 1908, and until 1925 when the Great Depression forced to abandon further development, 1007 houses were built containing 4412 apartments. One-story buildings placed along smaller streets had 2,3 or 4 individual apartments, and two-storey 6,8, and 12-apartment houses lined wider streets, forming a unique "spider web" street layout, centered on a round square with a large park in the middle.

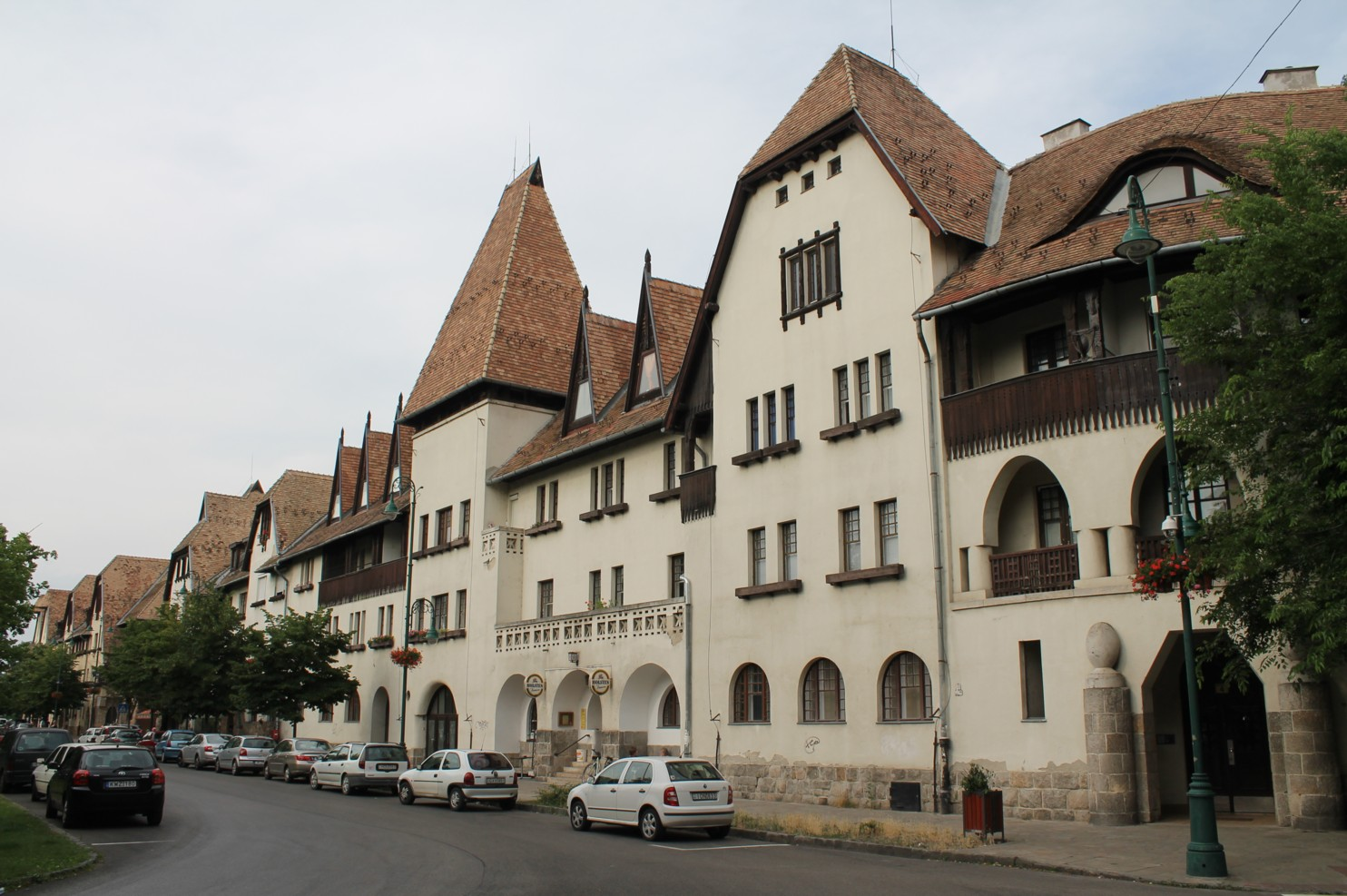
Kós Károly Square, Wekerle estate

Between 1911 and 1914 four schools and two kindergartens were completed with 48 classrooms, 18 kindergarten rooms and 2 gymnasiums. The police headquarters and barracks for mounted police were finished in 1912.

Priority was given to government employees among rent applicants, but the estate, being very popular from the beginning already had 25% of its population from the privately employed, mostly workers of nearby factories.

According to the government's concept (most of the renters would be young, often unmarried clerks and low-level government officials), the majority of the houses include small apartments. The most common arrangement is the 45 m^{2} two-room apartment in 12-apartment complexes. 3-room 59 m^{2} apartments are also common. Larger units are rare, there are a few larger apartments in the 2-storey buildings on the central square. There's a handful of distinct, almost villa-like housings with larger apartments, referred popularly as "headmaster's house" or "doctor's apartment", the name probably stemming from their originally intended function.

The main, central square was very important for the concept of "building for the community", thus planning of the main square was a separate project, won by Károly Kós one of the star architects of the period. He designed the arrangement with the radial street layout and also one of the trademark wooden gates (the eastern one). Many of the famed architects of the era (e.g. Lajos Schodits, Béla Eberling, Dezső Zrumeczky, Gyula Wälder and Dénes Györgyi) designed houses on the square.

=== Garden city layout ===
Fifty thousand trees were planted during the construction, mainly along the spacious avenues. The estate had its own gardening service, who not only took care of the many plants, flowers and trees of the community spaces, but also helped renters to groom their own gardens as well. Four fruit trees were planted for each apartment (altogether 16.000), and thanks to the favorable sandy soil and to the care of the new dwellers, various kinds of drupes bloomed. It was noted that in 1917 redcurrant harvest was so rich that renters could earn almost four times the yearly rent just by selling their fruits.

== The estate today ==
Thanks to the garden city atmosphere, the estate remains very popular up to today. Contemporary inhabitants value the multitude of century-old trees, the greenery and spacious (by big city standards) gardens. In its early days, Wekerle spawned co-operatives and community associations, but under the Communist regime, the community association was closed and the estate began to decay. Now the community association is active again and there has been a renaissance of community action, environmental ventures and volunteering by residents.

The layout of streets makes the building quiet as the radial main streets route vehicular traffic efficiently onto the heavily used, multiple-lane streets surrounding the area.

The exterior of one of the buildings on the central Kós Károly Square is used as the central location of the popular Hungarian daily soap opera "Barátok közt".

== Sport ==
The association football club, Wekerletelepi SC, played their match in Wekerletelep.
