= Határ út metro station =

Budapest metro station

Határ út
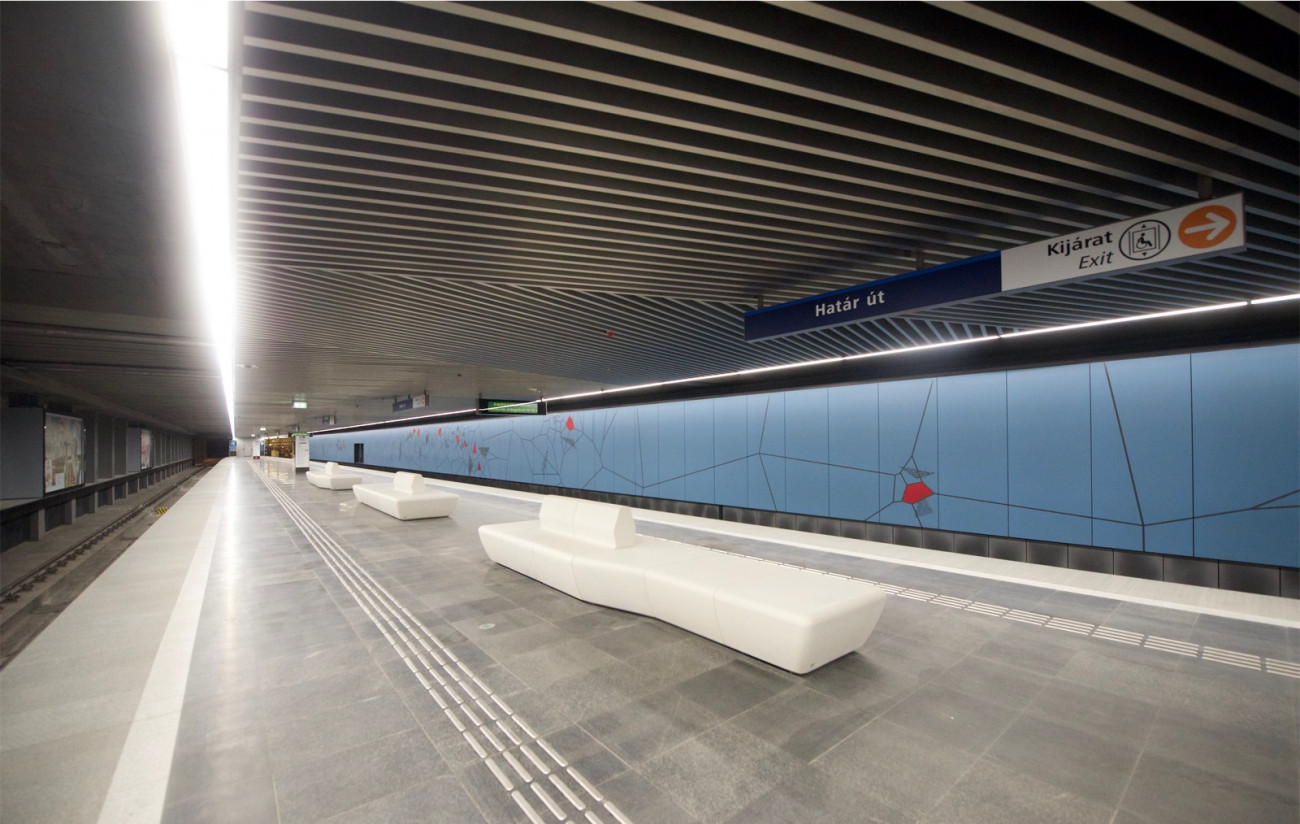

General information
- Location: Budapest; Hungary
- Coordinates: 47°27′53″N 19°07′35″E
- System: Budapest Metro station
- Platforms: 2 side platforms

Construction
- Structure type: cut-and-cover underground
- Depth: 4.86 m (15.9 ft)

History
- Opened: 29 March 1980
- Rebuilt: 22 October 2020

Services
Preceding station	Budapest Metro	Following station
Kőbánya-Kispest Terminus	Line 3	Pöttyös utca towards Újpest-központ
Location

Határ út is a station on the M3 (North-South) line of the Budapest Metro. Near the station, there are several tram and bus terminus, and a shopping centre. Határ út station named after the adjacent street Határ út, which literally means "(City) Border Street". Before the formation of Greater Budapest it was the border of Budapest Capital. The station was opened on 20 April 1980 as part of the extension from Nagyvárad tér to Kőbánya-Kispest.

== Connections ==
- Bus: 66, 66B, 66E, 84E, 89E, 94E, 99, 123, 123A, 142E, 194, 194B, 294E
- Regional bus: 626, 628, 629, 660
- Tram: 42, 50, 52
