= Greater Budapest =

Greater Budapest is the name of Budapest in its present, extended size, as it was created by the Law No. XXVI of 1949. It was passed on December 15, 1949 and came into force on January 1, 1950. By attaching 7 towns and 16 villages to the former Budapest, its area enlarged from 207 km^{2} to 525 km^{2} (increase of 154%), the number of its inhabitants increased from 1.05 million to 1.6 million (increase of 52%), and the number of the districts augmented from 14 to 22 (increase of 57%), thus becoming the seventh metropolis of Europe in its time.

The only difference between the 1950s Greater Budapest and today's Budapest is that Soroksár, a part of District 20, voted for its independence in 1992 and became a separate District 23 in 1994.

In 1950, Inner Budapest (former Little Budapest) had 1.05 million inhabitants and the annexed suburbs 0.55 million. Now, the population of Inner Budapest has decreased to 0.95 million while the population of the former suburbs has increased to 0.75 million. In the 1960s, neighbouring villages became the new suburbs (second suburban belt) and rapidly increased in population. From 1950 to 2009, their population increased from 300,000 to nearly 800,000. Due to suburbanization and motorization, traffic jams have been generated on urban multi-lane highways; 1 million cars run in Budapest on a weekday.
