= Nagyvárad tér metro station =

Budapest metro station

Nagyvárad tér
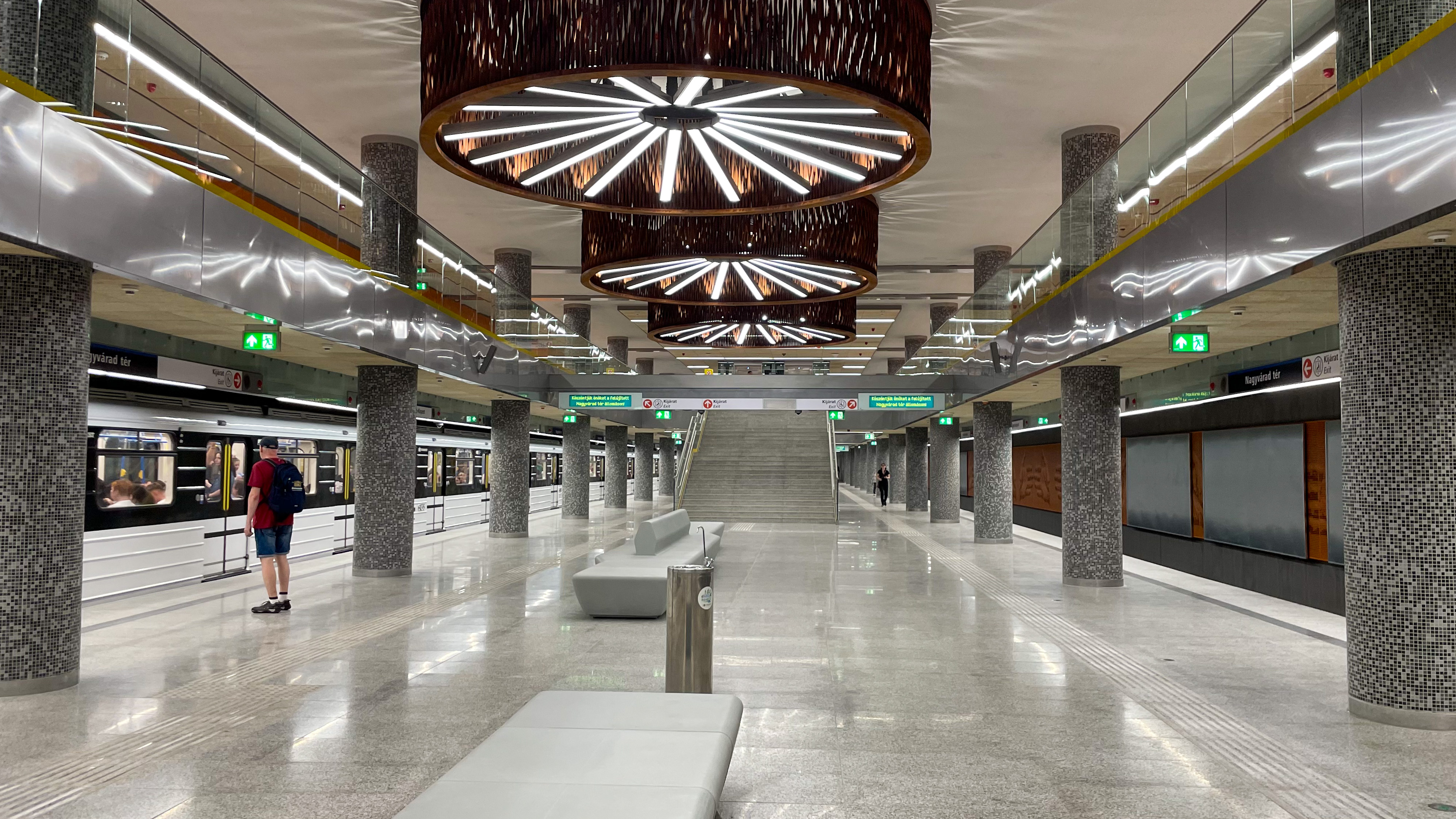

General information
- Location: Budapest; Hungary
- Coordinates: 47°28′45″N 19°05′20″E
- System: Budapest Metro station
- Platforms: 1 island platform

Construction
- Structure type: cut-and-cover underground
- Depth: 7.06 m (23.2 ft)

History
- Opened: 31 December 1976
- Closed: 14 May 2022
- Rebuilt: 22 May 2023

Services
Preceding station	Budapest Metro	Following station
Népliget towards Kőbánya-Kispest	Line 3	Semmelweis Klinikák towards Újpest-központ
Location

Nagyvárad tér is a station on the M3 (blue) line of the Budapest Metro. The area around the station is home to several hospitals and the Semmelweis University medical school. The station is named after the adjacent square Nagyvárad tér, which named after the former Hungarian city of Nagyvárad (now, Oradea, Romania).

The station was opened on 31 December 1976 as the southern terminus of the inaugural section of Line M3 between Deák Ferenc tér and Nagyvárad tér. On 20 April 1980 the line was extended to Kőbánya-Kispest.

== Connections ==
- Bus: 281
- Tram: 23, 24
