= Kőbánya-Kispest metro station =

Budapest metro station

Kőbánya-Kispest
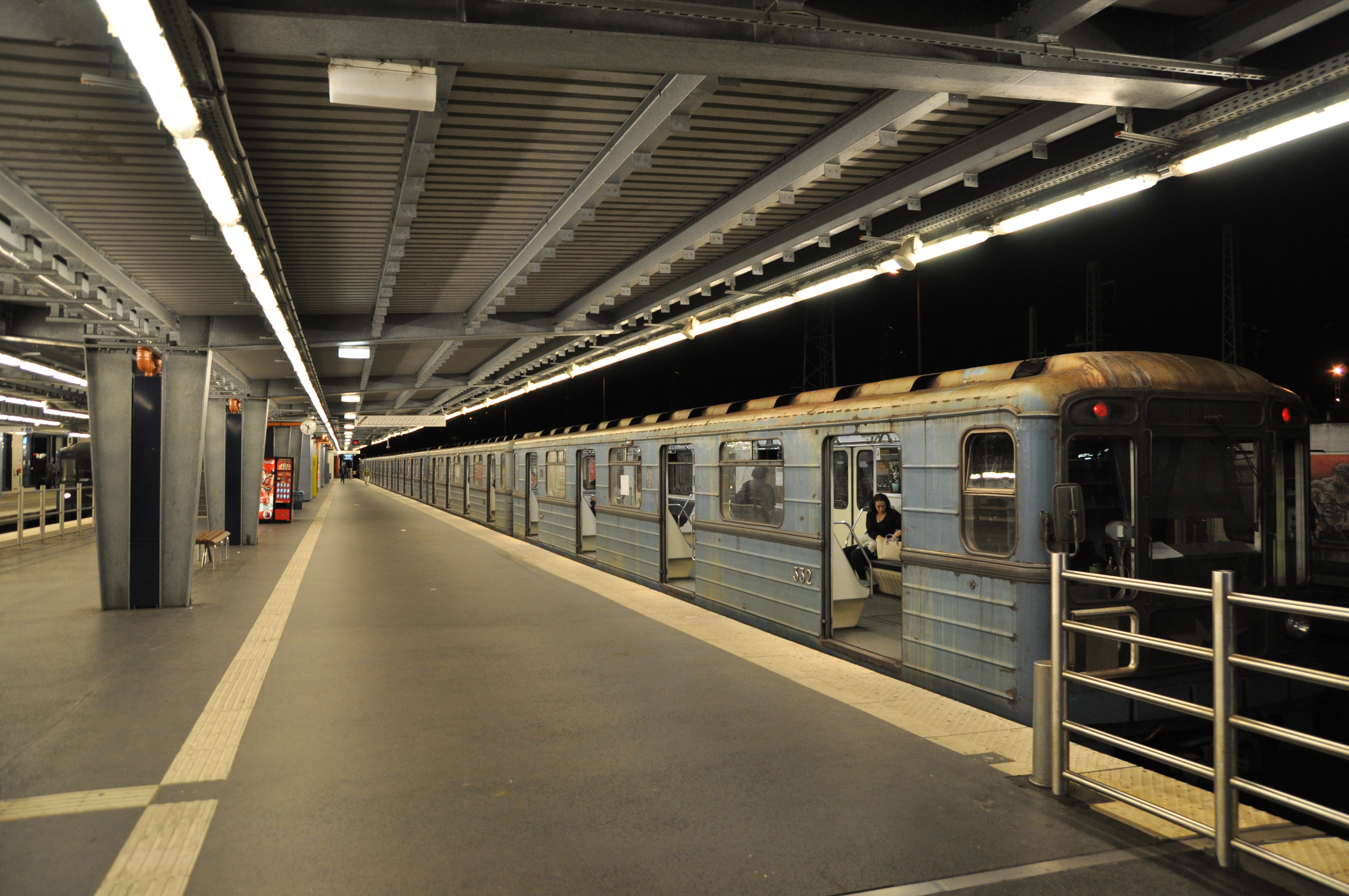

General information
- Location: Budapest; Hungary
- Coordinates: 47°27′48″N 19°08′57″E
- System: Budapest Metro station
- Platforms: 1 island platform

Construction
- Structure type: surface terminus

History
- Opened: 29 March 1980
- Rebuilt: 2011, 2019-2020

Services
Preceding station	Budapest Metro	Following station
Terminus	Line 3	Határ út towards Újpest-központ
Location

Kőbánya-Kispest is the southern terminus of the M3 Line (North-South line) of the Budapest Metro. It is the only station of the line that is above ground. The station was opened on 20 April 1980 as part of the extension from Nagyvárad tér.

The metro station is named after the train station next to the terminal, which lies on the border of the districts Kőbánya and Kispest. It is also a suburban bus terminal and a changing place of several city bus lines (68, 85, 85E, 93, 93A, 98, 98E, 136E, 148, 151, 182, 184, 193E, 200E - this run from here to Budapest Ferenc Liszt International Airport, 201E, 202E, 282E, 284E), making it the largest public transport hub in Southern-Pest. Hungarian people sometimes call this station Köki, which is short for Kőbánya-Kispest. Next to the station, there is a huge housing estate with concrete blocks of flats (Kispest microdistrict) and a shopping mall, named Köki Terminál. A bust of Ferenc Puskás is placed next to the shopping mall.

== Connections ==
- Bus: 68, 85, 85E, 93, 93A, 98, 98E, 132E, 136, 148, 151, 182, 182A, 184, 193E, 200E, 202E, 268, 282E, 284E
- Regional bus: 575, 576, 577, 578, 580, 581
