= Rákóczi Avenue =

Road in Budapest, Hungary

Coordinates: 47.4970°N 19.0700°E

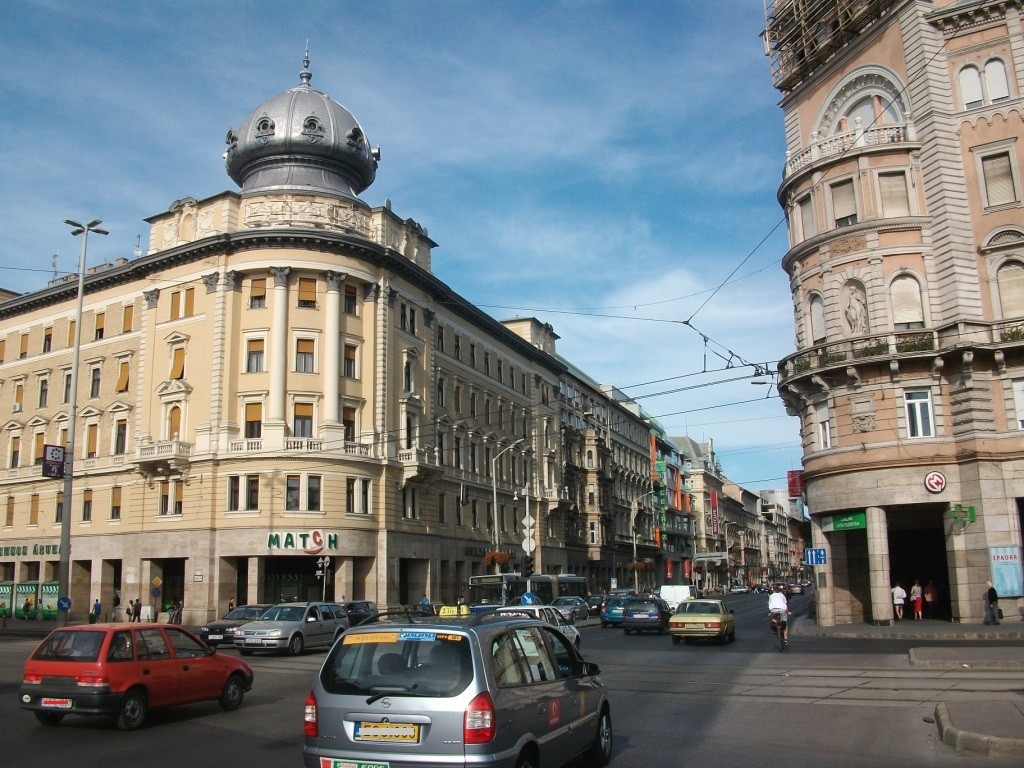
- Intersection of Rákóczi Avenue and the Grand Boulevard
- Interactive map of Rákóczi Avenue
- Native name: Rákóczi út (Hungarian)
- Former names: Hatvani út; Kerepesi út
- Namesake: Francis II Rákóczi

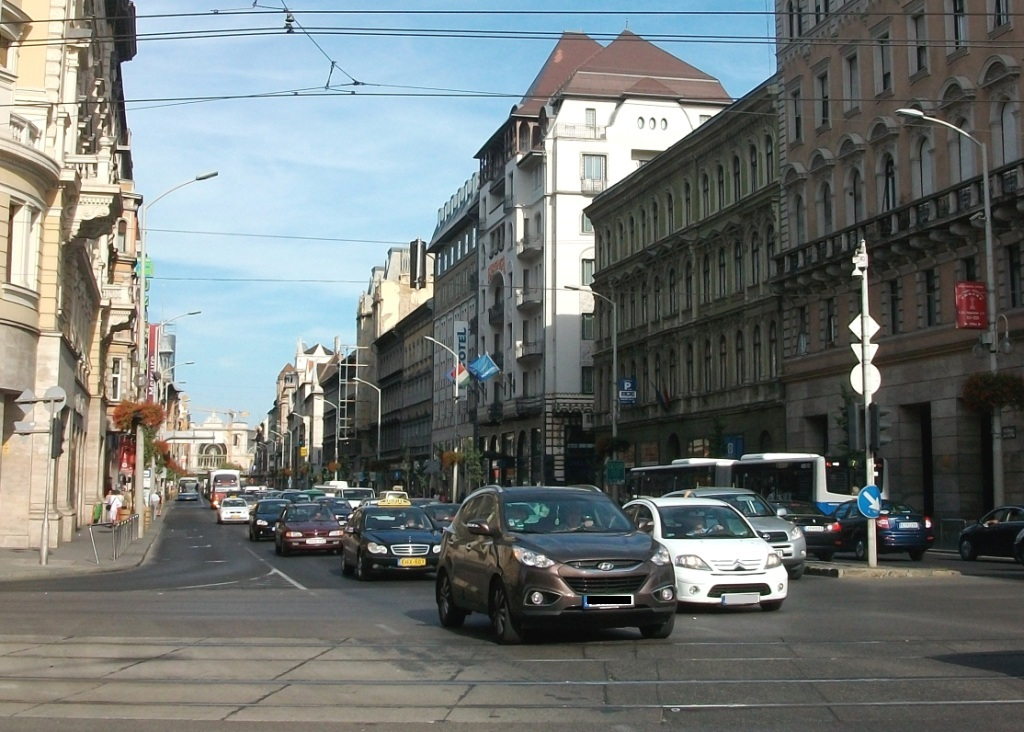
Rákóczi Avenue, Keleti Railway Station in the background

Rákóczi út (Hungarian pronunciation: [ˈraːkoːt͡si ˈuːt], Rákóczi Avenue) is one of the busiest arterial roads in Budapest, Hungary. It runs in an east-west direction through the city.

== Location ==
It starts at the Astoria, the intersection with Little Boulevard in the Inner City and runs to east between VII. and VIII. districts, crossing the Grand Boulevard until gets the Keleti Railway Station (the central inter-city and international railway terminal of Budapest).

== History ==
The ancestor of Rákóczi Avenue was Hatvani út (lit. "Road to Hatvan"), a medieval trading road, which ran from the eastern city gate of Pest (named Hatvani kapu, literally "gate to Hatvan", present day Astoria) to Northern Hungary. In the 19th century the road become more and more important due to urbanization and industrialization. In 1804 it was renamed Kerepesi út (literally "Road to Kerepes").

The former road was rebuilt in eclectic style after the 1884 grand opening of Keleti Railway Station. At the beginning of the 20th century it was one of the most prominent avenues of Budapest along with Andrássy Avenue. In 1906 it was renamed Rákóczi út (Rákóczi Avenue) after Francis II Rákóczi, when his remains returned to Hungary from Turkey and his long funeral march went along the avenue from St. Stephen's Basilica to Keleti Railway Station.

The first traffic light in Hungary was built at the intersection of Rákóczi Avenue and Grand Boulevard (Blaha Lujza tér) in 1926.

In the 1970s it was widened; the tram tracks were demolished in 1973 due to the grand opening of Metro Line 2 in 1972. Today Rákóczi Avenue is a six-lane arterial road, sometimes described as an urban motorway.

== Notable buildings ==
- Danubius Hotel Astoria (Astoria Szálló, in Kossuth Lajos street)
- Uránia National Movie Theatre (Uránia Nemzeti Filmszínház)
- Academy of Drama and Film in Budapest (Színház- és Filmművészeti Egyetem)
- Rókus chapel (Rókus kápolna)
- St. Rochus Hospital (Szent Rókus Kórház)
- National Theatre (1908 – 1964, demolished as part of the construction of Metro Line 2)
- Europeum (shopping mall)
- Keleti Railway Station

== Sources ==
- Budapest City Atlas, Dimap-Szarvas, Budapest, 2011, ISBN 978-963-03-9124-5
- Sugárútból autópálya (from avenue to motorway), Táj-Kert Blog
- Budapest enciklopédia, Corvina, 1981, ISBN 963-13-1248-8
- The first traffic light in Hungary
