= Budapest bus route 100E =

Bus route in Budapest, Hungary

Route 100E
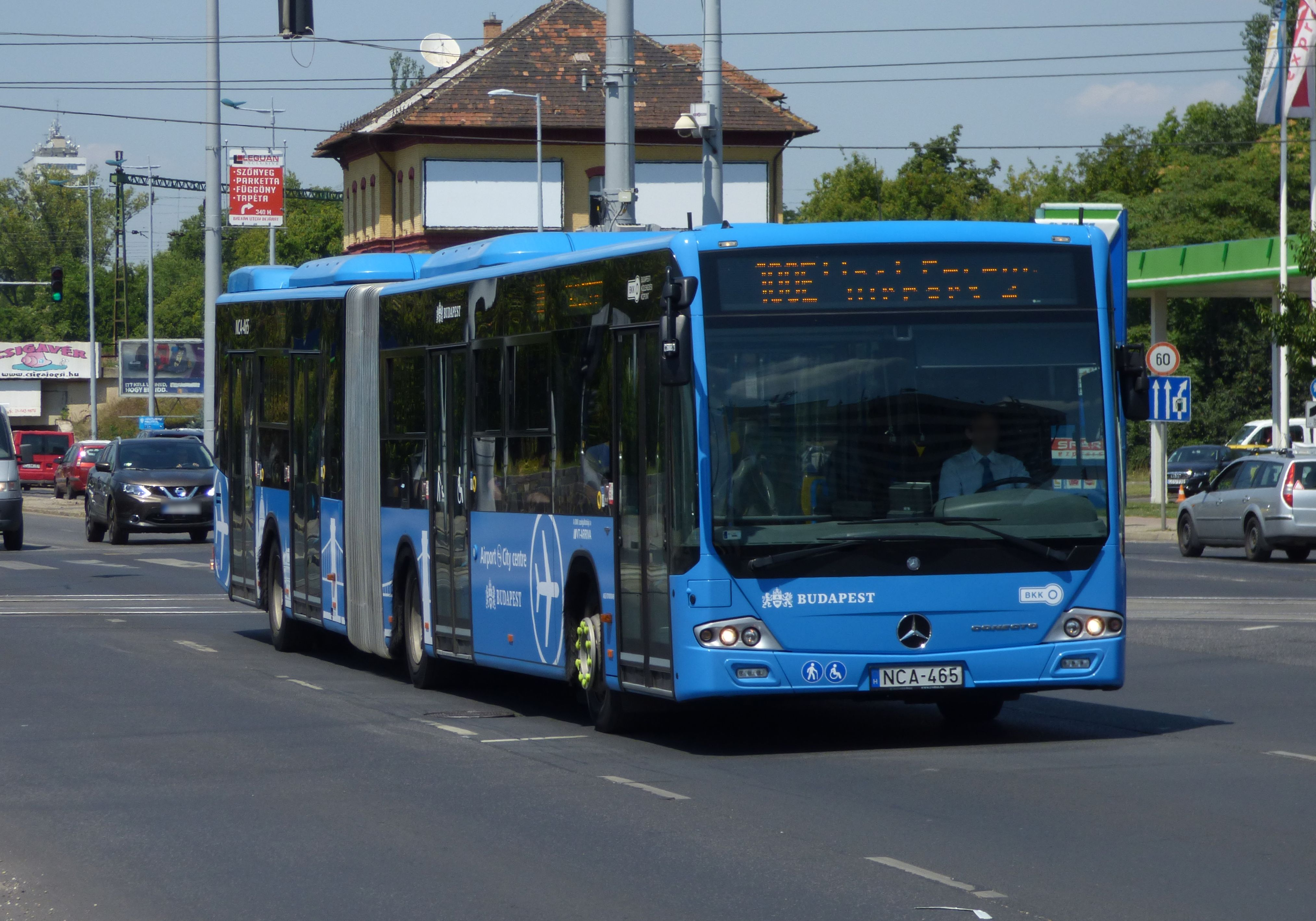

Overview
- Operator: ArrivaBus
- Depot: Bogáncs Street
- Vehicle: MAN Lion's City C18
- Status: active
- Began service: July 8, 2017

Route
- Start: Liszt Ferenc Airport 2
- Via: Kálvin tér Astoria
- End: Deák Ferenc tér

Service
- Level: Daily
- Frequency: Every 10 or 12 minutes
- Operates: Nonstop
Route map

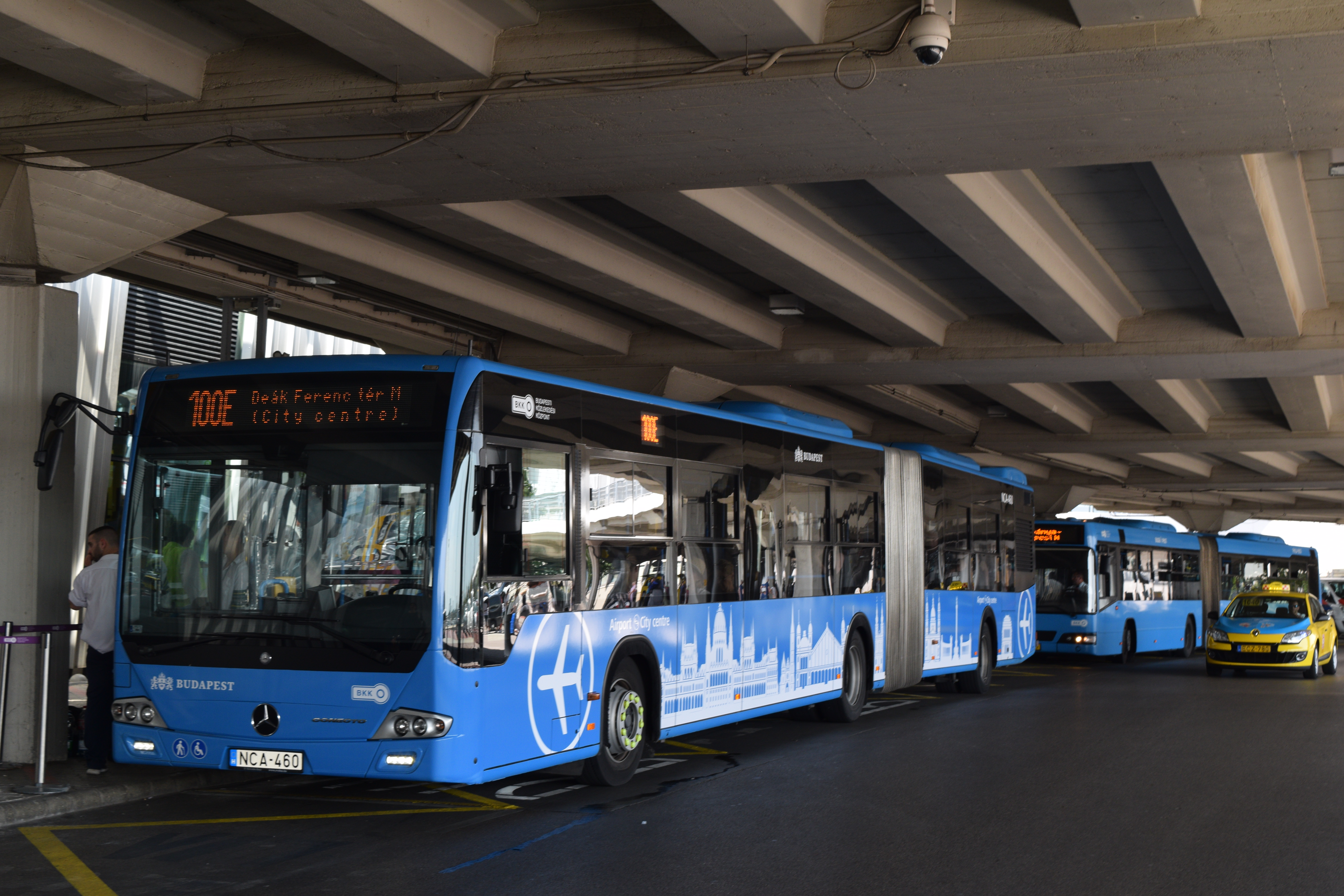
Uniquely designed Mercedes-Benz Conecto G

Route 100E is a bus route in Budapest that serves as an express service between Budapest Ferenc Liszt International Airport and downtown Pest. It is operated by ArrivaBus for Budapesti Közlekedési Központ (BKK) and requires a premium fare (2200 HUF one-way as of April 2023). The route operates at all times.

== History ==
Route 100E was introduced on July 8, 2017—a few days before the 17th FINA World Championships—to supplement the existing 200E service, in operation in some form since 1960. Frequency and operating hours were first extended on 18 May 2018. Since August 2022, 100E operates at all times. In April 2023, BKK added the English-language designation "Airport Express" to the route's destination signs as a pathfinding measure for non-Hungarian speakers.

BKK has always charged a premier fare on this route, although this fare's price has steadily increased over time, from 900 to 1500 HUF in July 2022 and then to 2200 HUF in April 2023. These price increases, as well as the route's contactless payment system, standalone on the BKK network, have been criticized.

According to BKK's internal data, 83% of the service's users are foreign visitors to Hungary.

== Route ==
Toward Deák Ferenc tér	Toward Liszt Ferenc Airport 2
Liszt Ferenc Airport 2 (terminus) – Repülőtéri bekötőút – Road 4 – Üllői út – Ferihegyi repülőtérre vezető út – Üllői út – Múzeum körút – Károly körút – Deák Ferenc tér M (terminus)	Deák Ferenc tér M (terminus) – Károly körút – Múzeum körút – Üllői út – Ferihegyi repülőtérre vezető út – Üllői út – Road 4 – Repülőtéri bekötőút – Liszt Ferenc Airport 2 (terminus)

== Stops and connections ==
100E (Liszt Ferenc Airport 2 ◄► Deák Ferenc tér M)
Travel time (↓) (minutes)	Stop name	Travel time (↑) (minutes)	Connections	Buildings / Monuments
0	Liszt Ferenc Airport 2 terminus	30	200E	Budapest Ferenc Liszt International Airport
29	Kálvin tér M getting off only (↓) getting on only (↑)	4	47, 48, 49; 72, 83, 972; 9, 15, 223E; 909, 914, 914A, 922, 922B, 923, 934, 950, 950A, 966, 979, 984, 985, 988	Metro station, Fővárosi Szabó Ervin Könyvtár, Hungarian National Museum
30	Astoria M getting off only (↓) getting on only between 0:04 and 4:47 (↑)	2	47, 48, 49; 72, 74, 972, 980; 5, 7, 8E, 9, 107, 108E, 110, 112, 133E; 599; 905, 905A, 907, 907A, 908, 908A, 909, 914, 914A, 922, 922B, 923, 931, 933, 933A, 934, 941, 950, 950A, 966, 969, 979, 984, 985, 988, 992, 997	Metro station, ELTE-Faculty of Humanities (BTK), Danubius Hotel Astoria, Dohány Street Synagogue
32	Deák Ferenc tér M terminus	0	47, 48, 49; 72, 972, 980; 9, 16, 105, 178, 210, 210B, 216; 909, 910, 912, 914, 914A, 922, 922B, 923, 931, 934, 943, 950, 950A, 966, 969, 979, 984, 985, 988, 992, 997	Metro station, Town Hall, Budapest Eye, Millennium Underground Museum
