= List of hotels: Countries H =

This is a list of what are intended to be the notable top hotels by country, five or four star hotels, notable skyscraper landmarks or historic hotels which are covered in multiple reliable publications. It should not be a directory of every hotel in every country:

== Haiti ==
- Christopher Hotel, Port-au-Prince
- Hôtel Montana, Port-au-Prince
- Hotel Oloffson, Port-au-Prince

== Hong Kong ==
- Baden-Powell International House
- China Hong Kong City
- Disney's Hollywood Hotel
- Dorsett Wanchai Hong Kong Hotel
- Eaton Hotel Hong Kong
- The Excelsior
- Four Seasons Hotel Hong Kong
- Grand Hyatt Hong Kong
- Hong Kong Disneyland Hotel
- Hong Kong Gold Coast Hotel
- Hong Kong Hilton
- Hong Kong Hotel
- Hong Kong SkyCity
- Hotel Indigo Hong Kong Island
- Hotel Panorama
- Hyatt Regency Hong Kong
- Hyatt Regency Sha Tin
- InterContinental Hong Kong
- International Commerce Centre
- International Finance Centre
- Island Shangri-La, Hong Kong
- JW Marriott Hong Kong
- Kowloon Shangri-La
- The Landmark Mandarin Oriental Hotel
- Langham Place, Hong Kong
- Langham Place Hotel
- Mandarin Oriental, Hong Kong
- Le Méridien Cyberport Hotel
- Novotel Century Hong Kong
- Novotel Citygate Hong Kong
- Novotel Nathan Road Kowloon Hong Kong
- Panda Hotel
- The Peak Hotel
- The Peninsula Hong Kong
- Regal Hotels International
- Ritz-Carlton Hong Kong, Kowloon
- Royal Park Hotel
- Royal Plaza Hotel
- W Hong Kong

== Hungary ==
=== Budapest ===
- Boscolo Budapest Hotel
- Continental Hotel Zara, Budapest
- Corinthia Hotel Budapest
- Danubius Hotel Astoria, Budapest
- Four Seasons Hotel Gresham Palace Budapest
- Hilton Budapest
- Hotel Gellért, Budapest
- InterContinental Budapest
- Kempinski Hotel Corvinus, Budapest

=== Győr ===
- Barokk Hotel Promenád Győr
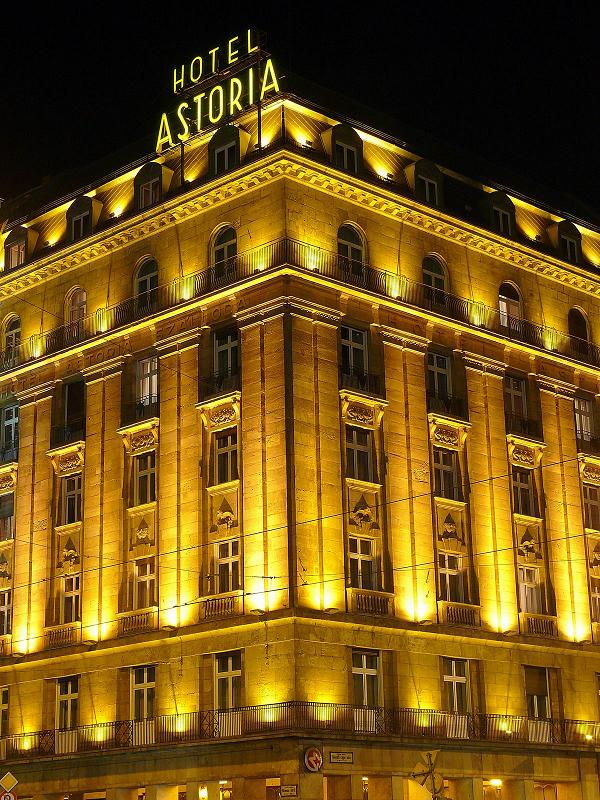
Danubius Hotel Astoria

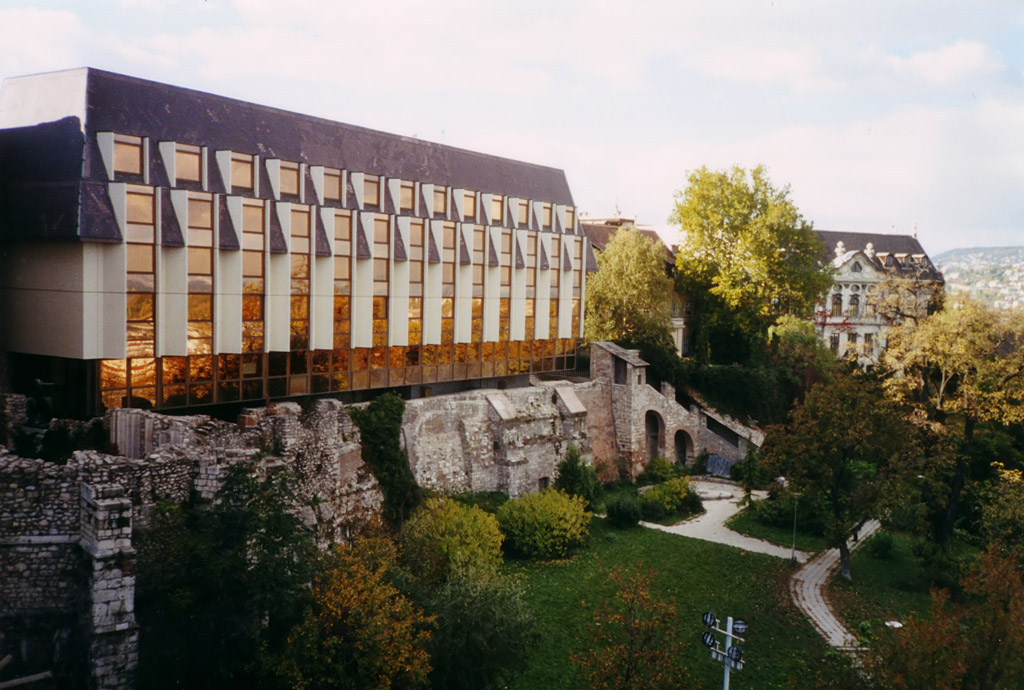
Hilton Budapest
