= Grand Boulevard (Budapest) =

Major thoroughfare in Budapest, Hungary

Coordinates: 47°29′59″N 19°04′10″E

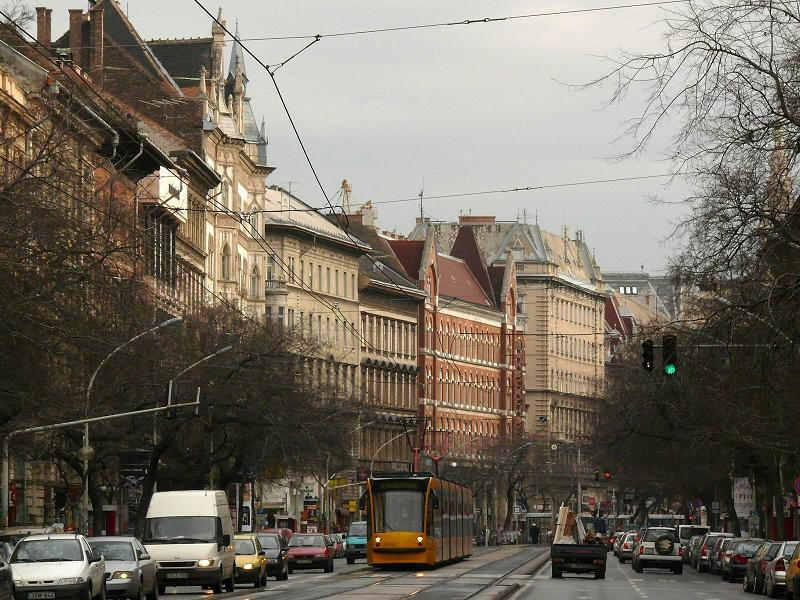

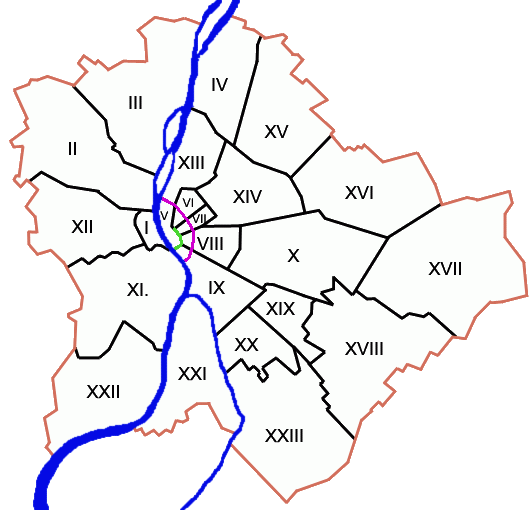
- Grand (purple) and Small (green) Boulevards of Budapest
- Native name: Nagykörút (Hungarian)
- Length: 4.5 km (2.8 mi)
- Width: 35–40 m
- Location: Budapest
- North end: Margaret Bridge
- Major junctions: Nyugati tér, Oktogon, Blaha Lujza tér
- South end: Petőfi Bridge

Nagykörút, also Grand Boulevard or Great Boulevard (also called "Big Ring Road", "Grand Ring Road", "Great Ring Road"), is one of the most central and busiest parts of Budapest, a major thoroughfare built by 1896, Hungary's Millennium. It forms a semicircle connecting two bridges of the Danube, Margaret Bridge on the north and Petőfi Bridge on the south. Usually the part inside and around this semicircle is counted as the city centre of Budapest (see Belváros).

== Meaning ==
Nagykörút is actually a colloquial name of its five parts which connect to each other: (from north to south) Szent István körút, Teréz körút, Erzsébet körút, József körút and Ferenc körút; these are the names the traveller will find on the map and the buildings. They are named after the districts of Budapest, which they pass through: VI. Terézváros, VII. Erzsébetváros, VIII. Józsefváros, IX. Ferencváros. The only exception is Szent István körút, which is the border of Lipótváros (northern half of District V.) and Újlipótváros (southern part of District XIII.). However, its original name was Lipót körút, but the district had been renamed to Szentistvánváros in 1937, also the boulevard became Szent István. Most of citizens did not support renaming, so the district got back its original name after World War II, but not the boulevard. Nagykörút is usually meant to include its Pest part (i.e., the east side of the Danube), but it might be applied to its extension on the Buda side as well (in this latter sense, Margit körút will be its sixth part).

== Location ==
It consists of a 35- to 40-metre-wide, about 4.5-kilometre-long road (not counting the bridge and the Buda side) with a tram line in the middle. It crosses a few major squares such as Nyugati tér, Oktogon and Blaha Lujza tér, basic points of reference for the locals. The four major roads which cross it are Váci út (north), Andrássy Avenue (northeast; part of the World Heritage), Rákóczi út (east) and Üllői út (southeast).

== Features, notable spots ==
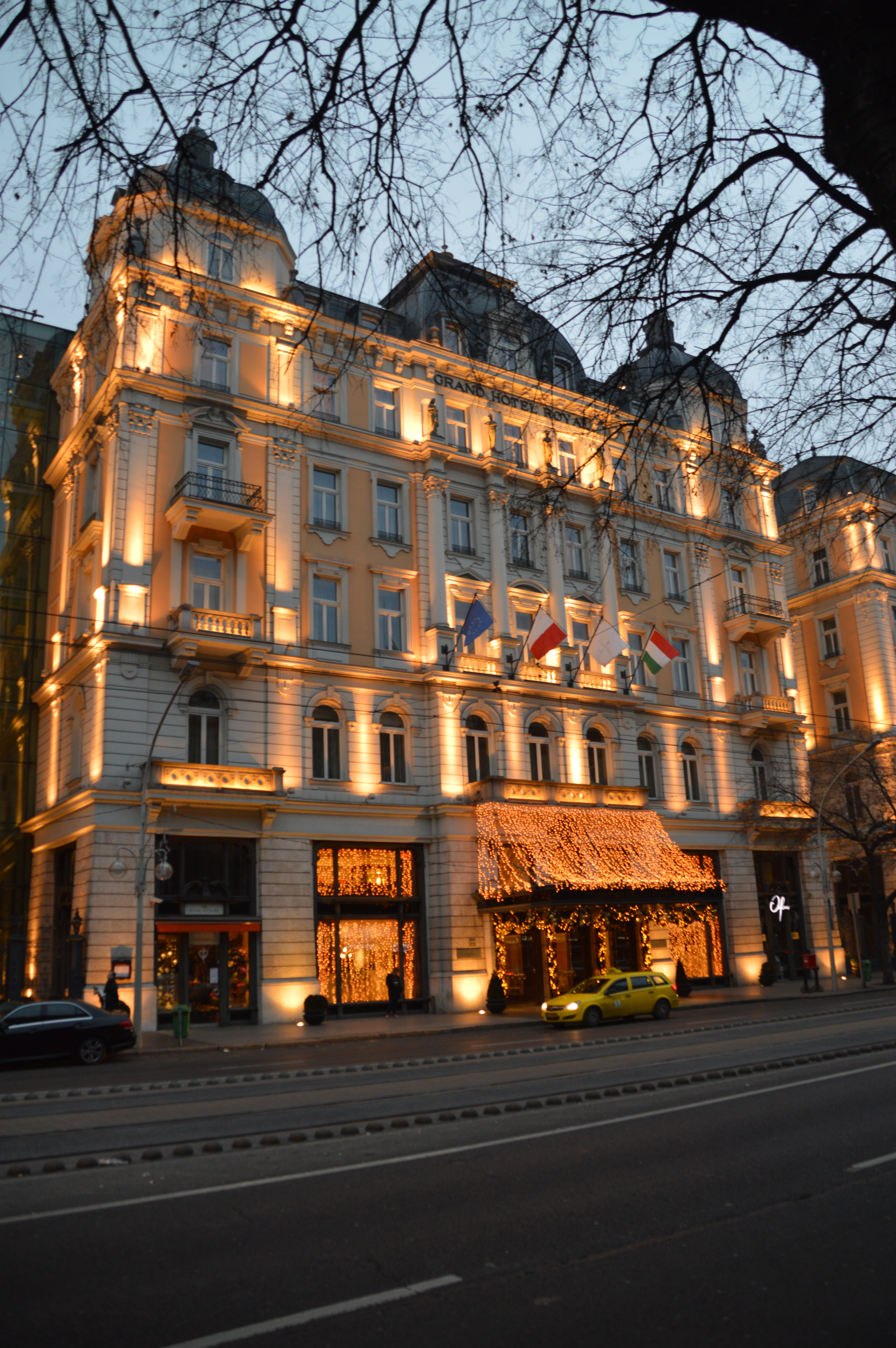
Corinthia Hotel Budapest (formerly Grand Hotel Royal), a 5-star hotel located on Grand Boulevard

On the Nagykörút one can find (from north to south) the Comedy Theatre (Vígszínház, 1896), Western Railway Station (Nyugati pályaudvar, 1877, built by Gustave Eiffel's team), Radisson Blu Béke Hotel (1913), Corinthia Hotel Budapest (former Grand Hotel Royal, 1896), the New York Café, today Boscolo Budapest Hotel (1894), and the Art Nouveau palace of the Museum of Applied Arts (1896). Among the modern landmarks are the Skála Metró shopping centre (1984) and the WestEnd City Center, a shopping mall (1999). Beside them, there are many small and bigger shops, stores on its either side, and mostly turn-of-the-century residential buildings above them.

== Transport ==
=== Metros ===
The four metro lines have five stations on Nagykörút, at the junctions of the above four roads: (from north to south) Nyugati pályaudvar (M3), Oktogon (M1), Blaha Lujza tér (M2), Rákóczi tér (M4) and Corvin-negyed (M3 again).

=== 4 and 6 trams ===
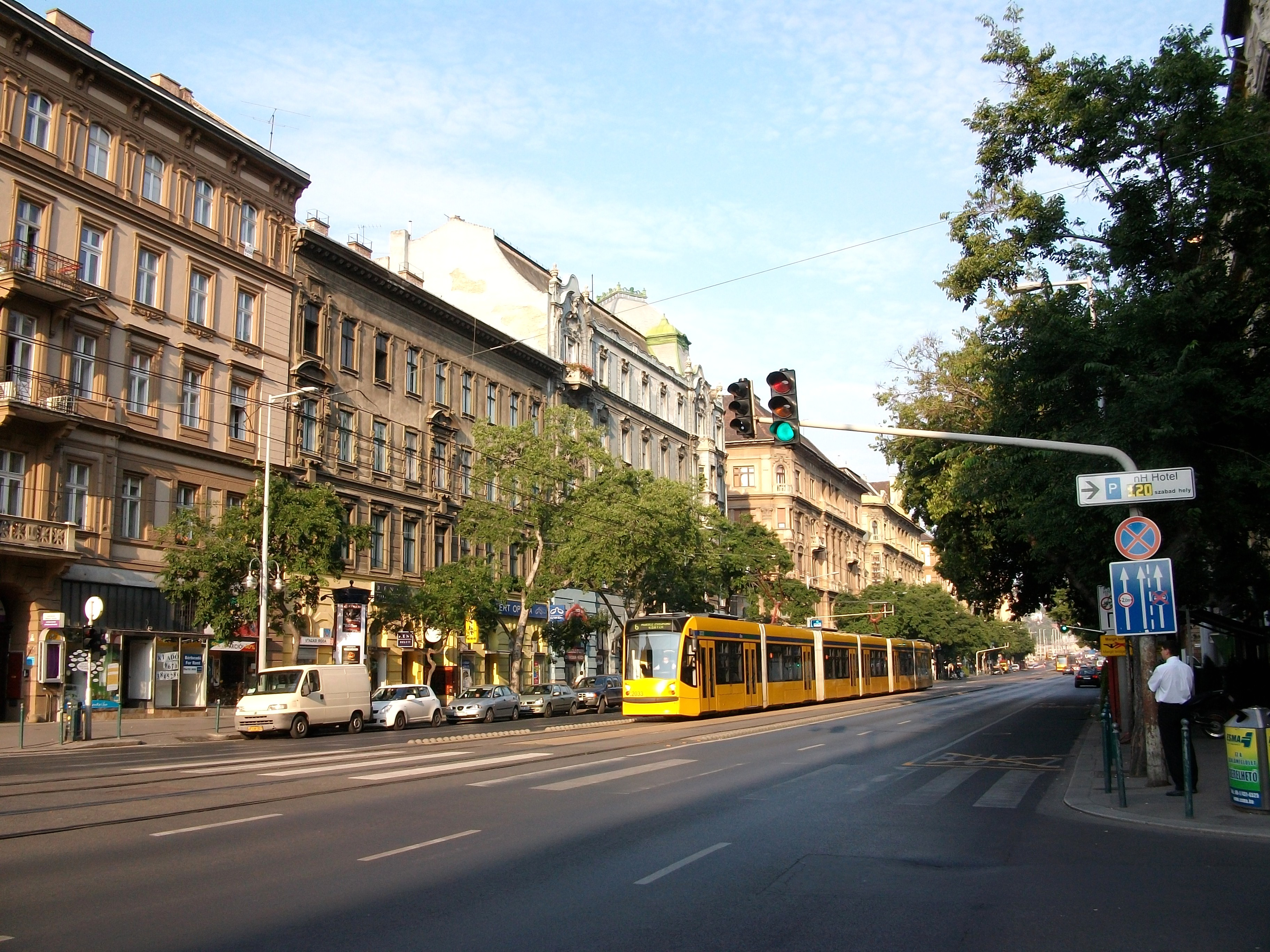
Combino Supra at the St. Stephen Boulevard part of the Grand Boulevard. The Combinos of Budapest are the second longest tramcars in the world.

A characteristic vehicle of the Grand Boulevard is the tram no. 4 and 6, reaching Buda both in north (Széll Kálmán tér) and south Újbuda-központ (line 4) and Móricz Zsigmond körtér (line 6). The line dates back to 1887 and it has since extended to 8.5 km in length and 21 stations to become the busiest tram line of Europe, carrying 200,000 travellers a day. (The routes of tram lines 4 and 6 differ only in their last two stops in the south.)

Its trams (no. 4 and 6), a unique type in Budapest, have been replaced by low-floor Siemens Combino Supra vehicles, the longest in Europe (54 m), after July 1, 2006. Tram stations were elevated and in places widened and modernized, ramps added, the electric cables renovated and some rail sections replaced during the reconstruction, which cost altogether 3.4 billion forints.

== Further ring roads in Budapest ==
There are three further ring roads in Budapest:

- the Small Boulevard (Kiskörút), with the length of about 1.5 km, inside the semicircle of Nagykörút (including Károly körút, Múzeum körút and Vámház körút),
- the Hungária körgyűrű, an even bigger ring road outside Nagykörút (approx. 13 km), which is not always thought of as a single entity (it includes Róbert Károly körút, Hungária körút and Könyves Kálmán körút).
- the M0 motorway, which encircles the three-quarters of the metropolitan area, connecting motorways M1, M7, M6, M5, M4, M3 and M2.
