= Significant events of the Hungarian Revolution of 1956 =

Listed below are some significant events in the Hungarian Revolution of 1956, which began on October 23, 1956, and was brutally crushed by Soviet forces in November.

- On October 22 - one day before the Revolution - Technical University students established the "Association of Hungarian University and College Students" (MEFESZ), expressed their famous 16 claims and organized a rally to the Józef Bem statue of Budapest to pledge solidarity with the Polish demonstrators.
- On October 23 in the afternoon the crowd marches to the Józef Bem statue and read out the 16 claims.
- On October 23 in the evening a crowd of 100,000 was waiting at the Parliament for Imre Nagy, the reformist Communist politician whom they wanted to change the face of the country. When Nagy appeared at last at 9 p.m., he started his speech by calling the people "comrades" and the crowd started to whistle and boo at the much-awaited speaker in protest against the word introduced under the Communist regime. Nagy promised reforms but called for the demonstrators to go home. Part of the crowd marched to the state radio instead, put it under siege and occupied it after heavy fighting.
- On October 23, in the evening the 18 m high statue of Joseph Stalin in Budapest's City Park was toppled, dragged to the National Theatre and there broken to small pieces. Afterwards the place where the statue had been standing has been jokingly referred to as "Boots Square", since the only things that remained of Stalin's statue were his boots.
- On October 25 a crowd of thousands at the Budapest city centre's Astoria juncture made friends with the crew of a Russian tank row and pinned Hungarian flags on the tanks. When the people saw Russian tanks approaching from another direction with Hungarian flags on them, the word spread in the crowd: "The revolution has won!"
- Hours later dozens of people died and hundreds were injured at the Parliament building when persons still not identified, and (in a subsequent onslaught) Soviet tanks opened fire on the people, part of whom had arrived from Astoria. At the nearby Communist Party national headquarters also wild shooting started among various Hungarian and Soviet units. Rounds by a Soviet tank hit the party meeting room where top party leaders were negotiating with Soviet comrades including Georgy Malenkov. The party officials fled into the cellar.
- On October 26 freedom fighters at the Corvin köz resistance centre forced Russian tanks to flee by laying porcelain plates borrowed from a nearby public kitchen on the street pavement. The Soviet tank units, which had suffered heavy losses at Corvin köz in the previous days, did not dare to drive through the plates, believing them to be weapons.
- On October 30 several tanks of the Hungarian army arrived to Köztársaság tér (Republic Square) (today: Pope John Paul II square) to relieve the Communist Party's Budapest headquarters which was under siege. The crew of the tanks did not know Budapest. When they saw another tank firing, they didn't realize that the other tank belonged to the freedom fighters, and they started to attack the same building – which was in fact the headquarters they were supposed to save. This intervention ended the siege quickly.
- On October 30 the freedom fighters, after occupying the party headquarters on Republic Square, dug huge holes in the square, using heavy vehicles. They searched for secret underground rooms because previously rumours spread that the police of the regime kept and tortured political prisoners there. Some of the holes were as deep as 10 metres. Finally nothing was found.
- On October 31 the state radio aired the famous sentence in which they admitted lying for years in favour of the dictatorship: "We lied at night, we lied at day, we lied in every wavelength" (a quotation from writer István Örkény)
- On November 7 – the anniversary of the Russian October Revolution – the freedom fighters of the Tűzoltó Street resistance group placed Hungarian as well as red flags on all of the buildings under their control to send the message to the Soviet soldiers that the Soviets are fighting against a real workers' revolution and draw parallels of the 1956 Hungarian Revolution with the Russian Revolution of 1917.
- On November 11: The fall of the Revolution in Csepel, the 21st district of Budapest.
- On November 18 a seven meter long Hungarian flag rolled in the wind from the torch of the Statue of Liberty in New York City, pinned there by a group of Hungarian immigrants, who also spread out an even bigger banner saying: "SAVE HUNGARY, END GENOCIDE". The event received huge publicity in the U.S. and world media
