= Smashy =

Hungarian fast-food restaurant brand

- The Smashy restaurant in Budapest
- Industry: Restaurants
- Founded: 2023, Budapest, Hungary
- Headquarters: Budapest, Hungary
- Key people: Simon Tóth, Máté Tóth
- Products: Fast food (hamburgers, French fries)
- Website: smashyclub.com

Smashy is a Hungarian fast-food restaurant brand whose menu is based on the smash burger concept. Its first restaurant opened in Budapest, on Baross Street near Kálvin tér. In 2024 the brand was bought from its previous owner by the founders of Simon's Burger. In May 2025 it opened its first restaurant outside Hungary, in New York City, near Union Square.

== History ==
Smashy's first restaurant opened in Budapest at 4 Baross Street, near Kálvin tér. It initially operated with a small, focused menu of two types of smash burger, fries and soft drinks.

Simon Tóth and Máté Tóth bought Smashy from its previous owner in 2024. After the change of ownership the brand continued to operate under its existing concept, while the owners began exploring opportunities for international expansion.

According to Forbes Hungary, the Smashy brand was chosen over Simon's Burger for entering the American market because its simpler, less restrictive branding and concept were considered better suited to it. The US investment was in the range of several hundred million Hungarian forints and was made without outside investors.

=== International expansion ===
Smashy's first restaurant abroad opened on 3 May 2025 in Manhattan, New York City, at 42 Union Square East, near Union Square. The owners described it as the first step in the brand's international expansion. The New York location is primarily a takeaway operation.

== Menu ==
Smashy's menu is based on the American smash burger style, in which the beef patty is pressed thin on a griddle while cooking, producing a crisp, caramelised crust.

The Budapest restaurant has a short menu centred on two products, the Classic Cheeseburger and the House Cheeseburger, served with fries and drinks. The New York restaurant has a similarly limited menu, consisting of single- and double-patty burgers, fries and soft drinks.

== Locations ==
- (Hungary) Budapest, Kálvin tér
- (United States) New York City, Union Square
