= Simon's Burger =

Hungarian fast-food restaurant chain

- The Simon's Burger restaurant in Mohács, Hungary
- Type: Private
- Industry: Fast-food restaurants
- Founded: 1 September 2022; 4 years ago in Budapest, Hungary
- Founders: Simon Tóth; Máté Tóth
- Headquarters: Szervita tér 8, Budapest, Hungary
- Number of locations: 29 (as of 2026)
- Area served: Hungary, Slovakia, Romania, Austria, United States
- Key people: Simon Tóth and Máté Tóth (co-CEOs)
- Products: Hamburgers, French fries, milkshakes
- Number of employees: c. 450
- Website: simonsburger.hu

A Simon's Burger restaurant in Budapest

Simon's Burger is a Hungarian fast-food restaurant chain specialising in smash burgers. It was founded in 2022 by brothers Simon Tóth and Máté Tóth, and is named after the former. As of 2026, the chain operates 29 restaurants in Hungary, Slovakia, Romania and Austria.

== History ==
According to the founders, they first encountered the smash burger technique during a trip to the United States. The company was established on 1 September 2022, and its first restaurant opened on 23 October 2022 on Október 6 Street in Budapest. The company later began to expand through franchising.

In 2023, the founders appeared on the Hungarian version of Shark Tank (Cápák között), broadcast by RTL.

The company subsequently expanded to other European markets. Under the name Smashy, it opened a restaurant in New York City.

On 14 June 2026, the company opened its first drive-through restaurant in Mohács.

On 12 September 2026, Simon's Burger opened its first restaurant in Romania, in Cluj-Napoca.

== Menu ==
The menu consists mainly of smash burgers, French fries and milkshakes. For the burgers, the patties are pressed flat on a griddle during cooking, which produces a browned crust.

== Locations ==
As of 2026, Simon's Burger operates 26 restaurants in Hungary, including 11 in Budapest and its agglomeration and others in cities such as Debrecen, Győr, Pécs, Szeged and Miskolc. Outside Hungary, it has one restaurant each in Košice (Slovakia), Cluj-Napoca (Romania) and Parndorf (Austria).

== Marketing ==
The company uses social media platforms such as Instagram and TikTok for marketing. It uses a mascot named Jimmy Jam, which appears at restaurant openings and in social media content.

Hungarian media have compared the chain's branding to that of the American chain Five Guys; Five Guys uses a predominantly red-and-white colour scheme, whereas Simon's Burger uses green and white.

== Recognition ==
In 2025, Forbes Hungary featured the founders on its cover. Simon Tóth received the Future Manager Special Award for 2024 from the Hungarian National Association of Managers and the Foxconn Group.
