= Hilton Budapest =

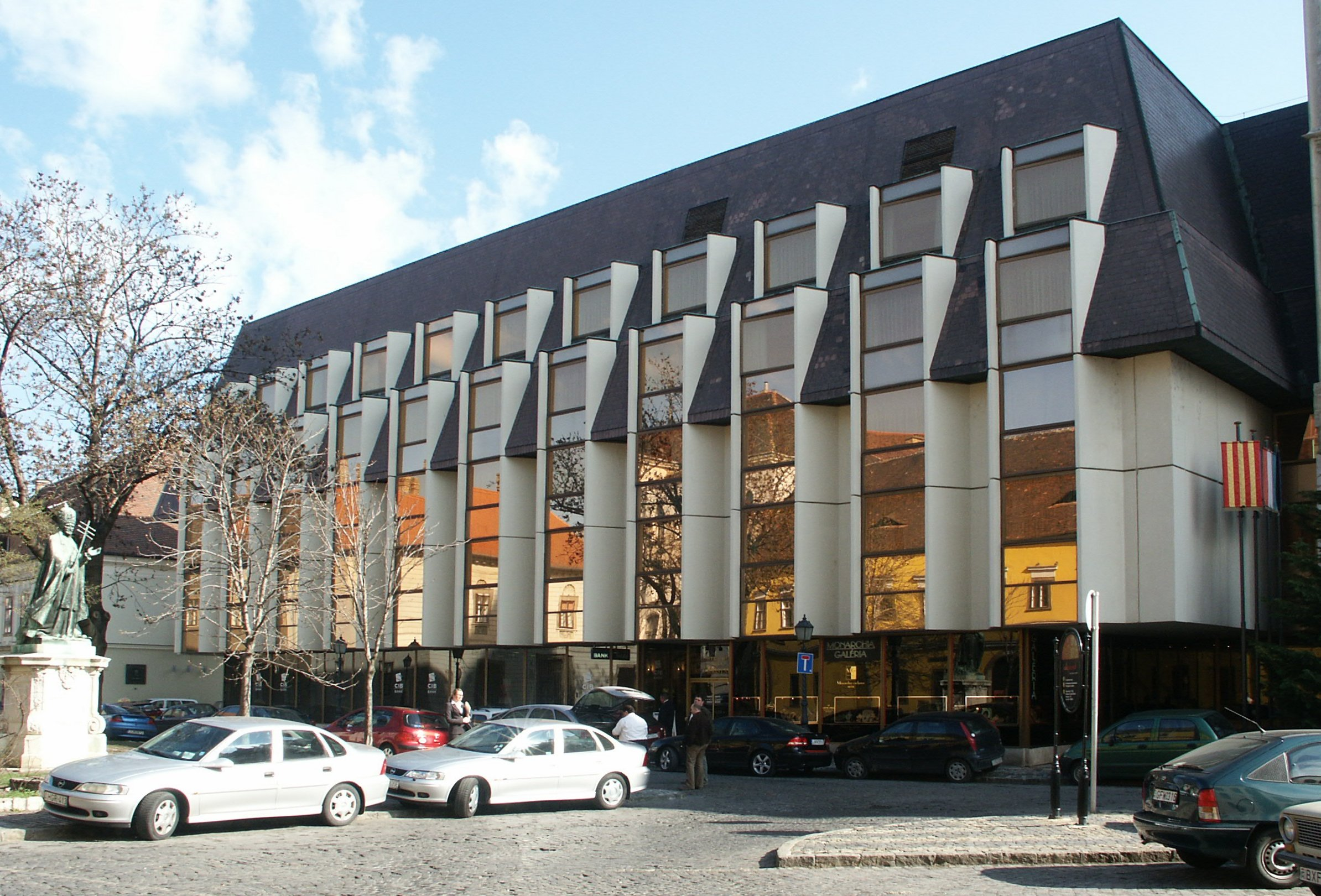

- Location within Budapest

General information
- Location: Budapest, Hungary, 1-3 Hess András tér, 1014 Budapest, Hungary
- Coordinates: 47.5025806°N 19.0314037°E
- Opened: January 1, 1977
- Owner: Danubius Hotels Group

Design and construction
- Architect: Béla Pintér
- Known for: beautiful views

Other information
- Number of rooms: 322

Website
- Official Website

Hilton Budapest is a non-classified hotel located in the historic Buda Castle District, a UNESCO World Heritage Site. The hotel is a part of the Hilton Hotels & Resorts brand, operated by the Danubius Hotels Group.

The hotel building includes the renovated parts of the 13th-century Dominican cloister and monastery. The popular Budapest attractions Fisherman's Bastion and Matthias Church are close to the hotel.

In 2012 the TripAdvisor placed it on the 5th place in the List of top 10 hotel rooms in the world with the most beautiful views.

== See also ==
- List of Jesuit sites
