= Barokk Hotel Promenád Győr =

- Location within Hungary

General information
- Location: Győr, Hungary, 9022 Győr, Kenyér köz 4. (Jedlik Ányos u. 9.)
- Coordinates: 47.689122°N 17.633284°E

Technical details
- Floor count: 2

Other information
- Number of rooms: 11

Website
- promenadhotelgyor.hu/en

Barokk Hotel Promenád Győr is a 4 stars hotel in Győr, a popular spa town in Hungary.

The hotel is located in the historic city center and the origins of its building are from 17th century.

== See also ==
- List of hotels in Hungary
