= Belváros =

Belváros (Hungarian, 'inner city', 'city centre' or 'downtown') may refer to:

- City Centre (Miskolc)
- Inner City (Budapest)
