= Kálvin tér =

Square in Budapest, Hungary

Coordinates: 47°29′22.90″N 19°03′42.55″E

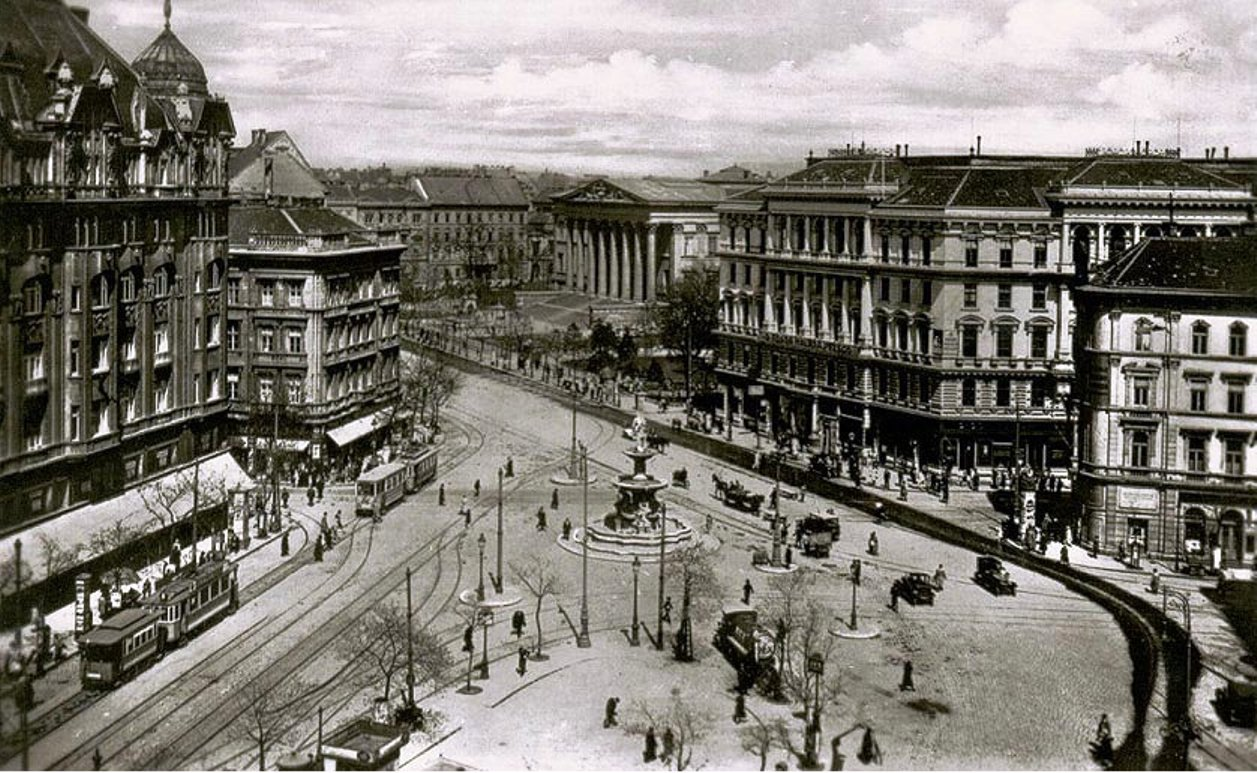
Kálvin Square in 1896

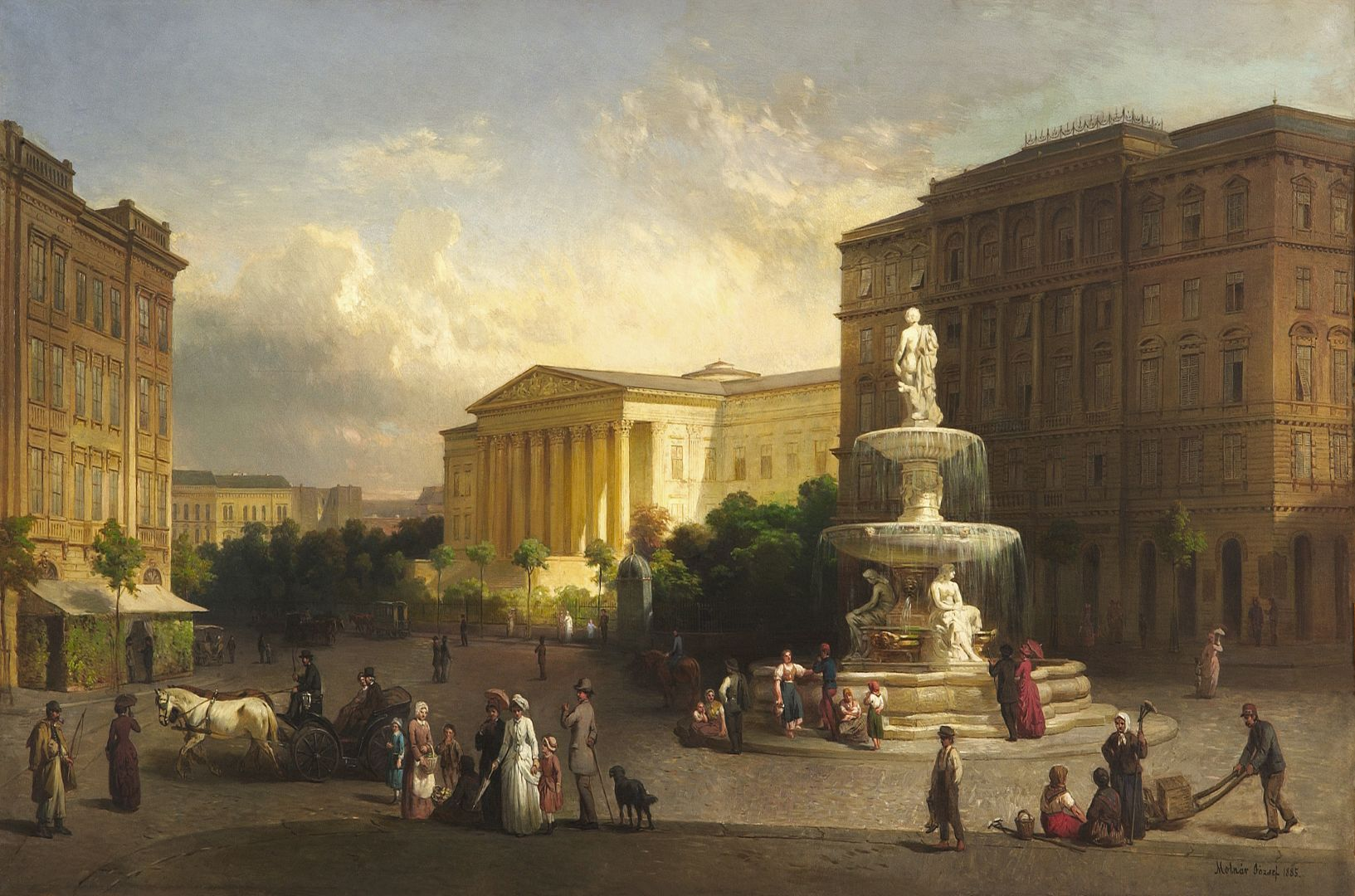
József Molnár Kalvin Ter, 1885

Kálvin tér (English: Calvin Square) is a major square and intersection in the city center of Budapest, the capital of Hungary. It was named after the French Protestant Reformer John Calvin (Kálvin János in Hungarian) due to the large Reformed Church located there.

The square is located in Pest at the junction of the 5th (Belváros-Lipótváros), 8th (Józsefváros) and 9th (Ferencváros) districts. Roads which converge at the square include the 'Kiskörút' (Inner Circuit, encompassing Múzeum körút ('Museum boulevard') north of the square, and Vámház körút to the south), Üllői út ('Üllő road'), Baross utca ('Baross street'), and Kecskeméti utca ('Kecskemét street').

Being a major thoroughfare and locality, the square is a major transport hub with tram, bus, and trolleybus routes serving the square. The Kálvin tér station on the M3 (North-South) line, and M4 of the Budapest Metro is located here.

The Hungarian National Museum is near Kálvin tér.

== See also ==
- Small Boulevard
- Street names of Budapest
