= Astoria, Budapest =

Road junction in Budapest, Hungary

Coordinates: 47°29′40″N 19°3′36″E

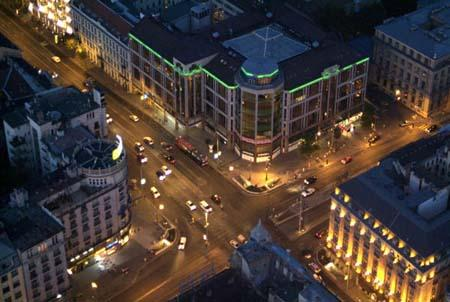
Astoria at night

Astoria is the colloquial, unofficial name of a major road intersection in the Budapest city centre, and it can also refer to a station of the M2 metro line. It is named after Grand Hotel Astoria at its corner.

The intersection is one of the most important junctions in Budapest because it is the crossing point of Rákóczi út and Small Boulevard. At its corner can be found the Humanities Faculty of the Eötvös Loránd University and the Hungarian National Museum beside it. Dohány Street Synagogue is located in the opposite direction, around 200 m far from this junction.

Colloquially, a short section of the roads originating from the actual intersection, reachable by a few minutes of walking, can be also named Astoria (as in a neighborhood), for example "Az Astorián lakom" (I live on the Astoria) does not imply having a residence neighboring the actual intersection (which has few residential buildings), rather one near the intersection along one of the major roads.

== Transportation ==
The neighbouring metro stations are Calvin Square and Ferenc Deák Square along the Small Boulevard and Square of the Franciscans and Lujza Blaha Square along Rákóczi Road.

Trams only run in the north-south direction, given that the east-west lines were discontinued in 1972. The reconstruction of the latter direction has been on the agenda ever since. Cycling is hampered by heavy car traffic and the presence of bus lanes on the side of the road in the east-west direction, while a bicycle lane facilitates the movement of cyclists in the north-south direction. For a long time, pedestrians could only cross from one side of the intersection on the surface via the small roundabout, the pedestrian crossings touching the tram stop platforms, but in 2024 a zebra crossing was also built on Rákóczi Street.
