= Danubius Hotels Group =

Company

Danubius Hotels
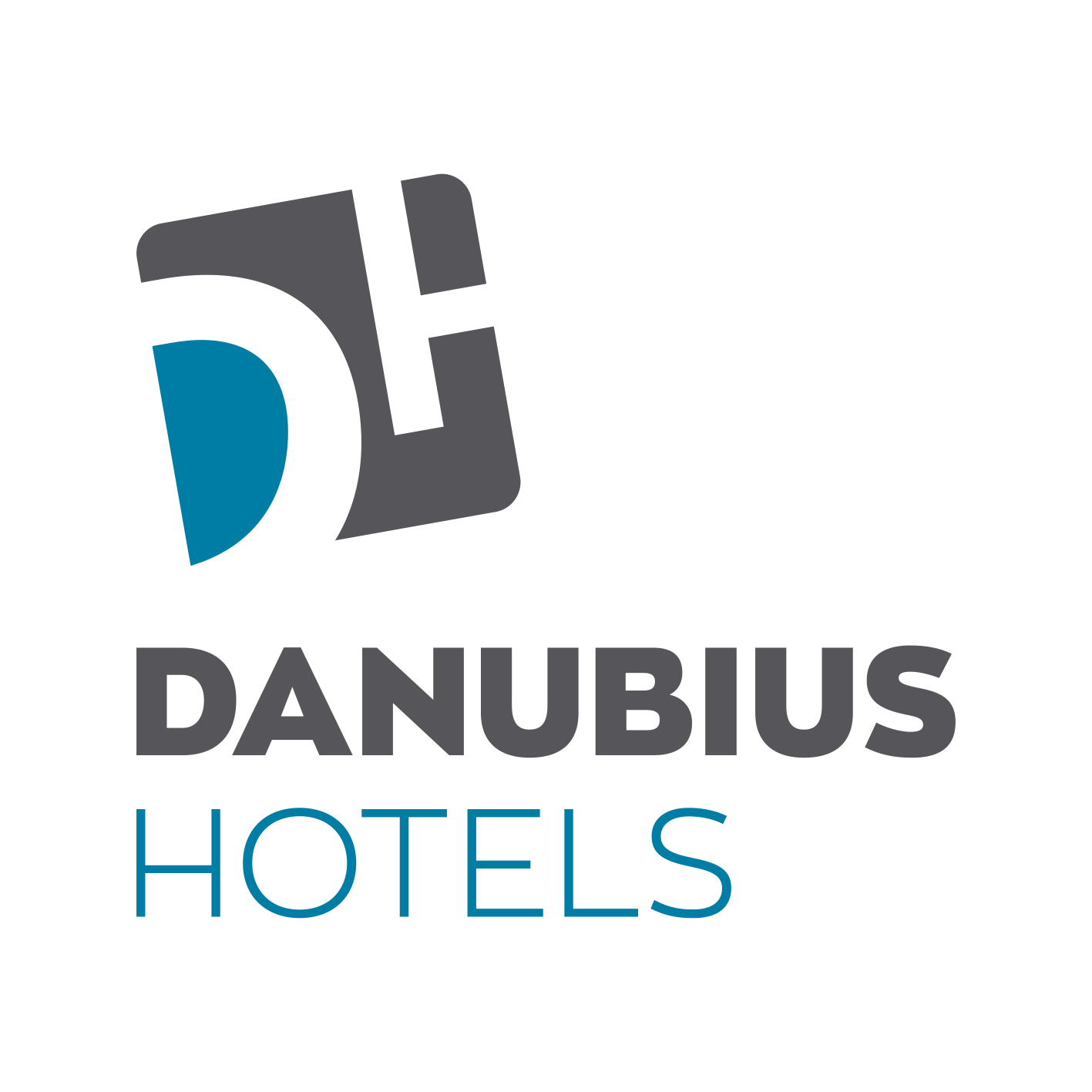
- Type: Public
- Traded as: BPSE: DANUBIUS; BUX Component
- Industry: Hospitality industry, Tourism
- Founded: 1972
- Headquarters: Budapest, Hungary
- Key people: Balázs Kovács (CEO)
- Products: Hotels, Spas
- Number of employees: 4,354
- Website: www.danubiushotels.com

Danubius Hotels and Spas Group is the largest hotel group in Hungary, with 56 hotels located in Hungary, Great Britain, Czech Republic, Slovakia, and Romania.

== History ==
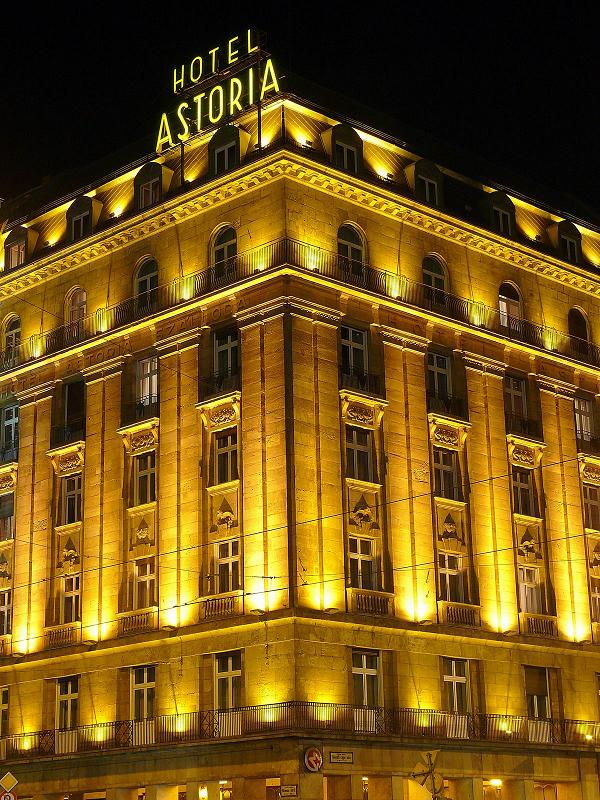
Hotel Astoria

Danubius Hotels Group was established by the former Ministry of External Trade to create and develop spa tourism in Hungary. The state-owned company first began managing hotels in April 1972 with the acquisition of the already-operational Grand Hotel Margitsziget and Hotel Helikon in Keszthely. It also was granted the building permit for the Budapest Hilton.

The company was privatized as Danubius Hotels, PLC, on 31 July 1991, and its stock was listed on the Budapest Stock Exchange in 1992. In 1996, it successfully applied for 85% of the property rights of Hungária Szálloda Rt. (HungarHotels) at the State Privatization Company’s (ÁPV Rt.) written contest and 100% property right was gained in 2004.

The Danubius Hotels Group first began expansions abroad in November 1999, with the purchase of Hotel Villa Butterfly in Marienbad, Czech Republic. One year later, it purchased 65% property right of Léčebné Lázně a.s. (Marienbad, Czech Republic), and as a result, 31 properties, 4 spa centers, and 40 thermal sources came under its ownership. In 2001, the Romanian Public Limited Company, as an interest of Danubius Hotels, gained 82,17% of 1000 hotel rooms and other properties and medicinal facilities located in Sovata, Romania, on a privatization contest. Danubius Hotels acquired its hotels in Slovakia in 2002 with the purchase of 67% of Slovenske Liecebne Kupele a.s. spa complex.

As of 2004, Danubius became co-operator of the world-famous Gundel Restaurant and connecting businesses (Bagolyvár, Wine Public House, Winery in Mád and Eger) and currently owns two-thirds of Gundel.

Danubius Hotels Group occupies 124th place on HOTELS Magazine's list of the world's 300 largest hotel operators.

== Brands ==
=== Danubius Health Spa Resorts ===
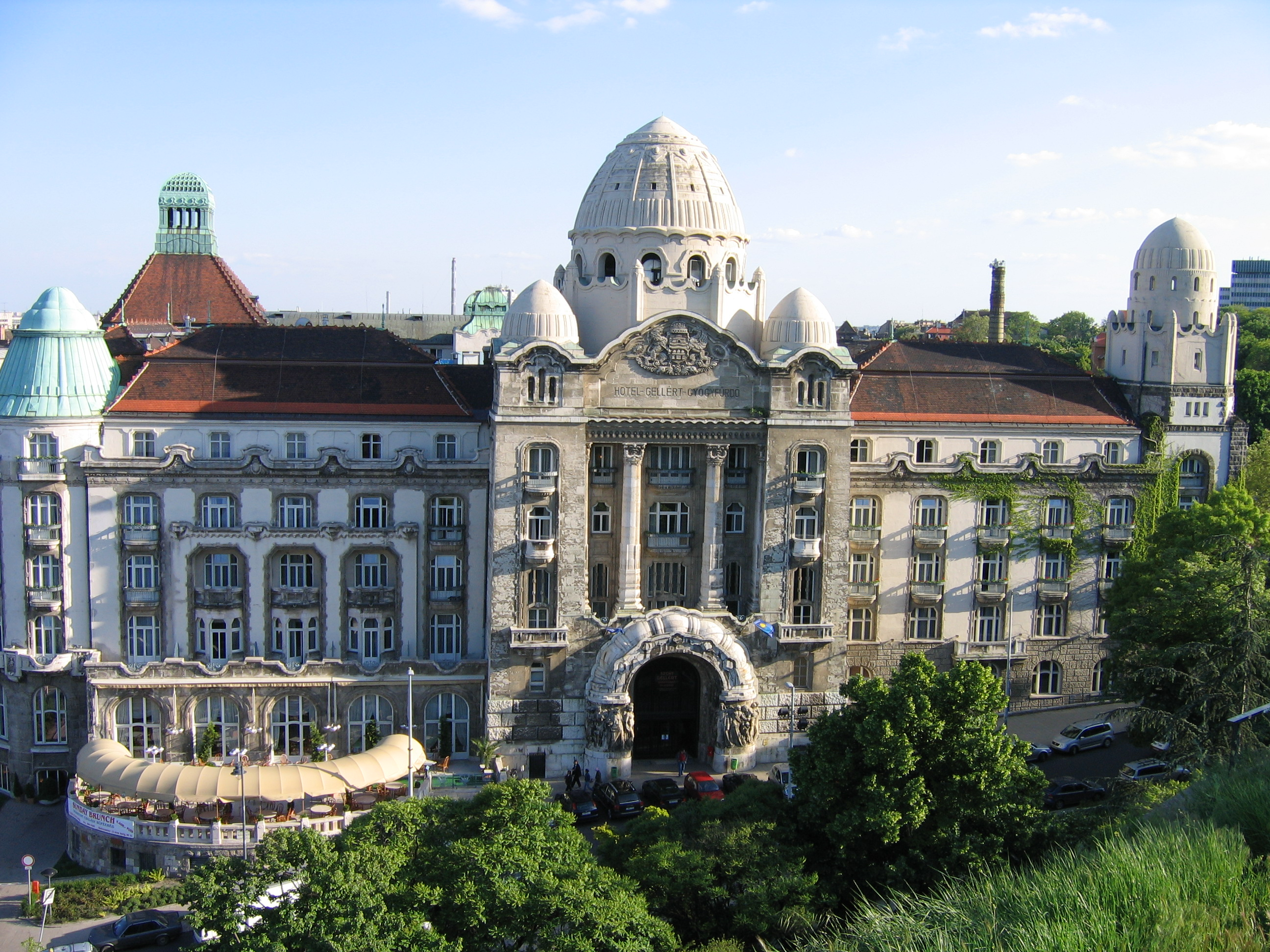
Hotel Gellért

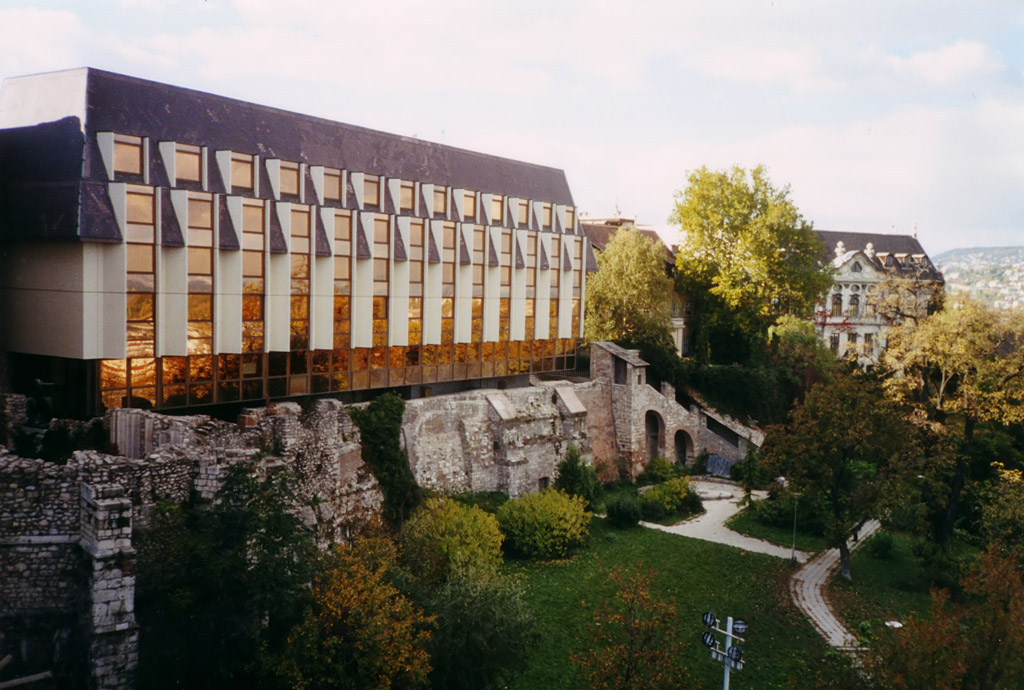
Hilton Budapest

Danubius Health Spa Resort hotels are located in Hungary, the Czech Republic, Slovakia, and Romania. Most 4-star spa and wellness hotels belong to this hotel brand. Services include bathing, spa and wellness treatments, beauty care, and fitness. Materials used for the treatments are natural (mud, natural spring).

=== Danubius Hotels ===
The Properties at Danubius Hotels are 4-star city hotels, which can be found in Budapest and London. In Budapest, Danubius' properties include Danubius Hotel Gellért, and Danubius Hotel Astoria.

=== Further members of Danubius Hotels Group ===
Other 3, 4, and 5-star hotels of Danubius Hotels Group have various offers. Among these, in Budapest can be found the Hilton Budapest, Radisson Blu, and Best Western hotels operated in a franchise system.
