= Blaha Lujza tér metro station =

Budapest metro station

Blaha Lujza tér
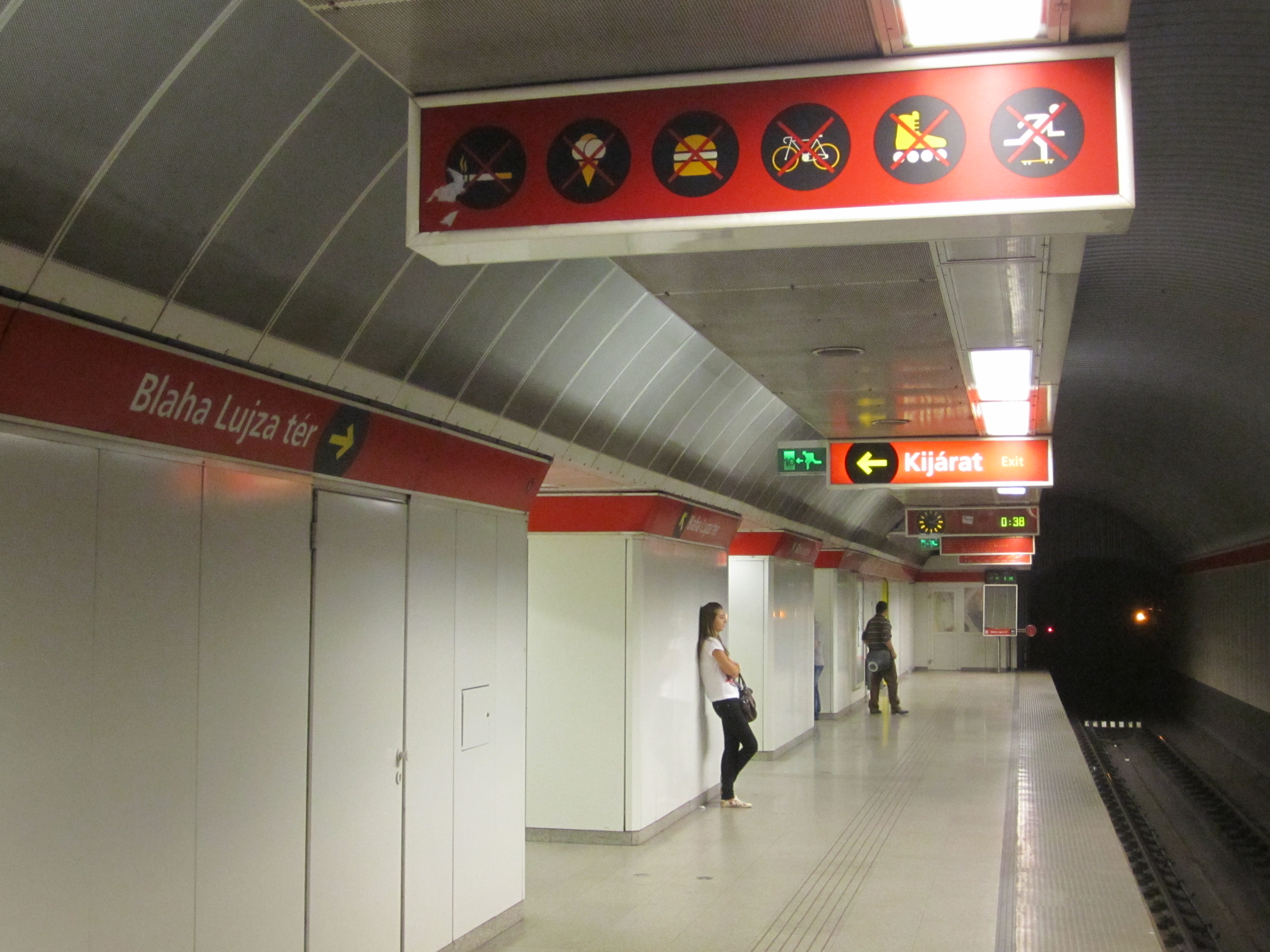

General information
- Coordinates: 47°29′48″N 19°04′12″E
- System: Budapest Metro station
- Platforms: 1 island platform

Construction
- Structure type: bored underground
- Depth: 26.35 metres (86.5 ft)

History
- Opened: 2 April 1970
- Rebuilt: 2004

Services
Preceding station	Budapest Metro	Following station
Astoria towards Déli pályaudvar	Line 2	Keleti pályaudvar towards Örs vezér tere
Location

Blaha Lujza tér is a station of the M2 (East-West) line of the Budapest Metro. It is a major transport junction. The station was opened on 2 April 1970 as part of the inaugural section of Line M2, between Deák Ferenc tér and Örs vezér tere.

The square is named after Lujza Blaha, an actress (1850–1926). The Hungarian National Theater was located on the square until 1964 when it was demolished (by explosion) because of the subway construction.

The 111-year-old New York Café is located at walking distance from it. It was renovated and re-opened in 2006 May by the Italian hotel chain Boscolo Hotels Inc.

== Connections ==
- Tram
  - 4 Széll Kálmán tér – Újbuda-központ
  - 6 Széll Kálmán tér – Móricz Zsigmond körtér
  - 28 Blaha Lujza tér (Népszínház utca) – Izraelita temető
  - 28A Blaha Lujza tér (Népszínház utca) – Új köztemető (Kozma utca)
  - 37 Blaha Lujza tér (Népszínház utca) – Új köztemető (Kozma utca)
  - 37A Blaha Lujza tér (Népszínház utca) – Sörgyár
  - 62 Rákospalota, MÁV-telep – Blaha Lujza tér (Népszínház utca)
- Trolleybus
  - 74 Csáktornya park – Károly körút (Astoria)
- Bus: 5, 7, 7E, 8E, 99, 107, 108E, 110, 112, 133E, 217E

== Gallery ==
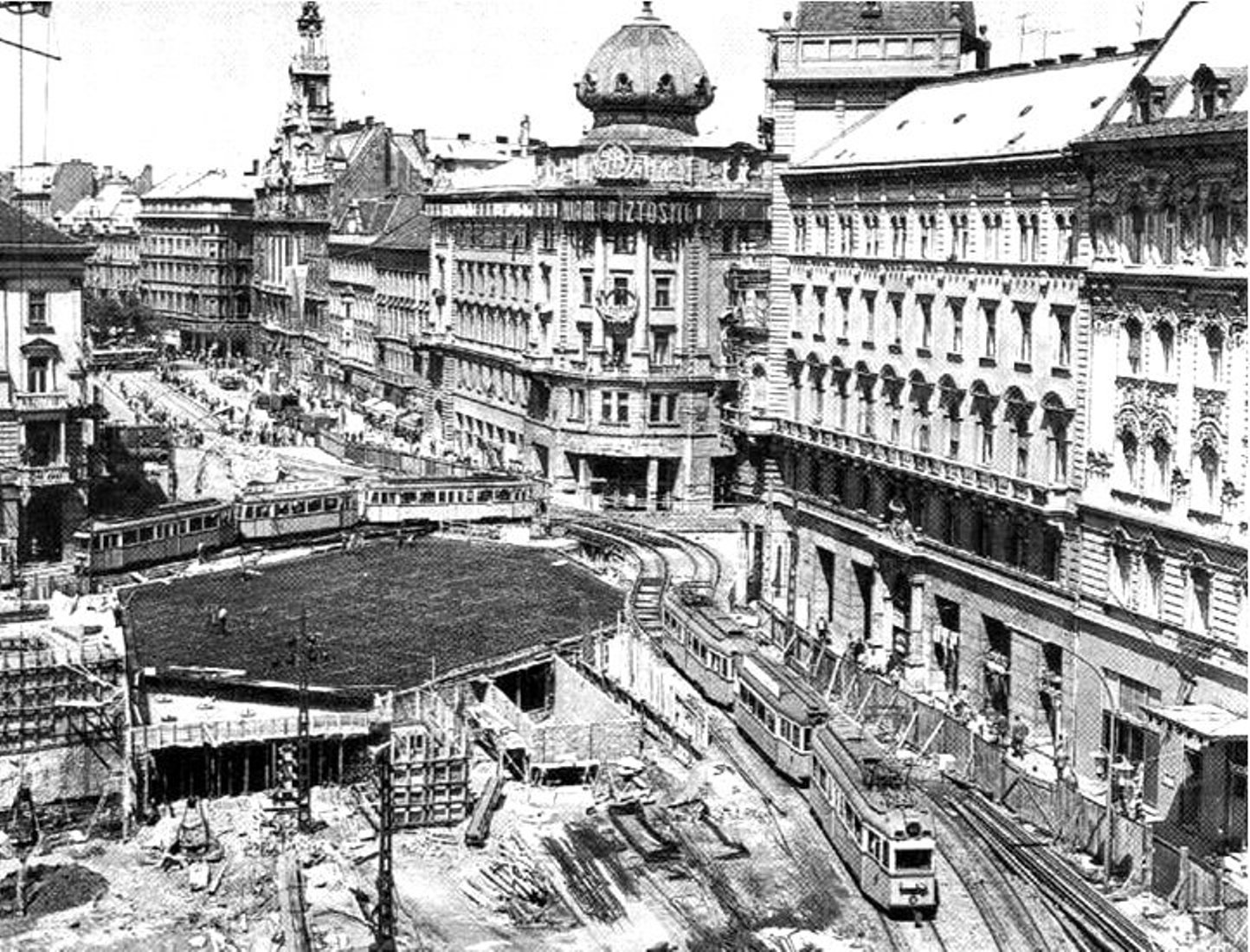
Metro works at Blaha Lujza square in the 1960s

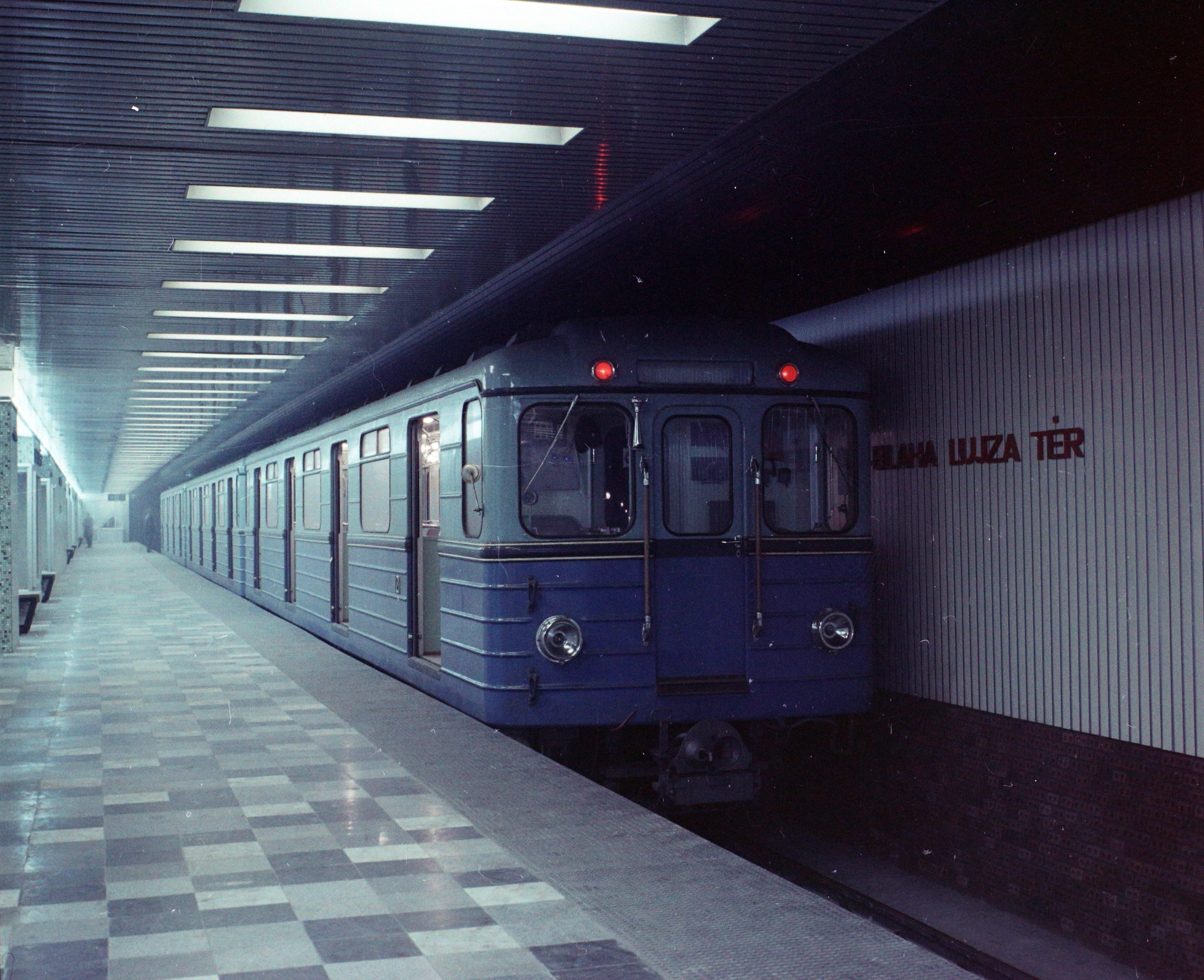
Blaha Lujza tér ter station in 1970, shortly after opening

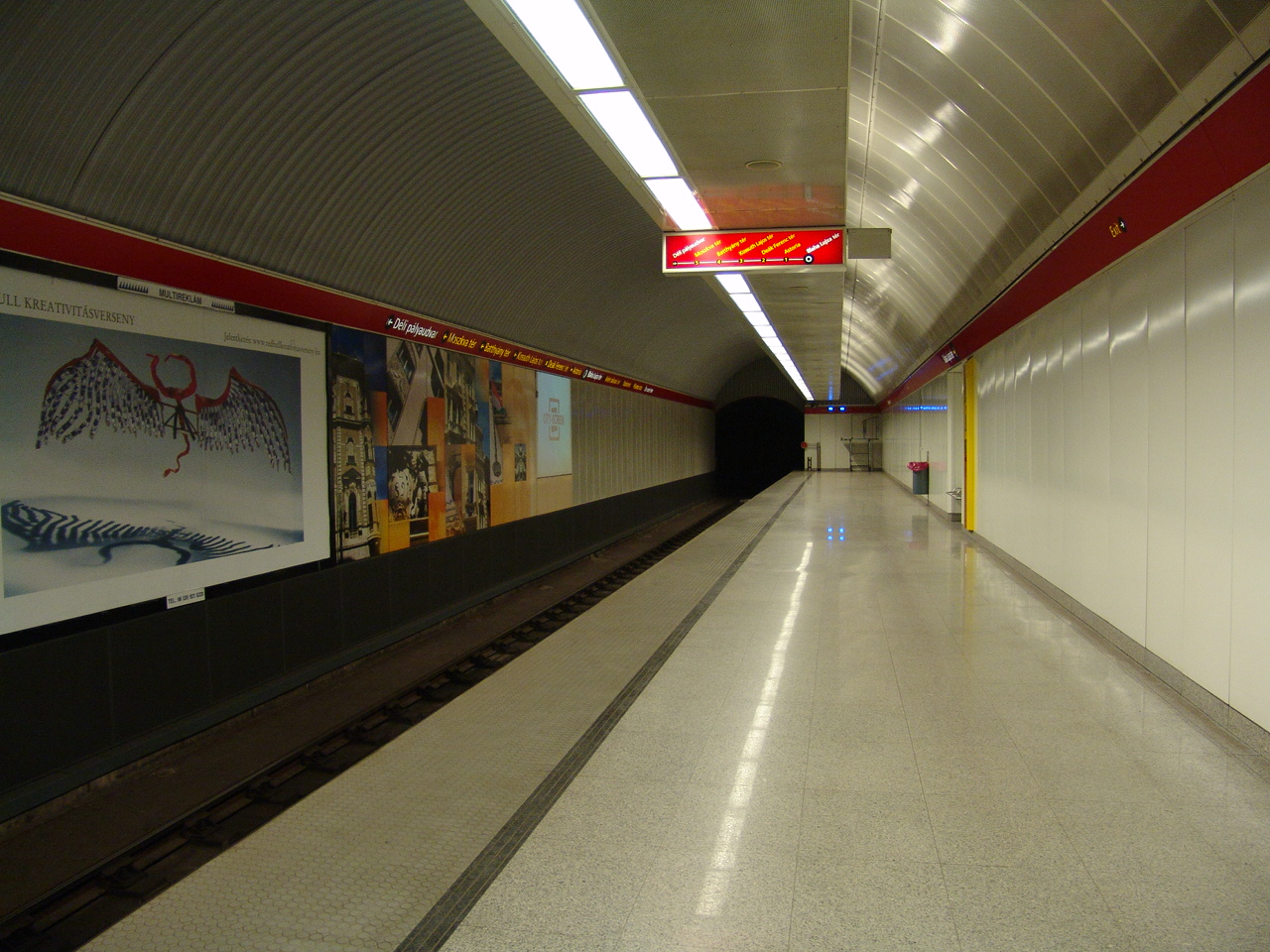
Platform view

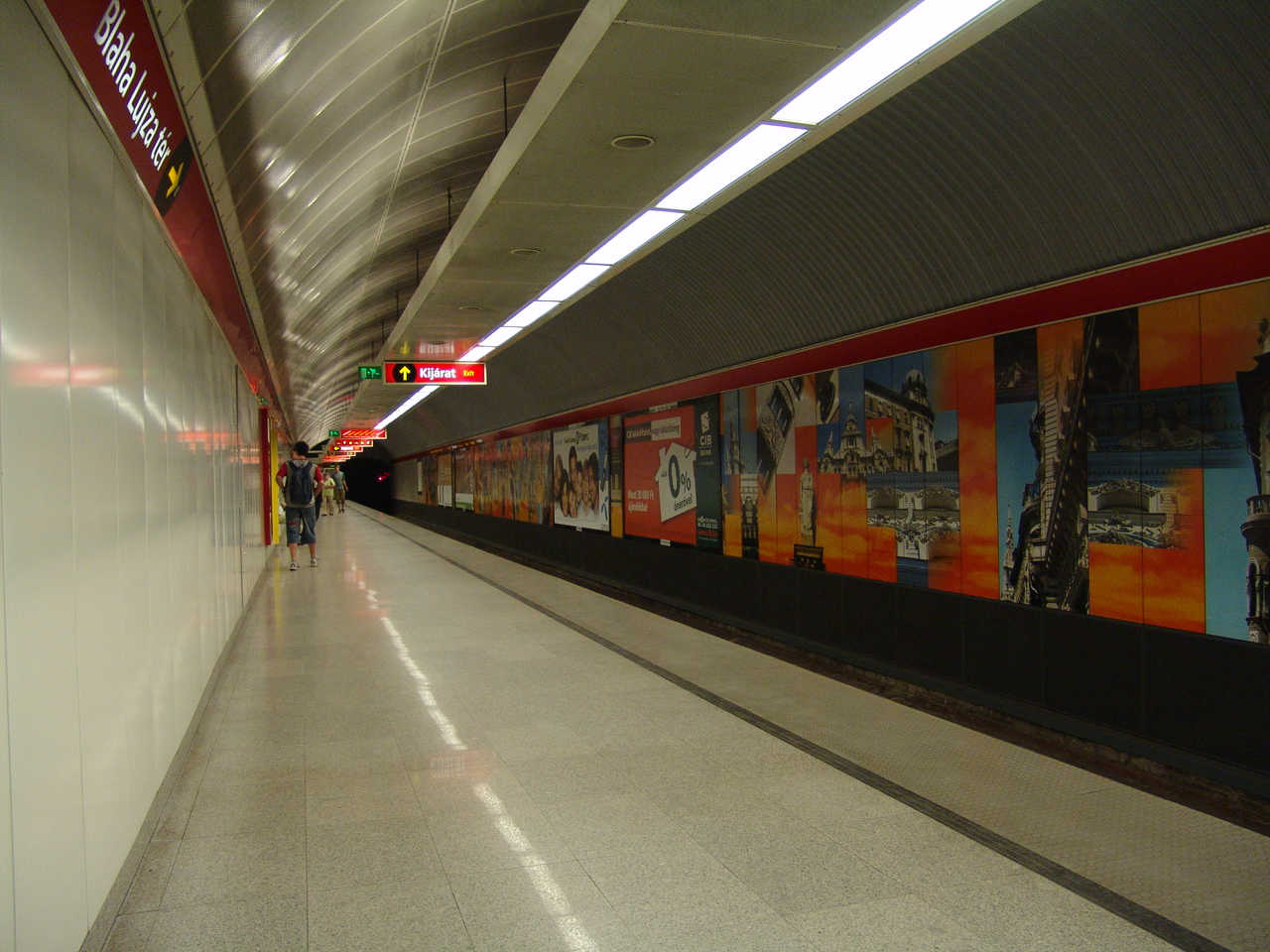
Another platform view
