= Inner City (Budapest) =

Part of Budapest, Hungary

Coordinates: 47.498°N 19.040°E

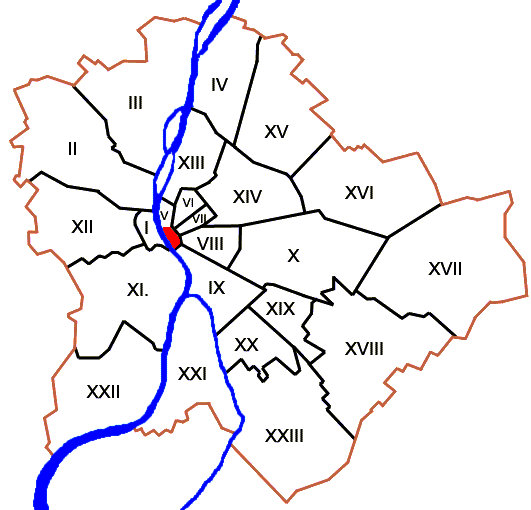
Location of the historic Inner City within Budapest

Inner City (Hungarian: Belváros; German: Innenstadt) the central part of Budapest. It is more or less equivalent with the historic old town of Pest.

== Location ==
The Inner City is situated on the east bank of the river Danube. Until 1949 it was the 4th district of the town. Since then it has largely comprised the 5th district and the 6th district. The border of the city from the east follows the line of the old city walls, which is the Small Boulevard; its sections are Károly körút (Charles Boulevard), Múzeum körút (Museum Boulevard) and Vámház körút (Vámház Boulevard). The border from the west is the river Danube itself.

A colloquial definition of inner city (or city centre, both with lower case letters) also exists according to which the city centre of Budapest, in a broader sense, is bordered by the Grand Boulevard on Pest side of the city. In Buda (if it is also included), it is bordered by the continuation of Grand Boulevard by Margit körút (Margaret Boulevard), Krisztina körút (Christina Boulevard), Budaörsi út (Budaörsi Street) and Bocskai út (Bocskai Street). So the wider area comprises the whole 5th district and some parts of the 6th, 7th, 8th, 9th, and the 13th districts on the Pest side, while also certain parts of the 1st., 2nd, 11th, and the 12th. districts on the Buda side.

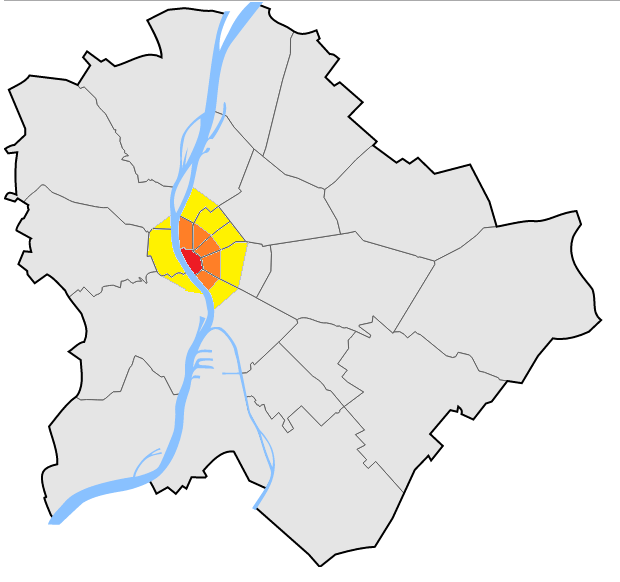
Red: official Inner City neighbourhood (old town of Pest); Orange: broader colloquial definition of inner city (inside the Nagykörút); Yellow: even broader definition.

=== Parts of the city center ===
==== The City itself ====
- The main part of 5th district (Belváros, English: Inner City) with Dunakorzó (Danube Promenade) in its heart.
- 6th district (Terézváros, English:Theresa Town)

==== The surrounding area (clockwise from north) ====
- Lipótváros (English: Leopold Town). It is the other part of the 5th district and the political-financial centre of the town.
- 7th district (Erzsébetváros, English: Elisabeth Town).
- 8th district (Józsefváros, English: Joseph Town)
- 9th district (Ferencváros, English: Francis Town)
- The inner parts of Buda.

== Landmarks ==
=== The heart of the City ===
==== Dunakorzó (Danube Promenade) ====
Dunakorzó is a long esplanade along the east bank of the river with some of monuments.

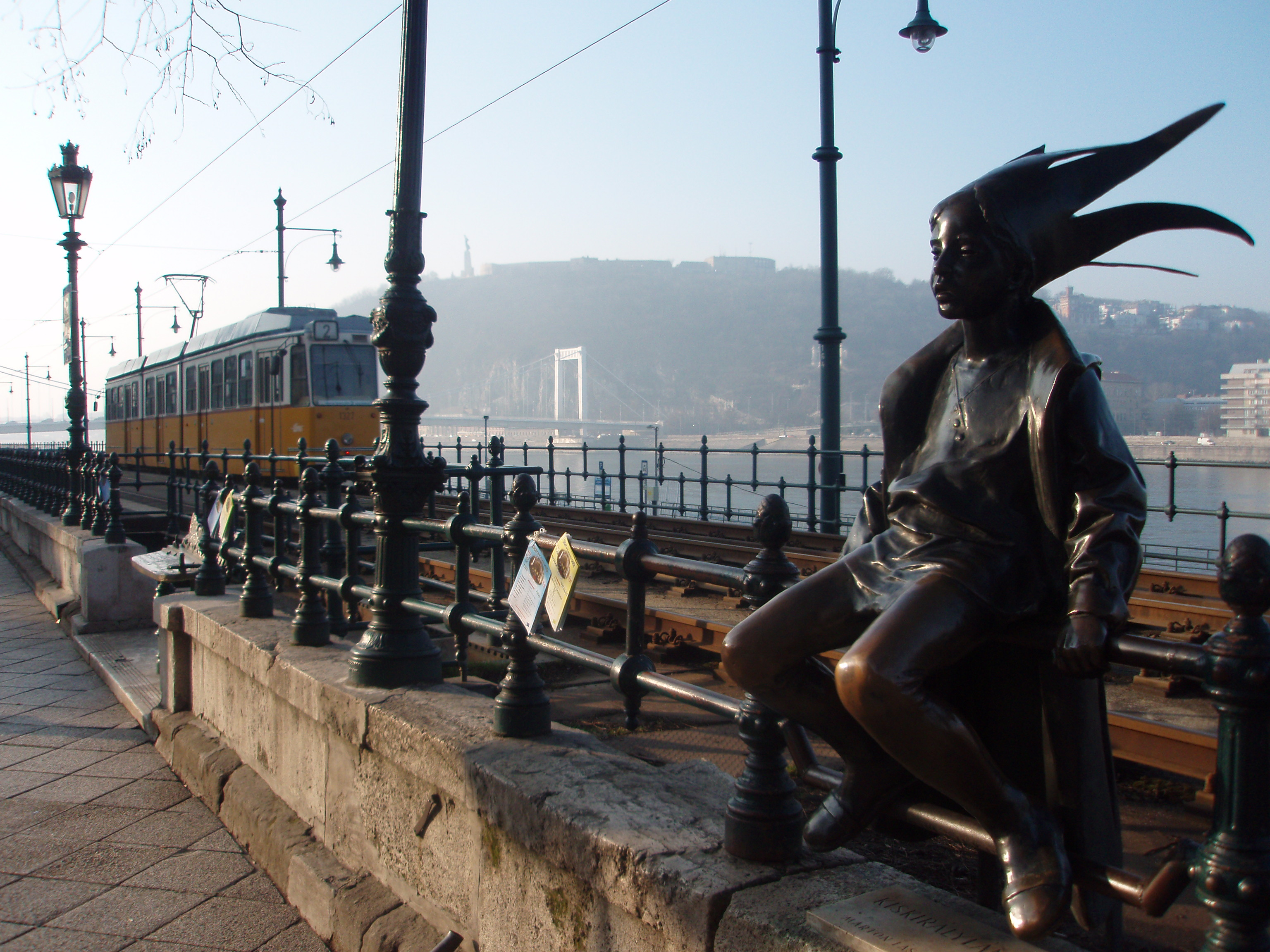

==== Belvárosi Plébániatemplom (Inner City Parish Church) ====
Belvárosi plábániatemplom is the oldest church of the town.

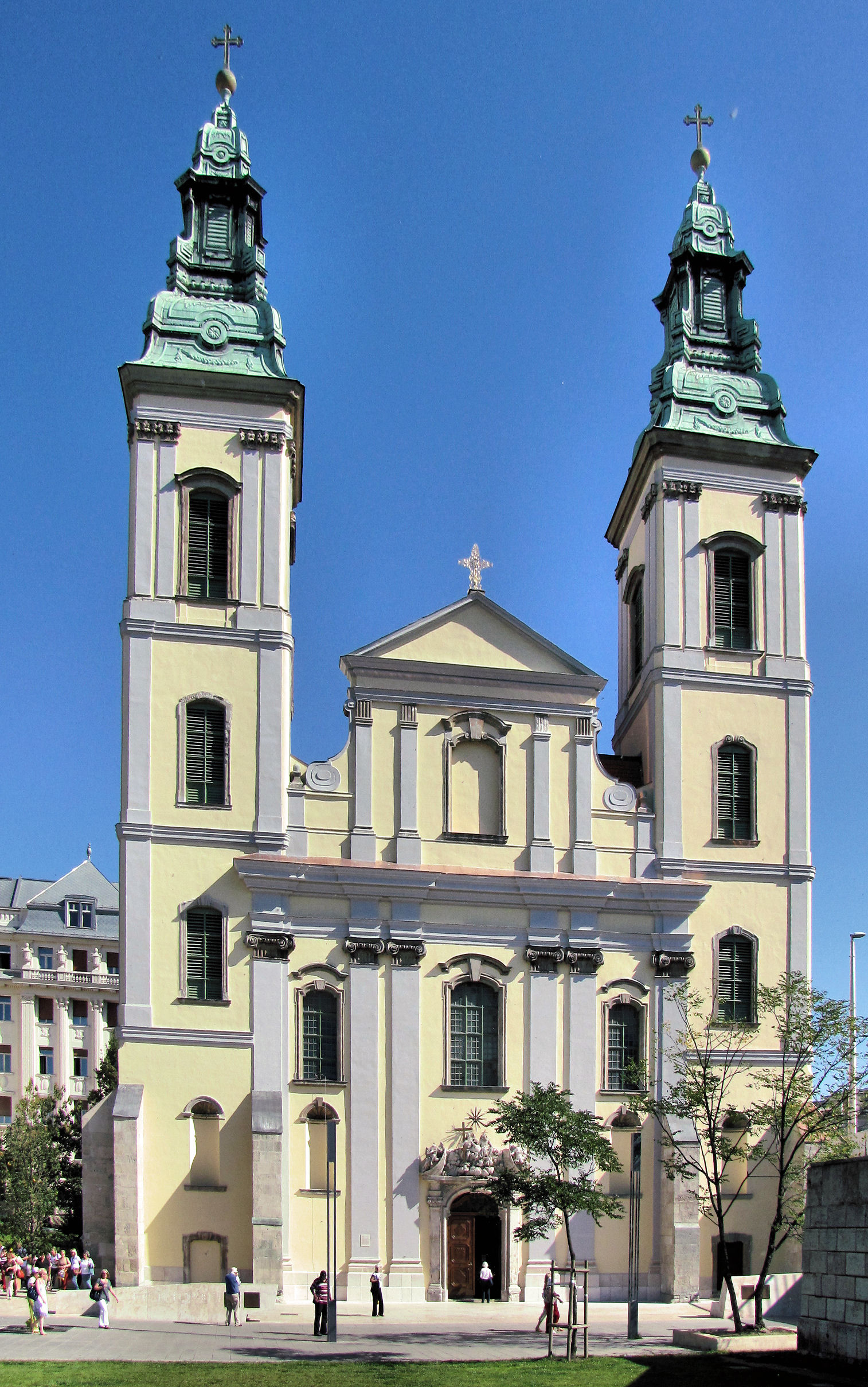

==== Egyetemi templom (University Church) ====
Egyetemi templom is a church next to ELTE university.

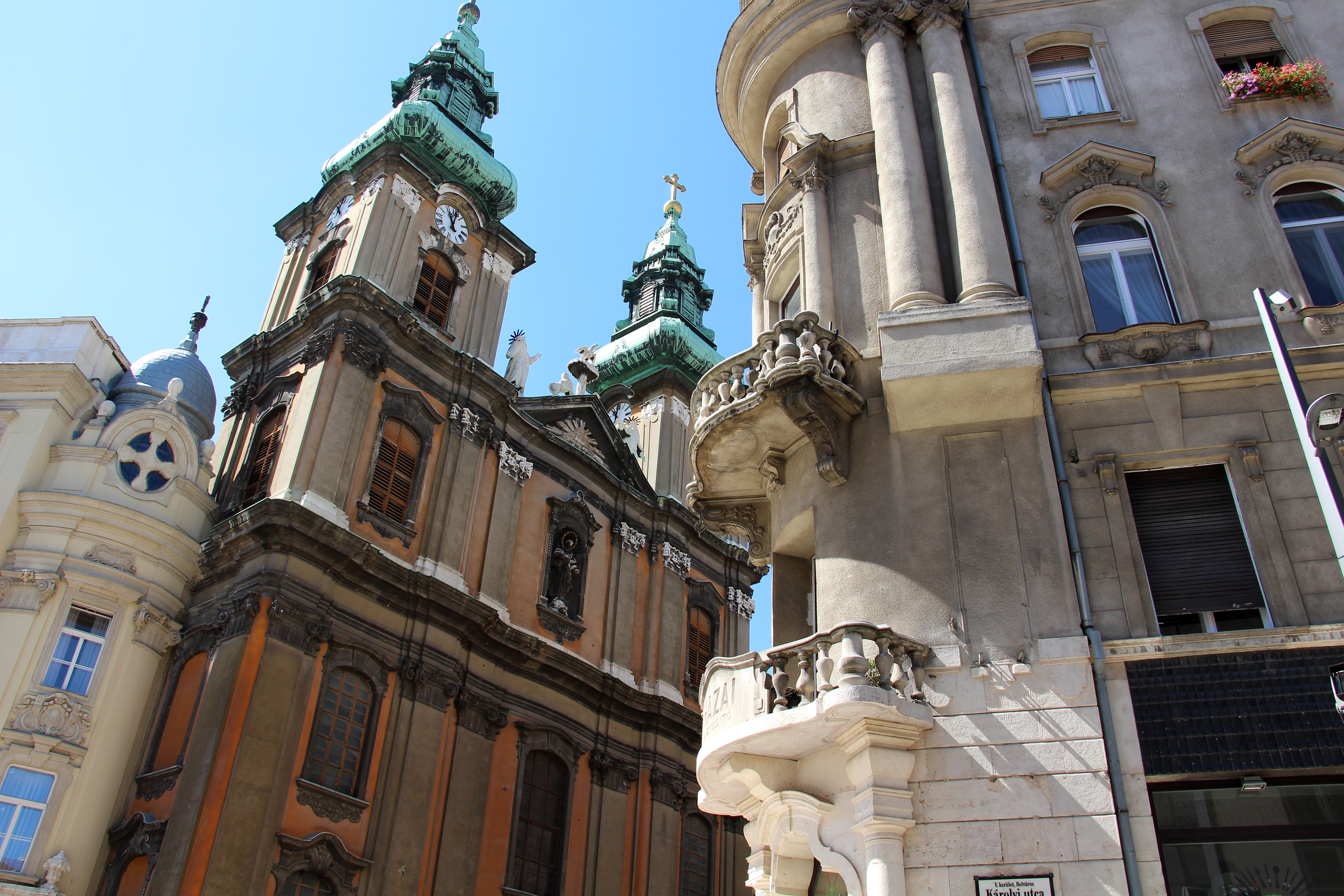

==== Deák téri evangélikus templom (Evangelical Church on Deák Square) ====
Evangelical Church on Deák Square is an old Lutheran church on Deák Ferenc tér.

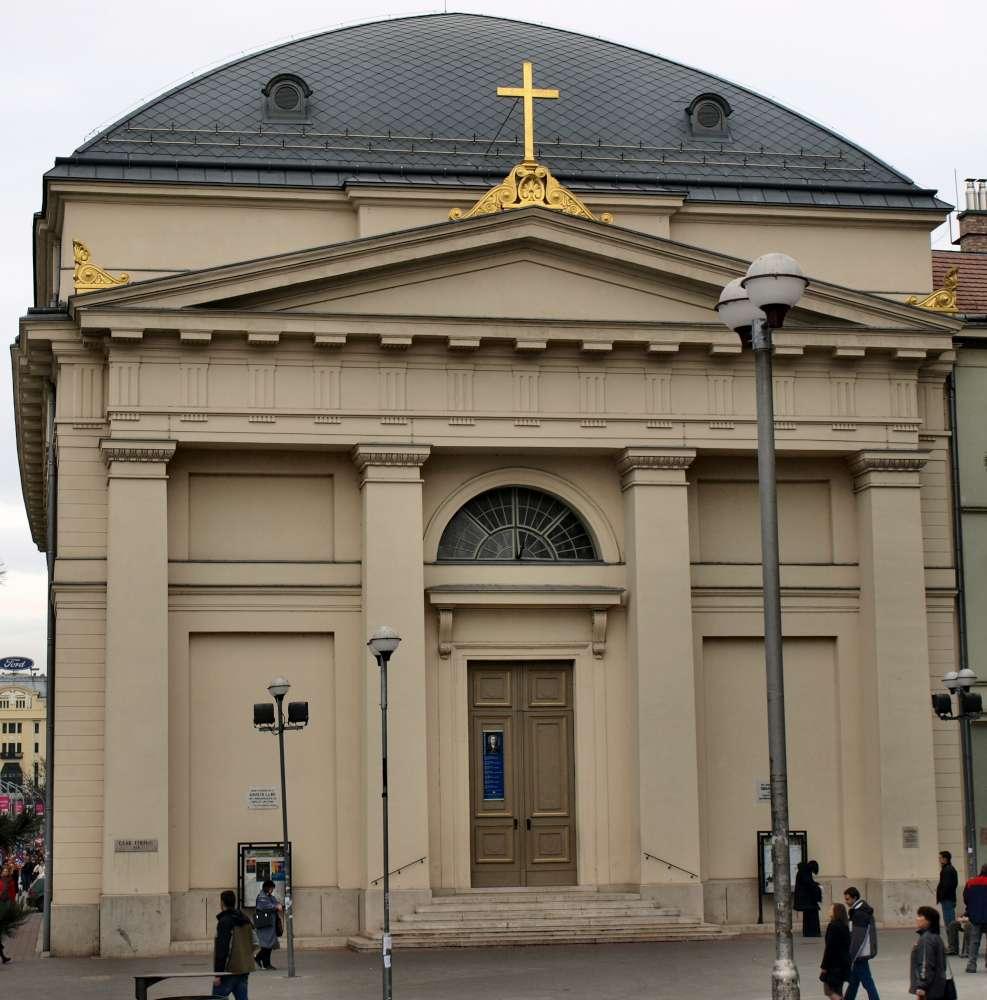

==== Pilvax kávézó (Pilvax Café) ====
Pilvax kávézó is a café with historical significance.

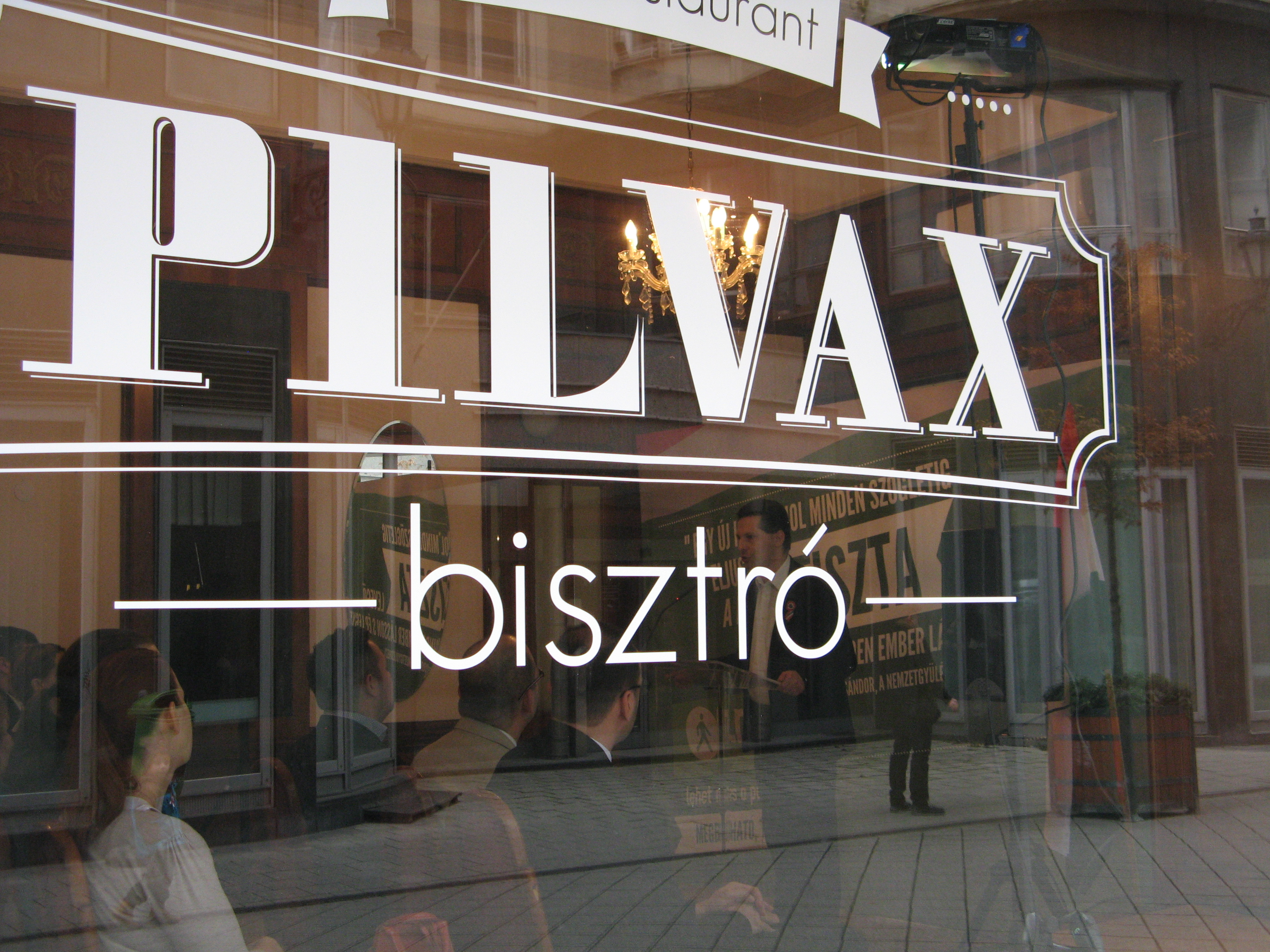

==== Váci Street (Váci Street) ====
Váci Street is the town's main shopping street full of shops, banks and also some travel agencies. Many tourists start sightseeing there.

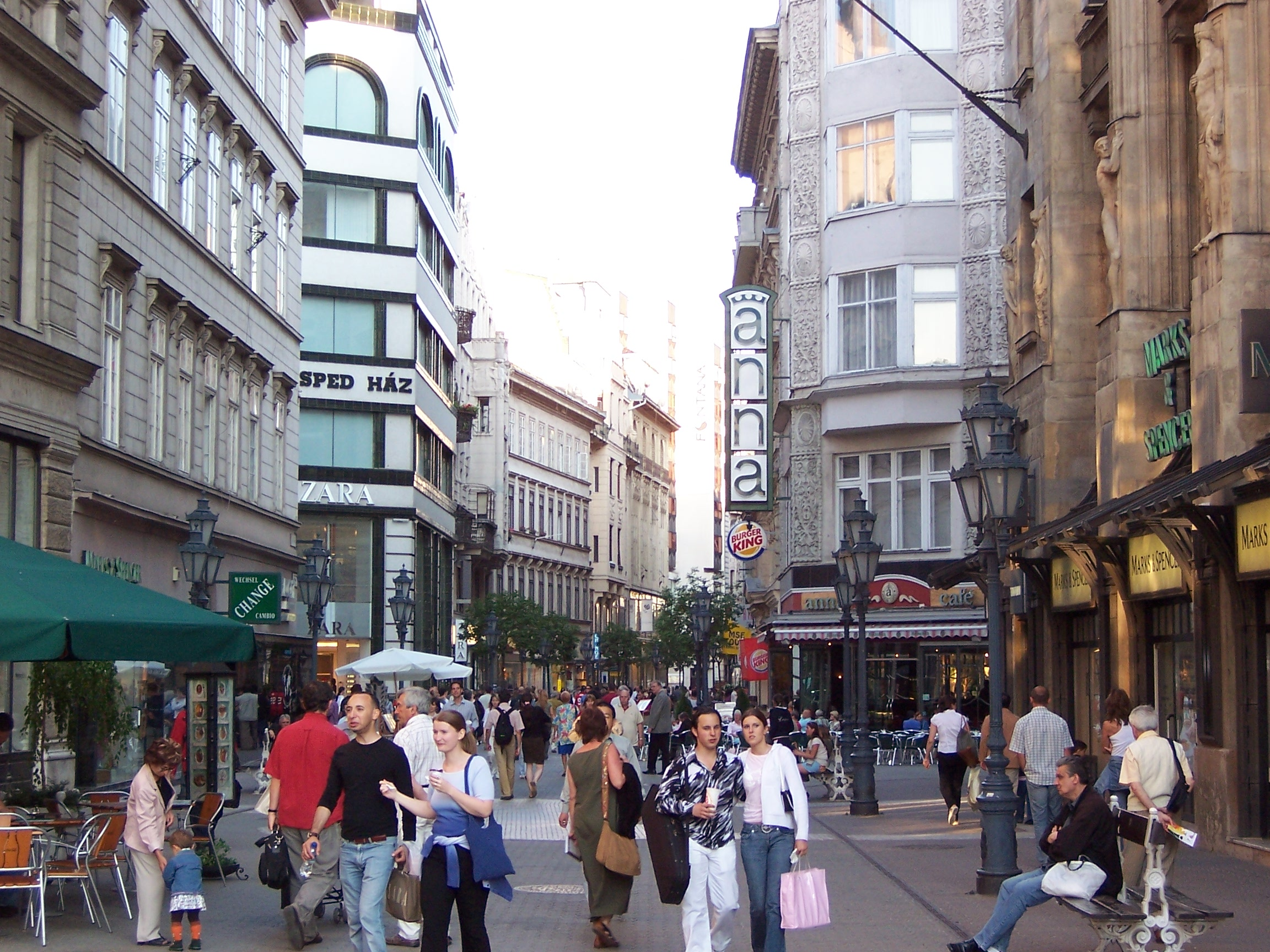

=== Farther from the Danube ===
==== Parliament building ====
The Parliament building is the largest one in Hungary and serves as the center of the Hungarian lawmaking.

==== Szabadság Square ====
Szabadság Square is in the center of the town surrounded by monuments and historic buildings.

==== Opera House ====
Hungarian State Opera House is one of the most precious historic buildings of the town hosting the Hungarian State Opera.

==== Ballet Institute ====
The building was the host of the Hungarian ballet.

=== Monuments in Buda ===
==== Várhegy (with Buda Castle) ====
Várhegy contains the Buda Castle and a lot of historic buildings around it.

== Transport ==
The three Budapest Metro lines converge at Ferenc Deák Square where the Blue and Red lines meet the Millennium Underground Railway (yellow). There are several bus, tram and trolleybus lines in this area.

== See also ==
- List of districts in Budapest
