= Small Boulevard (Budapest) =

Street in Budapest, Hungary

Coordinates: 47.4911°N 19.0628°E

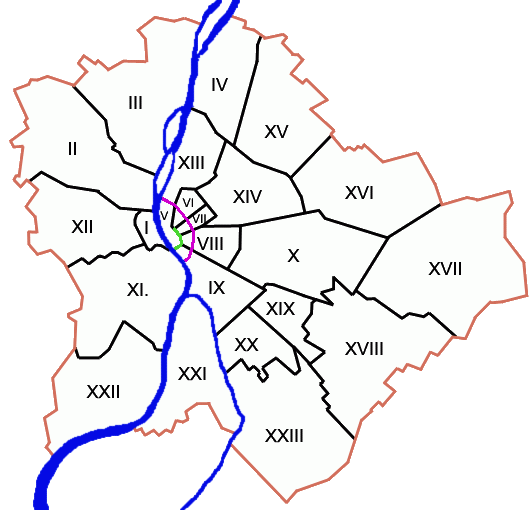
Grand and Small Boulevards of Budapest

Kiskörút or Small Boulevard (lit. "Small Ring Road") is a major thoroughfare in Budapest. It forms an incomplete semicircle between Deák Square and Fővám Square. It is the border of the southern part of District 5 (cf. Belváros), the innermost district of Pest. As opposed to Nagykörút, it only touches the Danube at its southern end.

== Meaning ==
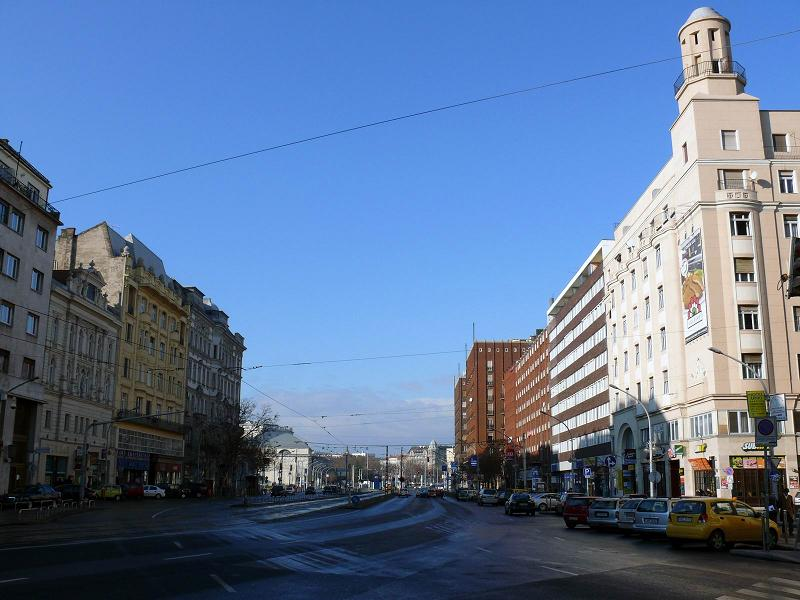
View of the Károly körút part (before the 2010/11 renovation), from the crossing of Károly körút–Dohány street (utca), just a few steps from Europe's biggest and the world's second largest synagogue, the Dohány Street Synagogue

Kiskörút is actually a colloquial name for three parts which connect to each other: (from north to south) Károly körút, Múzeum körút, and Vámház körút; these are the names a traveller will find on the map and the buildings.

== Location ==
It consists of a 1.5-kilometre-long (0.93 mi) road with a tram line in the middle. Its width is around 55 m in the north and it narrows down to 27 m in the south. Its starting point is Deák Ferenc tér in the north, it crosses Astoria and Kálvin tér, both basic points of reference for the locals, and it ends up at Fővám tér, a square next to Liberty Bridge. Among the major roads, it crosses Rákóczi út at Astoria and Üllői út at Kálvin tér. Deák Ferenc tér is the meeting point of the three existing metro lines, and Metro 2 and 3 both have a further station as well at Astoria and Kálvin tér. The newer Metro 4 has stations at Fővám tér and Kálvin tér.

== History ==
Vámház körút (literally "Customs House Boulevard") began with a German name, Fleischhacker Gass, in the 1780s, which was Magyarized to Mészáros utca ("Butcher's Street") in the 19th century. When the Budapest's central customs house was built (at what is now Fővám tér) in 1875, the road's name was changed accordingly.

From the 18th century, the sections of road known today as Múzeum körút and Károly körút were (together with today's Bajcsy-Zsilinszky út) known by a single German name Land Strasse later translated as Országút. In 1874, Budapest's Public Works Council decided to divide that road, creating the Kiskörút in three sections. The Múzeum körút was named for the Hungarian National Museum, which opened in 1847, and Károly körút was named in honour of Charles IV of Hungary and the barracks that bore his name alongside the road. From that point on, Vámház körút was also considered part of the same boulevard, and Bajcsy-Zsilinszky út was split off.

=== 20th-century name changes ===
In 1915, Vámház körút was renamed to Ferdinánd körút in honour of Ferdinand I of Bulgaria. Its name was restored to Vámház körút in 1919, but the street was renamed again, taking the name of István Horthy after his death in 1942. In 1945, the street took the name of Soviet military commander Fyodor Tolbukhin until after the system change.

Between 1915 and 1918, Múzeum körút was renamed to honour Hungary's World War I ally, Ottoman Sultan Mehmed V.

In 1918, Károly körút was briefly renamed Népakarat körút ("People's Will Boulevard"), then Népkörút ("People's Boulevard") before its name was restored in 1926. In 1945, it was renamed to honour Béla Somogyi (a Népszava editor murdered during the White Terror in 1920) and in 1953, it was further renamed Tanács körút ("Council Boulevard"). Its name was again restored in 1991.

== Features, notable spots ==
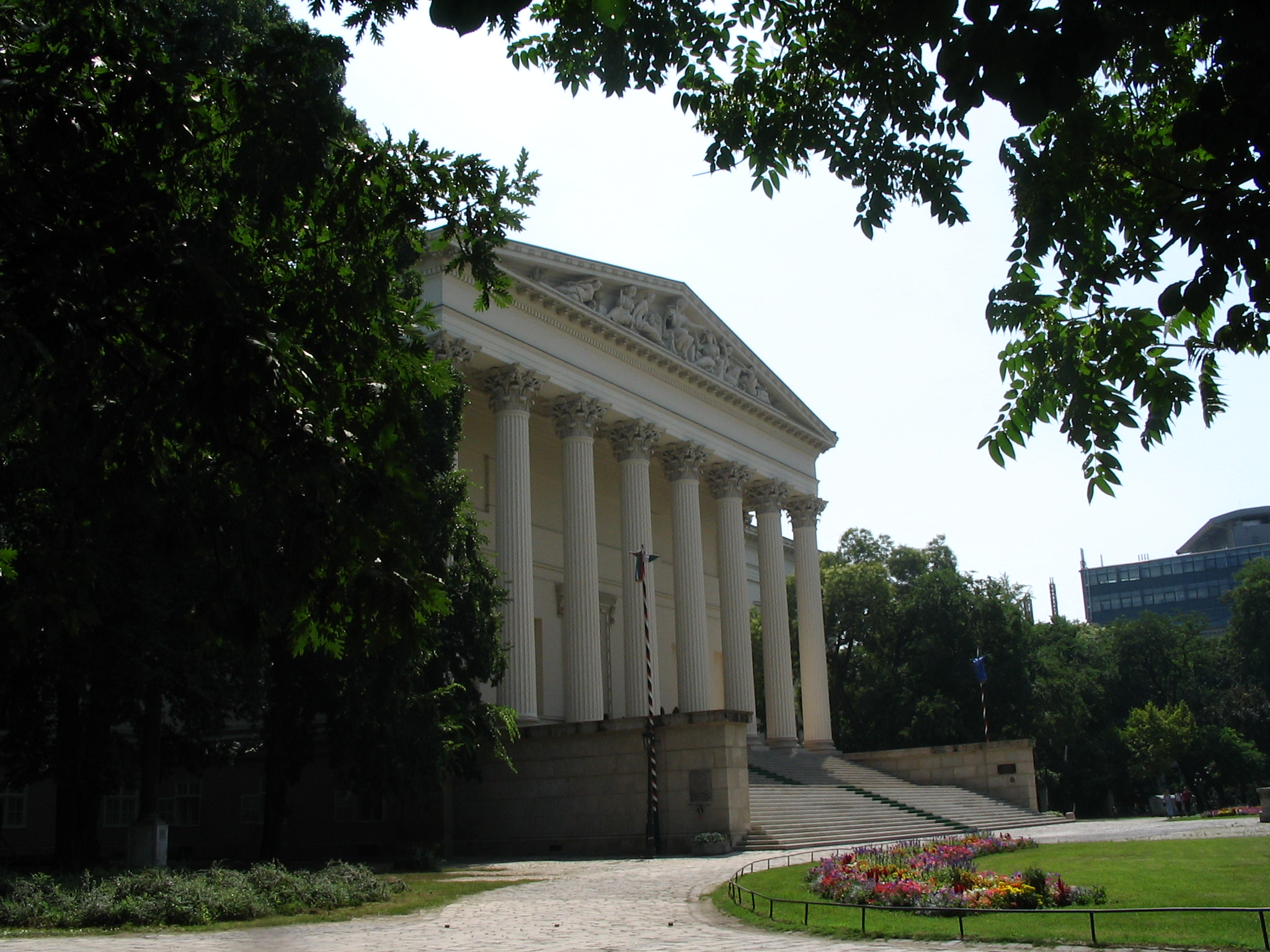
The Hungarian National Museum at the Múzeum körút part

The main sights of Kiskörút are the Dohány Street Synagogue (Romantic, 1859), the second largest such building in the world (after the one in New York) with the Jewish Museum and the Holocaust Memorial, the Hungarian National Museum (Classicistic, 1847), and the Grand Market Hall (Nagyvásárcsarnok, Neo-gothic, 1896). The Synagogue can be found in a recess near Astoria.

There are two major universities along Kiskörút: the Arts Faculty of Eötvös Loránd University (1883), and the former University of Economics, today Corvinus University of Budapest (Neo-Renaissance, 1874). Along Kiskörút, remnants of the old City Wall can still be seen (e.g. at Ferenczy István utca corner), although most are already hidden in the courtyards of residential buildings.

== See also ==
- Grand Boulevard
- Belváros
