= Danubius Hotel Astoria =

Hotel in Budapest, Hungary

Coordinates: 47.4941°N 19.0599°E

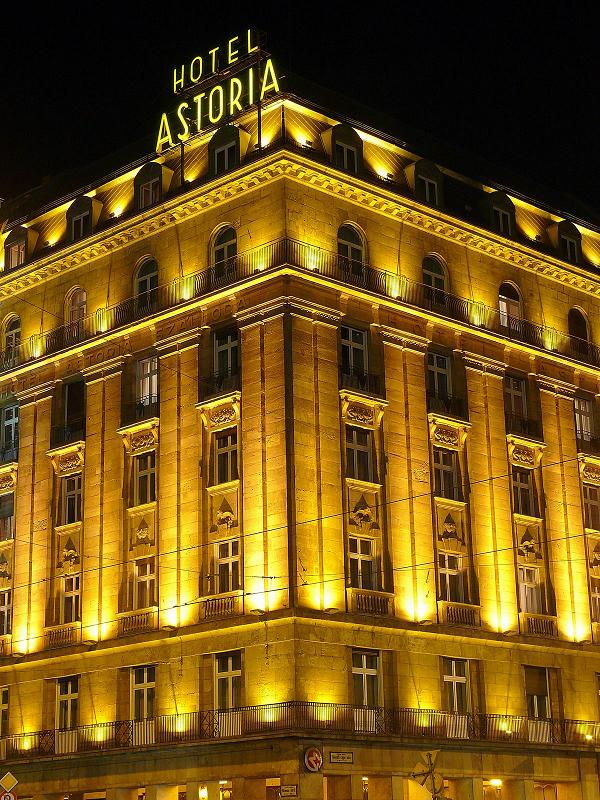
Hotel Astoria

Danubius Hotel Astoria is a four-star hotel in the centre of Budapest, which opened on 14 March 1914. It has 138 rooms, including three suites. The hotel served as the headquarters of the Hungarian National Council during the stormy days of October 1918.

The hotel is managed by the Danubius Hotels Group as a member of its Classic Collection brand. It is located on the corner of Kossuth Lajos utca and Múzeum körút; the intersection is also named after the hotel. Some interior scenes from the film Being Julia were shot in the hotel.
