= Bajza utca metro station =

Budapest metro station

Bajza utca
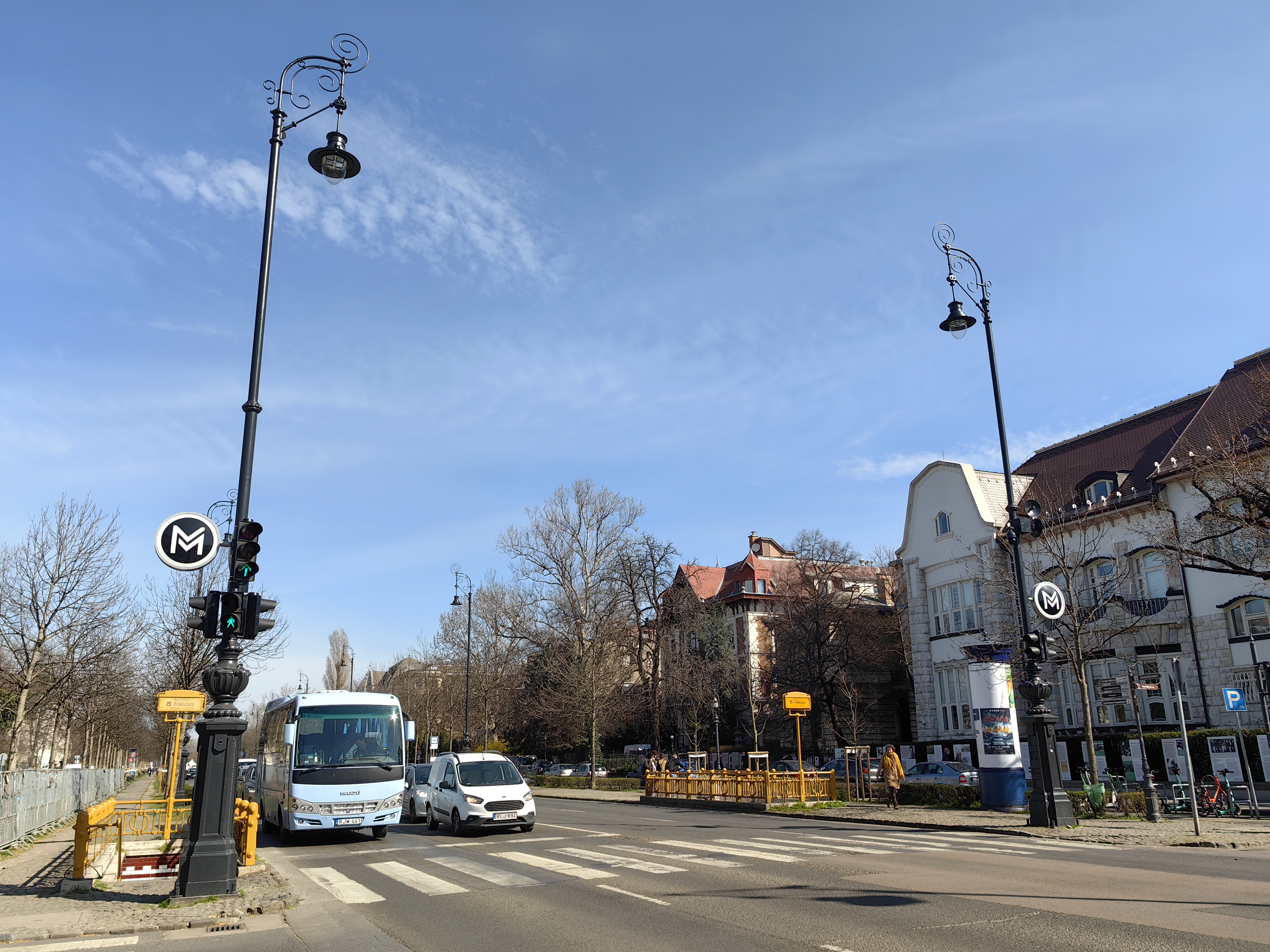
- Station entrances from Andrássy Avenue

General information
- Location: Bajza street, Budapest; Hungary
- Coordinates: 47°30′40″N 19°04′20″E
- System: Budapest Metro station
- Platforms: 2 side platforms

Construction
- Structure type: cut-and-cover underground

History
- Opened: 2 May 1896

Services
Preceding station	Budapest Metro	Following station
Kodály körönd towards Vörösmarty tér	Line 1	Hősök tere towards Mexikói út
Location

Bajza utca is a station of the yellow M1 (Millennium Underground) line of the Budapest Metro. It is located under Andrássy Avenue beneath to its intersection with Bajza street.

The station was opened on 2 May 1896 as part of the inaugural section of the Budapest Metro, between Vörösmarty tér and Széchenyi fürdő. This section, known as the Millennium Underground Railway, was the first metro system in continental Europe. In 2002, it was included into the World Heritage Site "Budapest, including the Banks of the Danube, the Buda Castle Quarter and Andrássy Avenue".

The station has two side platforms, each with its own access from the street.

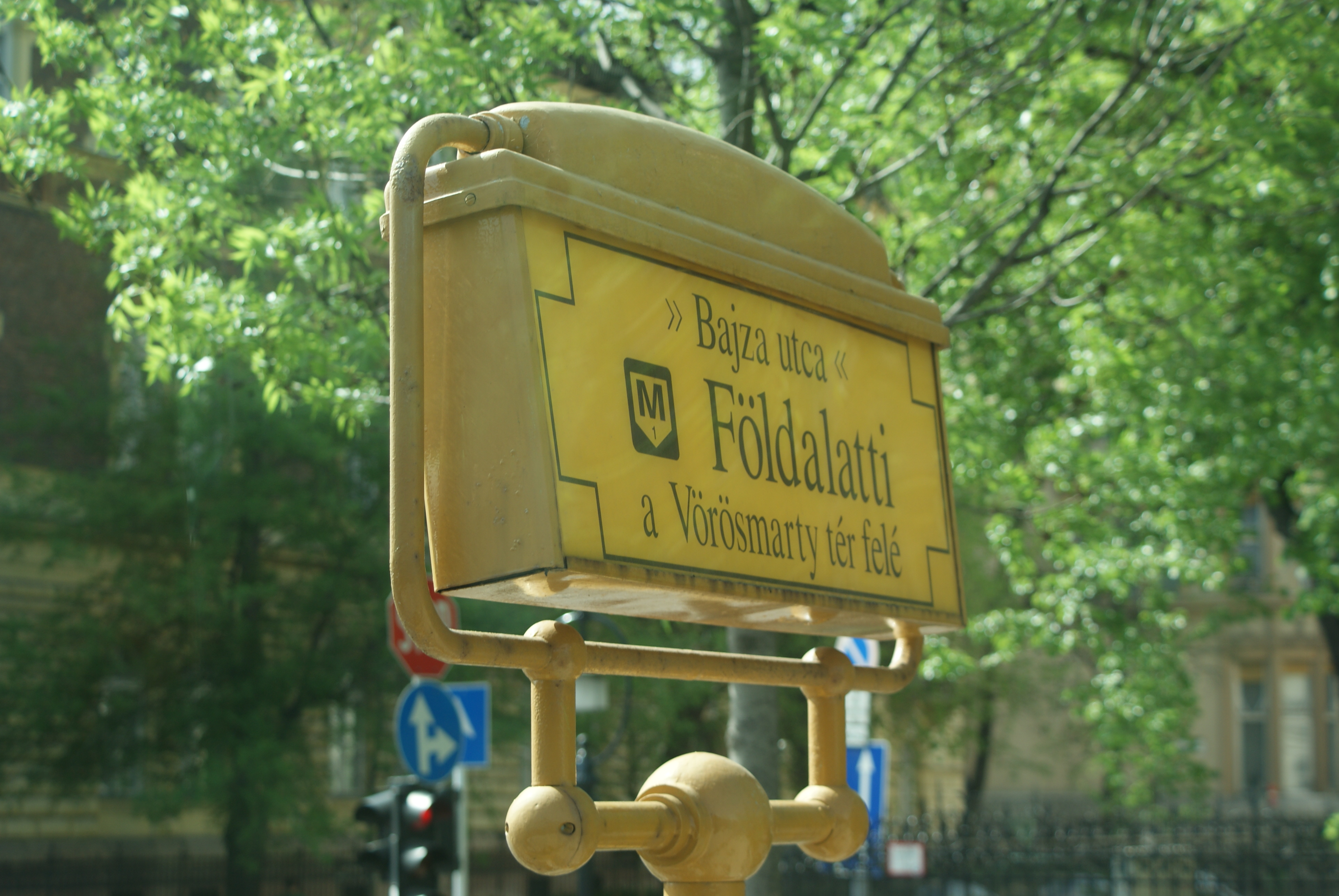
Sign at entrance to westbound platform

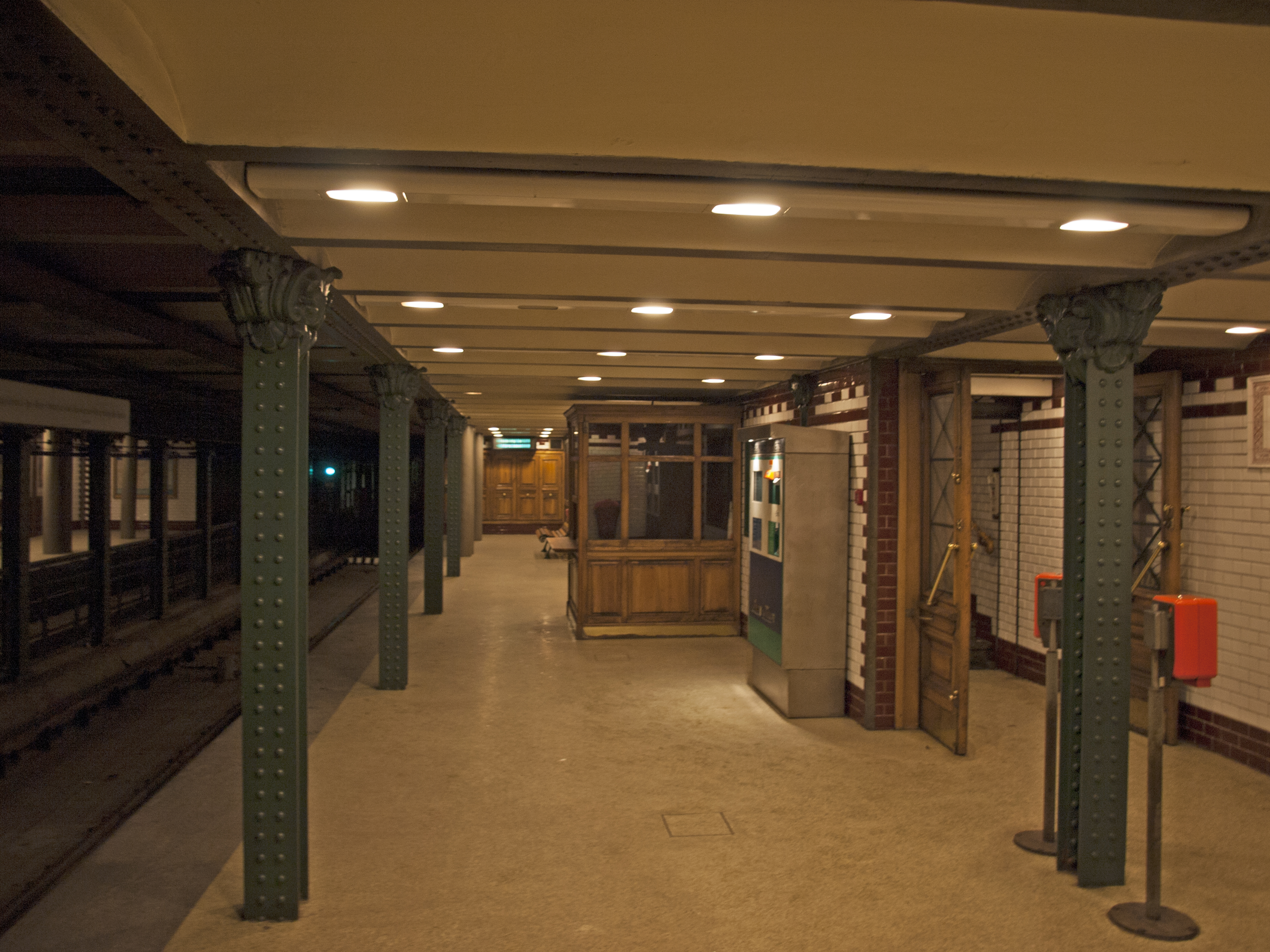
Platform and office

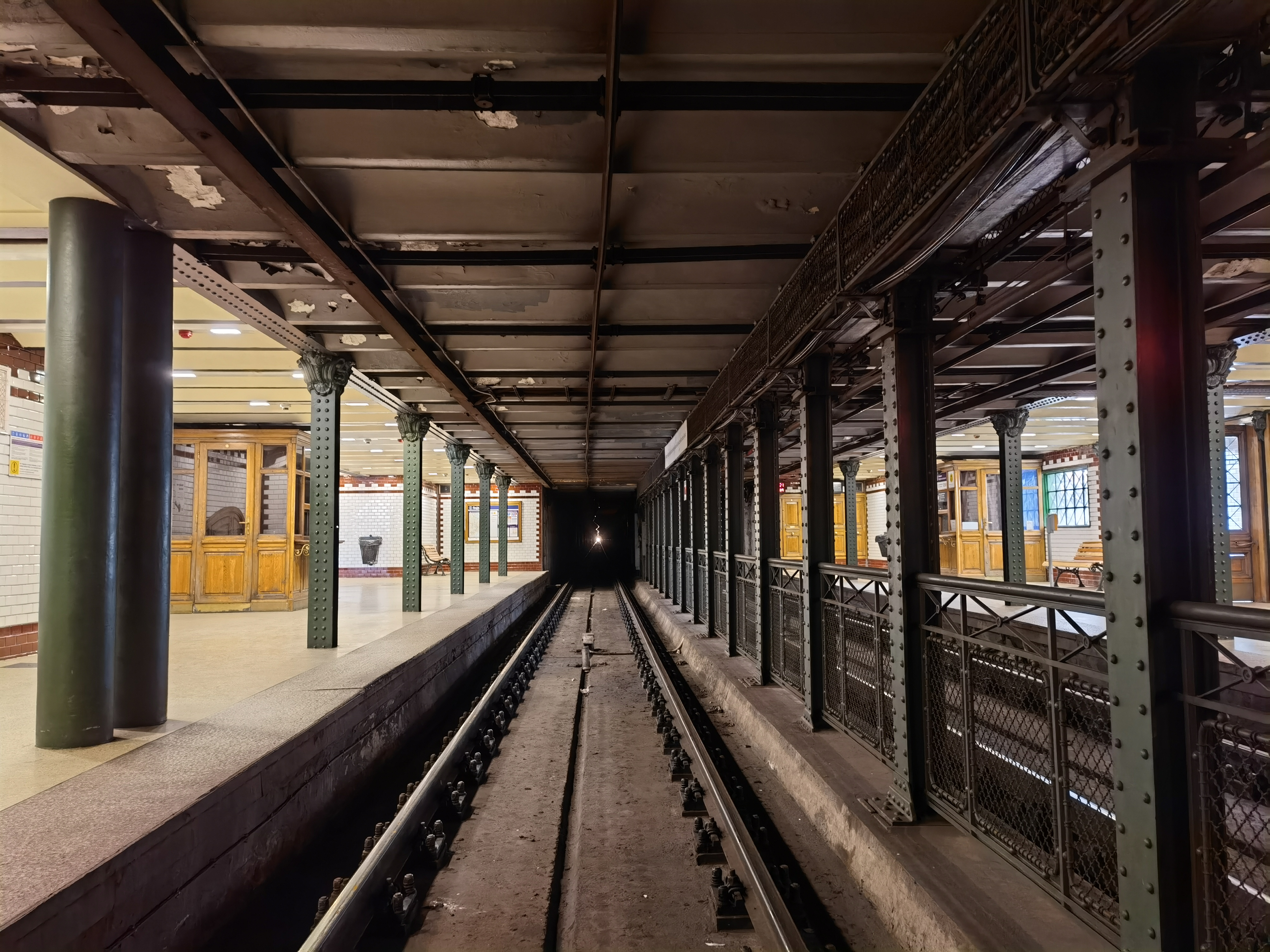
View through the station

== Connection ==
- Bus: 105, 210, 210B
