= Vörösmarty utca metro station =

Budapest metro station

Vörösmarty utca
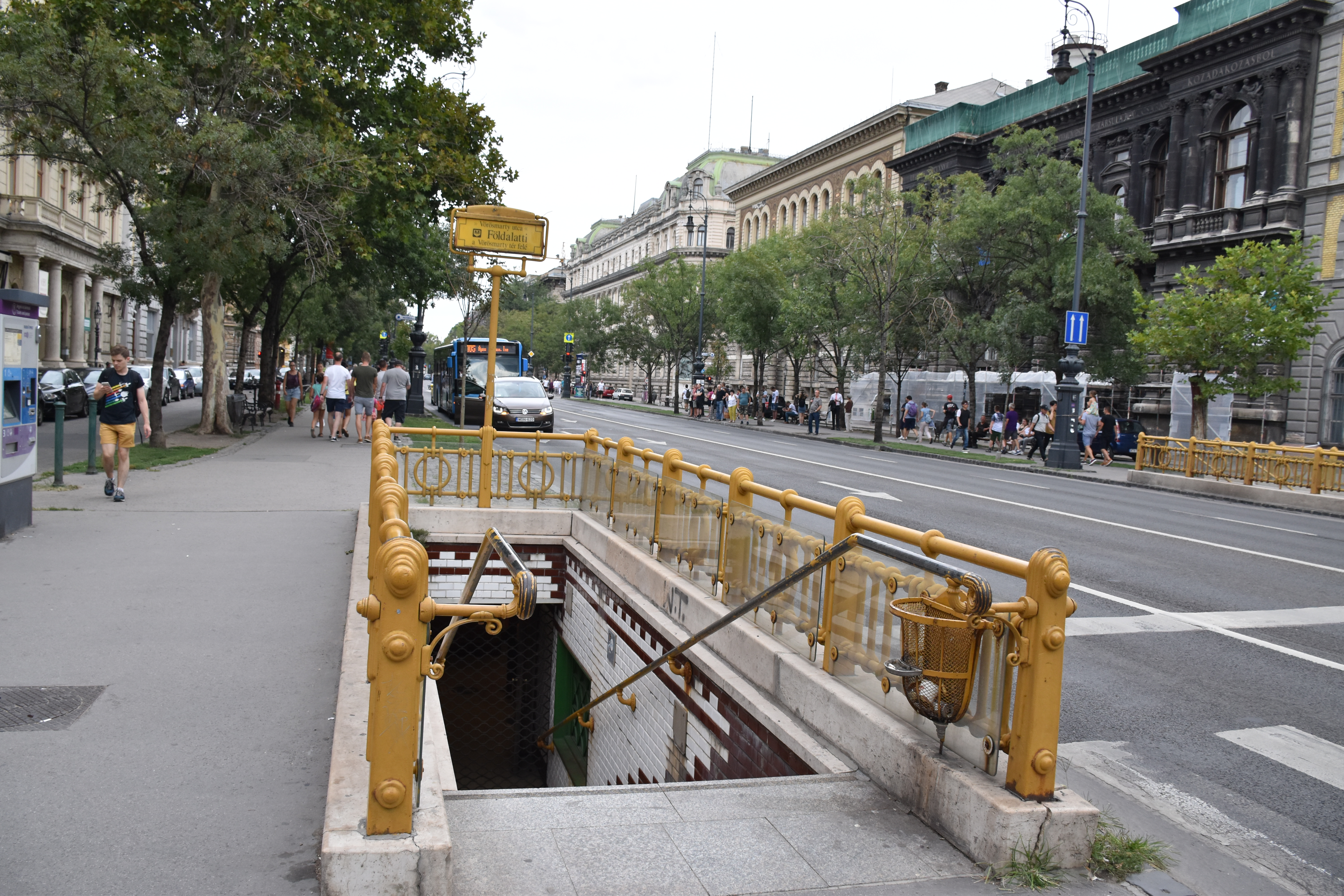
- Entrance to Vörösmarty utca metro station

General information
- Location: Vörösmarty St, Budapest; Hungary
- Coordinates: 47°30′25″N 19°03′57″E
- System: Budapest Metro station
- Platforms: 2 side platforms

Construction
- Structure type: cut-and-cover underground

History
- Opened: 2 May 1896

Services
Preceding station	Budapest Metro	Following station
Oktogon towards Vörösmarty tér	Line 1	Kodály körönd towards Mexikói út
Location

Vörösmarty utca is a station of the yellow M1 (Millennium Underground) line of the Budapest Metro. It is located under Andrássy Avenue near to its intersection with Vörösmarty utca. The street and station take their name from the poet and dramatist Mihály Vörösmarty.

It was opened on 2 May 1896 as part of the inaugural section of the Budapest Metro, between Vörösmarty tér and Széchenyi fürdő. This section, known as the Millennium Underground Railway, was the first metro system in continental Europe. In 2002, it was included into the World Heritage Site "Budapest, including the Banks of the Danube, the Buda Castle Quarter and Andrássy Avenue".

The station has two side platforms, each with its own independent access from the street.

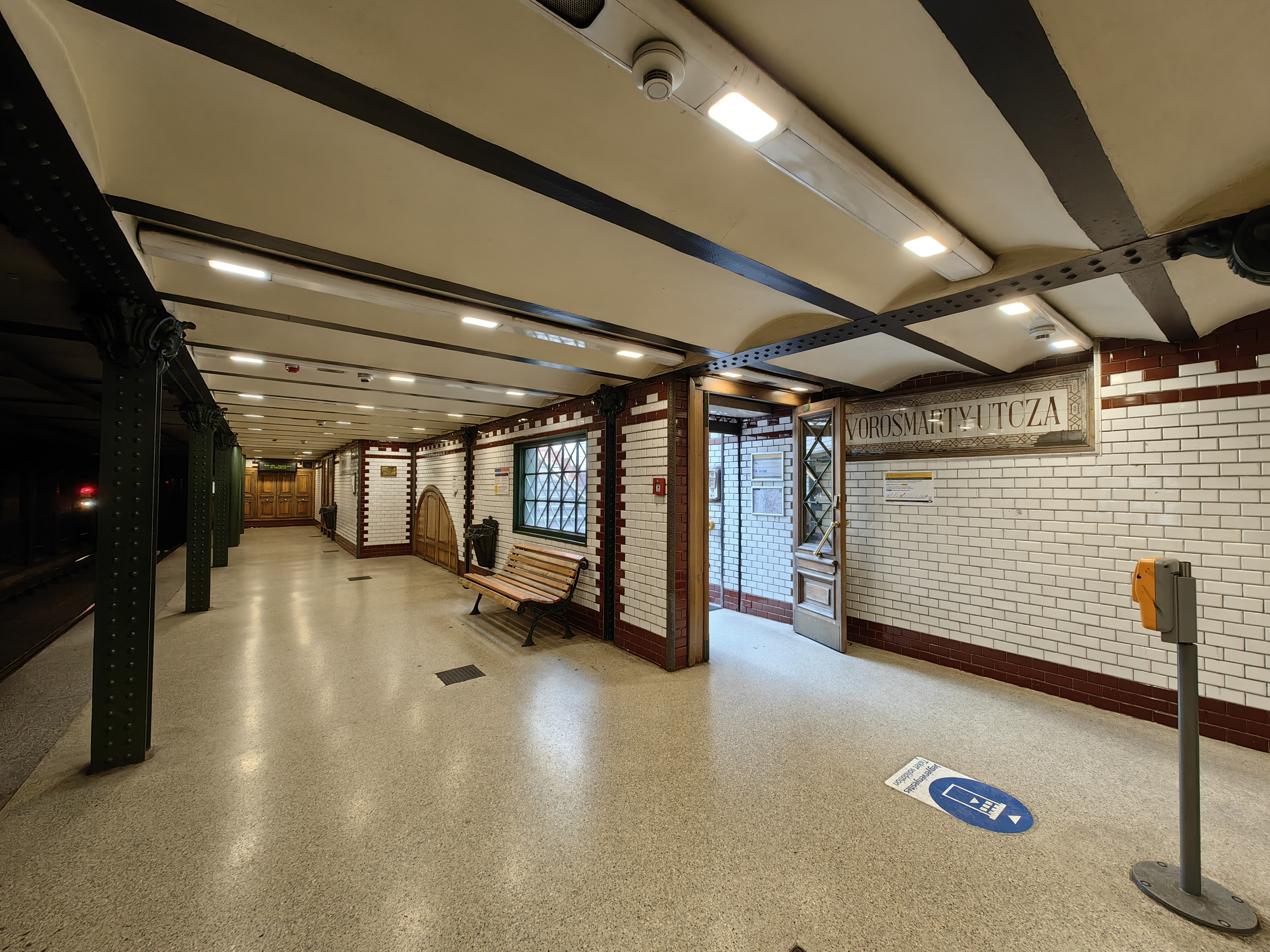
Entrance and platform

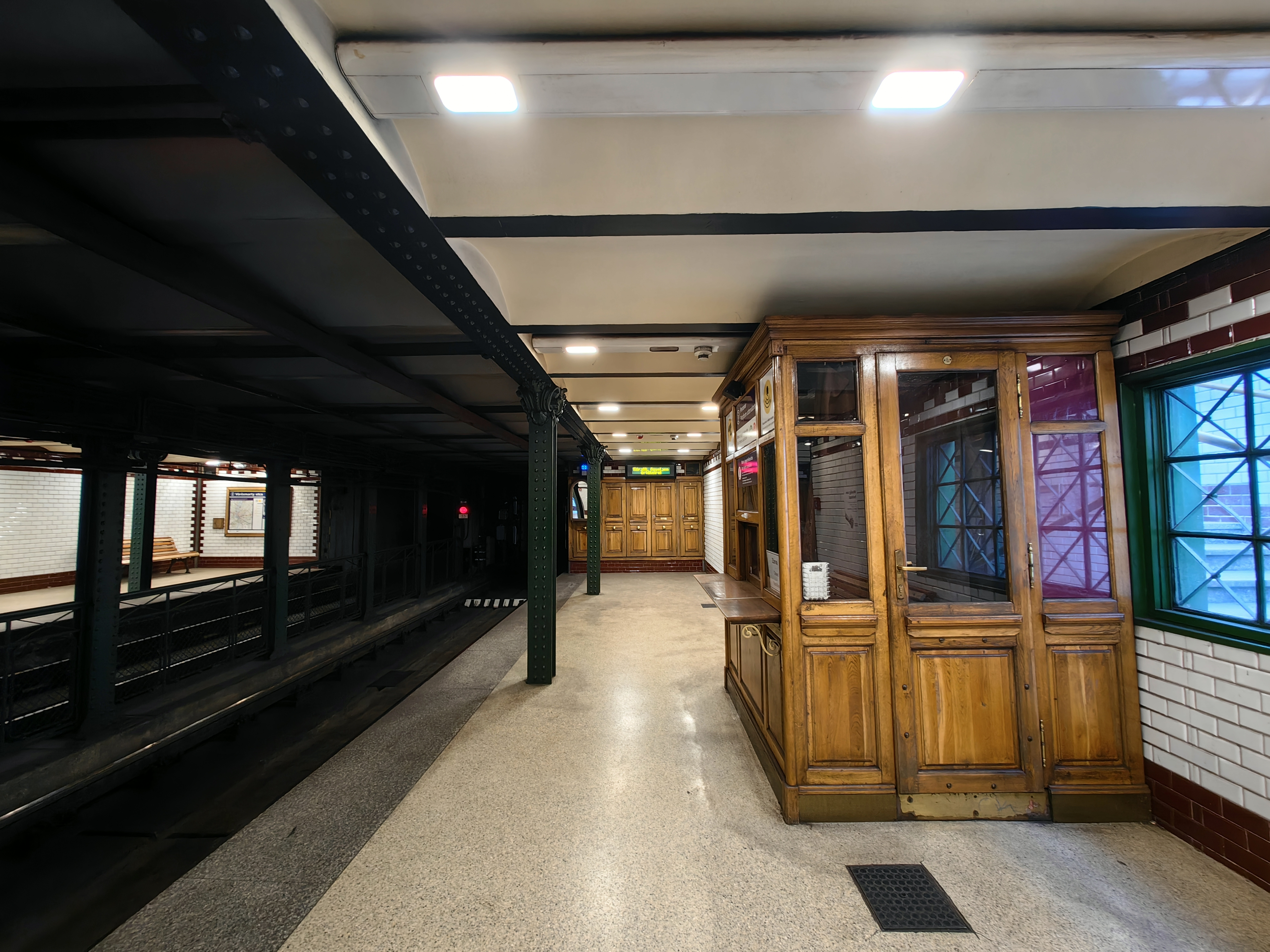
Platform and office

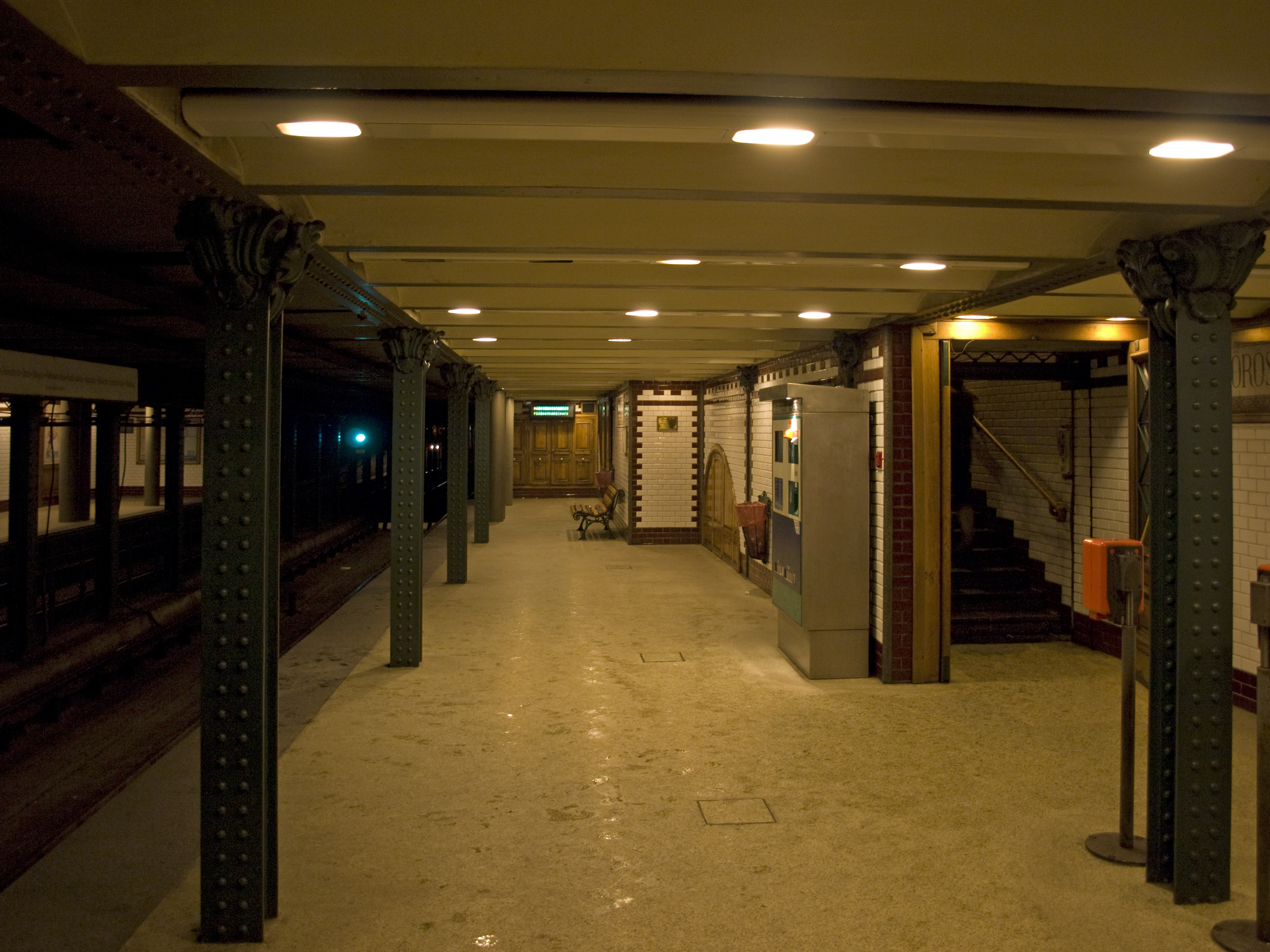
Platform

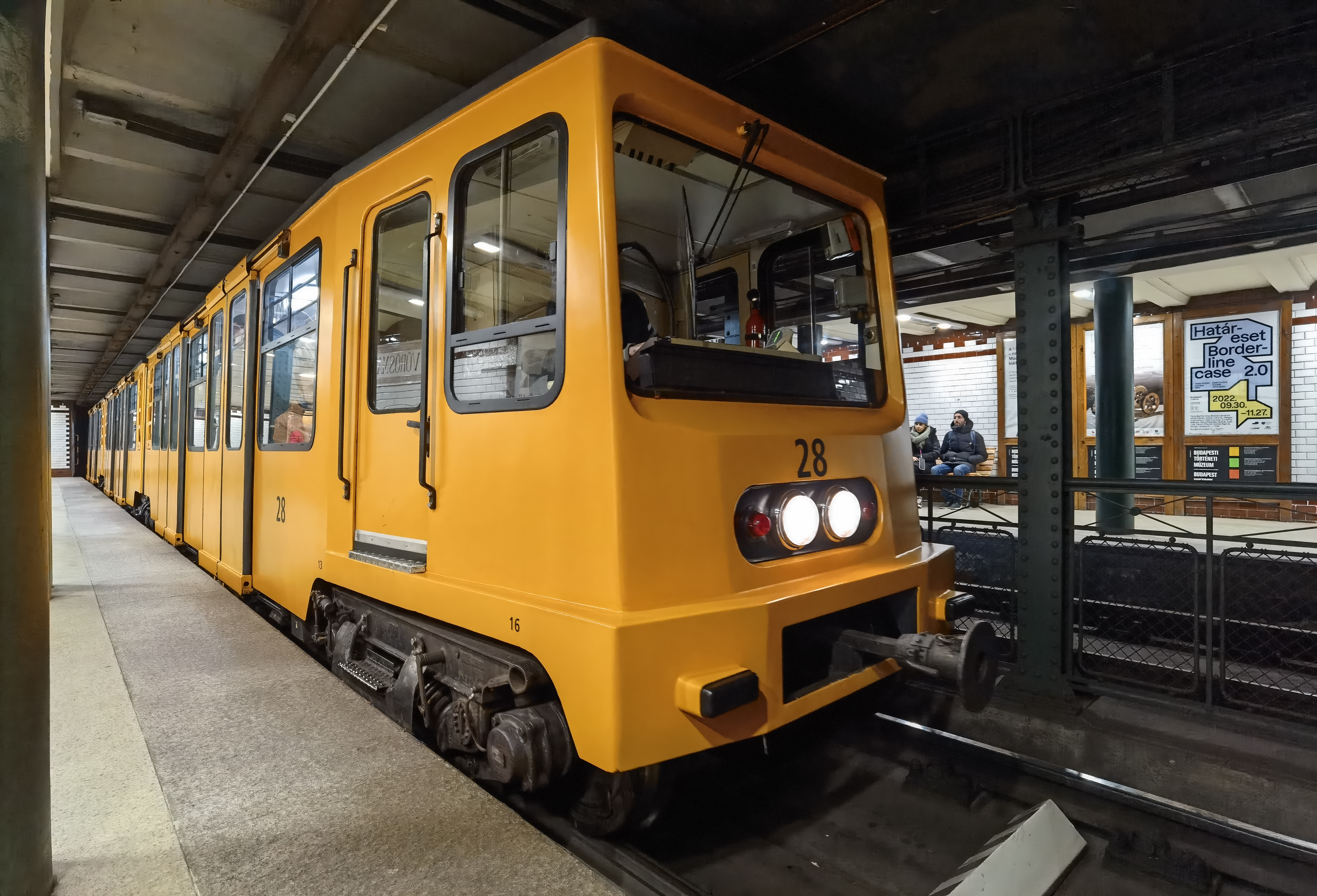
Train in the station

== Connections ==
- Bus: 105, 210, 210B
- Trolleybus: 73, 76
