= Kodály körönd metro station =

Budapest metro station

Kodály körönd
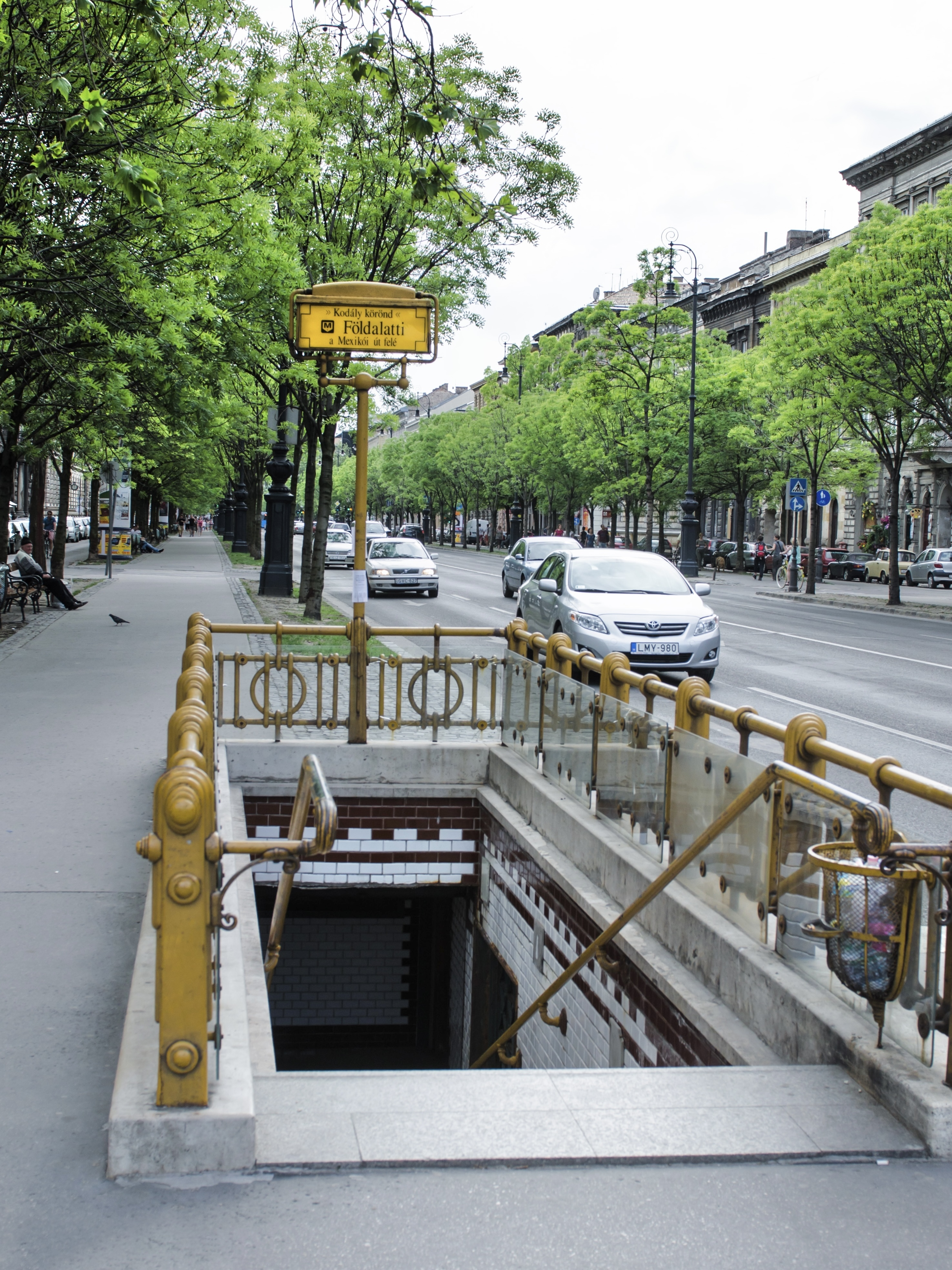
- Station entrance

General information
- Location: Kodály körönd, Budapest; Hungary
- Coordinates: 47°30′34″N 19°04′12″E
- System: Budapest Metro station
- Platforms: 2 side platforms

Construction
- Structure type: cut-and-cover underground

History
- Opened: 2 May 1896

Services
Preceding station	Budapest Metro	Following station
Vörösmarty utca towards Vörösmarty tér	Line 1	Bajza utca towards Mexikói út
Location

Kodály körönd is a station of the yellow M1 (Millennium Underground) line of the Budapest Metro, under Kodály circus on Andrássy Avenue. Like the circus, the metro station takes its name from Zoltán Kodály who once lived in one of the buildings on the circus.

The station was opened on 2 May 1896 as part of the inaugural section of the Budapest Metro, between Vörösmarty tér and Széchenyi fürdő. This section, known as the Millennium Underground Railway, was the first metro system in continental Europe. In 2002, it was included into the World Heritage Site "Budapest, including the Banks of the Danube, the Buda Castle Quarter and Andrássy Avenue".

The station has two side platforms, each with its own access from the street.

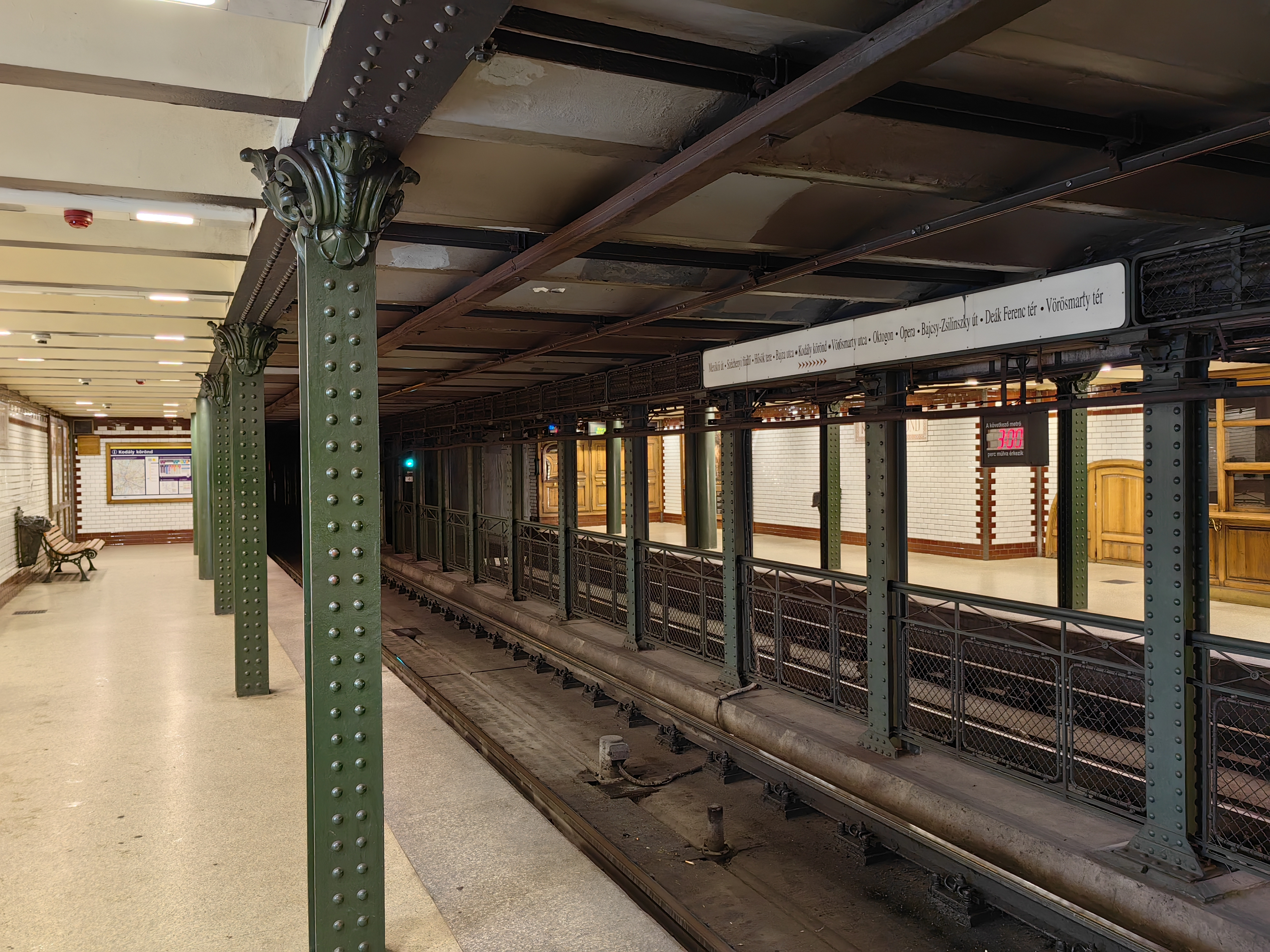
Station platforms

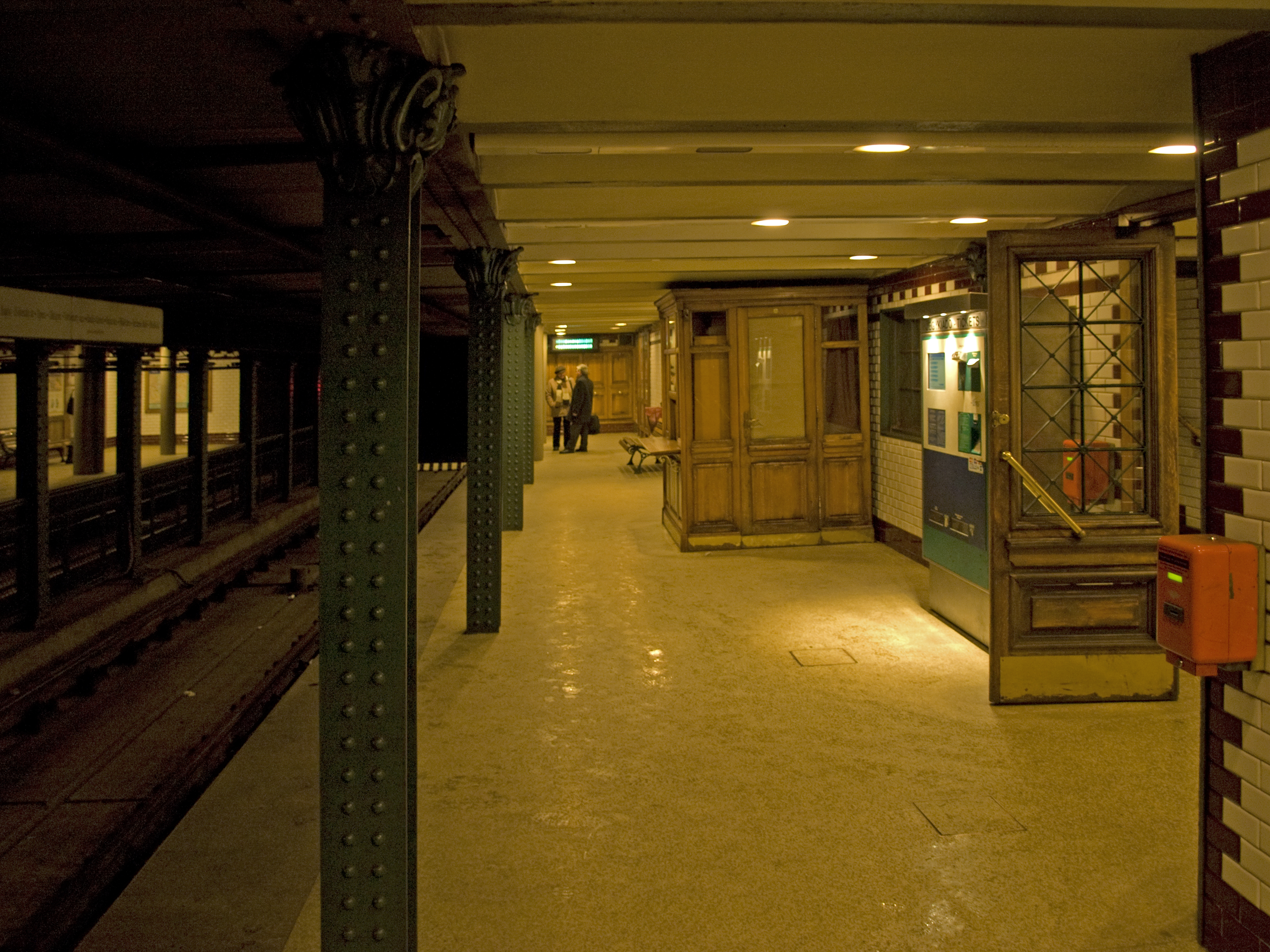
Eastbound platforms

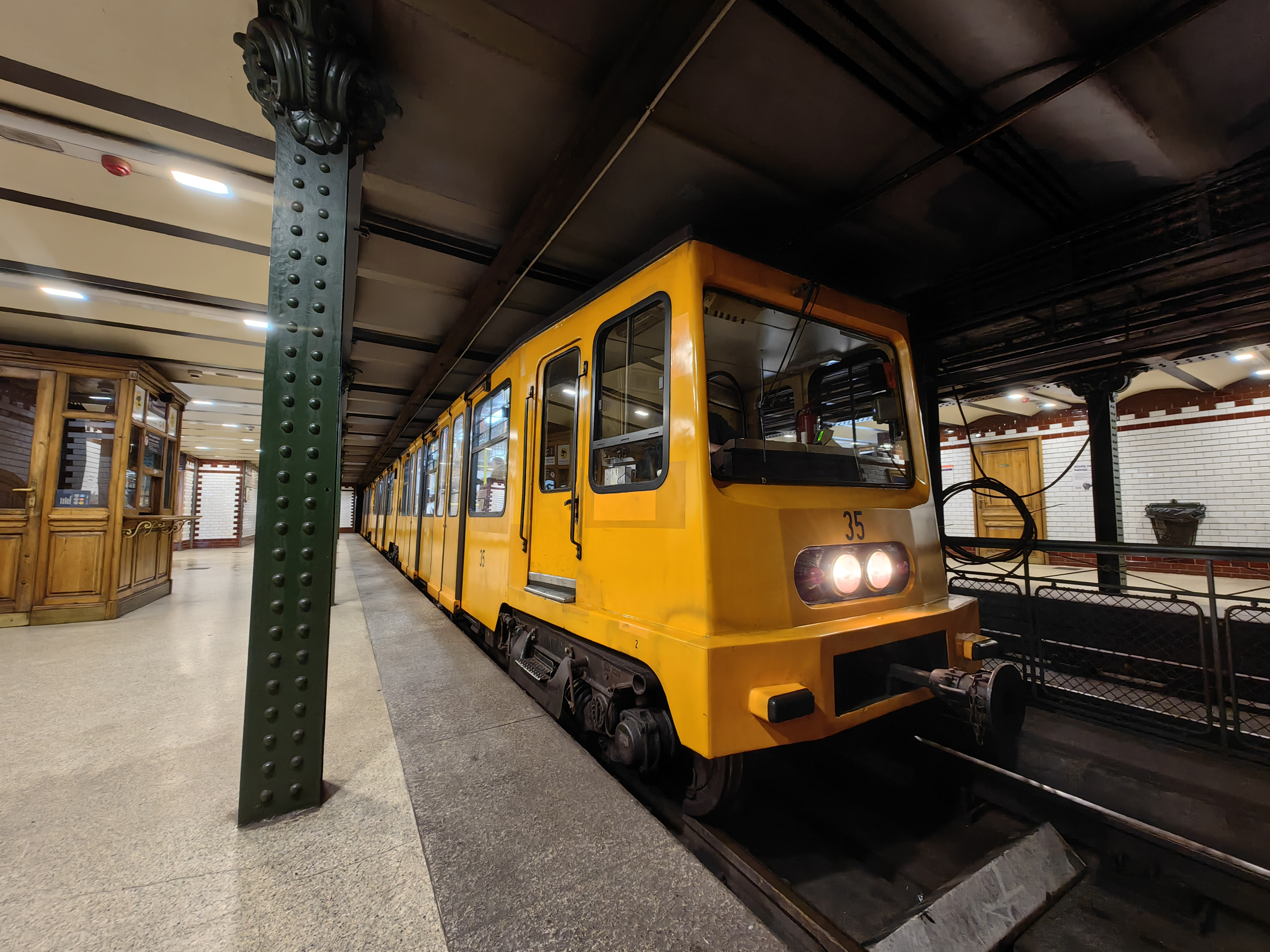
Train in station

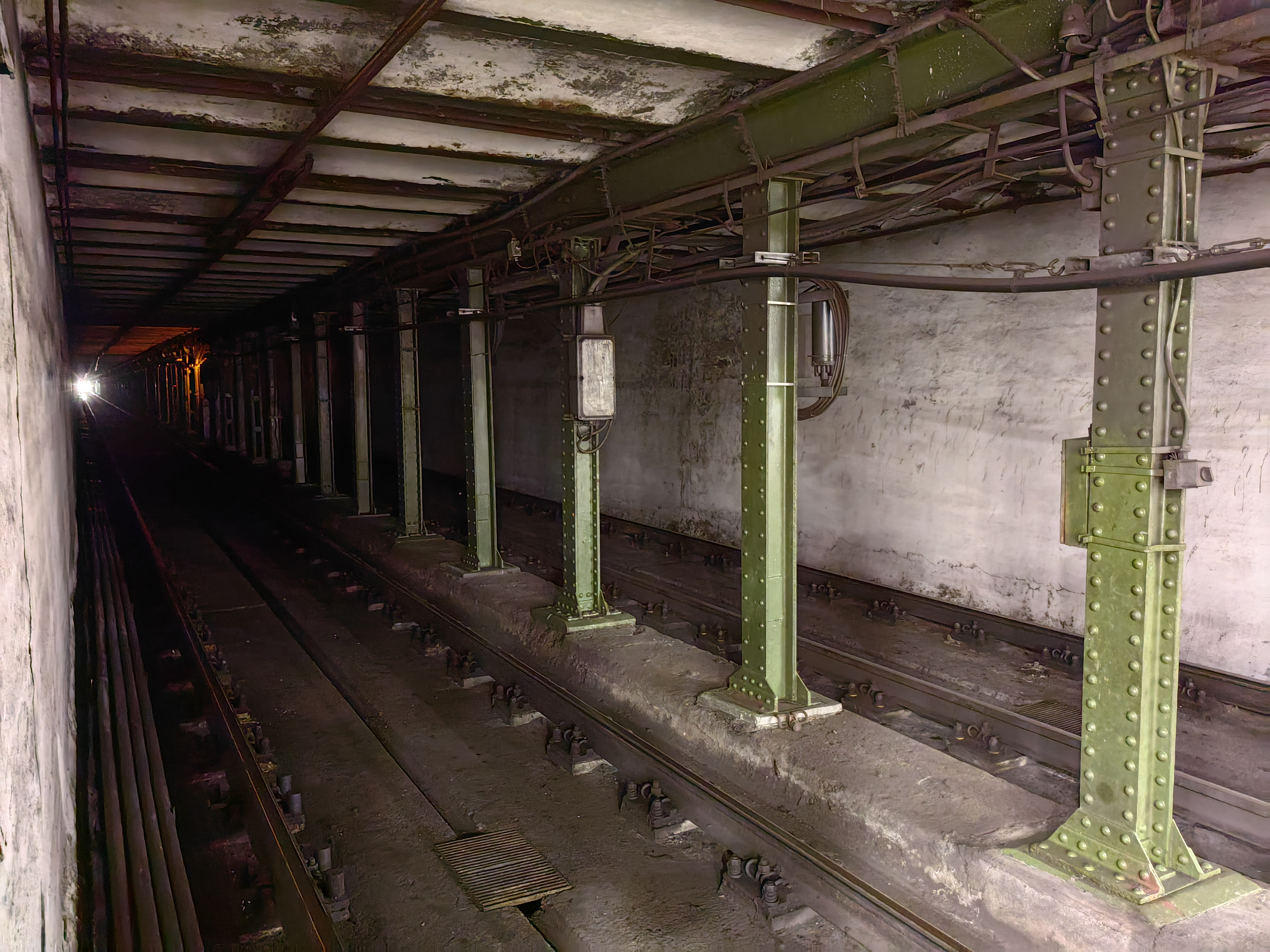
Track to the next station

== Connection ==
- Bus: 105, 210, 210B
