= Állatkert metro station =

Former Budapest metro station

Állatkert
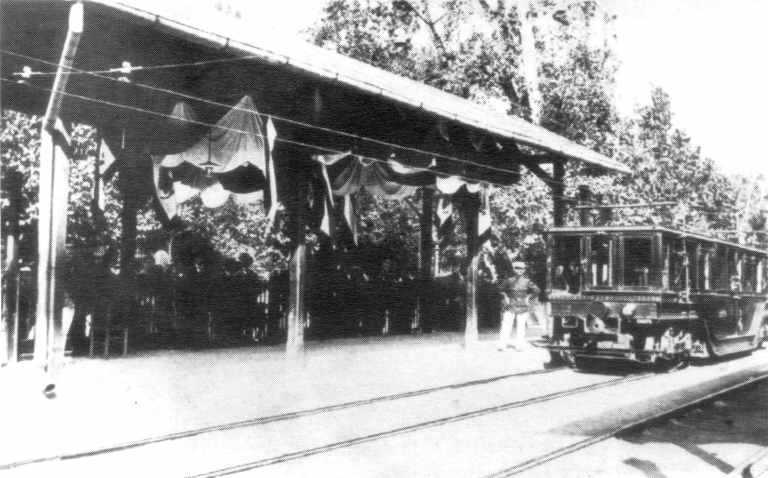

General information
- Location: Budapest; Hungary
- Coordinates: 47°31′04″N 19°04′41″E
- System: Budapest Metro station

History
- Opened: 3 May 1896
- Closed: 1973

Services
Preceding station	Budapest Metro	Following station
Hősök tere towards Vörösmarty tér	Line 1	Széchenyi fürdő towards Mexikói út
Location

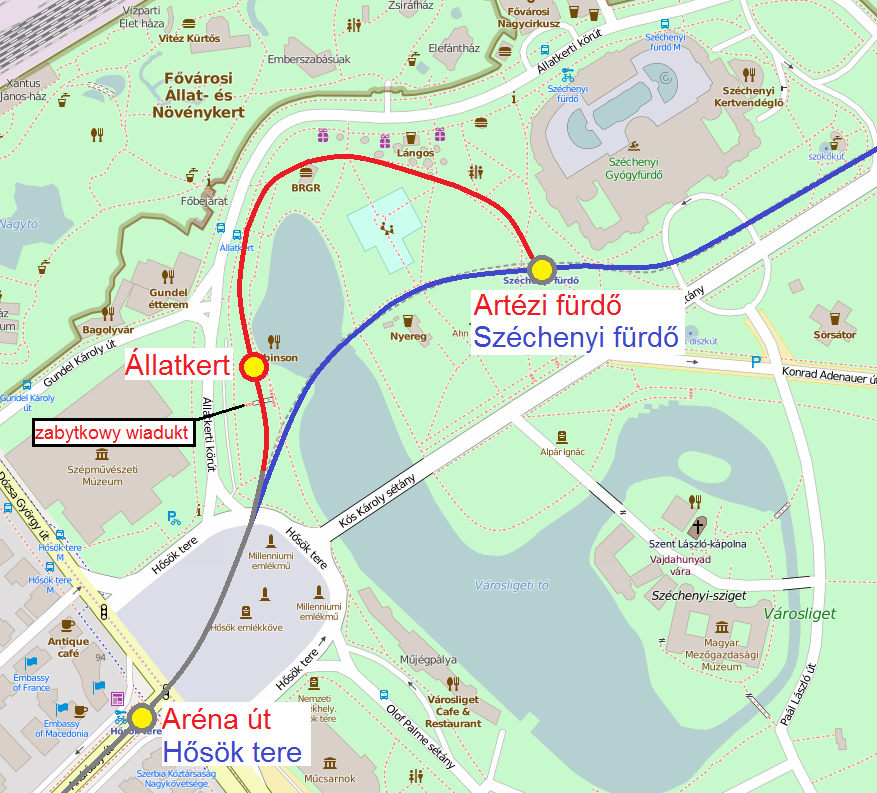
Állatkert station, the old and the new M1 route map

Állatkert was an above-ground station of the M1 line of the Budapest Metro. It existed between 1896 and 1973 on the original surface alignment of the line through the Városliget (City Park) from Hősök tere station to a surface terminus at Széchenyi fürdő station.

In 1973, in connection with the extension of the line to Mexikói út station, the line was diverted on a different route under the park. The old surface terminus at Széchényi fürdő was replaced by a new underground station on the same site, but Állatkert station was abandoned.

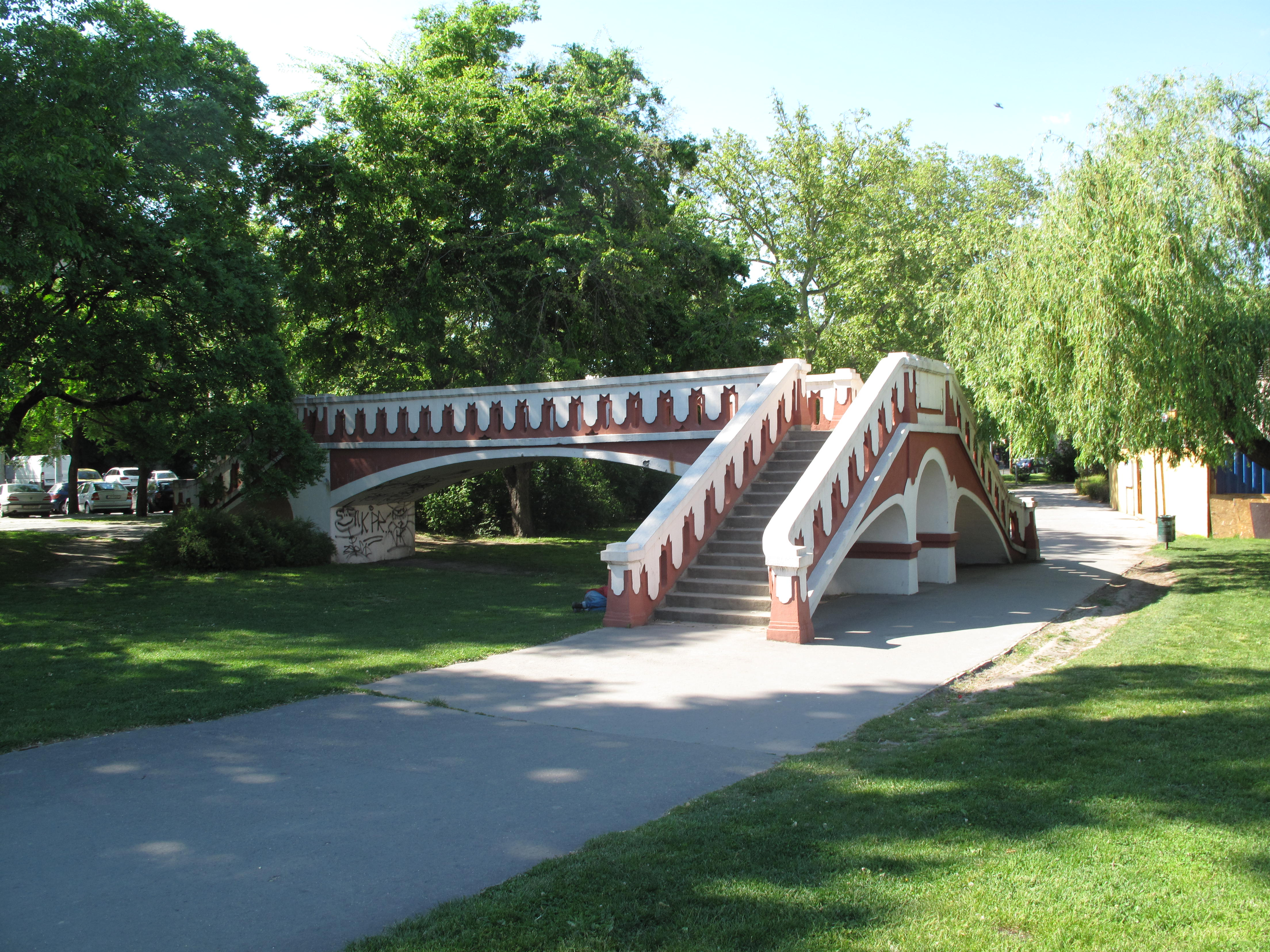
Wünsch bridge

The only remaining visible feature of the station and the railway it stood on is a bridge, which formerly crossed the metro line but now simply crosses a lawn. It is a very early example of a reinforced concrete bridge, designed by György Brüggemann and built by Róbert Wünsch.
