= Opera station =

Opera station may refer to:

- Opera (Antwerp premetro station), in Antwerp, Belgium
- Opéra station (Paris Metro), in Paris, France
- Ópera (Madrid Metro), in Madrid, Spain
- Opera metro station (Budapest), in Budapest, Hungary
- Guangzhou Opera House station, in Guangzhou, China

== See also ==
- Opera (disambiguation)
- Opera House station (disambiguation)
