= Opera metro station (Budapest) =

Budapest metro station

Opera
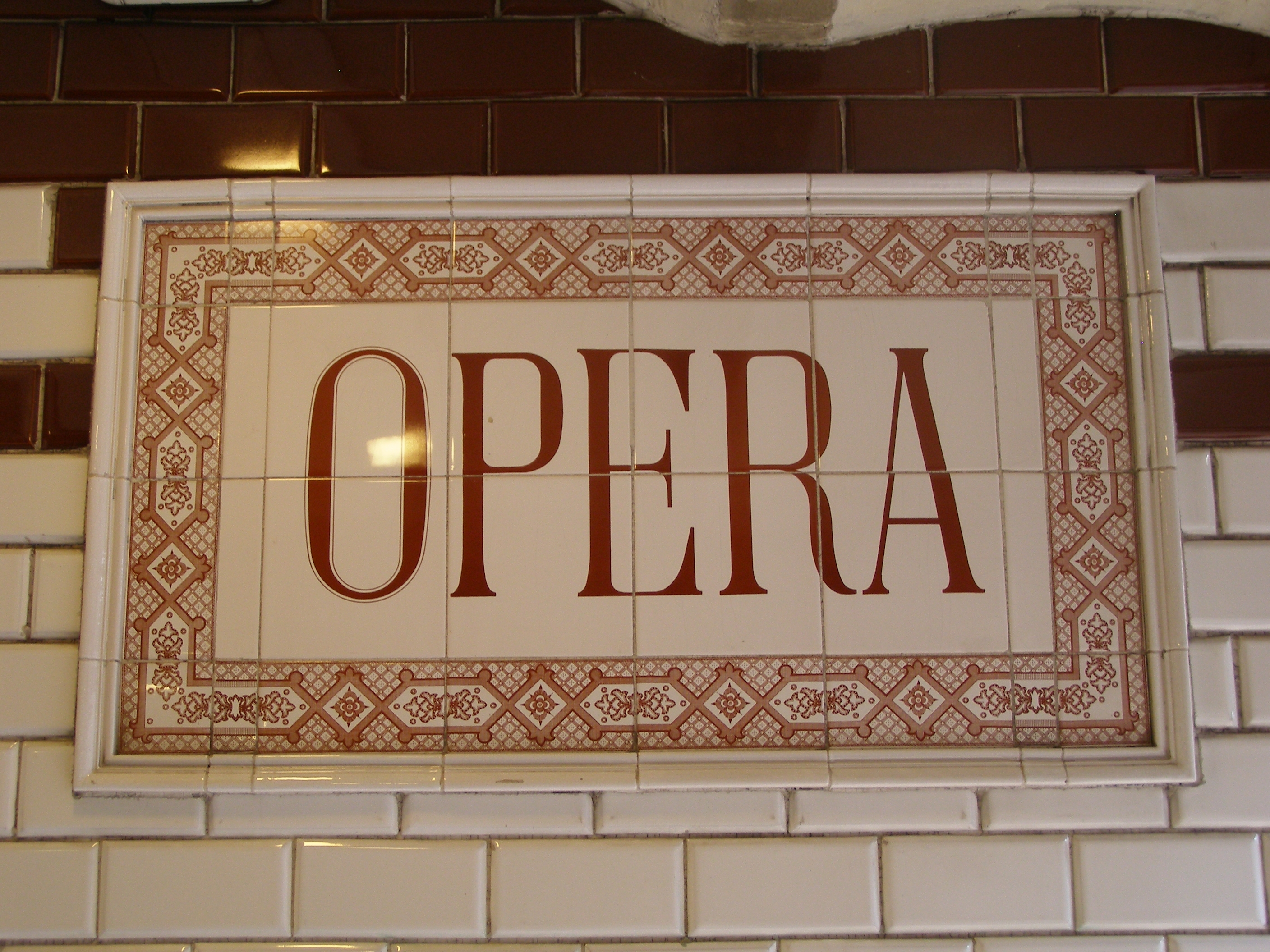
- Station name in original style

General information
- Location: Budapest; Hungary
- Coordinates: 47°30′08″N 19°03′31″E
- System: Budapest Metro station
- Platforms: 2 side platforms

Construction
- Structure type: cut-and-cover underground

History
- Opened: 2 May 1896

Services
Preceding station	Budapest Metro	Following station
Bajcsy-Zsilinszky út towards Vörösmarty tér	Line 1	Oktogon towards Mexikói út
Location

Opera is a station of the yellow M1 (Millennium Underground) line of the Budapest Metro. It is located under Andrássy Avenue in front of the Hungarian State Opera House.

The station was opened on 2 May 1896 as part of the inaugural section of the Budapest Metro, between Vörösmarty tér and Széchenyi fürdő. This section, known as the Millennium Underground Railway, was the first metro system in continental Europe. In 2002, it was included into the World Heritage Site "Budapest, including the Banks of the Danube, the Buda Castle Quarter and Andrássy Avenue".

The station has two side platforms, each with its own independent access from the street.

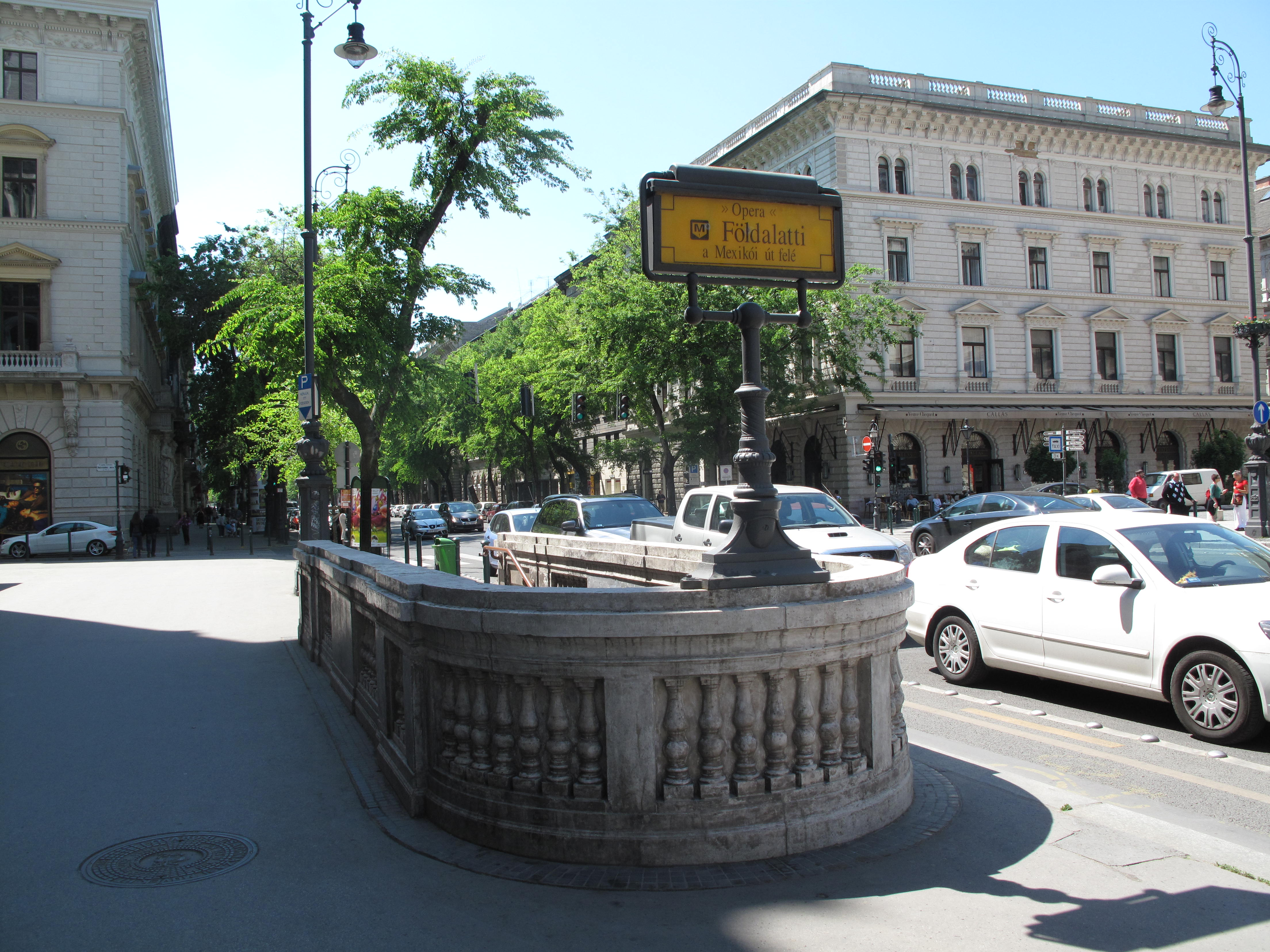
Station entrance from Andrássy Avenue

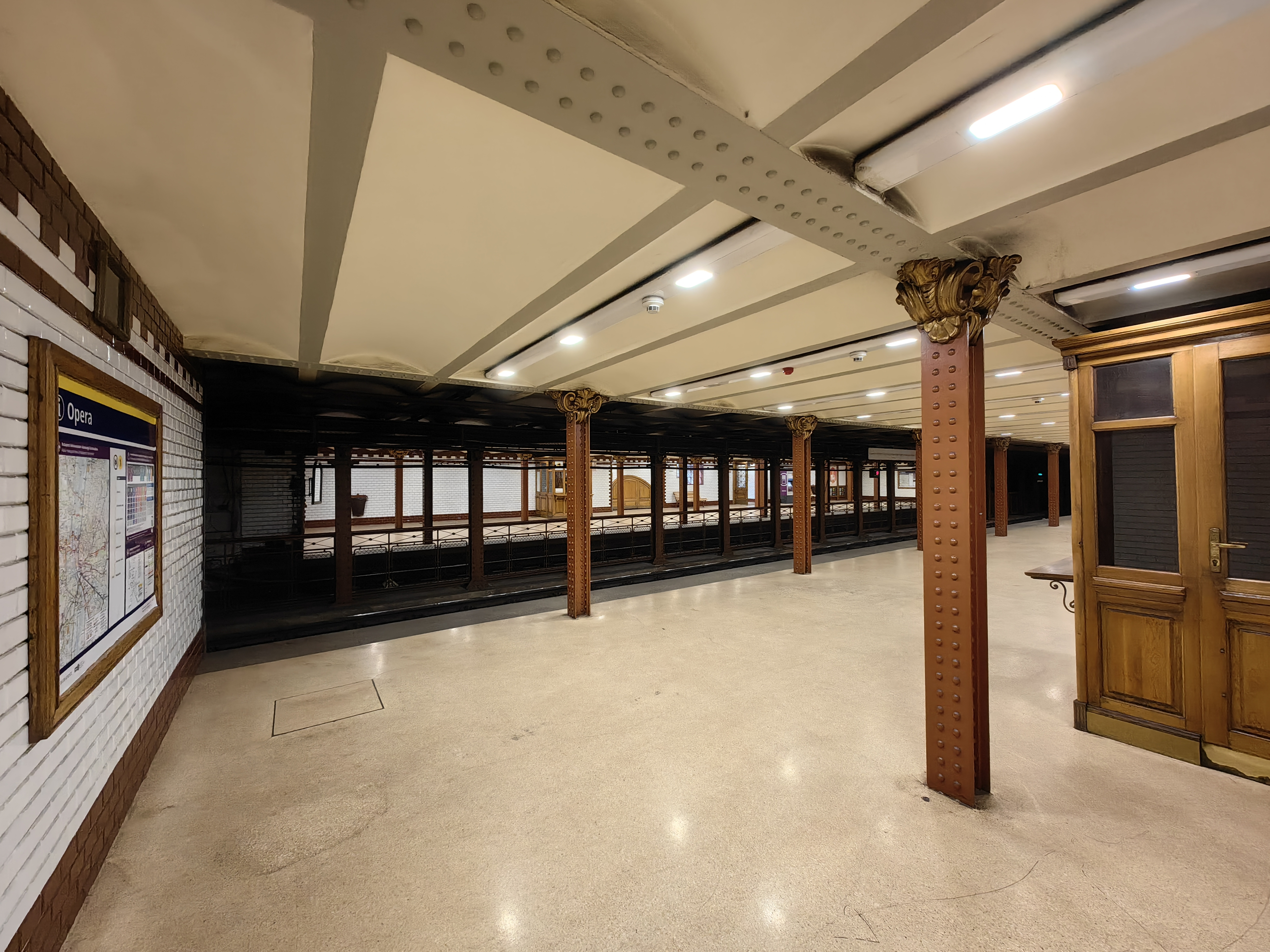
The station platforms

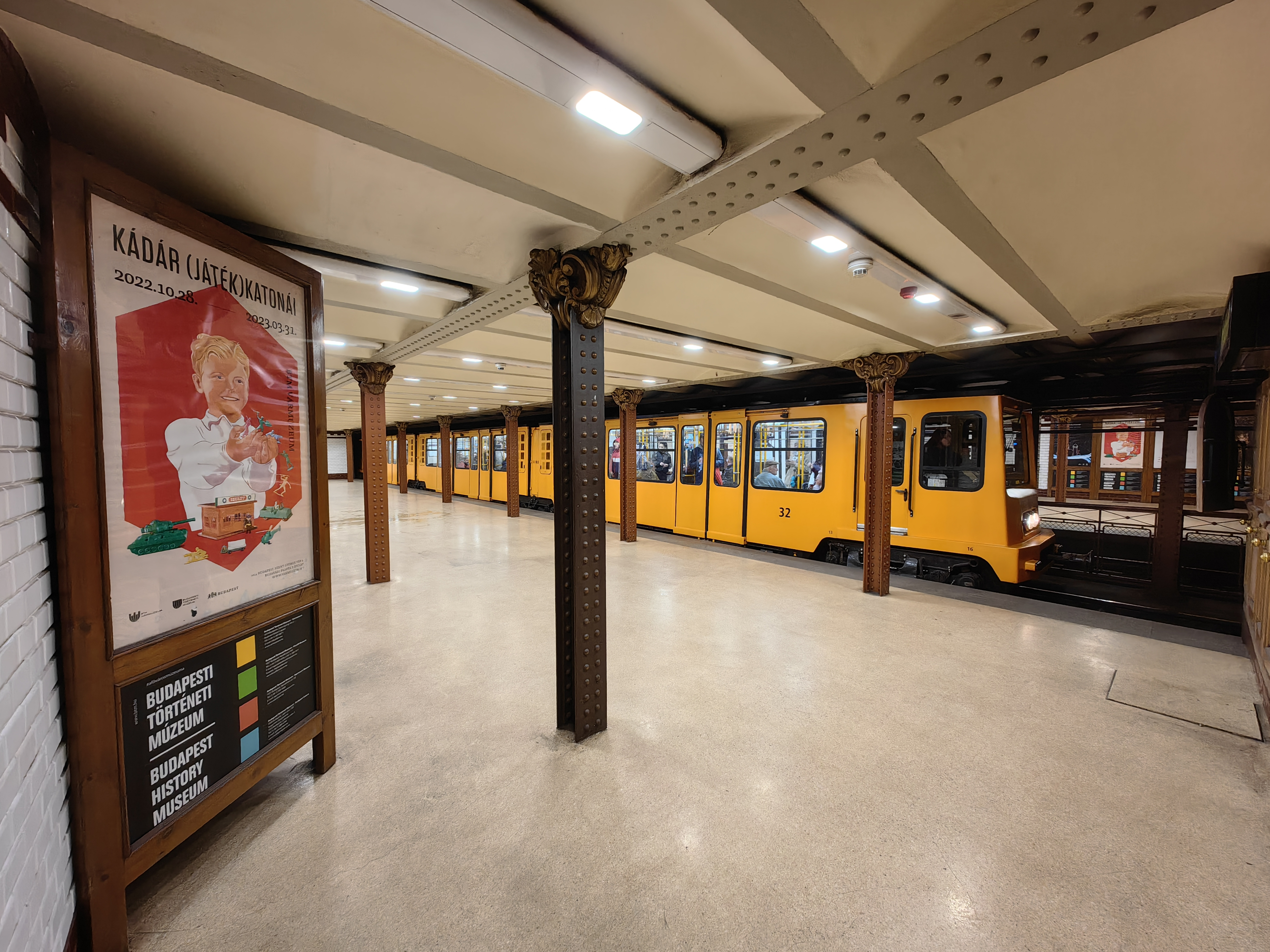
Train in the station

== Connection ==
- Bus: 105, 210, 210B
- Trolleybus: 70, 78
