= Opera (disambiguation) =

Opera is a Western performance art which combines music and drama.

Opera may also refer to:

== In arts and entertainment ==
=== Art forms ===
- Chinese opera, an art form combining music and drama rooted in traditional Chinese culture
- Opéra comique, a French opera genre
- List of opera genres, opera's many different forms

=== In music ===
- Opera (band), an Italian pop-rock band active between 1975 and 1985

==== Albums ====
- Opera (Andrea Bocelli album)
- Opera (Tosca album), 1997
- Ópera, 1991 album by Todmobile
- Opera (Fleshgod Apocalypse album), 2024

==== Songs ====
- "Opera" (Çetin Alp song), 1983
- "Opera" (Super Junior song), 2012
- Opera (Patty Pravo song), 2026
- "The Opera", a song from the musical Natasha, Pierre & The Great Comet of 1812
- "The Opera", a 1998 song by R. Kelly from the album R. (R. Kelly album)

=== Opera companies and venues ===
- Opera Comique, London theatre (1870–1902), known for Gilbert and Sullivan operas
- Opéra-Comique, Paris opera company and opera house
- Opera house, a theatre building used for opera performances
- Opéra, a commonly used name for the Paris Opera

=== Magazines ===
- Opera (British magazine), a British publication covering opera
- Opera (Japanese magazine), a Japanese manga magazine

=== Other uses in arts and entertainment ===
- Opera (1973 short), an animated film by Bruno Bozzetto
- Opera (1987 film), a horror film by Dario Argento
- Opera (2020 film), a South Korean/American animated short film
- "Opera" (The Super Mario Bros. Super Show!), a 1989 live-action episode of the TV series
- "The Opera" (Seinfeld), a 1992 episode of the TV series
- The Opera, a 2001 mod for the video game Half-Life, see List of GoldSrc mods

== Businesses ==
- Opera (fabrica ecclesiae), non profit foundations for the maintenance of churches and religious buildings in Italy
- Opera, a Japanese adult video studio founded by Kaoru Toyoda
- Opera (company), the Norwegian company that developed the Opera web browser

== Places ==
- Opera metro station (Budapest), a station of the Millennium Underground line of the Budapest Metro
- Opéra station (Paris Metro), a station of the Paris rapid transit system
- Opera, Lombardy, a municipality in the province of Milan, Italy

== In science and technology ==
- Opera (web browser) and Opera Software, the Norwegian software company behind it
- OPERA experiment, a particle-physics experiment aiming to detect neutrino oscillations
- OPERA, a property-management system for hotels, developed and marketed by MICROS Systems, Inc.

== Other uses ==
- OPERA, one of the five words in the first-century Latin word square, the Sator Square
- MSC Opera, a cruise ship
- Opera cake, a type of French cake
- Operation Opera, a 1981 Israeli air strike
- Opera publica (lit. 'public works'), construction or engineering projects carried out in ancient Rome
- T. M. Opera O, a Japanese Thoroughbred racehorse

== See also ==
- Horse opera, melodramatic, formulaic Western movie or TV series
- Opus (disambiguation)
- Rock opera, a rock album or performance in which the songs form a cohesive story
- Soap opera (disambiguation)
- Space Opera (disambiguation)
