= At the Opera =

At the Opera may refer to:

- At the Opera (Cassatt), also known as In the Loge, an 1878 painting by Mary Cassatt
- At the Opera (Frith), an 1855 painting by William Powell Frith

== See also ==
- Opera (disambiguation)
