= Heroes' Square =

Heroes' Square, Heldenplatz, Hősök tere, or Piazzale degli Eroi may refer to:

- Heldenplatz, Vienna, Austria
- National Heroes Square or Trafalgar Square, Bridgetown, Barbados
- Heroes' Square (Budapest), Budapest, Hungary
  - Hősök tere metro station
- Heroes' Square, Downtown Miskolc, Hungary
- Piazzale degli Eroi, the terminus of the Aqueduct of Peschiera, Rome, Italy
