= Hősök tere metro station =

Budapest metro station

Hősök tere
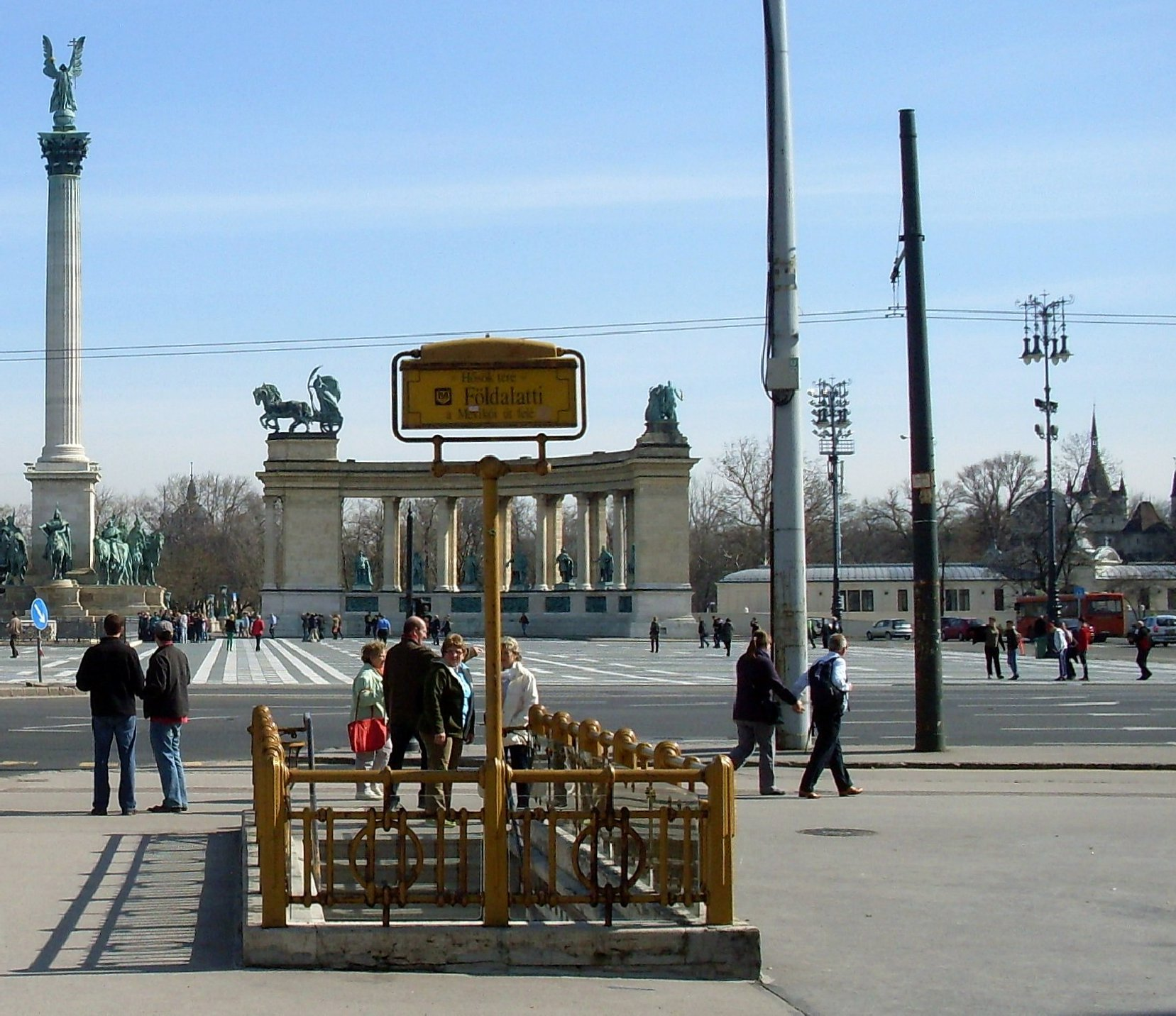
- Station entrance with Heroes' Square behind

General information
- Location: Hősök tere, Budapest; Hungary
- Coordinates: 47°30′52″N 19°04′37″E
- System: Budapest Metro station
- Platforms: 2 side platforms

Construction
- Structure type: cut-and-cover underground

History
- Opened: 2 May 1896

Services
Preceding station	Budapest Metro	Following station
Bajza utca towards Vörösmarty tér	Line 1	Széchenyi fürdő towards Mexikói út
Location

Hősök tere is a station of the yellow M1 line of the Budapest Metro. Formerly called Aréna út station, it lies under Hősök tere (Heroes' Square) at the outer end of Andrássy Avenue.

The station was opened on 2 May 1896 as part of the inaugural section of the Budapest Metro, between Vörösmarty tér and Széchenyi fürdő. This section, known as the Millennium Underground Railway, was the first metro system in continental Europe. In 2002, it was included into the World Heritage Site "Budapest, including the Banks of the Danube, the Buda Castle Quarter and Andrássy Avenue".

Until 1973, the line came to the surface just beyond Hősök tere and followed an indirect surface alignment through the Városliget (City Park), passing the intermediate Állatkert station to a surface terminus at Széchenyi fürdő. In 1973 the line was diverted at Hősök tere and extended to a new terminus at Mexikói út station. The new extension followed a new underground route beneath the park, with a new intermediate station at the site of the previous terminus. Állatkert station was closed.

The station has two side platforms, each with its own independent access from the street.

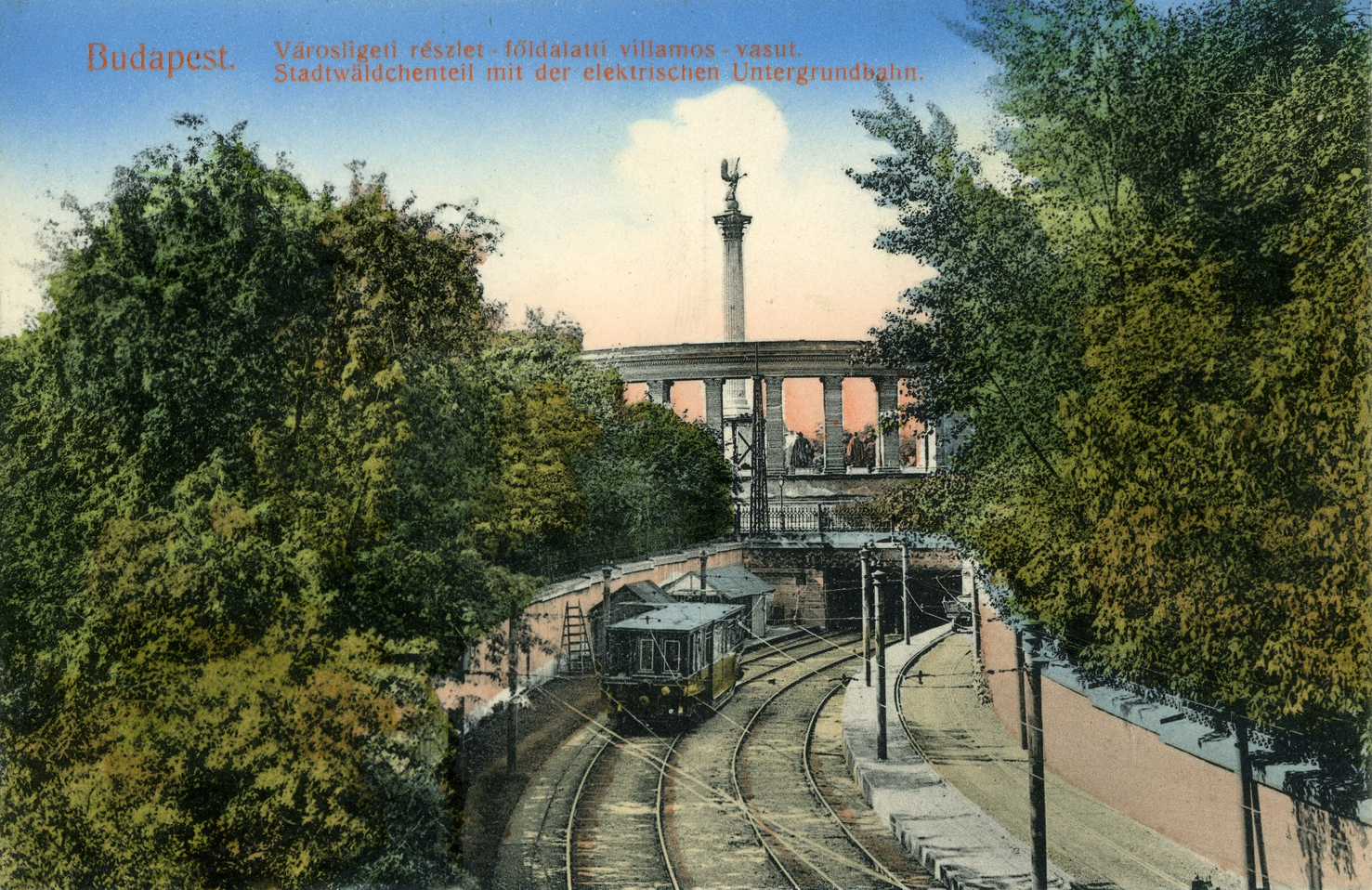
The former tunnel exit

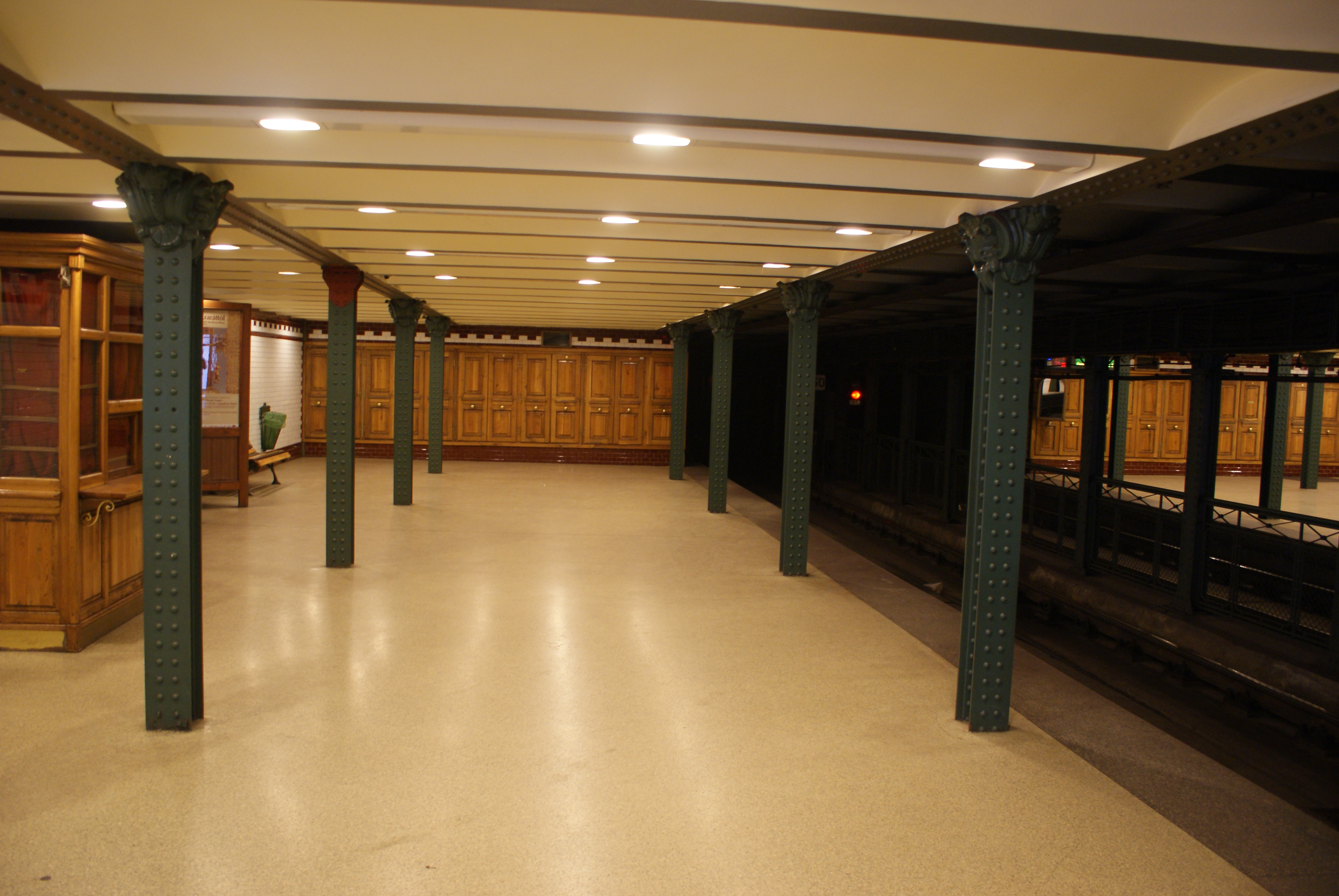
The station platform

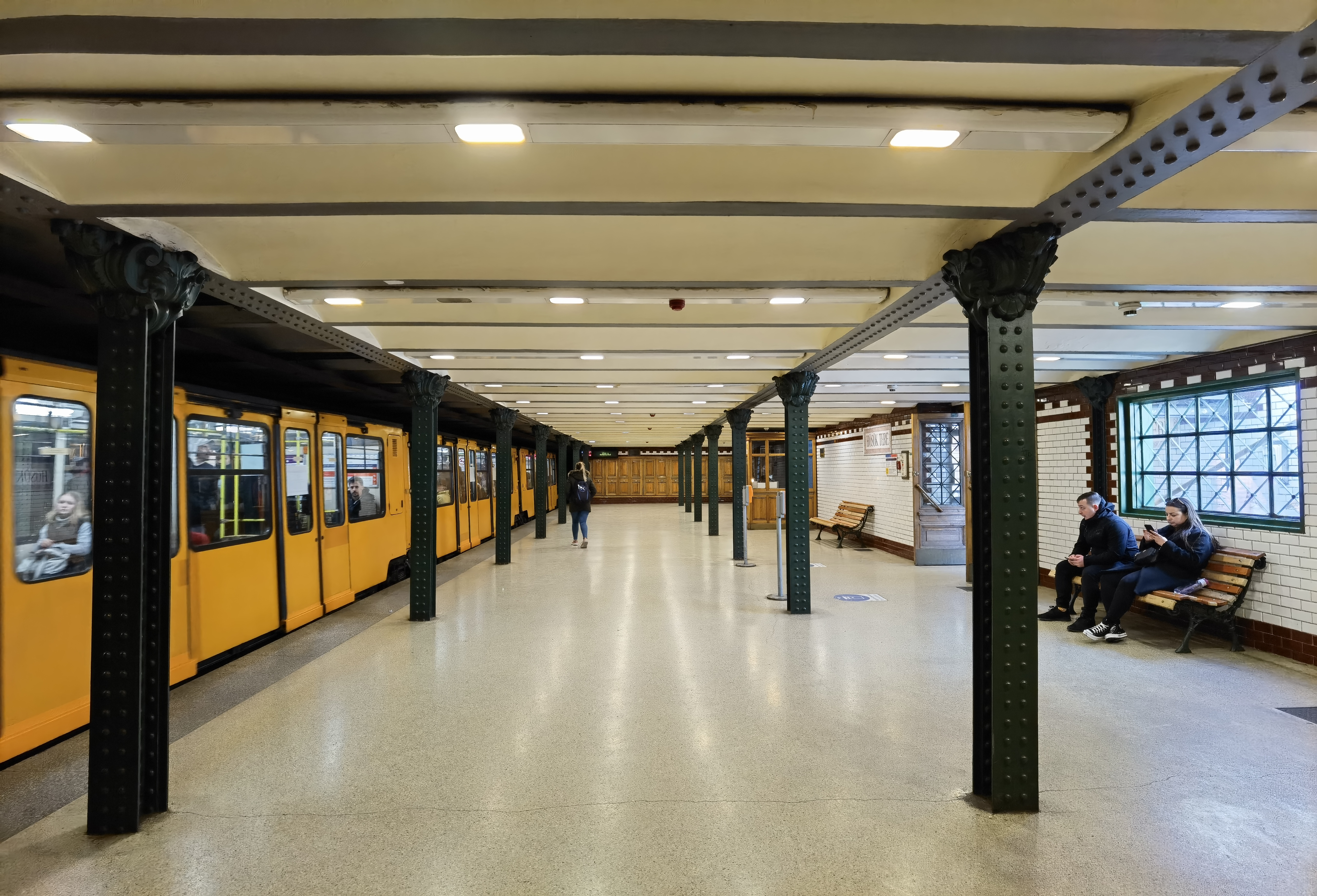
Platform with train

== Connections ==
- Bus: 20E, 30, 30A, 105, 210, 210B, 230
- Trolleybus: 72, 75, 79
