= Opera House station =

Opera House station may refer to:

- Guangzhou Opera House station, in Guangzhou, China
- Opera House station (Shenzhen), in Shenzhen, China
- Opera House station (Ho Chi Minh City), in Ho Chi Minh City, Vietnam

== See also ==
- Opera station (disambiguation)
