= Space Opera (disambiguation) =

Space opera is a subgenre of science fiction.

Space Opera may also refer to:

== Media ==
- Space Opera (role-playing game), a science-fiction RPG created by Edward E. Simbalist, A. Mark Ratner, and Phil McGregor
- Space Opera, a 1987 album by French composer and musician Didier Marouani
- "Space Opera", a first-season episode of the American musical children's television series Jack's Big Music Show

=== Literature ===
- Space Opera (1974 anthology), anthology of classic science fiction short stories edited by Brian Aldiss
- Space Opera (1996 anthology), anthology of science fiction short stories and novelettes edited by Anne McCaffrey and Elizabeth Scarborough
- Space Opera (Valente novel), a 2018 science fiction novel by Catherynne Valente
- Space Opera (Vance novel), a 1965 science fiction novel by the American science fiction author Jack Vance
- "Space Opera", a 1961 short story written by Ray Russell

== Other ==
- Space opera in Scientology, the Xenu story and other doctrines of Scientology

== See also ==
- The New Space Opera, a science fiction anthology edited by Gardner Dozois and Jonathan Strahan
- The New Space Opera 2, a science fiction anthology edited by Gardner Dozois and Jonathan Strahan
- Newton's Wake: A Space Opera, a science fiction novel by British writer Ken MacLeod
