= Soap opera (disambiguation) =

A soap opera is an ongoing, episodic work of fiction presented in serial format on television, radio, or other media.

Soap opera may also refer to:

== Films ==
- Soap Opera (1964 film), a 1964 film by Andy Warhol
- Soap Opera, a 2004 film by Wuershan
- Soap Opera (2014 film), a 2014 film starring Cristiana Capotondi

== Periodicals ==
- Soap Opera Digest, a magazine chronicling the stories airing on American soap operas and the off-screen lives of the actors
- Soap Opera Magazine, a weekly periodical devoted to interviews and recaps of American soap operas
- Soap Opera Update, a magazine dedicated to the coverage of soap operas
- Soap Opera Weekly, a soap magazine which features soap operas and soap stars

== Other uses ==
- Soap Opera (album), a 1975 album by The Kinks
- Soap Opera Digest Awards, award show held by the daytime television magazine Soap Opera Digest
- Soap opera effect, a video side effect of LCD TVs with motion interpolation technology
- Soap opera rapid aging syndrome, a continuity error in literature or television

== See also ==
- Soap (TV series)
- Telenovela (TV series)
- Telenovela
