= Széchenyi fürdő metro station =

Budapest metro station

Széchenyi fürdő
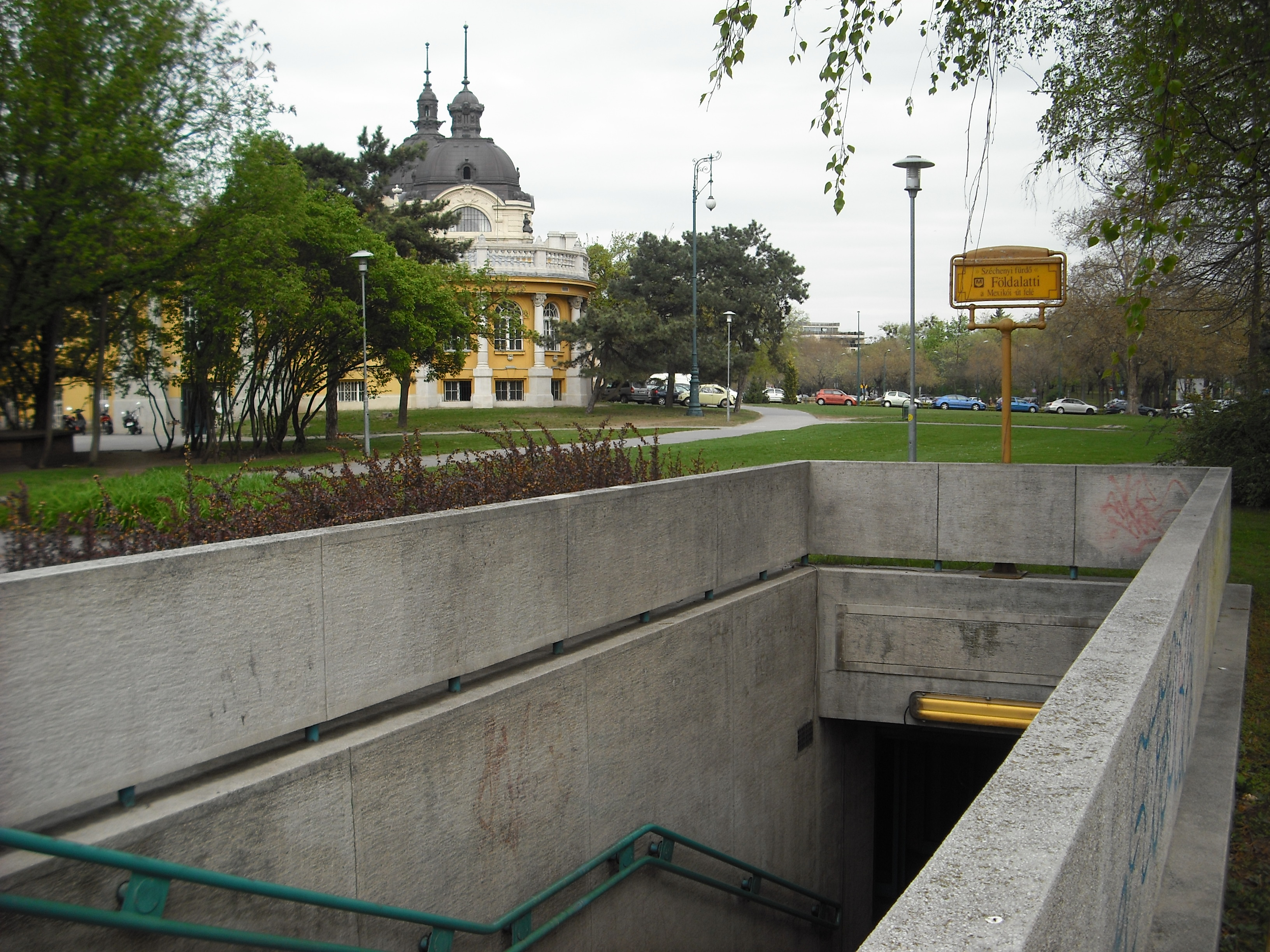
- Station entrance, with Széchenyi baths behind

General information
- Location: Budapest; Hungary
- Coordinates: 47°31′02″N 19°04′51″E
- System: Budapest Metro station
- Platforms: 2 side platforms

Construction
- Structure type: cut-and-cover underground

History
- Opened: 2 May 1896

Services
Preceding station	Budapest Metro	Following station
Hősök tere towards Vörösmarty tér	Line 1	Mexikói út Terminus
Location

Széchenyi fürdő is a station of the yellow M1 (Millennium Underground) line of the Budapest Metro, located in the centre of the Városliget (City Park) near the Széchenyi Medicinal Bath. It was formerly called Artézi fürdő station.

Széchenyi fürdő was the original terminus of the inaugural section of the Budapest Metro from Vörösmarty tér. This section, known as the Millennium Underground Railway, was the first metro system in continental Europe. In 2002, it was included into the World Heritage Site "Budapest, including the Banks of the Danube, the Buda Castle Quarter and Andrássy Avenue".

There have actually been two stations on the same site. The original station was opened on 2 May 1896 as a surface-level terminal station. It was connected to the underground Hősök tere station by an indirect surface alignment through Állatkert station and the park. On 30 December 1973, a diverted and extended line was opened under the park to Mexikói út station, and a new underground through station was opened at Széchenyi fürdő. At the same time, Állatkert station was abandoned.

The station has two side platforms, each with its own independent access from the street.

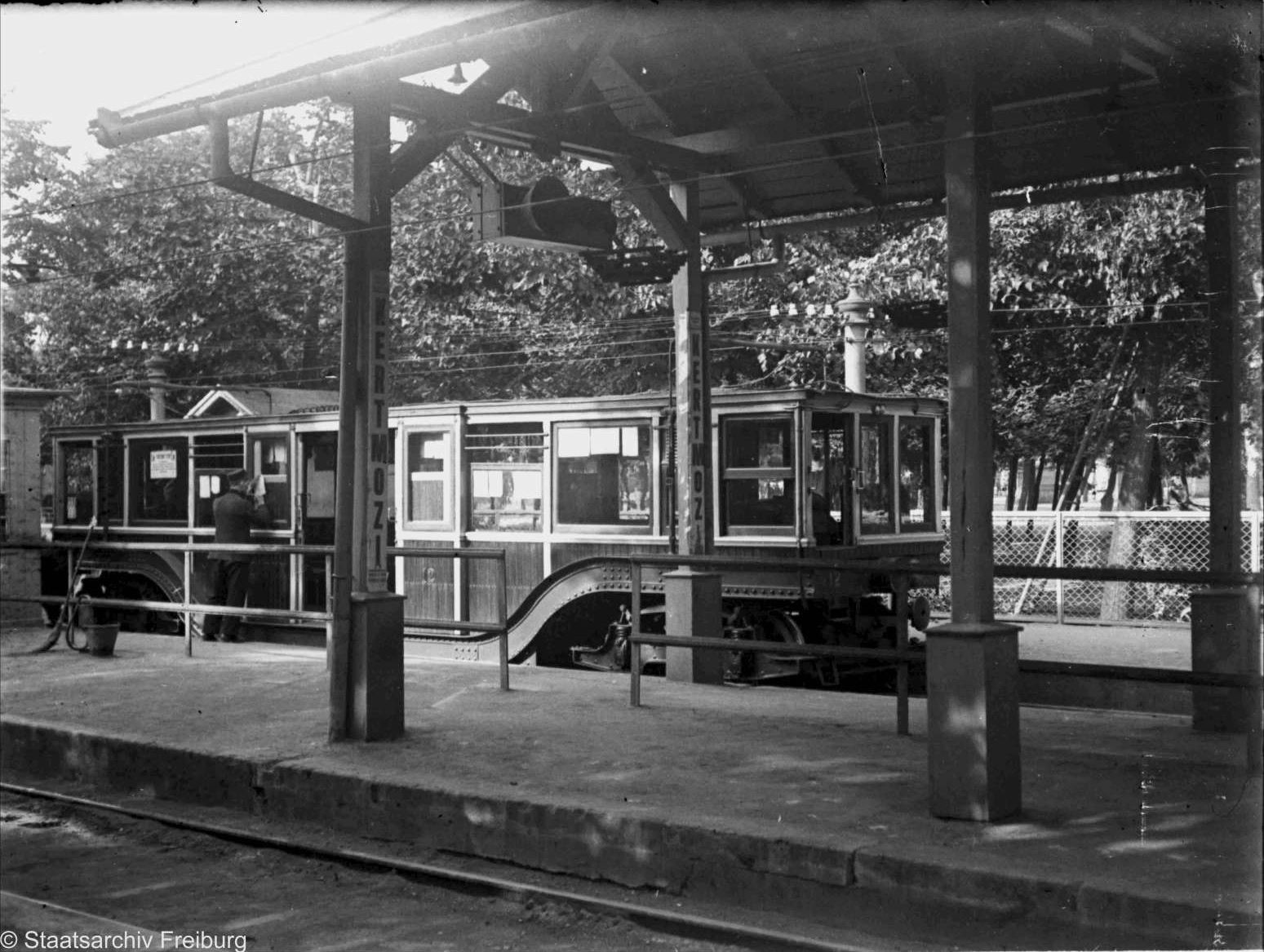
The original above-ground terminus in the 1920s

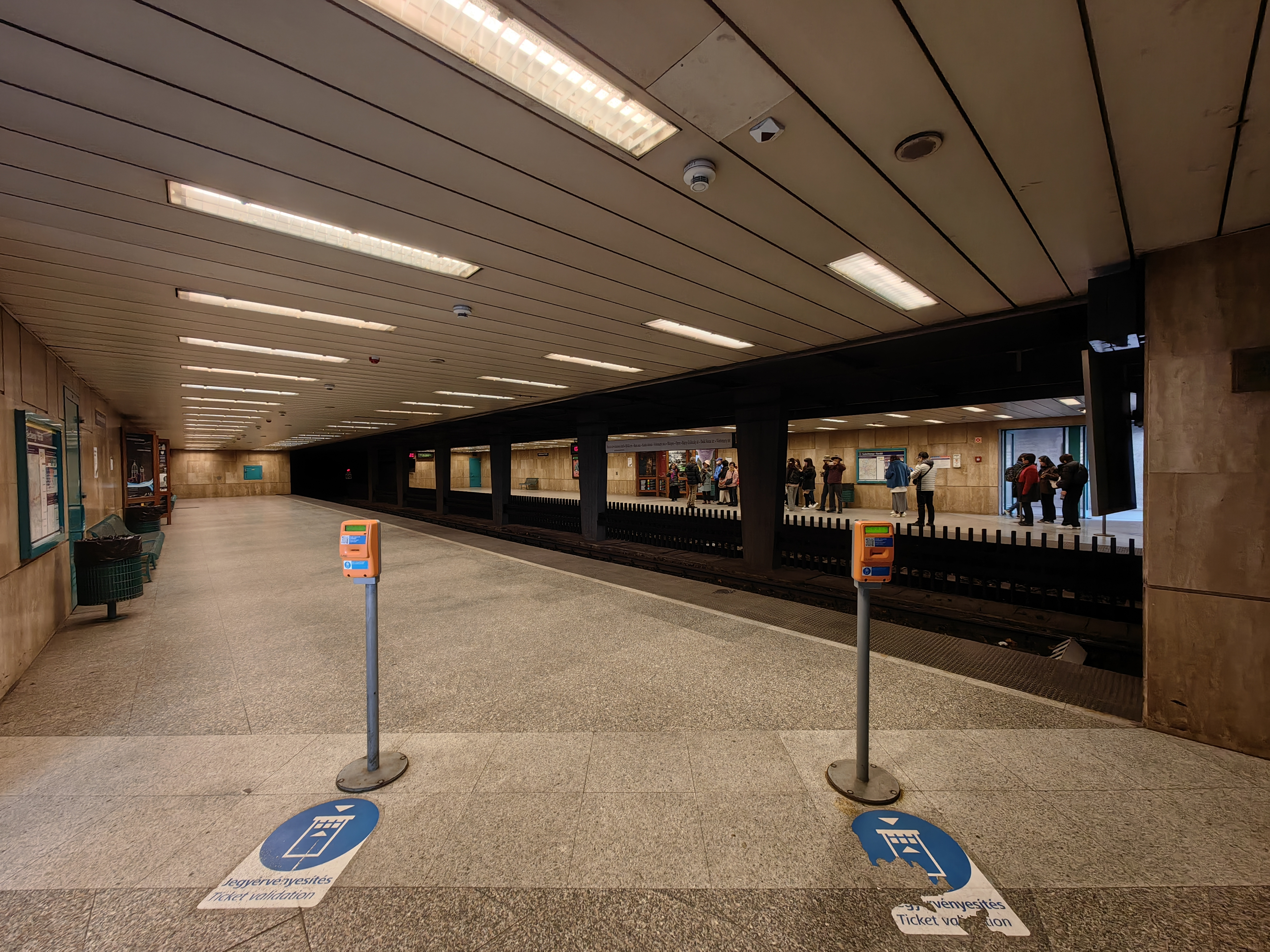
The underground platforms dating from 1973

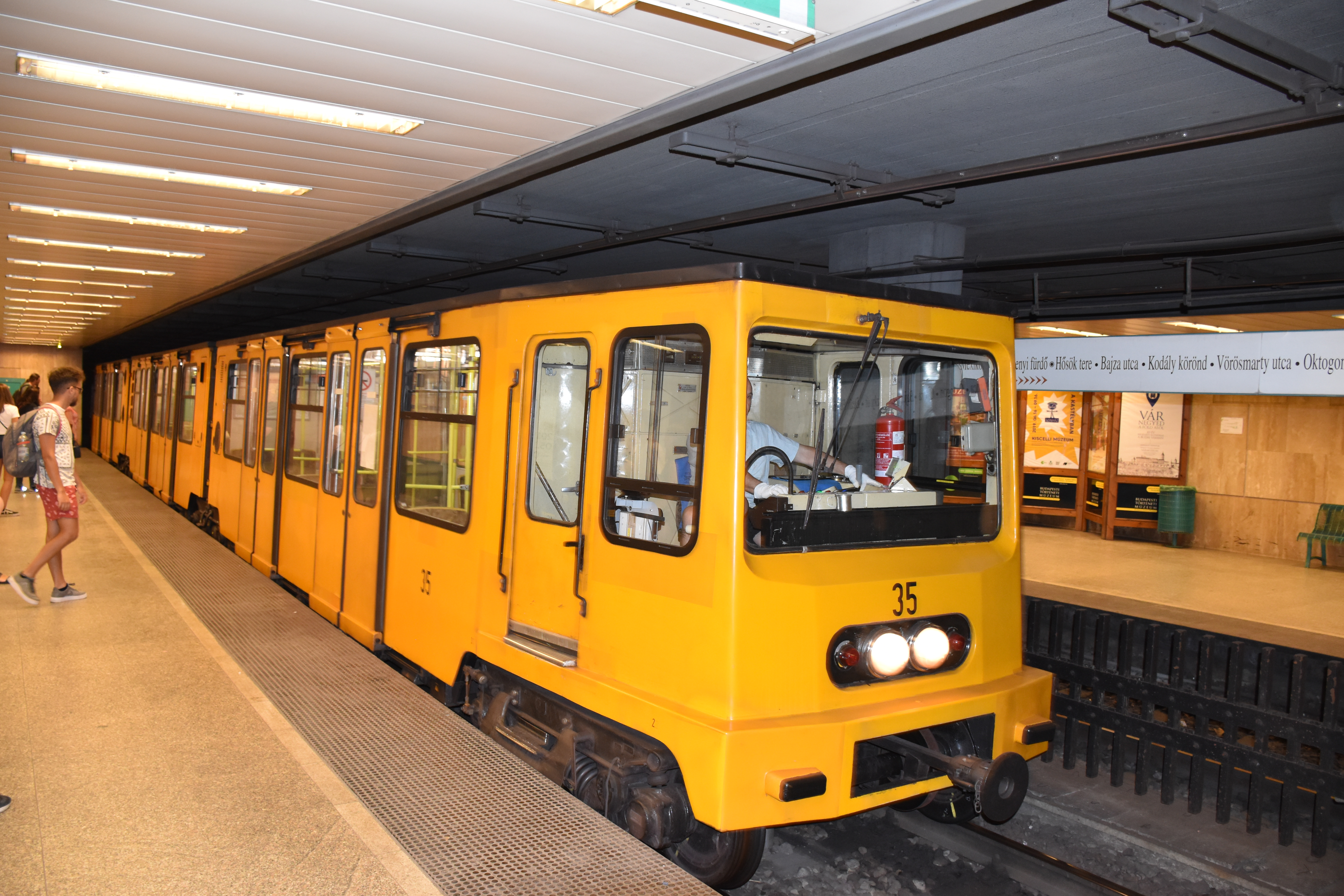
A train at the platforms

== Connection ==
- Trolleybus: 72
