= Mexikói út metro station =

Budapest metro station

Mexikói út
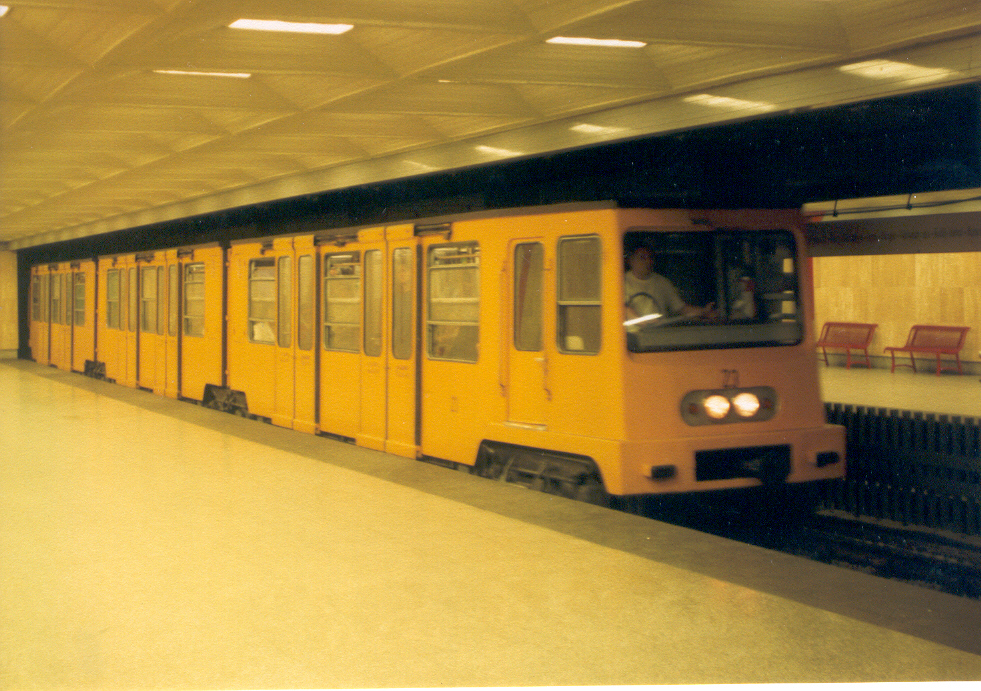

General information
- Location: Budapest; Hungary
- Coordinates: 47°31′10″N 19°05′28″E
- System: Budapest Metro station
- Platforms: 2 side platforms

Construction
- Structure type: cut-and-cover underground

History
- Opened: December 30, 1973

Services
Preceding station	Budapest Metro	Following station
Széchenyi fürdő towards Vörösmarty tér	Line 1	Terminus
Location

Mexikói út (lit. Mexican street) is the northern terminus of the yellow M1 (Millennium Underground) line of the Budapest Metro. It is located in the Zugló district of Pest.

== History ==
Mexikói út was opened on 30 December 1973 when the line was extended from the original terminus at Városliget (City Park).

== Description ==
Akin to all Millennium Underground line stations, Mexikói út has two side platforms, one serving each direction of travel. To the north of the station are a pair of sidings and the access to the line's depot, and arriving trains stop to set down passenger at the northbound platform, pull forward into one of the sidings to reverse, and then pick up passengers at the southbound platform.

The line's depot lies at ground level to the east of the station, and is accessed by a ramped track from the underground station. The depot also has a track access to the city's tram network.

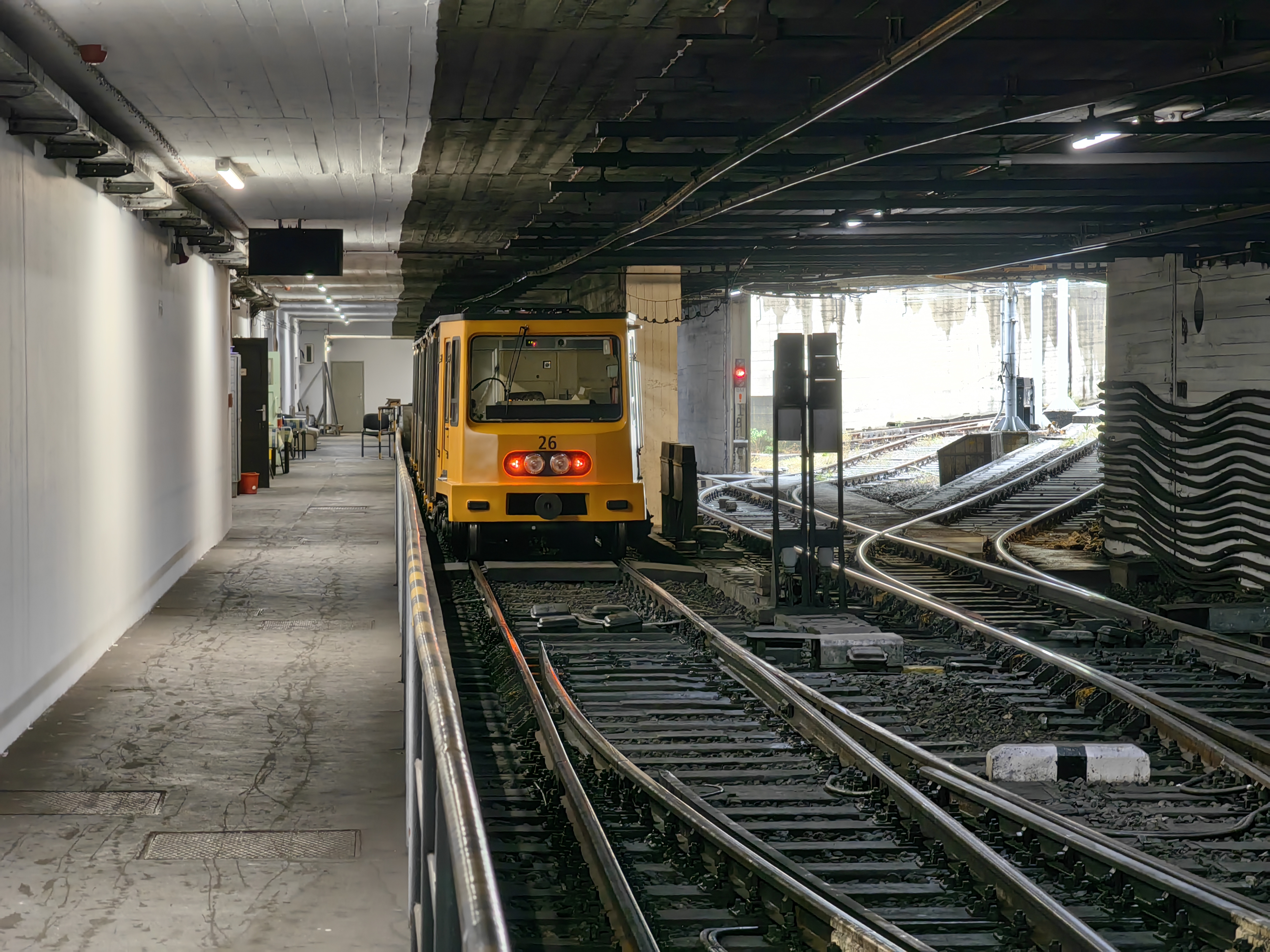
The turnback sidings (ahead) and depot access (right)

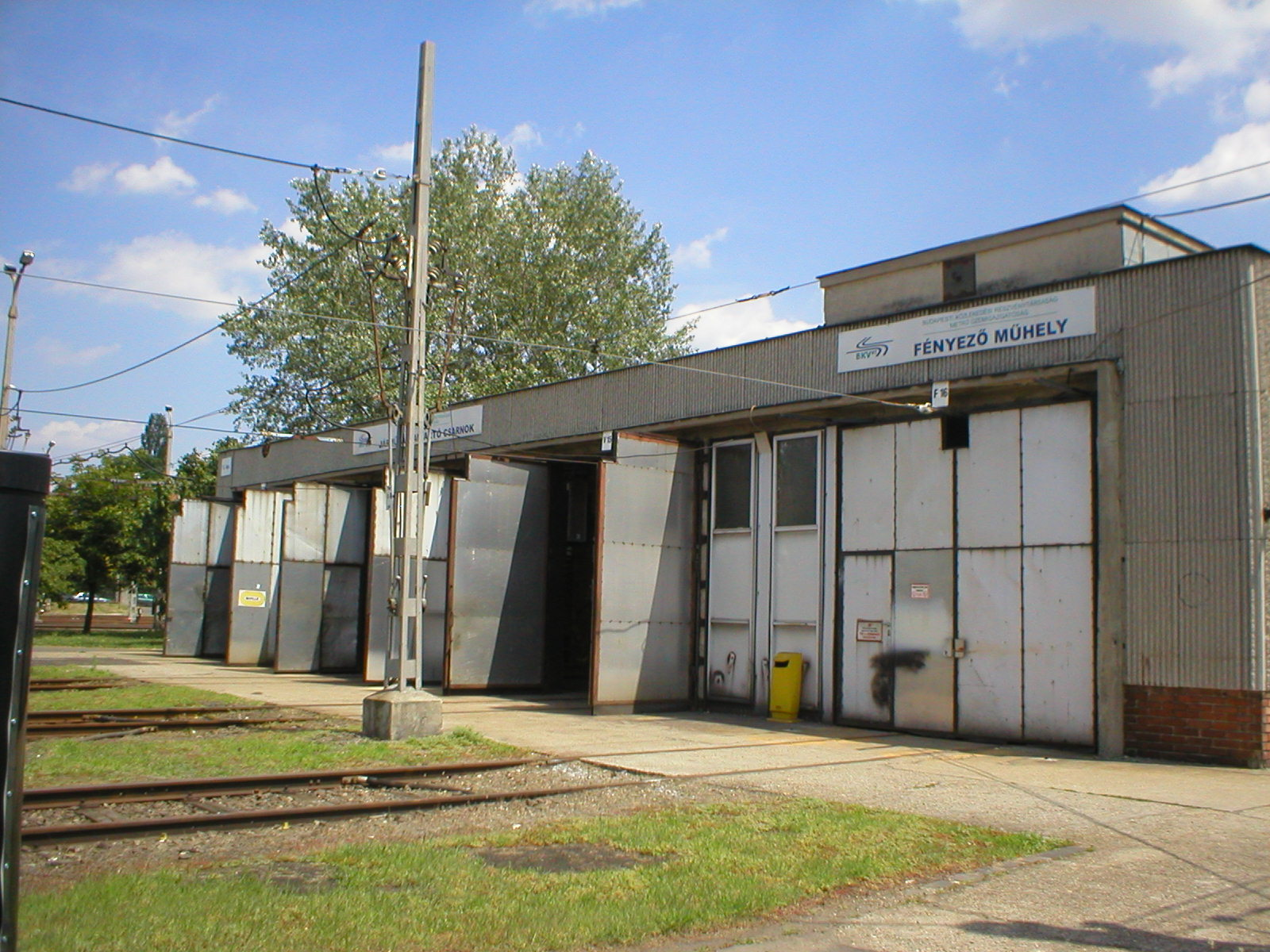
The depot

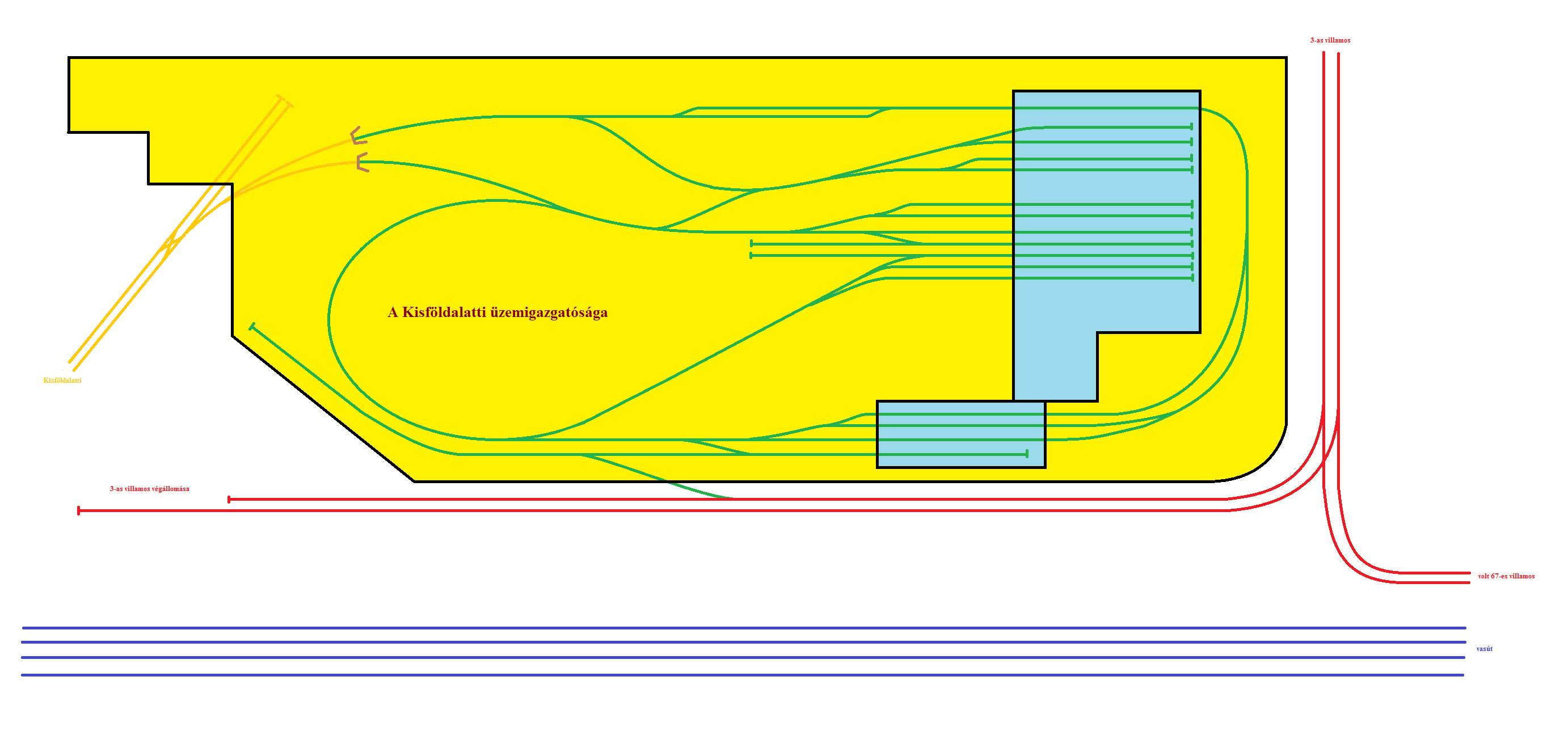
Terminus and depot layout (yellow=underground; green=depot tracks; red=tram tracks; blue=rail tracks)

== Connections ==
The station provides onward connections with the following BKV services:

- Bus: 25, 32, 225
- Trolleybus: 74, 74A, 82
- Tram: 1, 1M, 3, 69
