= Vörösmarty tér metro station =

Budapest metro station

Vörösmarty tér
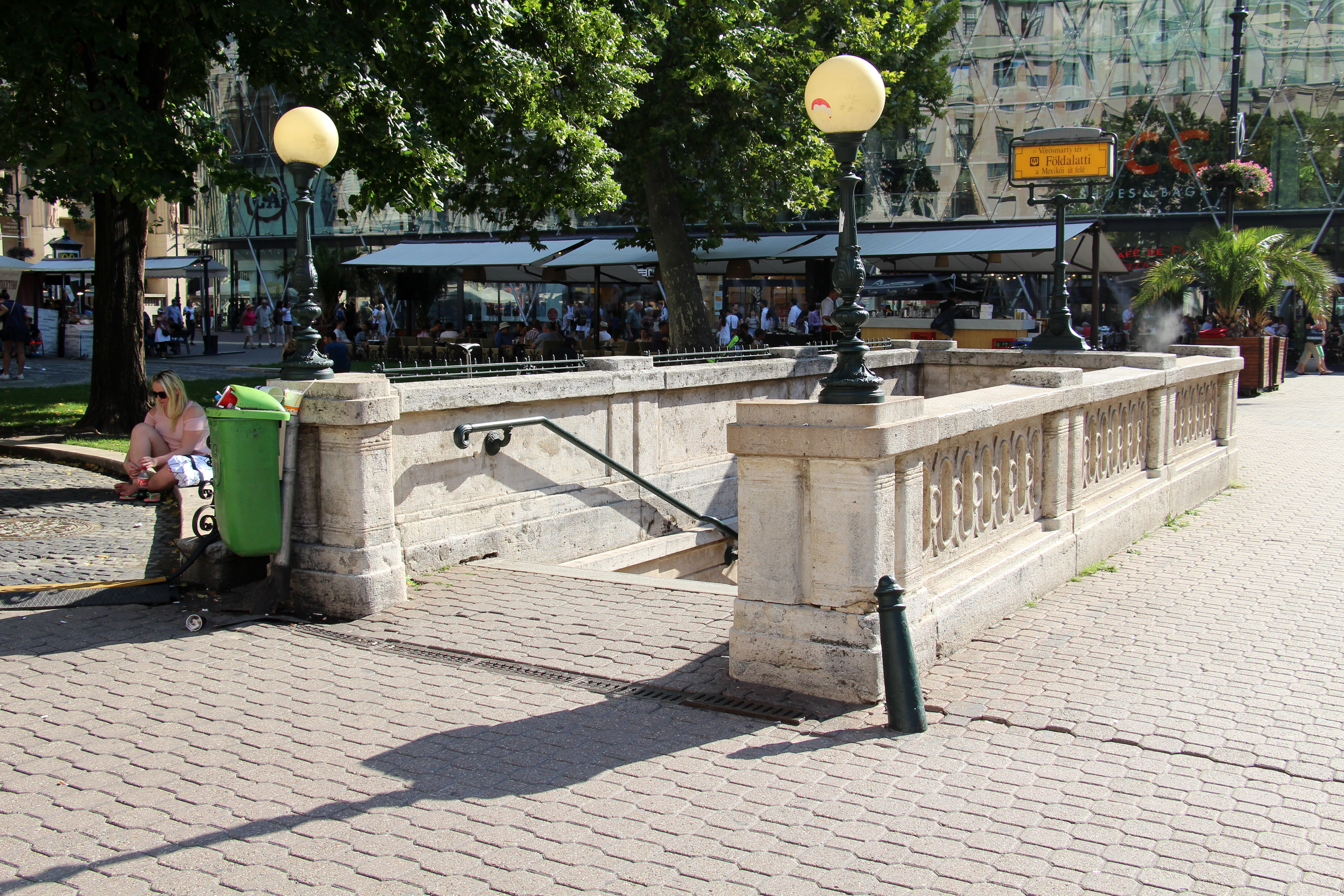
- Station entrance in Vörösmarty square

General information
- Location: Vörösmarty Square, Budapest; Hungary
- Coordinates: 47°29′48″N 19°03′01″E
- System: Budapest Metro station
- Platforms: 2 side platforms

Construction
- Structure type: cut-and-cover underground

History
- Opened: 2 May 1896
- Rebuilt: 1970

Services
Preceding station	Budapest Metro	Following station
Terminus	Line 1	Deák Ferenc tér towards Mexikói út
Location

Vörösmarty tér is the southern terminus of the yellow M1 (Millennium Underground) line of the Budapest Metro under Vörösmarty Square. It was formerly called Gizella tér station.

The station was opened on 2 May 1896 as part of the inaugural section of the Budapest Metro, between Vörösmarty tér and Széchenyi fürdő. This section, known as the Millennium Underground Railway, was the first metro system in continental Europe. In 2002, it was included into the World Heritage Site "Budapest, including the Banks of the Danube, the Buda Castle Quarter and Andrássy Avenue".

Vörösmarty tér has two side platforms, one serving each direction of travel, situated under the northern part of Vörösmarty square. Under the north-eastern corner of the square, the approach tracks describe a tight reverse curve in order to line up with Harmincad utca. To the west of the station, under Vigadó utca, are a pair of sidings. Arriving trains stop to set down passenger at the inbound platform, pull forward into one of the sidings to reverse, and then pick up passengers at the outbound platform.

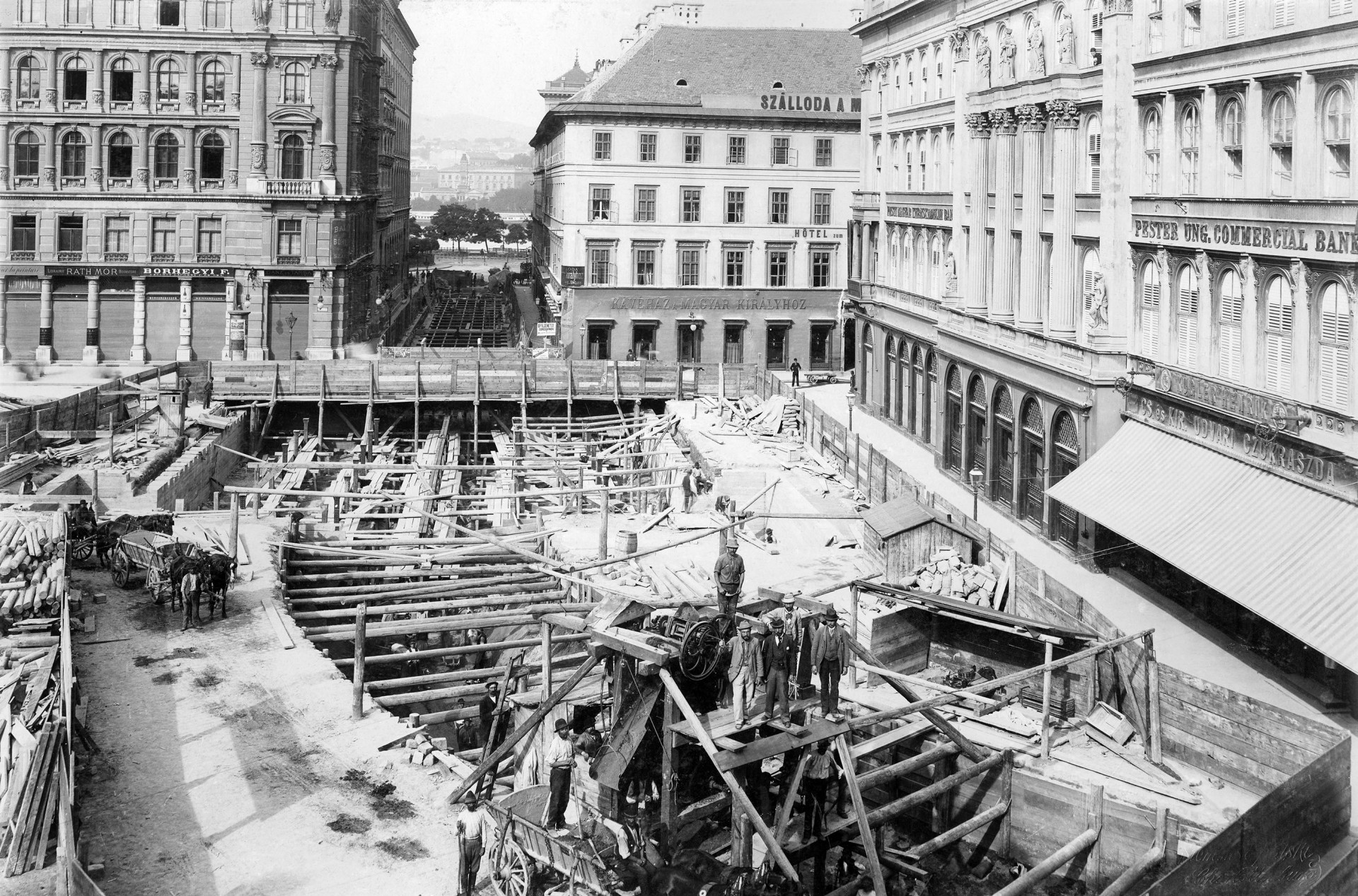
Construction of the station

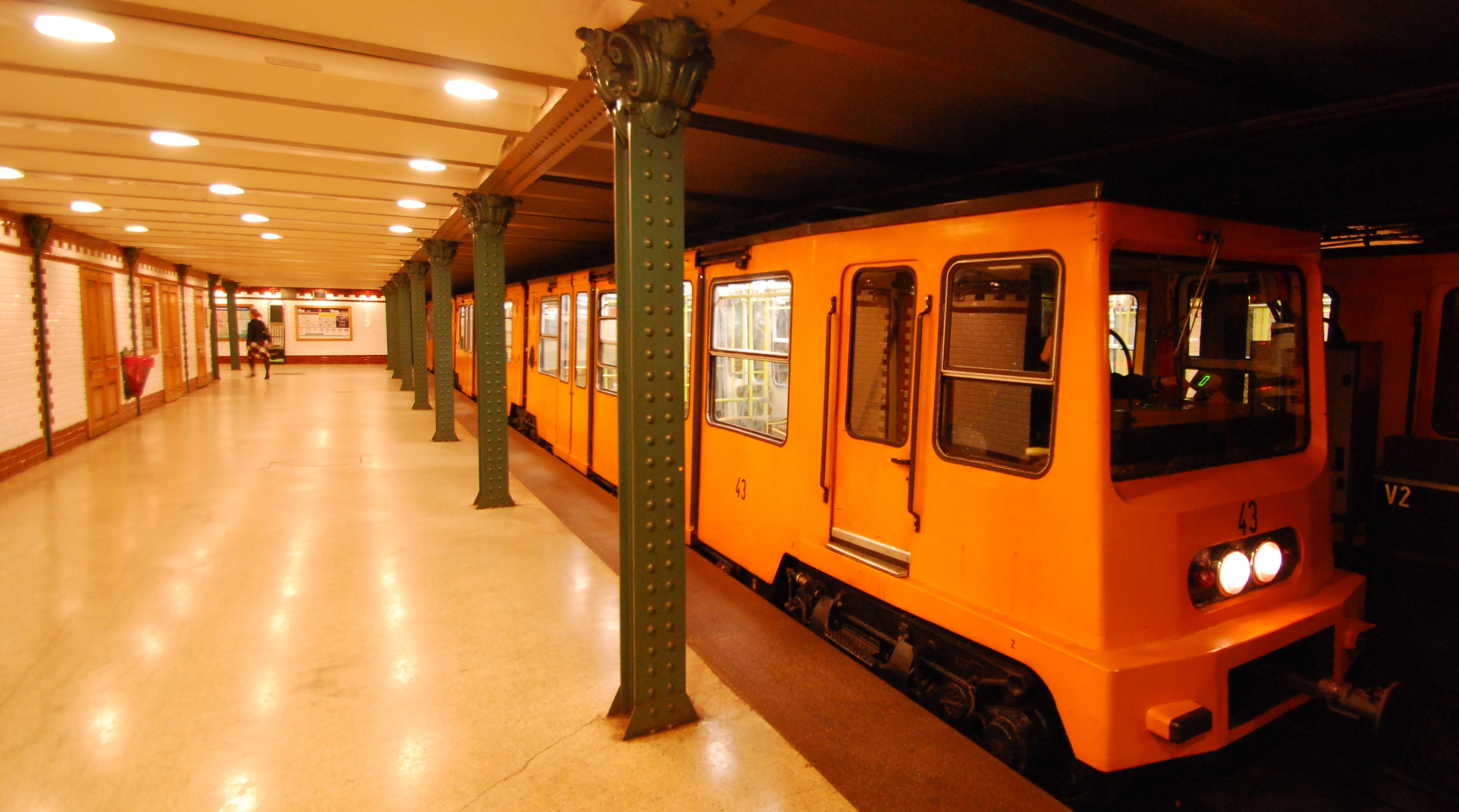
Train in the station platform

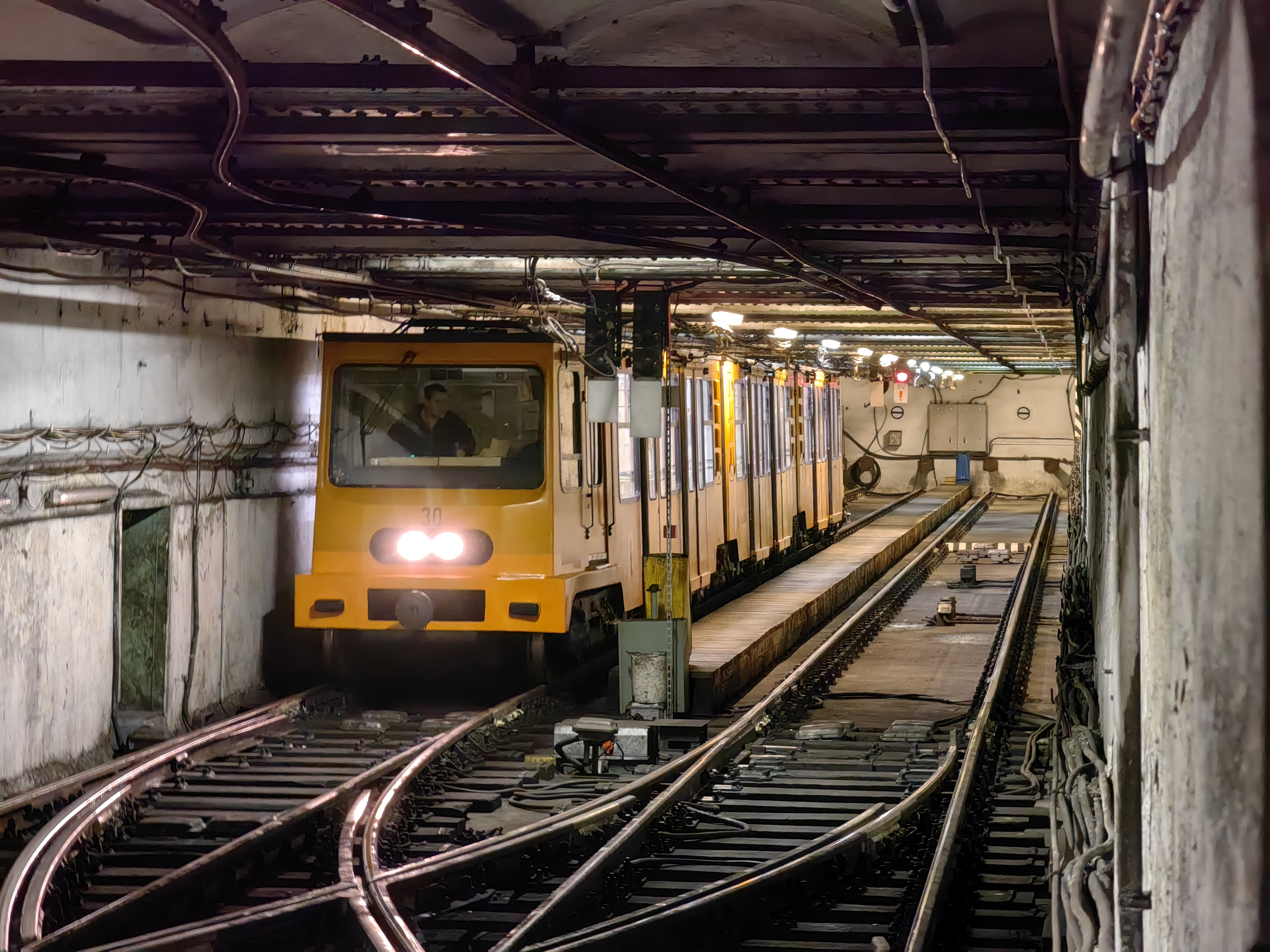
Train in the turnback sidings

== Connections ==
- Bus: 15
- Tram: 2, 2B, 23
