= Ganz MFAV =

Type of Hungarian metro car

Ganz MFAV (FAV, MillFAV, Mfav.)
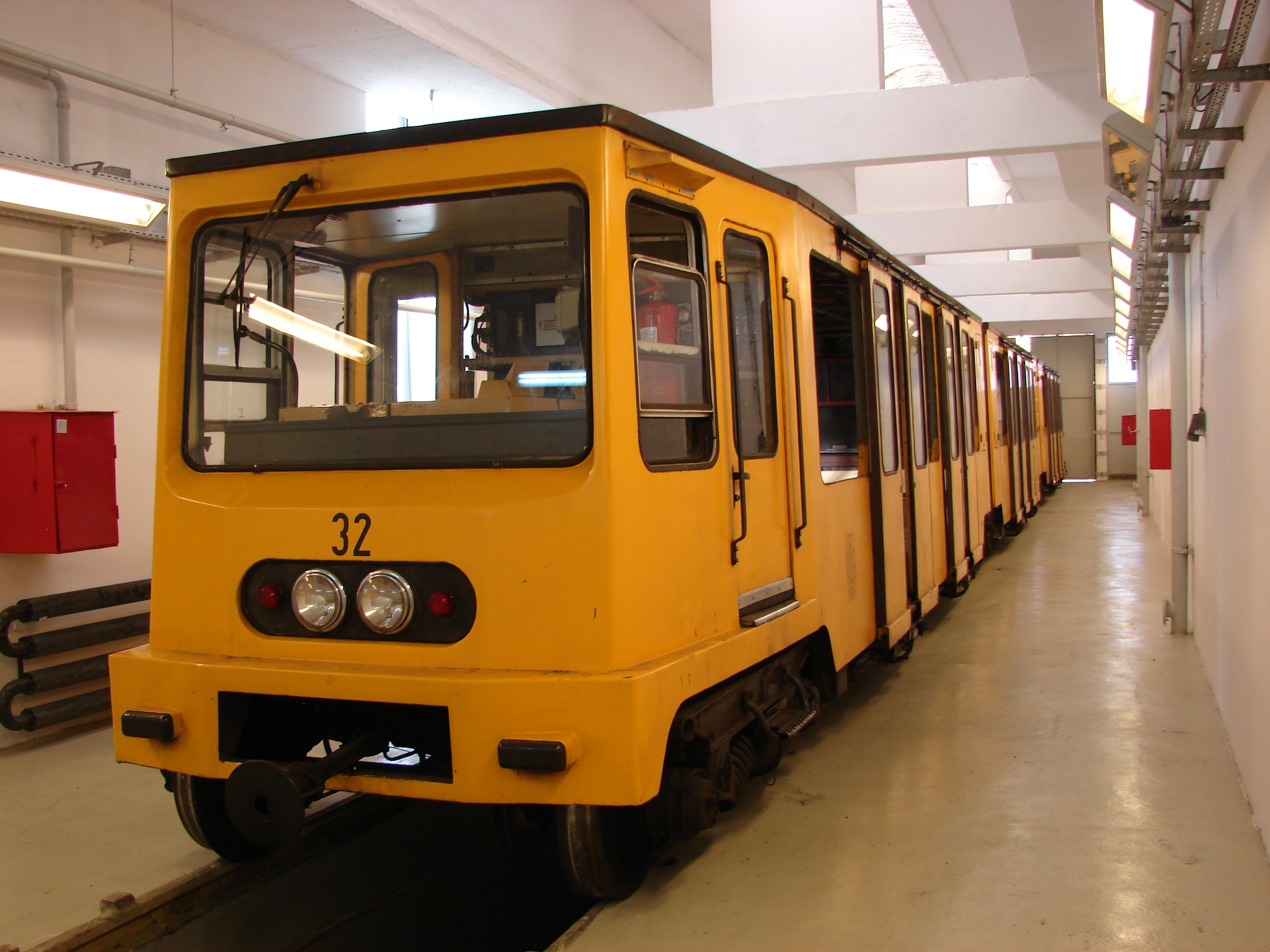
- MFAV motor coach no. 32 in the Mexikói Road depot in 2009

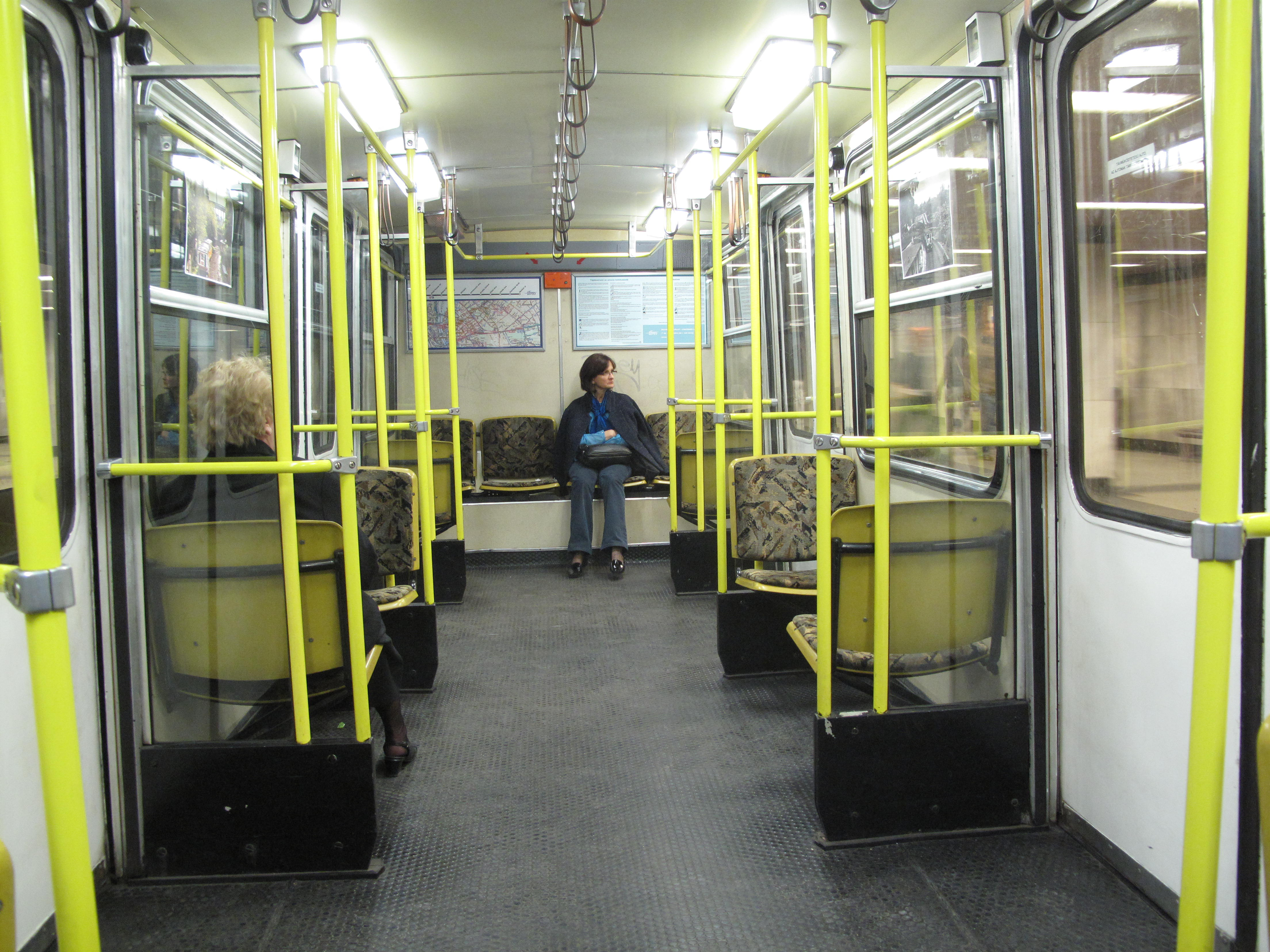
- Interior of an MFAV motor coach in 2011
- In service: 1973–present (52–53 years)
- Manufacturers: underframe, bogies and carbody: Ganz-MÁVAG Mozdony-, Vagon- és Gépgyár; Budapest, Hungary traction system: Ganz Villamossági Gyár; Budapest, Hungary
- Replaced: Schlick–Siemens & Halske motor coaches
- Constructed: prototypes: 1971 regular cars: 1971–1973, 1987
- Entered service: 1973 (53 years ago)
- Refurbished: 1995
- Number built: 23
- Number in service: 23
- Formation: MC (Note: MC stands for motor coach) only
- Fleet numbers: prototypes: 21–22 regular cars: 23–43
- Capacity: 189 passengers overall, (Note: assuming 5 passengers/m²); 48 seats
- Operators: Budapesti Közlekedési Vállalat (BKV), Budapest, Hungary (1973–now)
- Depot: Mexikói Road depot
- Line served: M1 metro line, Budapest

Specifications
- Car body construction: Steel
- Car length: carbody: 29,560 mm (97 ft 0 in) between couplers: 30,370 mm (99 ft 8 in)
- Width: 2,350 mm (7 ft 9 in)
- Height: 2,590 mm (8 ft 6 in)
- Floor height: 470 mm (1 ft 7 in)
- Entry: level
- Doors: sliding doors 6 per side, 2-2-2-2-2-2
- Articulated sections: two
- Wheel diameter: 670 mm (2 ft 2 in)
- Wheelbase: 1,600 mm (5 ft 3 in), 1,800 mm (5 ft 11 in)
- Maximum speed: 50 km/h (31 mph)(current); 60 km/h (37 mph)(original)
- Weight: 36,960 kg (40.74 short tons)
- Axle load: 8,650 kg (9.53 short tons)
- Traction system: 4 × Ganz TK 44A
- Power output: 4 × 66.5 kW (89.1 hp) (=266 kW (357 hp))
- Auxiliaries: 24 V DC
- Electric system: 600 V DC from overhead line
- Current collection: electropneumatically operated pantograph
- UIC classification: 2'Bo'Bo'2'tr (Note: the UIC axle arrangement classification appendix "tr" officially denotes a tram vehicle)
- Bogies: pivoting
- Braking systems: electric brakes, Knorr-Bremse BH air brakes
- Safety system: train event recorder
- Coupling system: mechanical: Alemann-type trichterkupplung
- Multiple working: no
- Track gauge: 1,435 mm (4 ft 8 1/2 in)

The Ganz MFAV (Hungarian: [ˈɡɒnz ˈɛmfɒv]), known in official BKV records as Mfav., and alternatively known as FAV, (Note: FAV: [fɒv]) or MillFAV, (Note: MillFAV: [ˈmilfɒv]) is a type of metro car which was manufactured by Hungarian companies Ganz-MÁVAG Mozdony-, Vagon- és Gépgyár ("Ganz-MÁVAG Locomotive, Carriage and Machine Factory") and Ganz Villamossági Gyár ("Ganz Electric Factory"). The MFAV metro cars are articulated, 8-axle rail motor coaches with an unusual 2'Bo'Bo'2'tr axle arrangement. They are not capable of operating as electric multiple units. The cars were manufactured in Budapest between 1971 and 1973 and in 1987, and including the two prototype cars, in overall 23 units were made.

The MFAV designation resolves to Millenniumi Földalatti Vasút ("Millennial Underground Railway"), FAV and MillFAV refers to the same phrase, as the cars were specifically designed to replace the original, turn-of-century Schlick–Siemens & Halske rolling stock of Budapest's M1 metro line, a tunnel system which requires low-height vehicles. MFAV metro cars are still in active service, although their retirement has been called for. The first car entered passenger service in 1973, thus the type is now in continuous service for 52–53 years. The series carries the distinction of being an early example of fully low-floor urban rail vehicles.

== Design and manufacturing ==
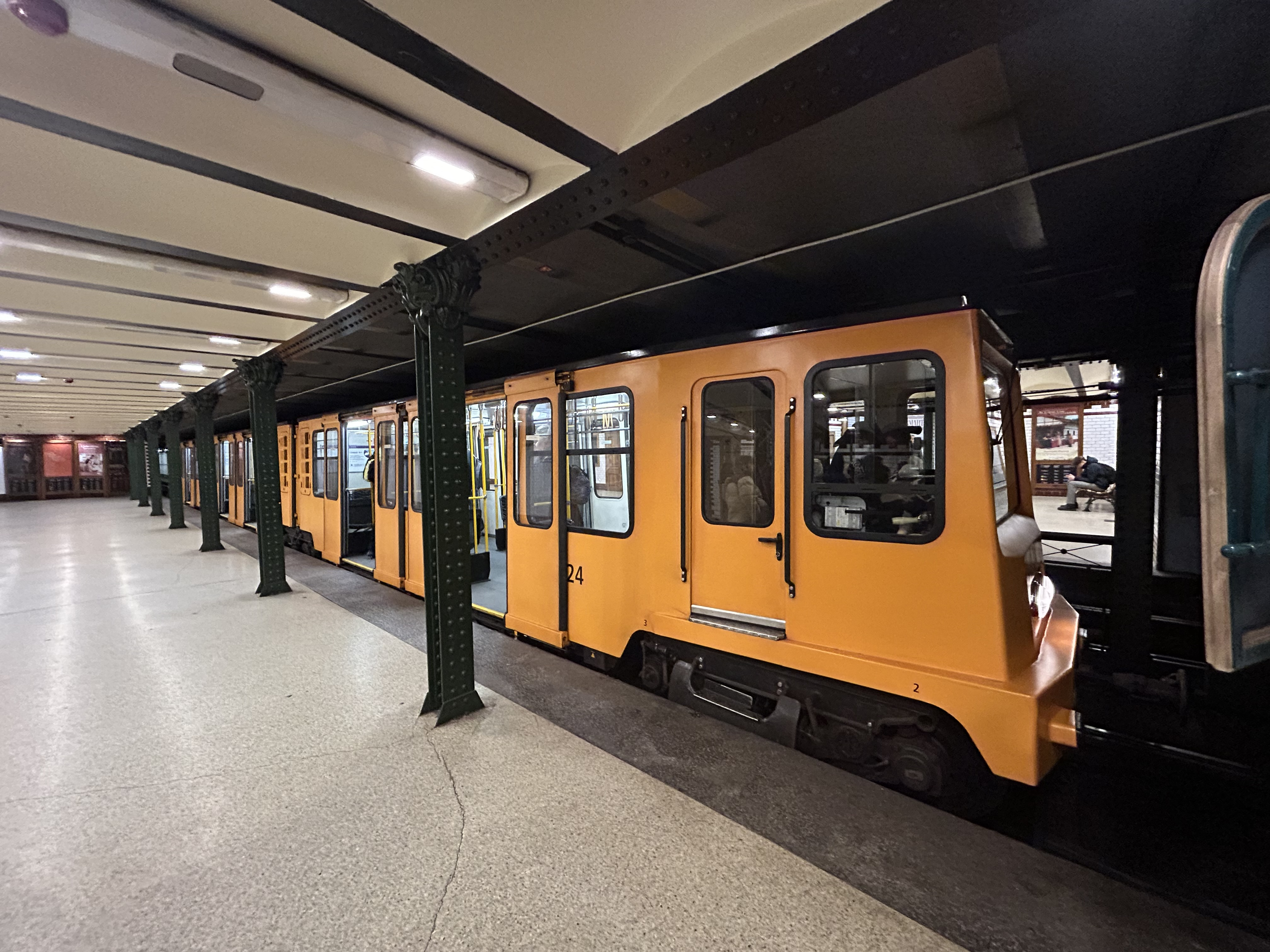
A MFAV of first batch (no. 24).

The MFAV cars are partly based on the CSMG tramcars, but the geometrical constraints of the M1 metro line forced Ganz to modify the existing design in unique ways, such as placing the electrical equipment above the articulations between the body sections to achieve a fully low-floor passenger area. Of the four bogies, the two inner Jacobs bogies are powered, while the two outer bogies are unpowered.

MFAV metro cars were produced in two main production periods, in 1971–1973 and 1987, with two prototype cars built in 1971.

Production run	Production years	Production numbers	Fleet numbers	Notes
MFAV prototypes	1971	2	21–22	
MFAV first batch	1971–1973	19	23–41	
MFAV second batch	1987	2	42–43	originally 4 were planned

== See also ==
- Ganz CSMG
- Budapest Metro
- Ganz Works
- Articulated vehicle
