= Oktogon (intersection) =

Intersection in Pest, Hungary

Coordinates: 47°30′18.98″N 19°3′48.23″E

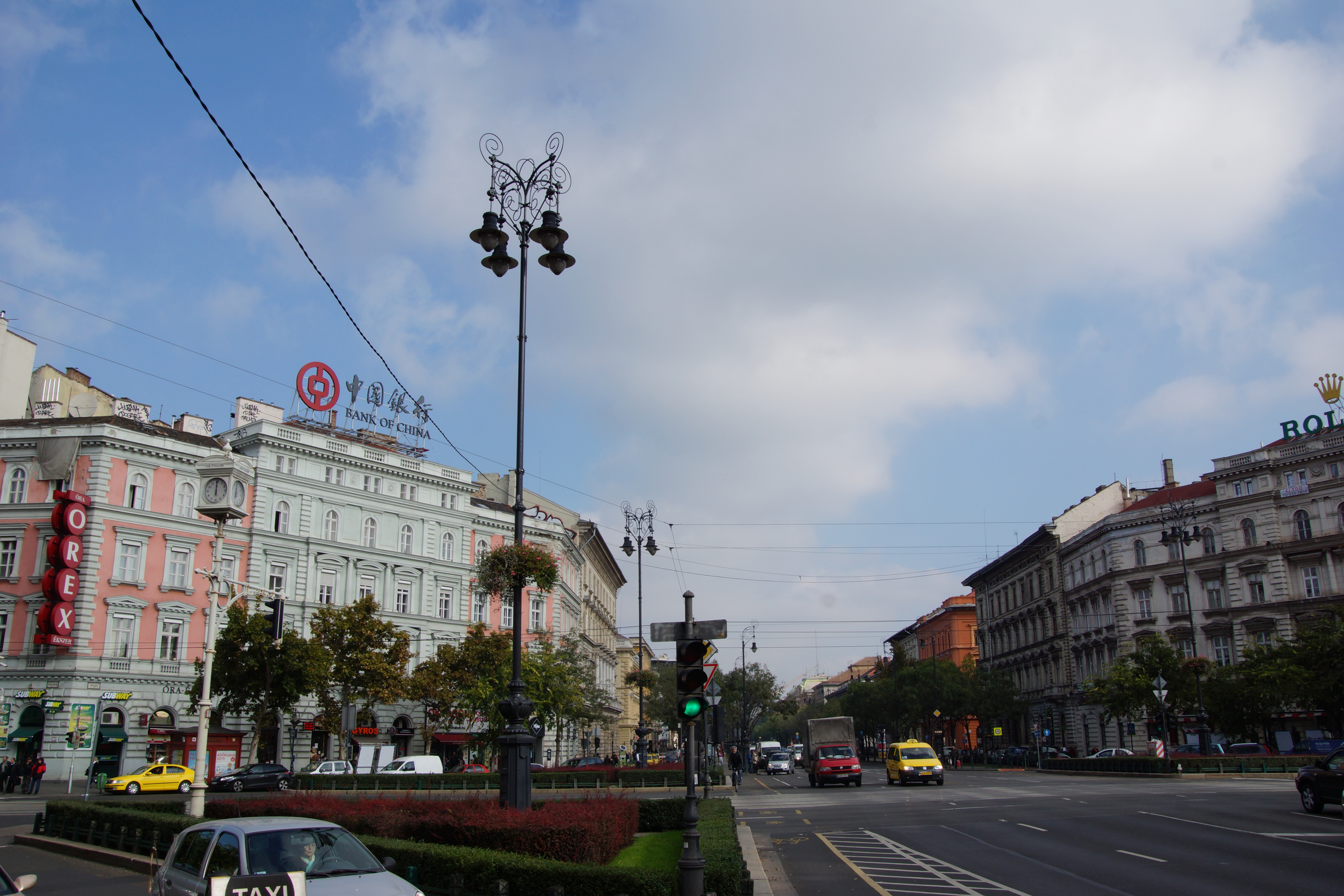
Oktogon, 2014

Oktogon is one of Pest's major intersections, located at the junction of the Grand Boulevard (Nagykörút) and Andrássy Avenue (Andrássy út) in Budapest, Hungary. This junction, one of the city's most important, is named for its octagonal shape.

Oktogon is also a station on the yellow M1 (Millennium Underground) line of the Budapest Metro, which runs underneath Andrássy Avenue to Heroes' Square (Hősök tere).

== History ==
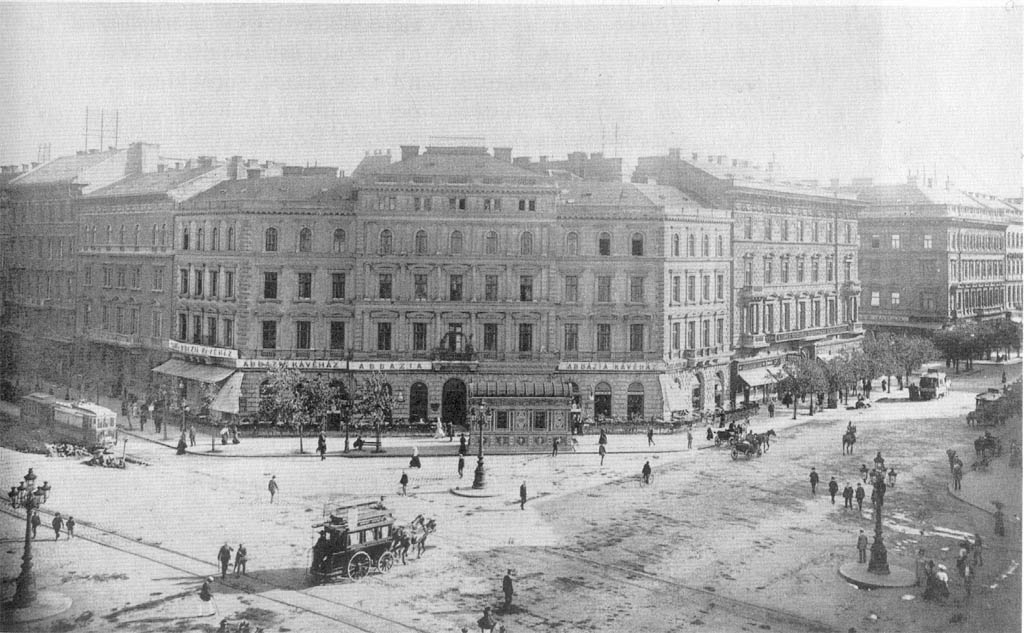
Historic photo of Oktogon around 1900, overlooking Abbázia Kávéház

Prior to the construction of Andrássy Avenue in 1871, there was a large hole at the site, which was then filled in. The next two years saw the construction of the four large eclectic buildings surrounding the intersection, built according to plans of architect Antal Szkalnitzky.

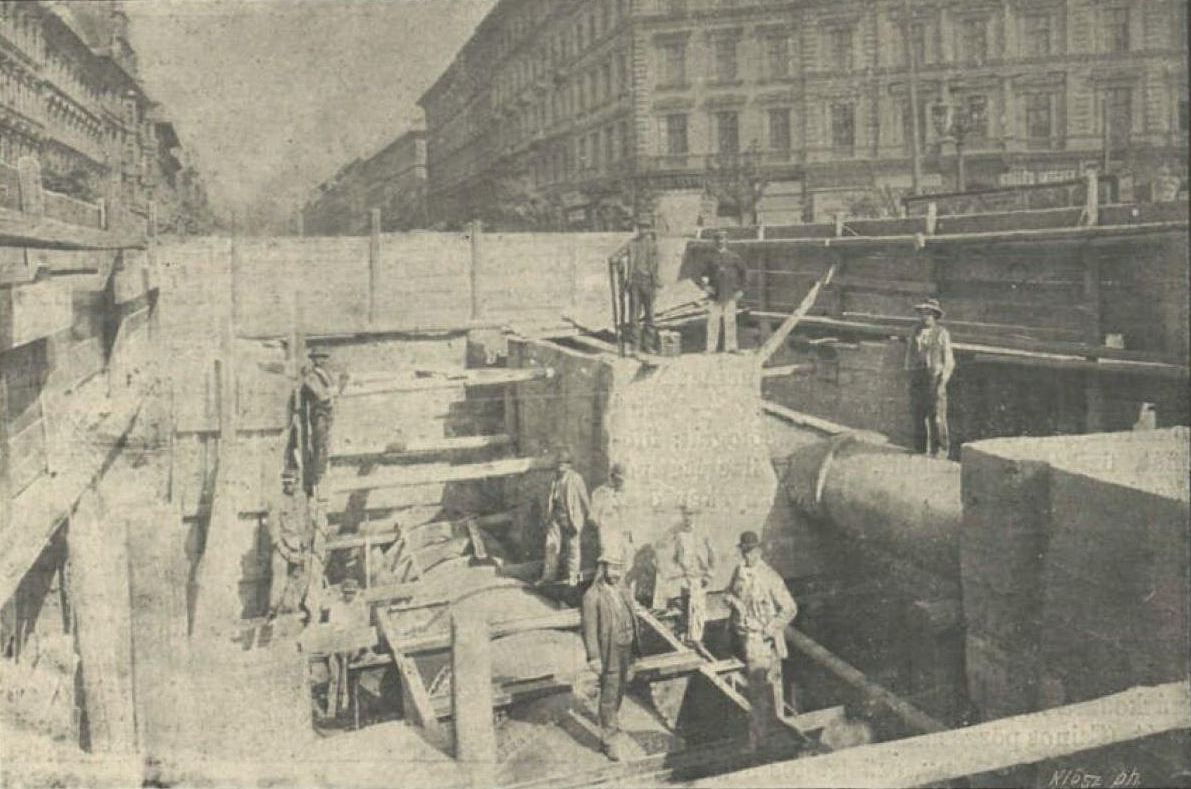
Construction of the Millennium Underground (1896)

The intersection was again under significant construction in 1894–1896 as part of the Millennium Underground construction project, built under Andrássy Avenue using the cut-and-cover method.

Oktogon has had numerous names: from 1936 to 1945, it was renamed Mussolini Square, then between 1945 and 1990 it was known as November 7 Square. Since then it has regained its original name. Oktogon and its famous cafés play a central role in Vilmos Kondor's 2012 novel Budapest Noir.
