= Metro Line M1 (Budapest Metro) =

Rapid transit line in Budapest, Hungary

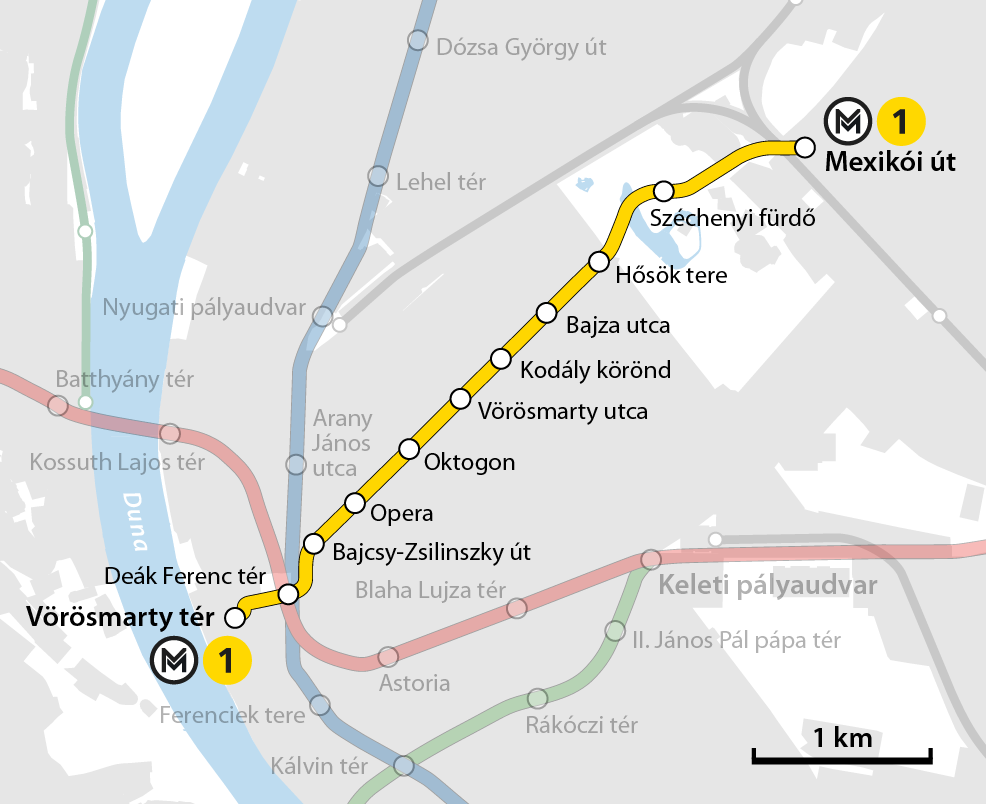

Overview
- Status: Operational
- Line number: Line 1 ("Yellow metro")
- Termini: Vörösmarty tér; Mexikói út
- Stations: 11

Service
- Type: Rapid transit
- System: Budapest Metro
- Operator: BKK
- Rolling stock: Ganz MFAV

History
- Opened: 2 May 1896; 130 years ago
- Last extension: 1973

Technical
- Line length: 4.4 km
- Track gauge: 1,435 mm (4 ft 8 1/2 in)
- Electrification: 550 V DC
- Operating speed: 60 km/h

UNESCO World Heritage Site
- Criteria: Cultural: (ii), (iv)
- Designated: 2002 (as the extension of the site designated in 1987)
- Part of: Budapest, including the Banks of the Danube, the Buda Castle Quarter and Andrássy Avenue
- Reference no.: 400bis
- UNESCO region: Europe
Route map
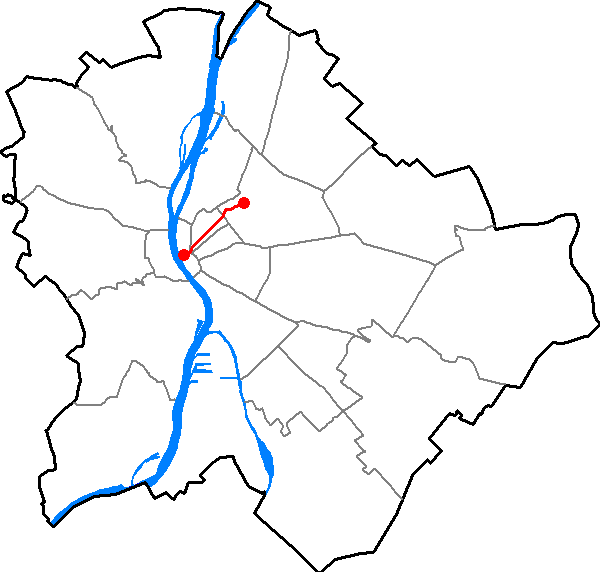

Line 1 (Officially: Millennium Underground Railway, Metro 1 or M1) is the oldest line of the Budapest Metro, built from 1894 to 1896. It is known locally as "the small underground" ("a kisföldalatti"), while the M2, M3 and M4 are called "metró". It was the first electrified underground on the European mainland, and the world's second oldest electrified underground after the London Underground. It was finished by April 1896 and was inaugurated by the emperor of Austria-Hungary, Franz Joseph, on 3 May 1896.

Line 1 runs northeast from the city center on the Pest side under Andrássy út to the Városliget, or City Park. Like Line 3, it does not serve Buda. Its daily ridership is estimated at 80,000.

== History ==
=== The original line in 1896 ===
Line 1 is the oldest of the metro lines in Budapest, having been in constant operation since 1896. The line was inaugurated on 2 May 1896, the year of the millennium (the thousandth anniversary of the arrival of the Magyars), by emperor Franz Joseph. The original name of the operator company was "Franz Joseph Underground Electric Railway Company" ("Ferenc József Földalatti Villamos Vasút Rt.").

The original purpose of the first metro line was to facilitate transport to the Városliget (City Park) along the elegant Andrássy Avenue without building surface transport affecting the streetscape. The National Assembly accepted the metro plan in 1870, and the local Hungarian subsidiary company of the Siemens & Halske AG was commissioned for the construction, starting in 1894. It took 2,000 workers using up-to-date machinery less than two years to complete. The underground part of this section was built entirely from the surface (with the cut-and-cover method).

The line ran underneath Andrássy Avenue, from Gizella tér station (now Vörösmarty tér station) to Aréna út station (now Hősök tere station). From there it followed an indirect surface alignment through the Városliget to a surface terminus at Artézi fürdő station (now Széchenyi fürdő station). It had eleven stations, nine underground and two on the surface section through the park. The length of the line was 3.7 kilometres (2.3 mi) at that time; trains ran every two minutes. It was able to carry as many as 35,000 people a day (by contrast, today 103,000 people travel on it on a workday).

=== Diversion at Deák Ferenc tér in the 1950s ===
In the 1950s and in prepararation for the planned second line of the metro, the route of the line under Deák Ferenc square was diverted in order to ease the sharp curve that had been dictated by the original layout of the square. The diversion left an 80 metres (262 ft 6 in) long section of the original tunnel empty and walled off, a state it was left in for some twenty years.

=== Extension and reconstruction in the 1970s ===
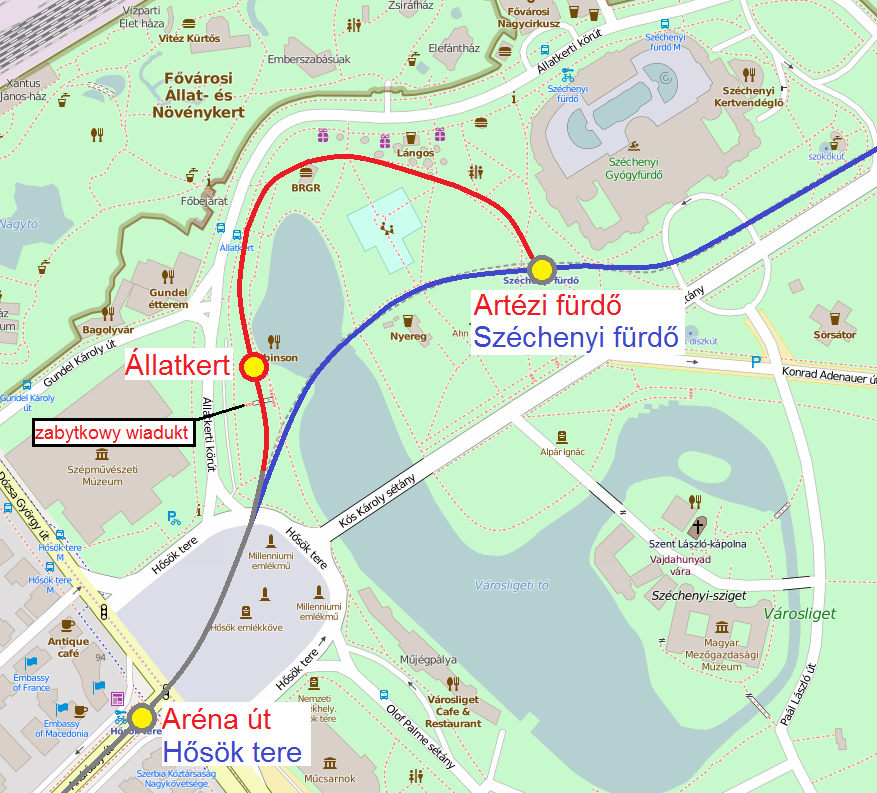
Map of the 1973 diversion

Between 1970 and 1973 the line underwent an extension and reconstruction of some sections. The most significant was the extension to Mexikói út. This involved the closure of the surface alignment through the Városliget, including both Állatkert and Széchenyi fürdő surface stations. In its place a new underground alignment was adopted, passing below the Városliget and serving a new underground through station at Széchenyi fürdő. Állatkert station was not replaced.

At the same time Deák Ferenc tér station was rebuilt to connect with the M2 line, and the rolling stock was changed to Ganz MFAV multiple units, which still operate on the line, and the line’s left-hand traffic was changed into right-hand traffic. In line with the rebuilding of Deák Ferenc tér station, the section of tunnel abandoned some 20 years earlier was rebuilt to house the Underground Railway Museum, with access from the new station concourse.

=== Renovation in 1995 ===
During the past hundred years, none of the renovations touched the tunnel section under Andrássy út. As a result, the infrastructure of the tunnel (the masonry, the load-bearing steel structures, the water insulation, the railway tracks, the architecture of the stations) has been mostly unchanged. From the middle of the 1980s, they started to show their age, and the serious damage and wear and tear prompted the necessity and urgency of a reconstruction. Renovation works took place during a planned closure between 15 and 18 September 1995.

=== Possible extension to Rákosrendező ===
As part of a new luxury development project at the Rákosrendező railway station, known as "Millenium City Center" or "Maxi-Dubai", the M1 line would be extended north from the current terminus at Mexikói út to provide better transportation links to the new site. It would serve brand-new apartments, office buildings, commercial properties, and what János Lázár, Hungary's Minister of Construction and Investment, labeled "Budapest's largest and most modern public park." It would also include a renovation of the existing railway station as well as a new pedestrian & cycle path to make it easier to access the new development center.

== Rolling stock ==
Due to the line’s small loading gauge, the line has used very small vehicles since its inception with low-floor passenger sections and high-floor cabs. The line has always been powered by overhead lines, possibly rigid. The voltage has variously been described as either 550 or 600 volts, but the exact voltage is unclear.

=== From 1896 to 1973 ===
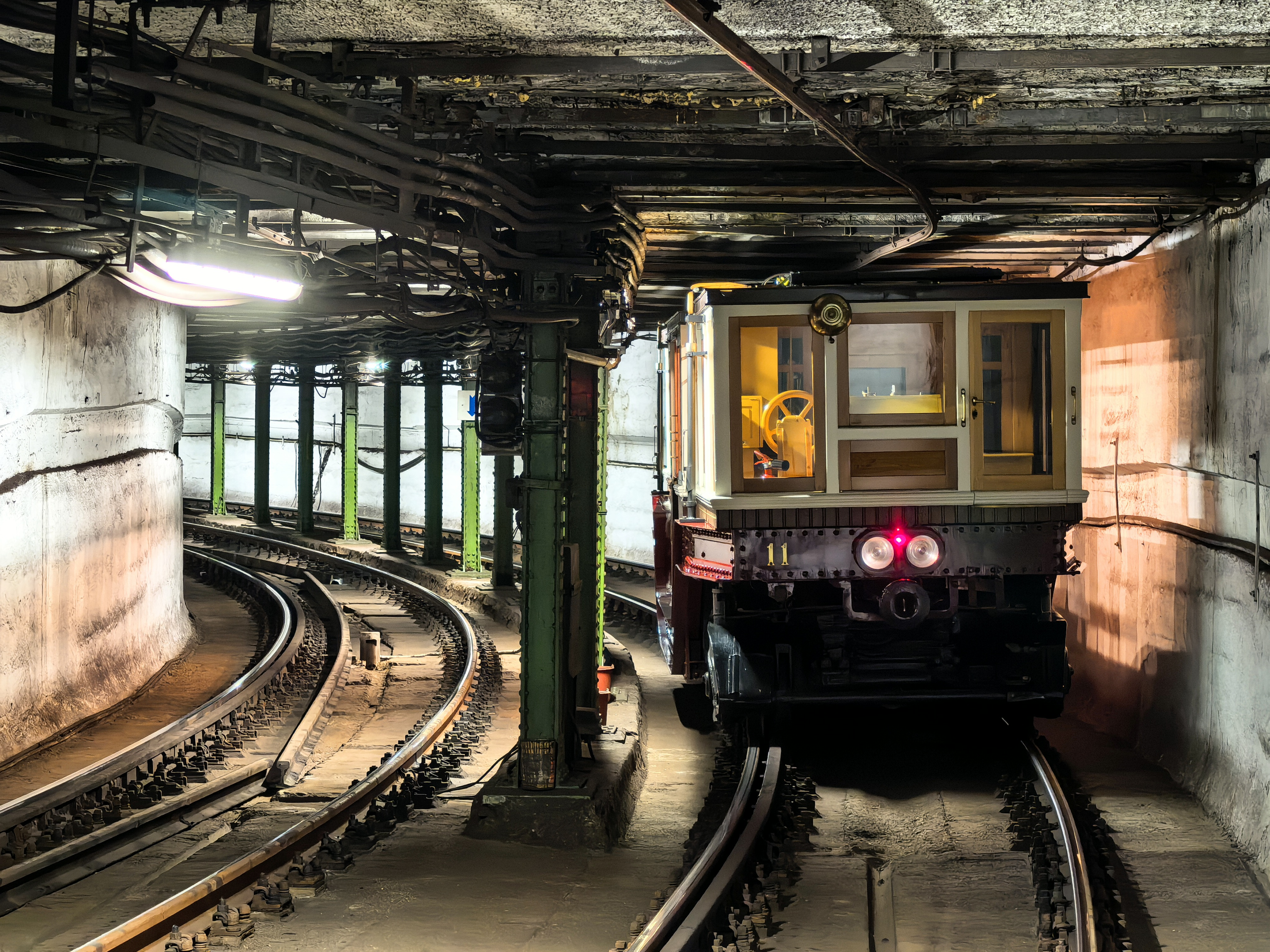
Original rolling stock in special service

The line opened with 20 electrically powered motor cars built by the Hungarian subsidiary of Siemens and Halske. Cars 1 to 10 were panelled in sheet metal, whilst cars 11 to 19 were wood panelled, and No. 20 was a special design “Emperor’s Car”. Because of the low headroom available in the line's tunnels, the cars had an extremely low profile, and the operator had to squeeze into a very tight cab. The cars had drop centres for the doors a single pocket door on each side, and the seats were above the trucks. The cars could reach a top speed of 17 miles per hour (27.4 km/h).

As originally built, the motor cars ran singly. But in 1959 to 1960, 16 four-wheel control trailers were built to run with them and provide extra capacity.

The cars, both motor and trailer, were retired from normal service by 1973. One of the original wood panelled cars is maintained in working order and is occasionally used on special services. One of each of the metal and wood panelled cars, and one of the trailers, are exhibited in the Underground Railway Museum, itself fashioned from the original Deák Ferenc tér station. Other cars have been preserved elsewhere, including one at the Seashore Trolley Museum at Kennebunkport in the US state of Maine.

=== From 1971 to present ===
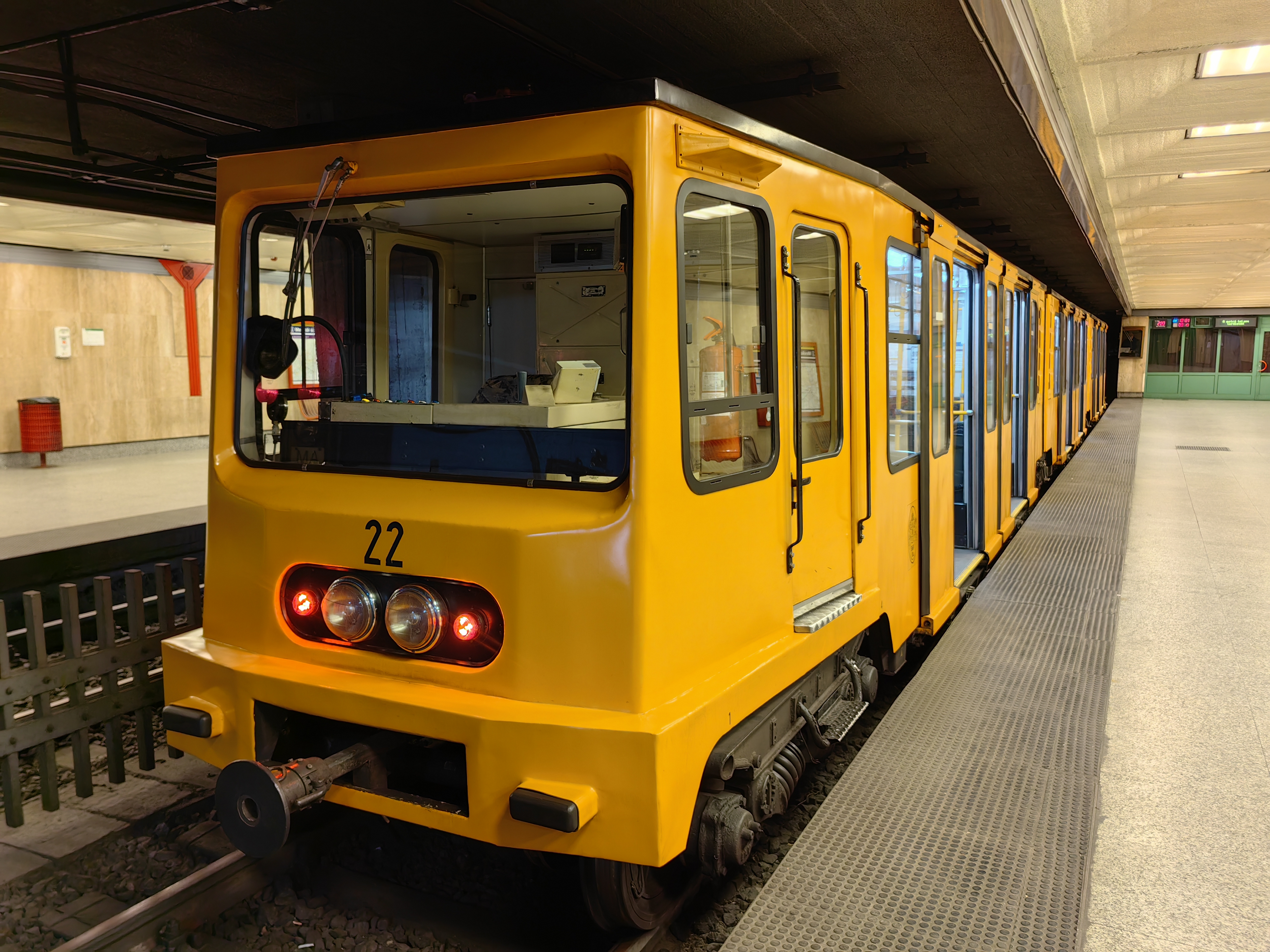
Ganz MFAV car at Mexikói út

With the extension and reconstruction of the line in the 1970s, new Ganz MFAV cars were built in Budapest by Ganz Works to replace the original rolling stock. These cars are eight-axle articulated vehicles. Each unit has 3 sections, each having 2 doors per side, with no internal connection between. The driver’s cabs are located above the end bogies and can only be entered from a small door on each side. The loading gauge constraints of the line meant that all electrical subsystems are fitted above the articulations, between the separate passenger compartments.

In total 23 cars were built, comprising two prototypes in 1971, 19 production cars in 1971 to 1973, and two further cars in 1987 although originally two more were to be purchased at this time. All are still in service.

== Stations and connections ==
(Vörösmarty tér – Mexikói út)
Travel Time minutes	Station	Travel Time minutes	Connection	Buildings / Monuments
0	Vörösmarty tér	11	2, 2B, 23; 15	Vigadó, Café Gerbeaud, Ministry of Finance
1	Deák Ferenc tér	10	47, 48, 49; 72; 9, 16, 100E, 105, 178, 210, 210B, 216	Town Hall, Metro Museum (Földalatti Vasúti Múzeum)
2	Bajcsy–Zsilinszky út	9	72; 9, 105, 210, 210B	St. Stephen's Basilica
3	Opera	8	70, 78; 105, 210, 210B	Hungarian State Opera House
4	Oktogon	7	4, 6; 105, 210, 210B	Theaters (Operette, Mikroszkóp, Miklós Radnóti,...)
5	Vörösmarty utca	6	73, 76; 105, 210, 210B	House of Terror
6	Kodály körönd	5	105, 210, 210B	
7	Bajza utca	4	105, 210, 210B	
8	Hősök tere	3	72, 75, 79; 20E, 30, 30A, 105, 210, 210B, 230	Museum of Fine Arts, Műcsarnok (Hall of Exhibitions), Városliget (City Park), Hősök tere (Heroes square)
9	Széchenyi fürdő	2	72	Széchenyi thermal bath, Zoo and Botanical Garden
11	Mexikói út	0	1, 1M, 3, 69; 74, 74A, 82; 25, 32, 225	

== Gallery about archives ==
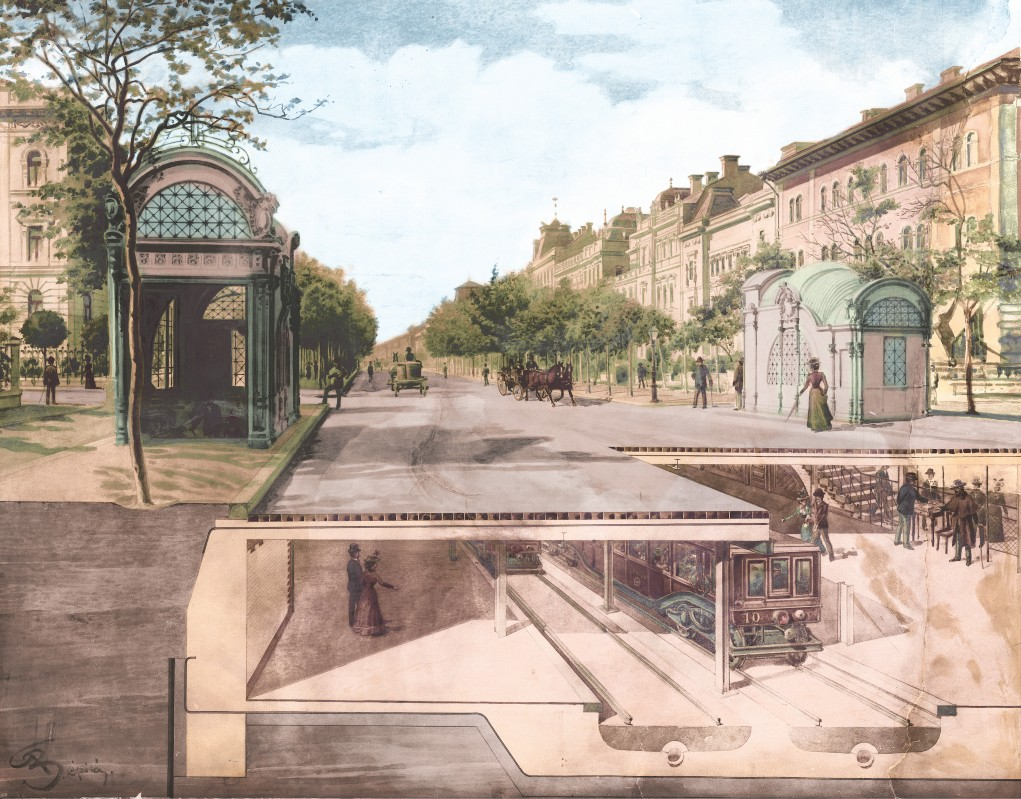
Andrássy Avenue with the Millennium Underground (1896)

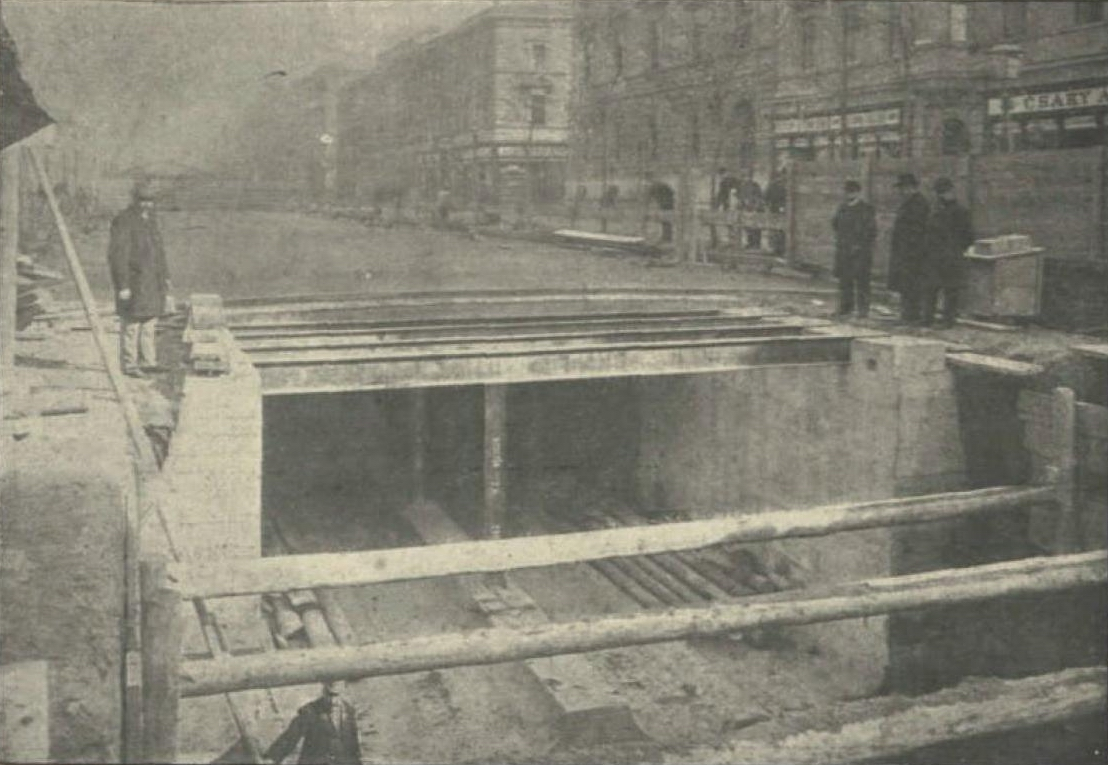
Completing the cut-and-cover construction

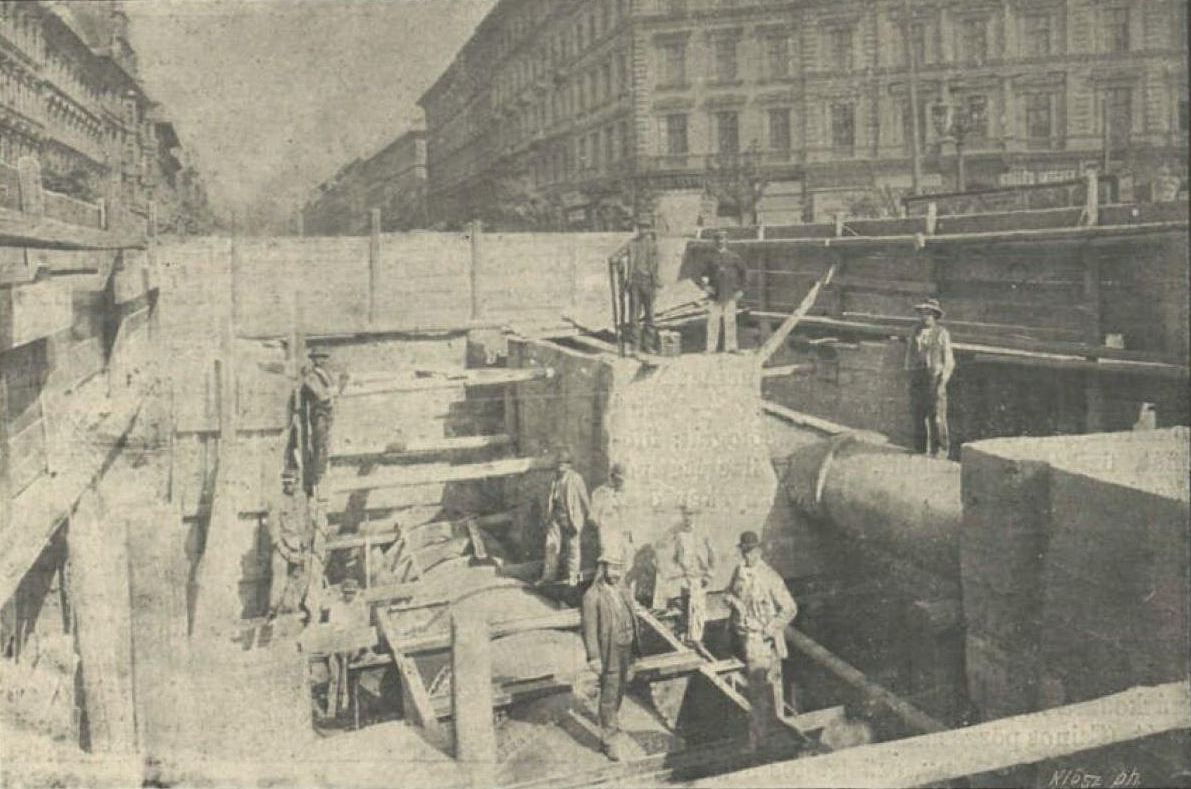
Line under construction at Oktogon

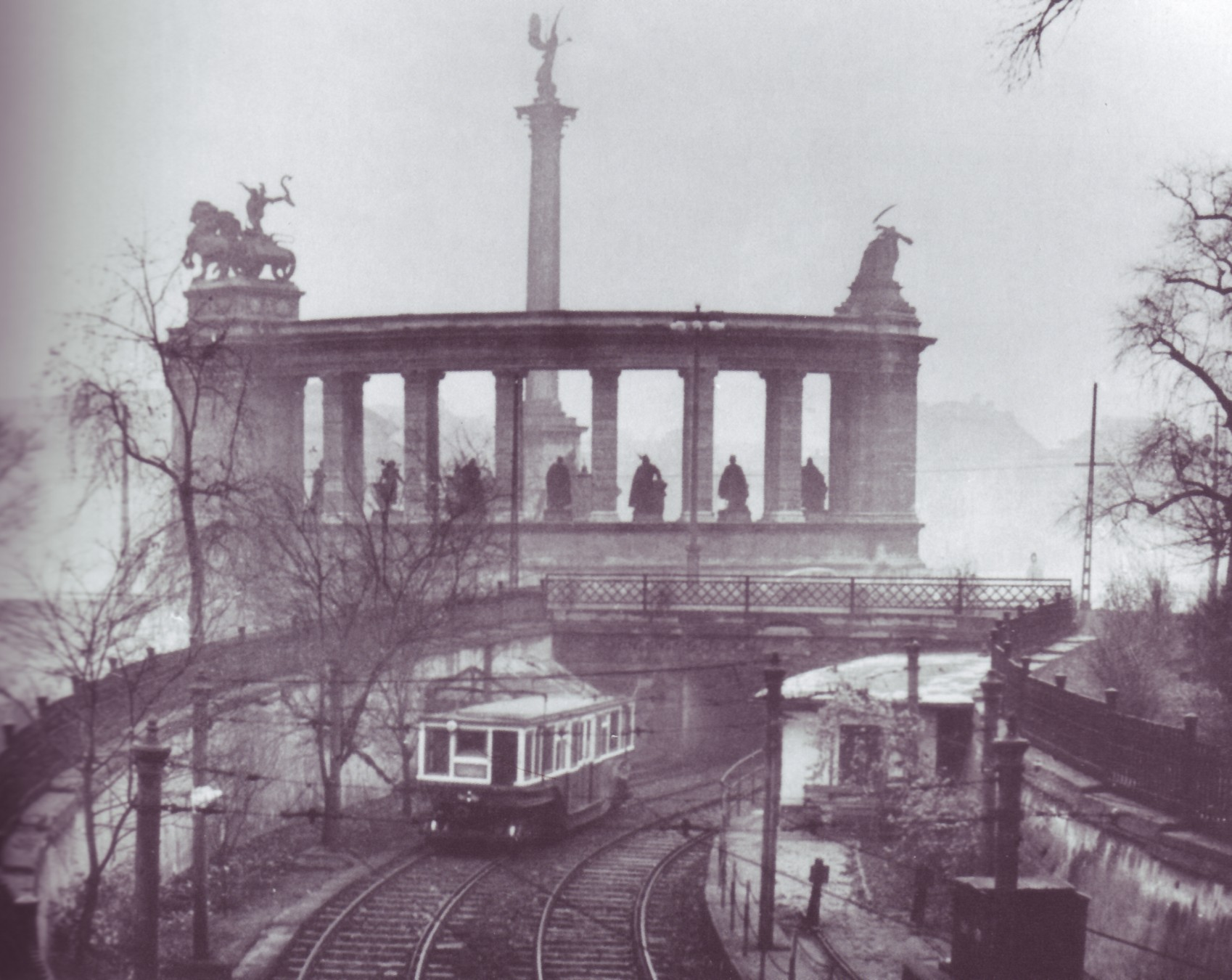
A train near the Hősök tere (before 1973)

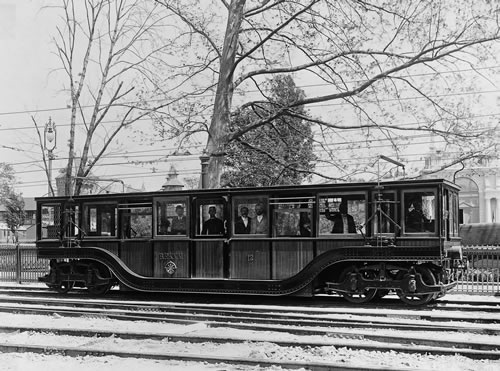
Original rolling stock

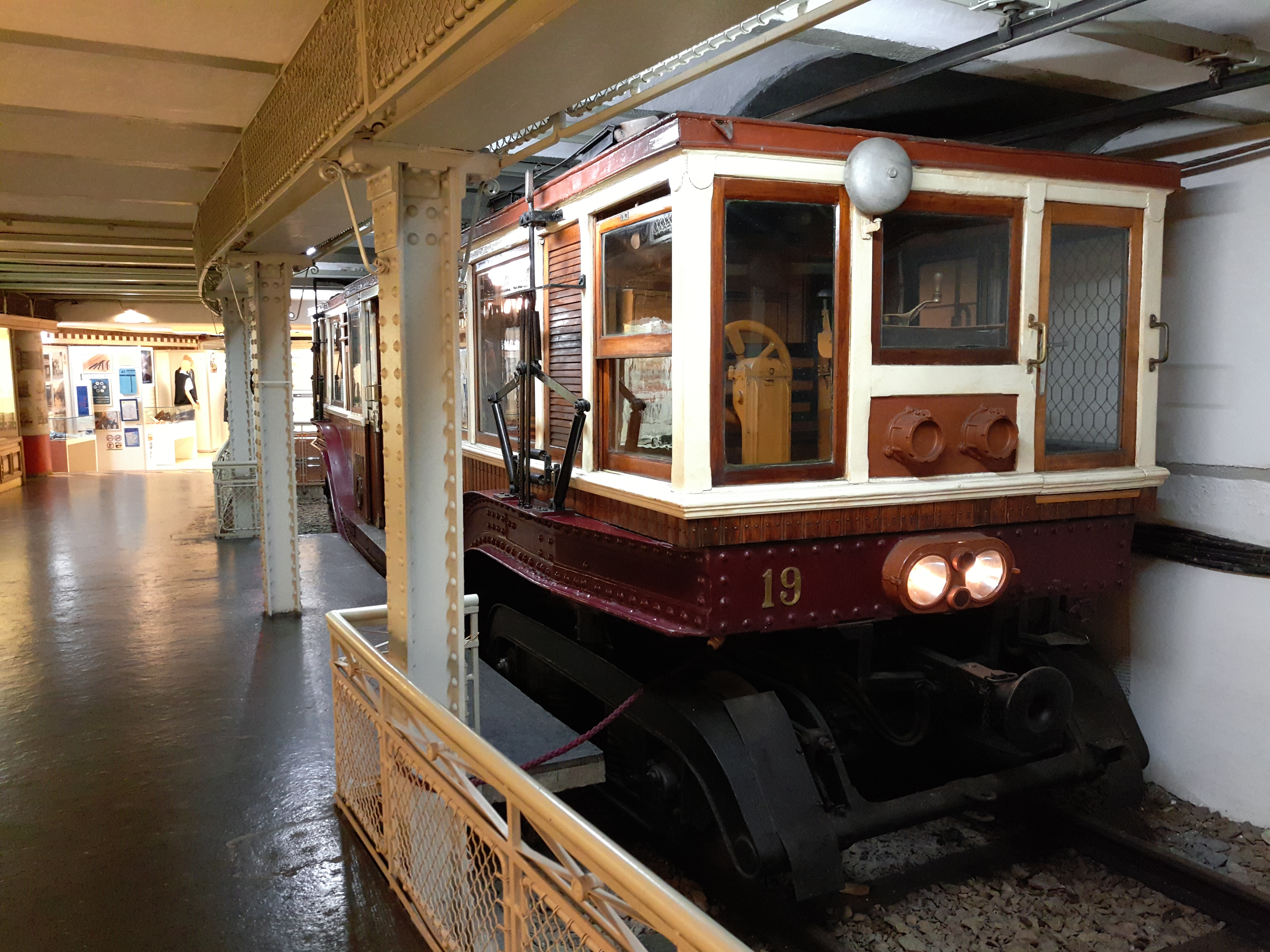
Preserved heritage rolling stock at the museum

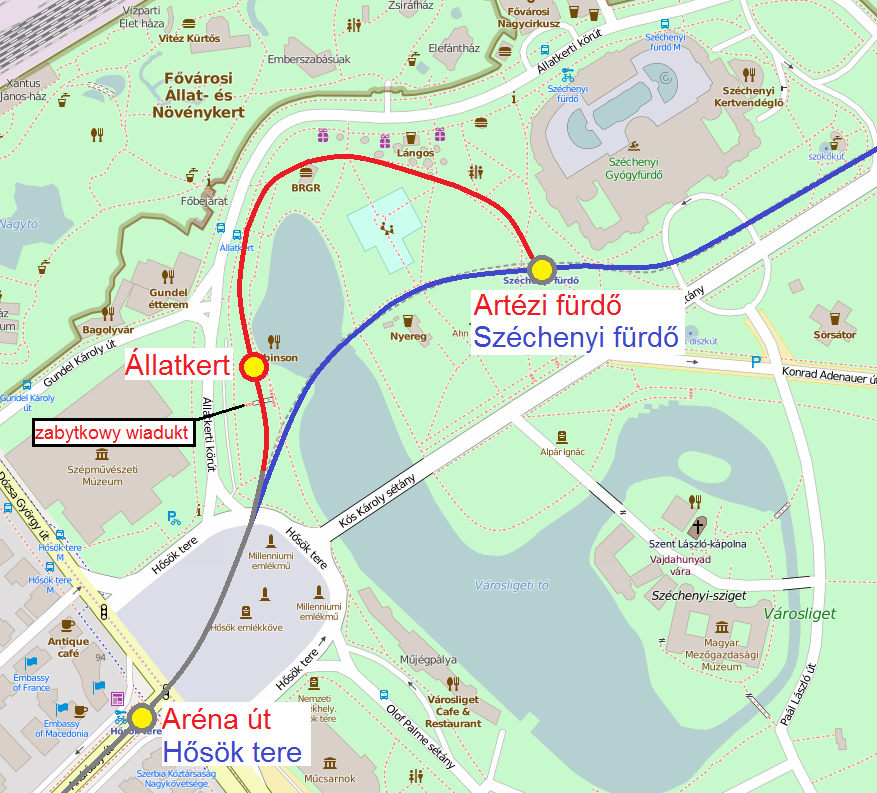
Old and new route map of M1 in City Park

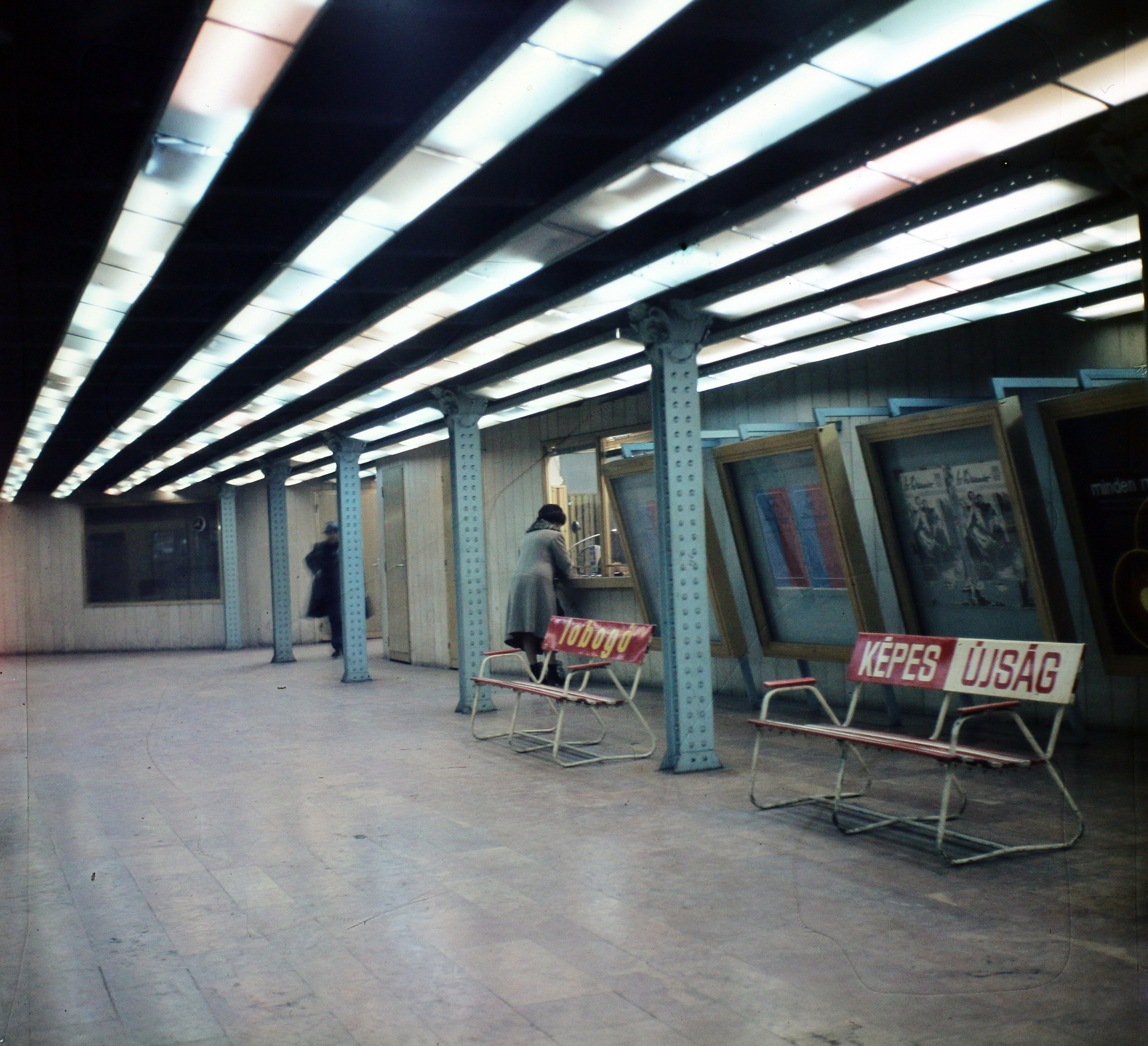
Vörösmarty tér during the socialist era

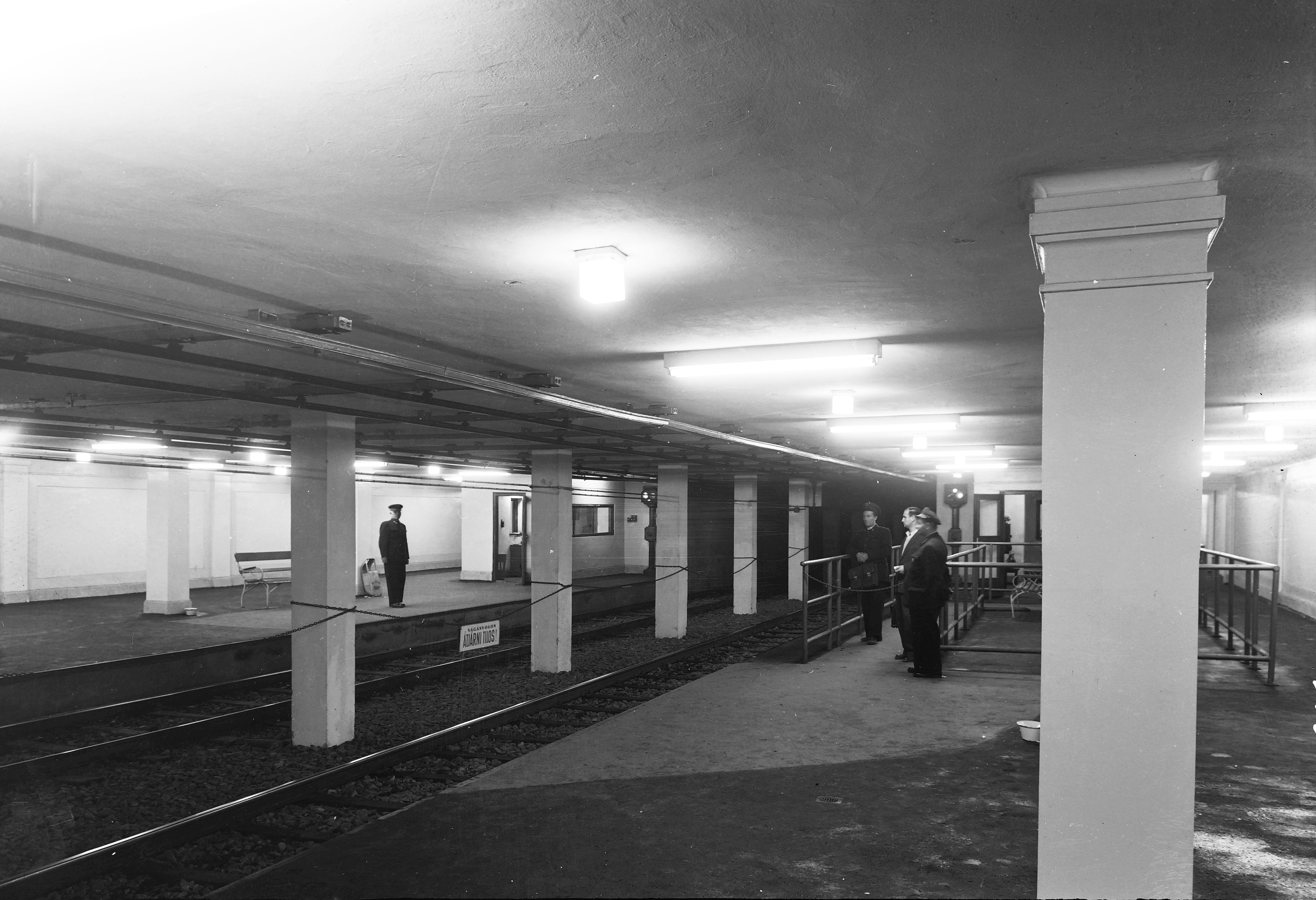
Deák Ferenc tér during the socialist era

== Gallery about the stations ==
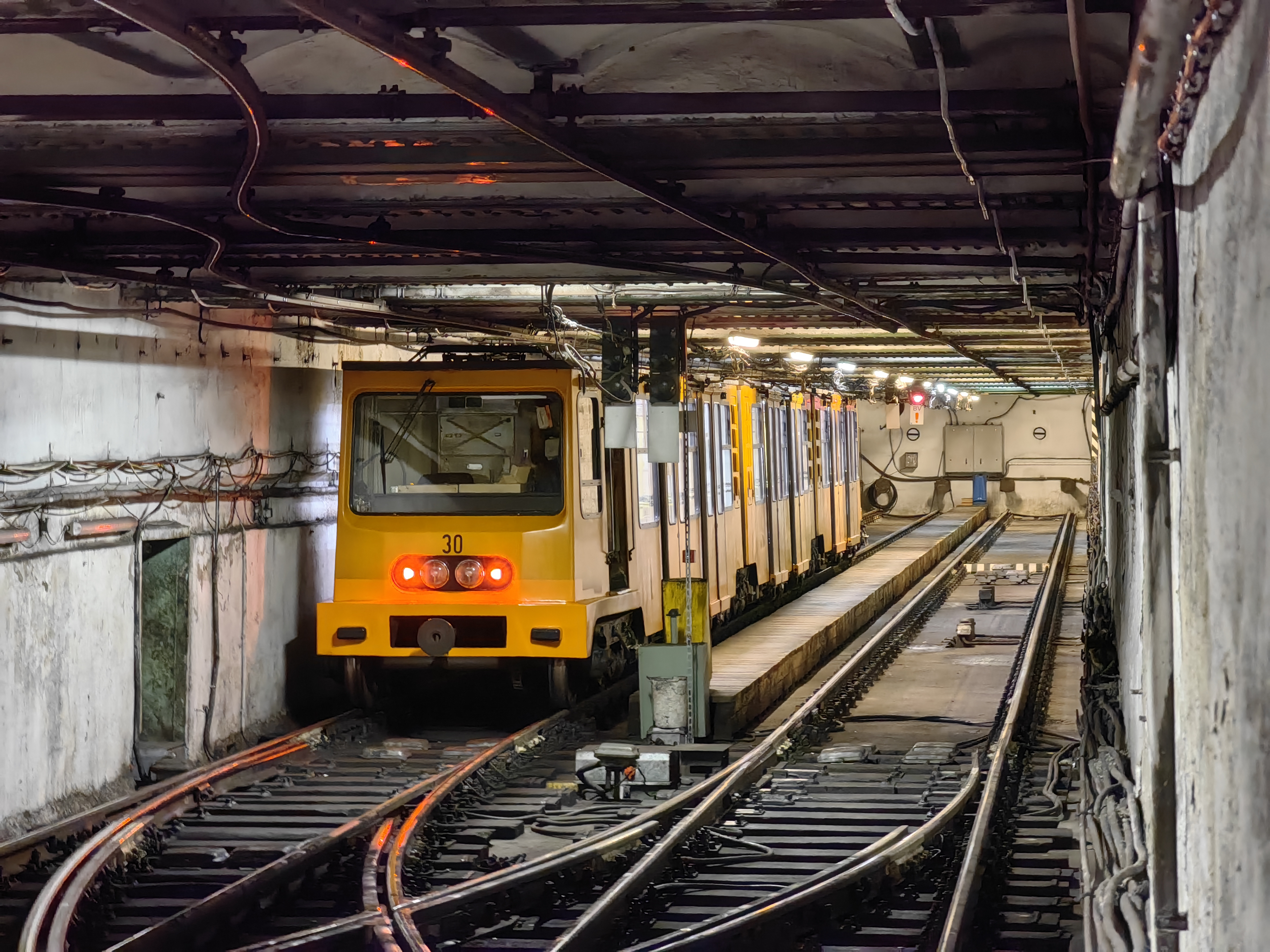
Vörösmarty tér

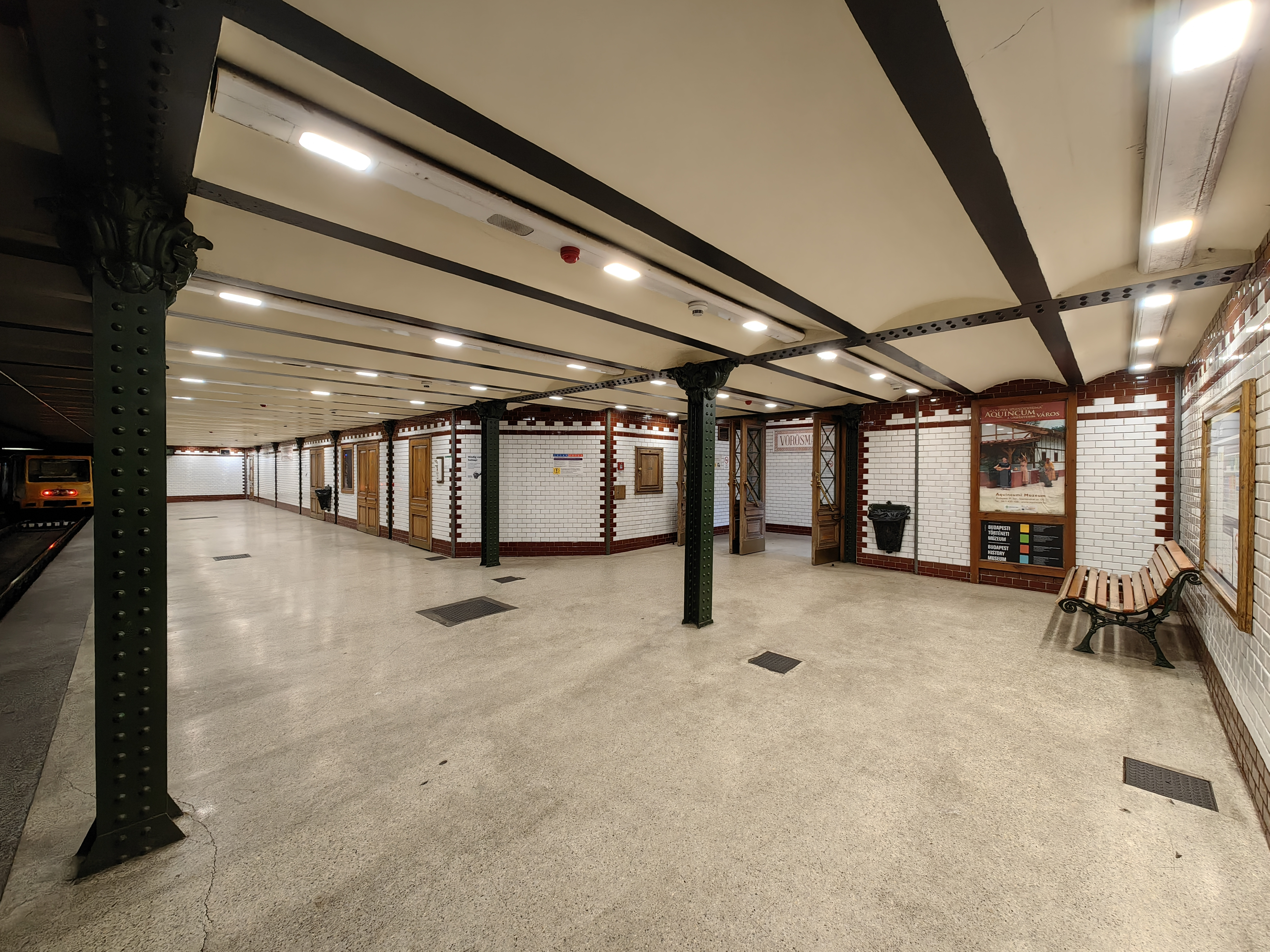
Vörösmarty tér

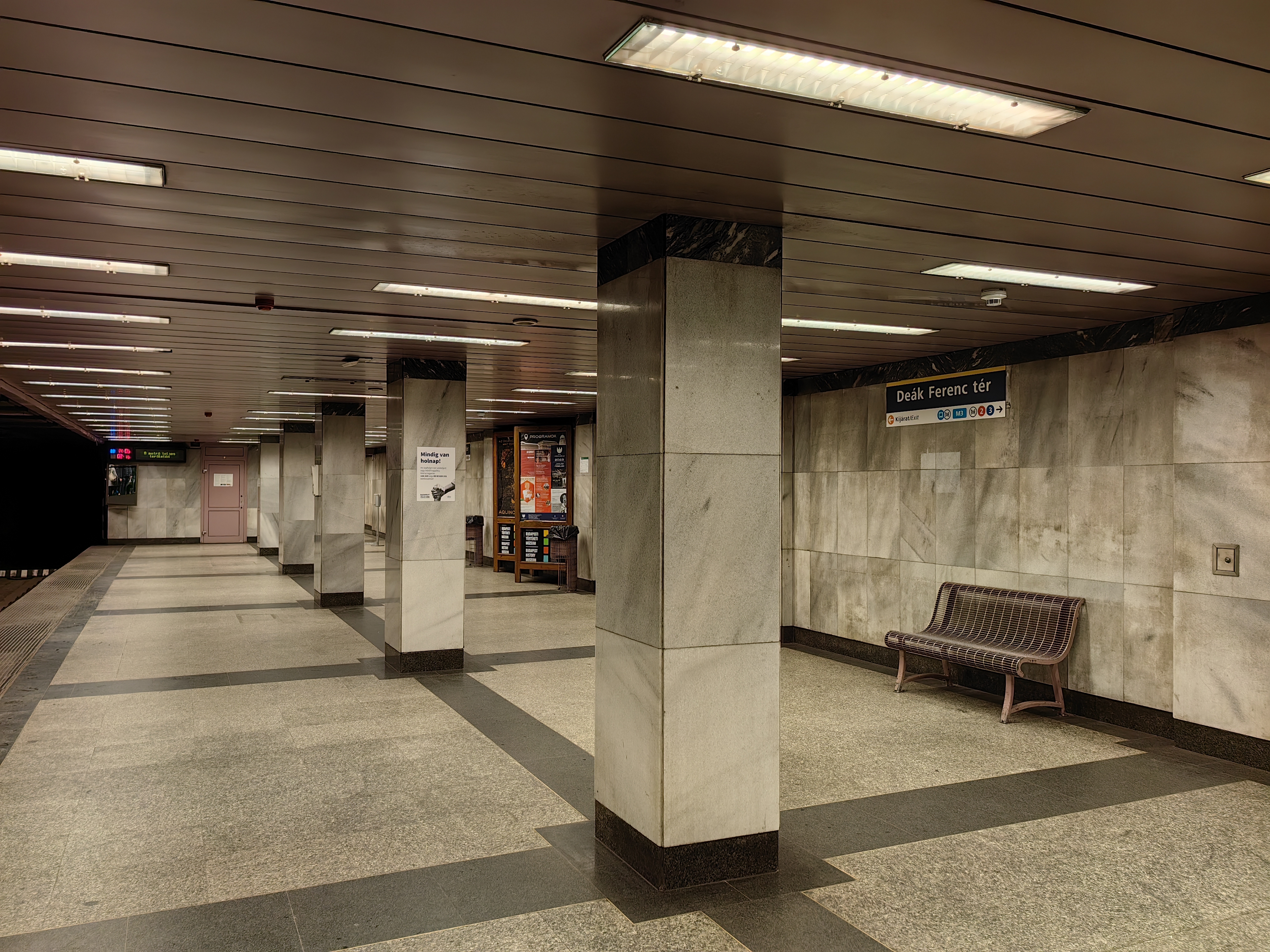
Deák Ferenc tér

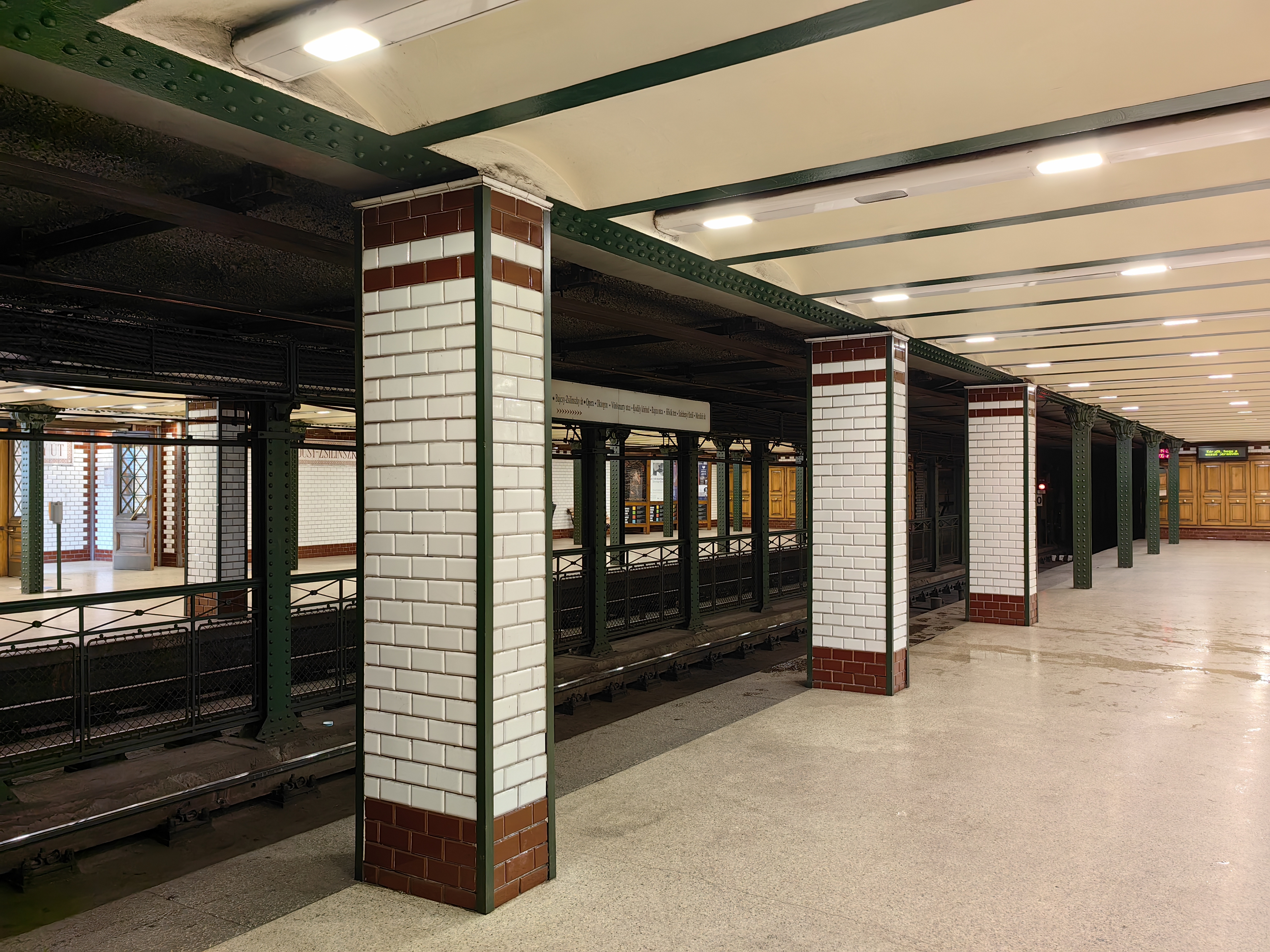
Bajcsy-Zsilinszky út

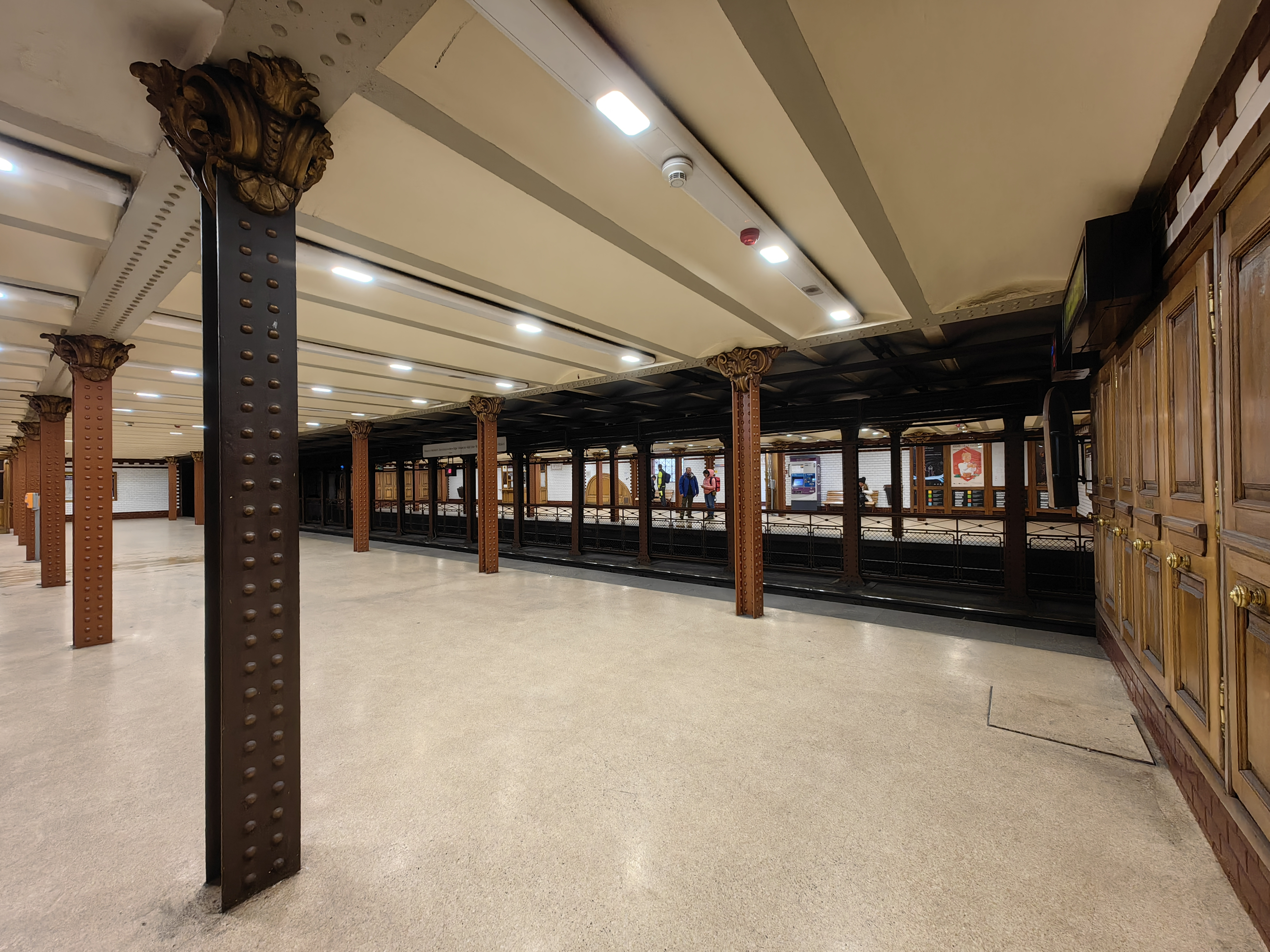
Opera

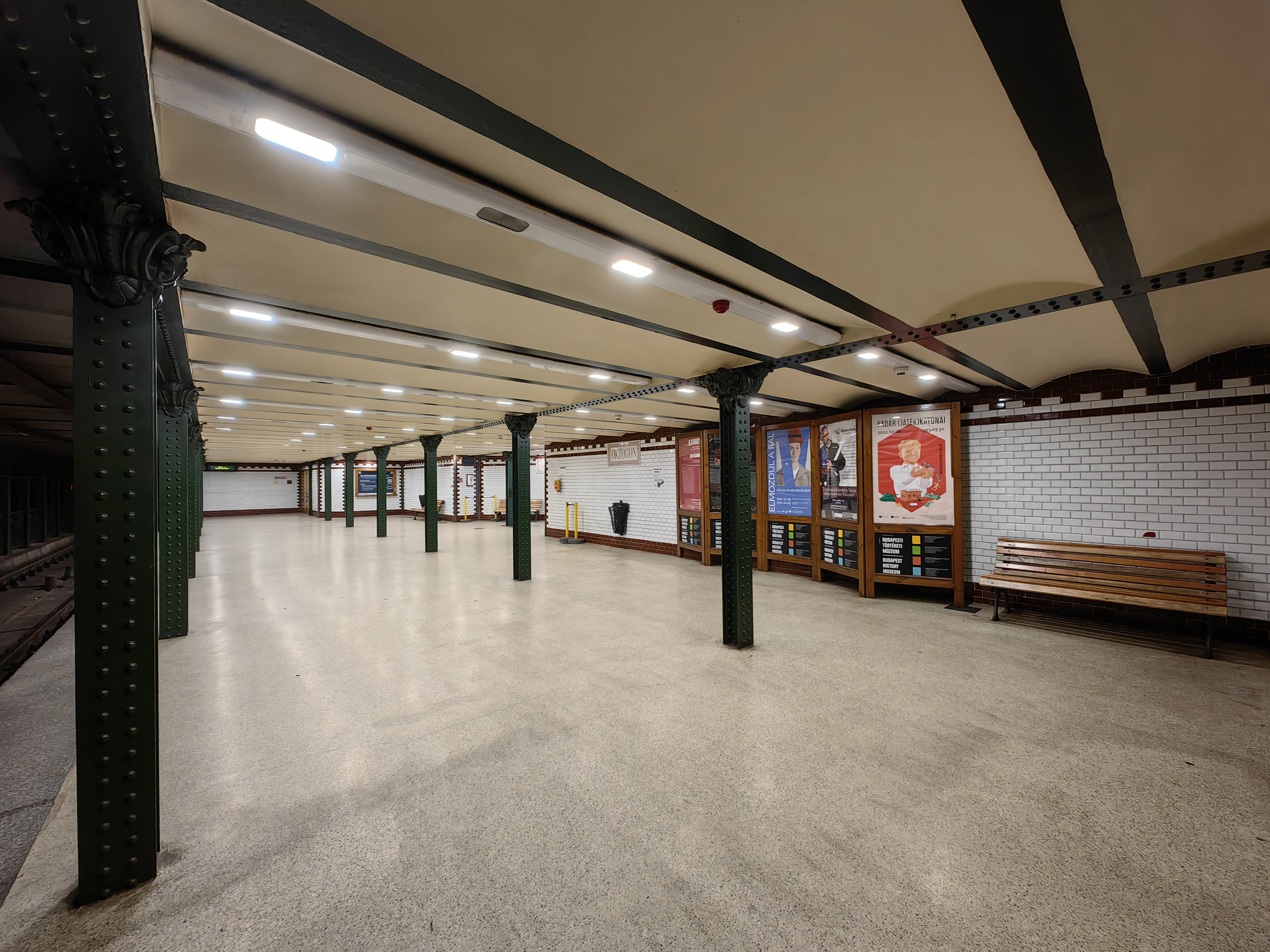
Oktogon

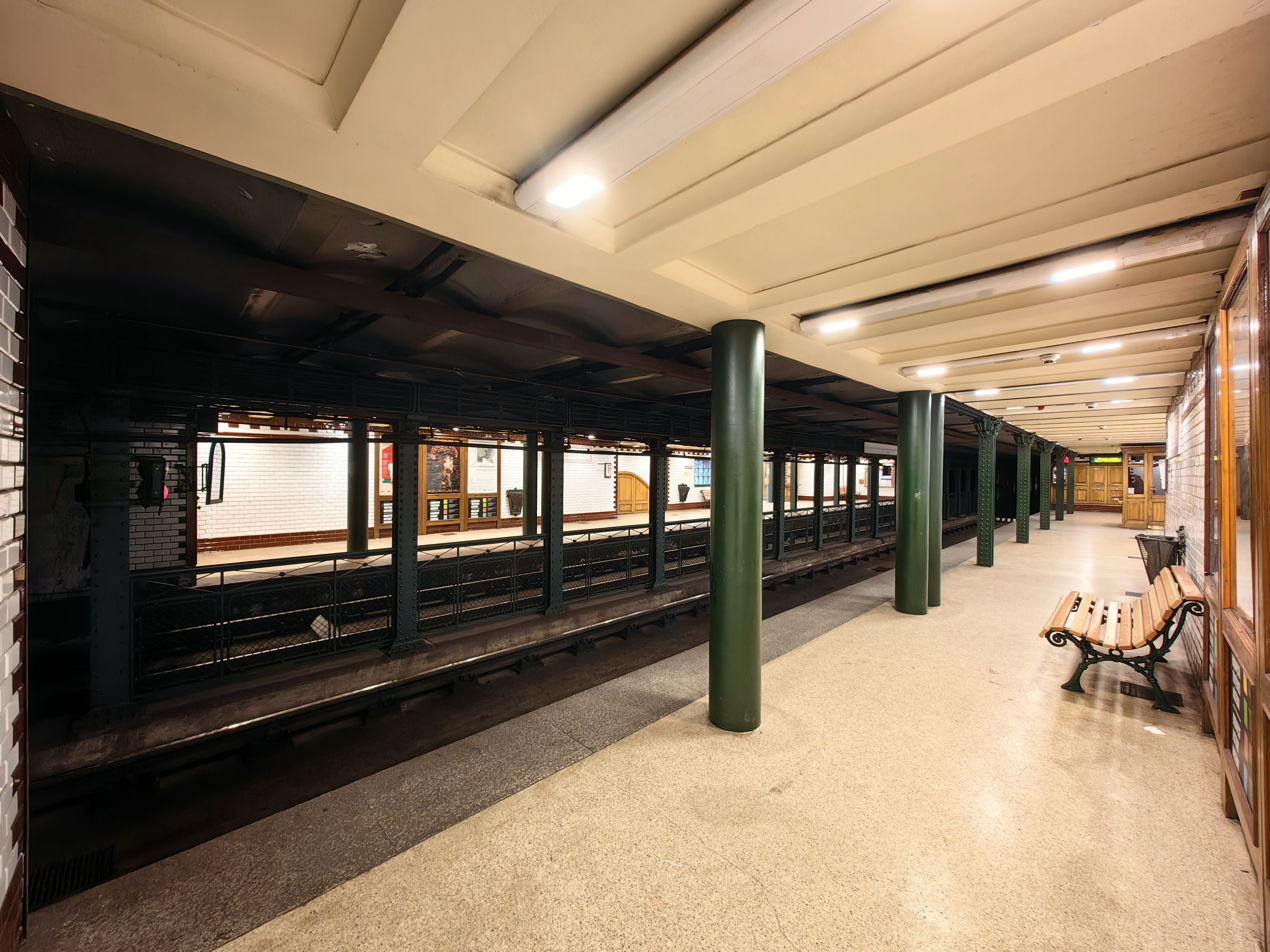
Vörösmarty utca

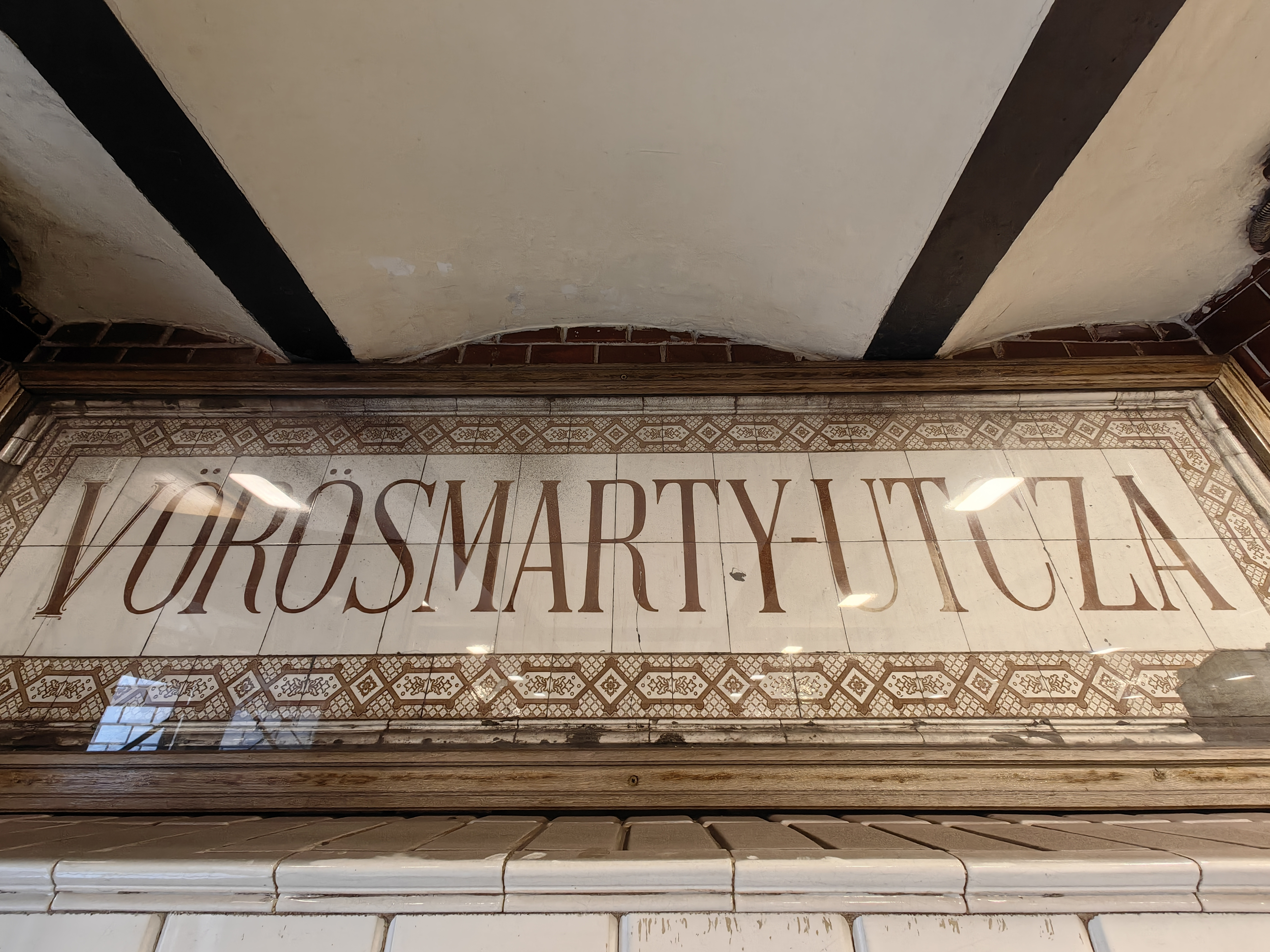
Vörösmarty utca

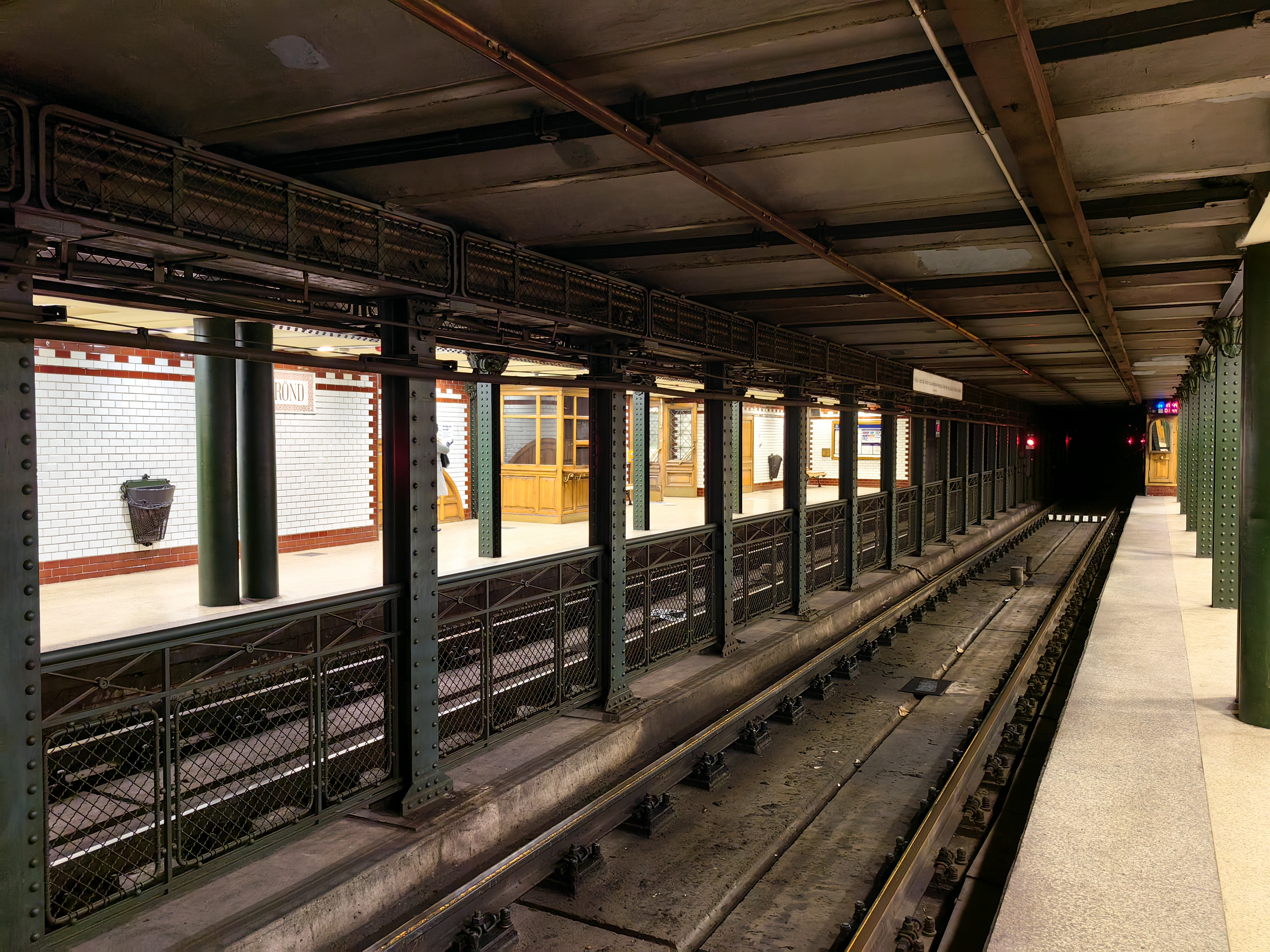
Kodály körönd

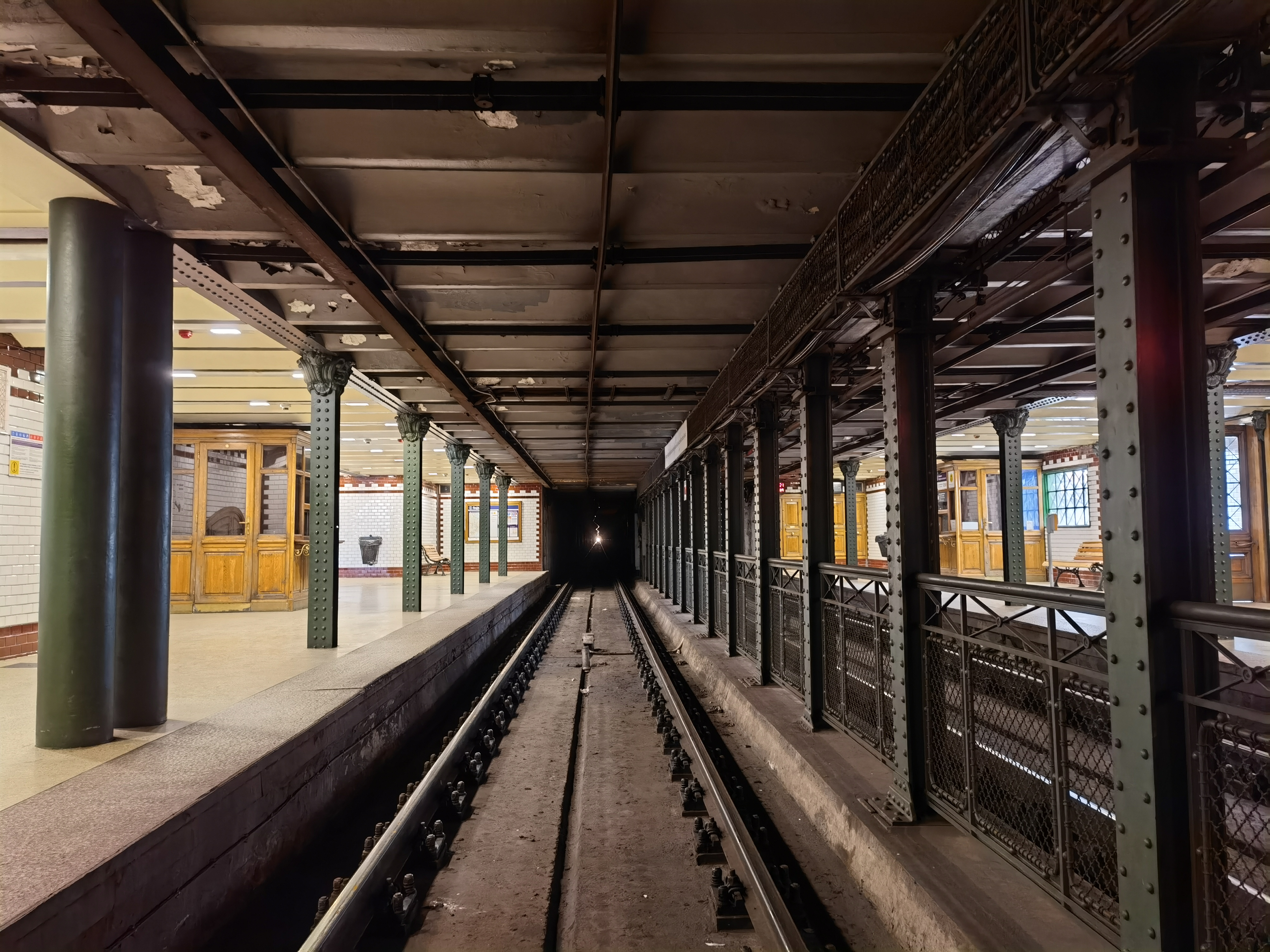
Bajza utca

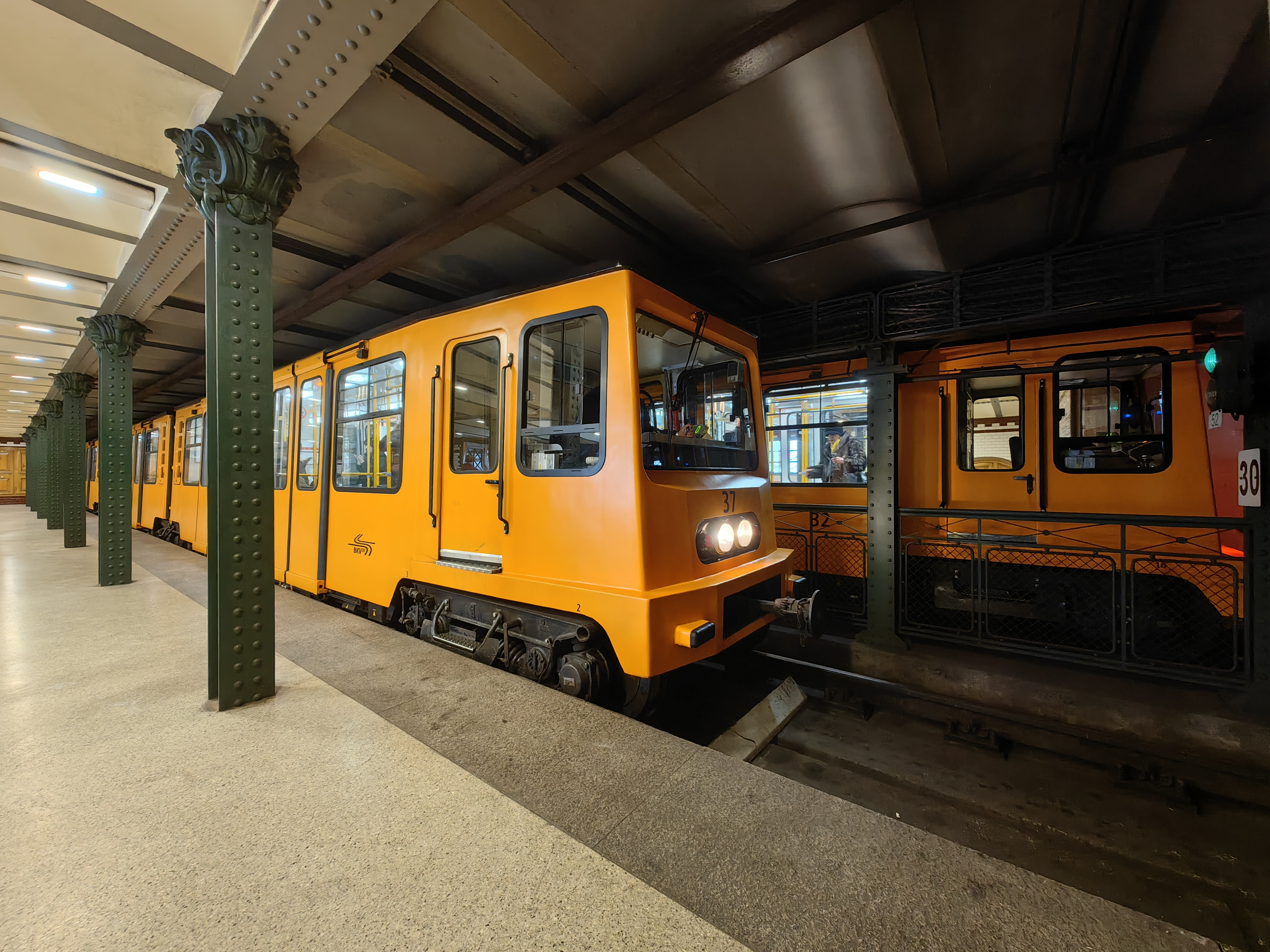
Hősök tere

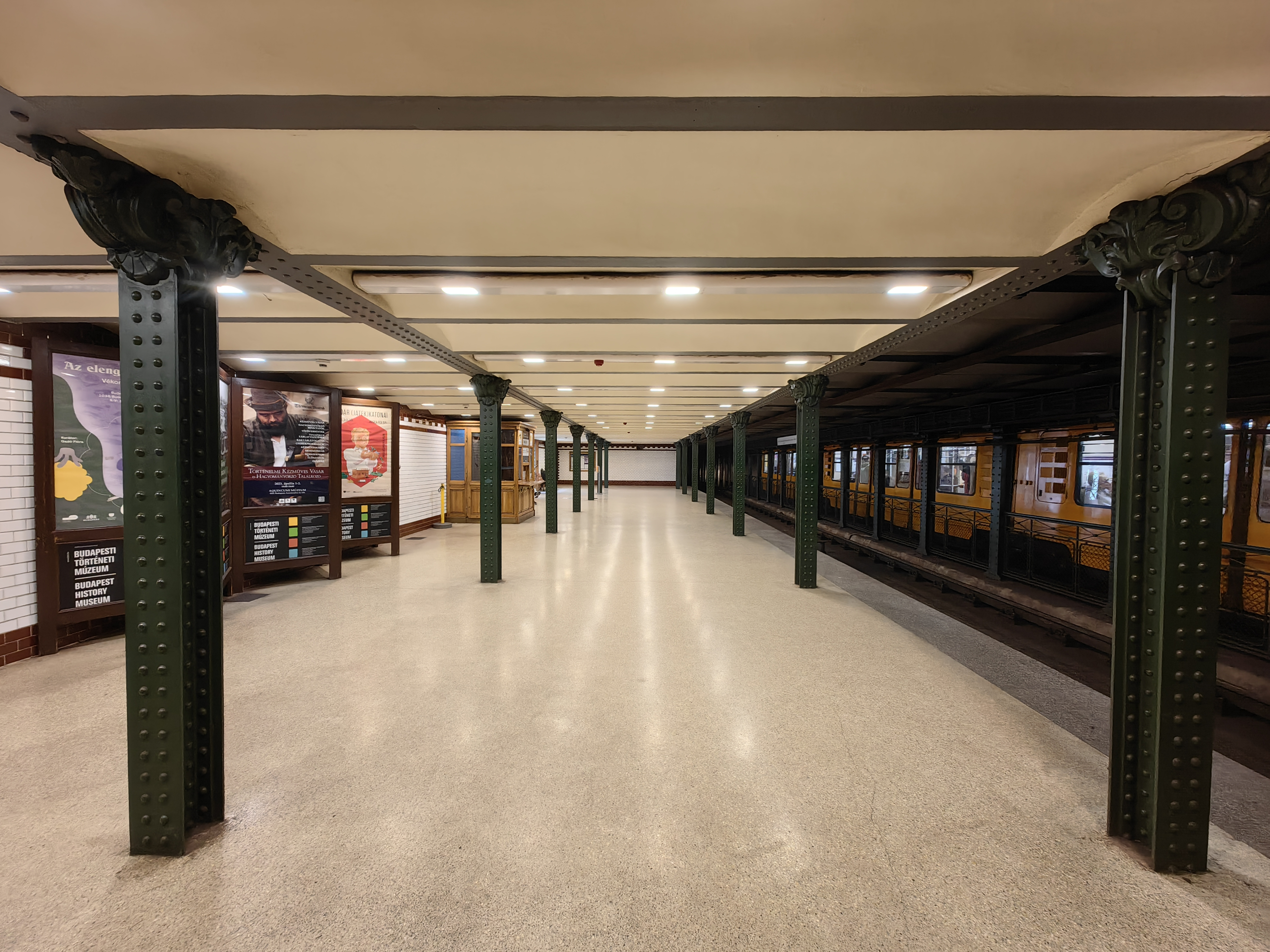
Hősök tere

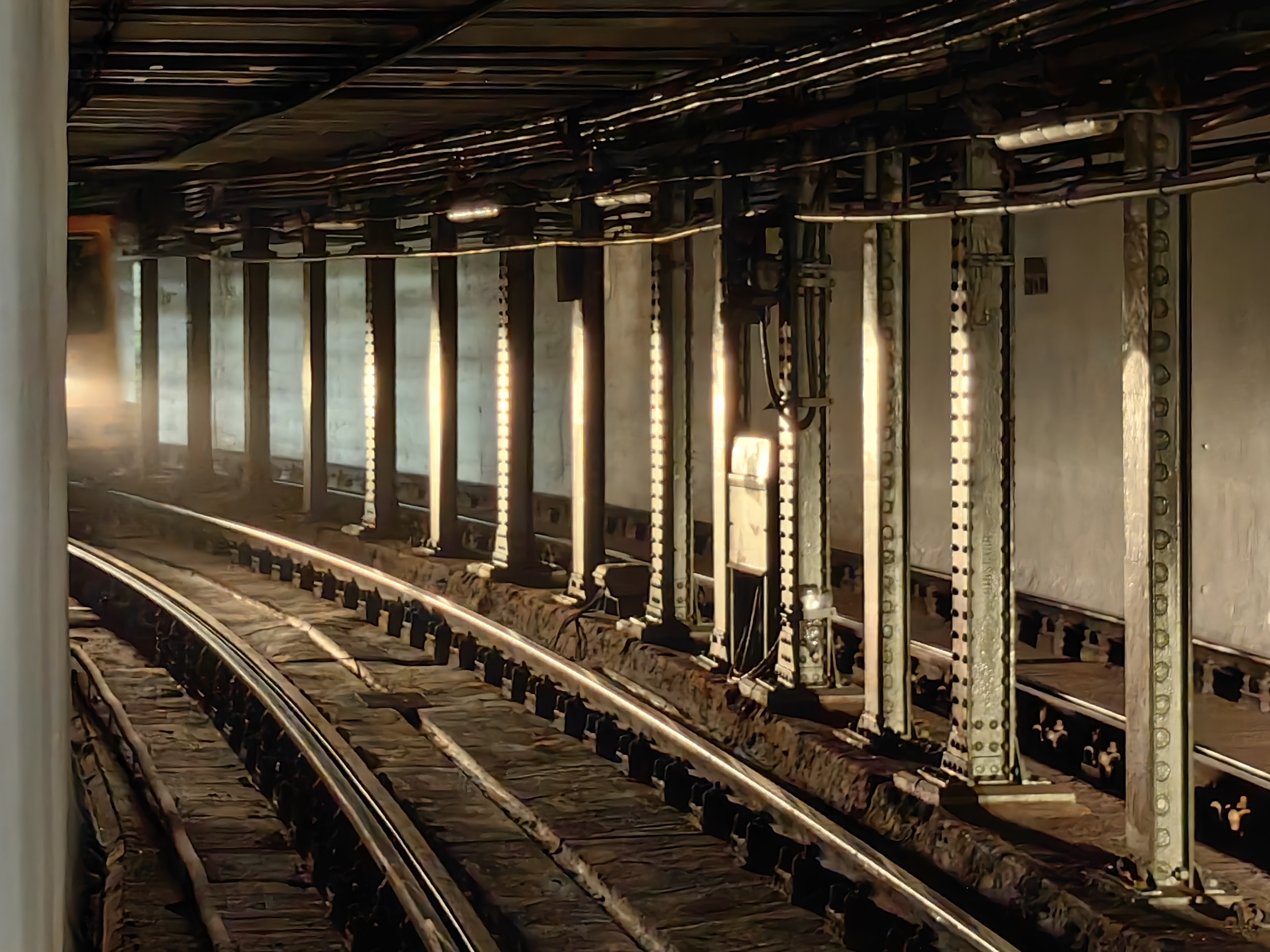
tunnel

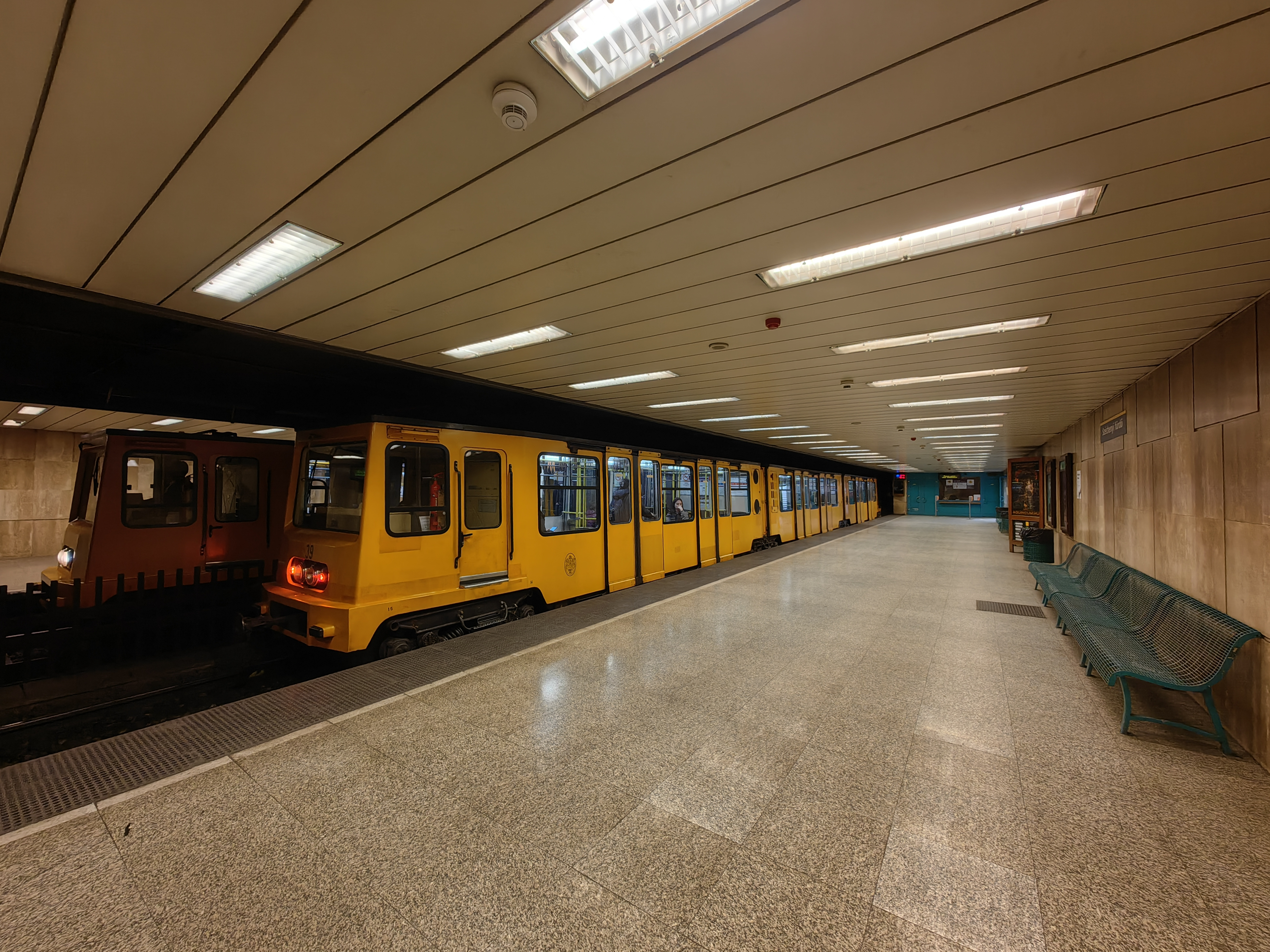
Széchenyi fürdő

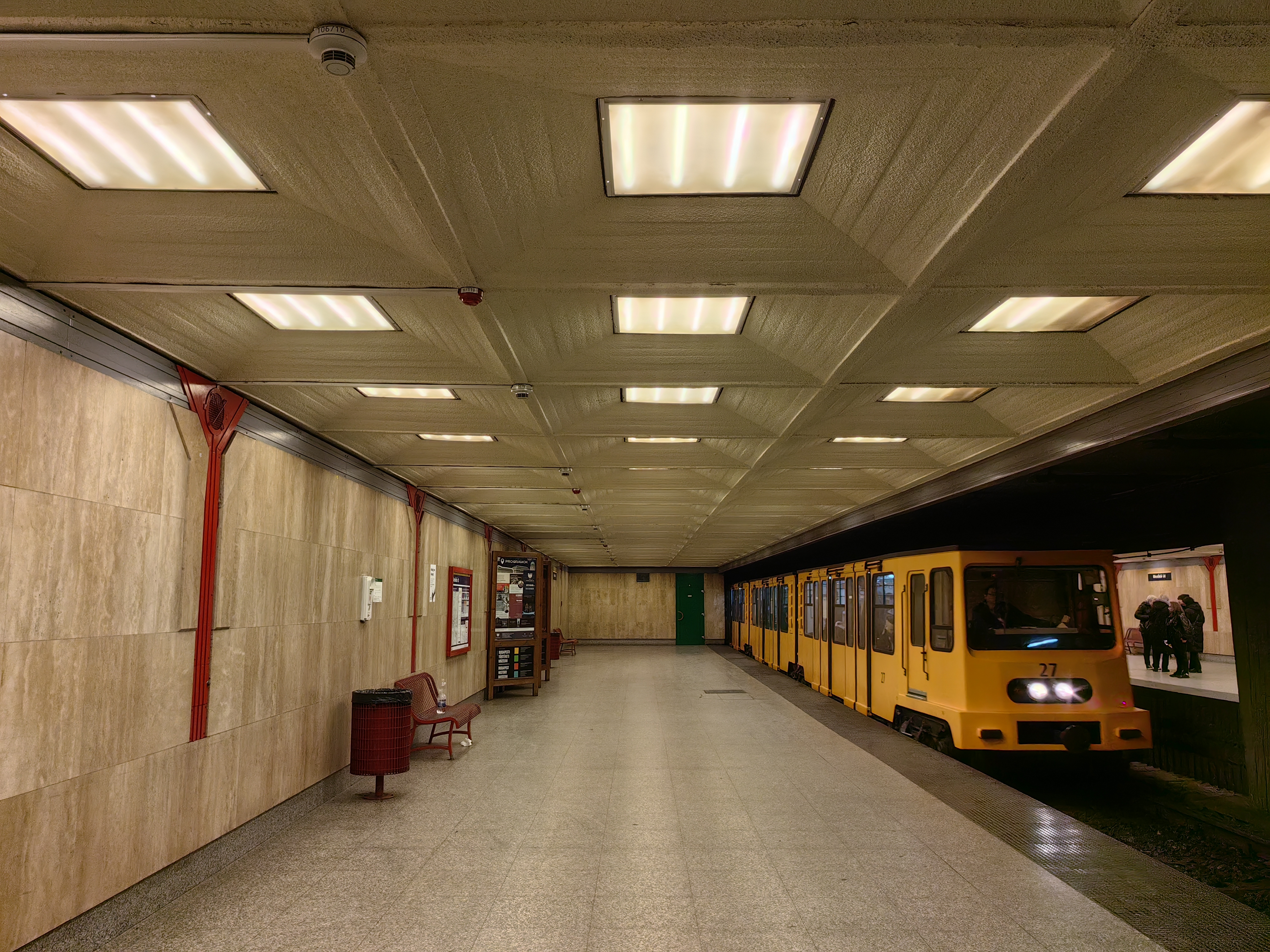
Mexikói út

== See also ==
- Tremont Street subway, Boston's first underground railway tunnel and the first one built worldwide, after Budapest's Line 1.
- Tünel, Istanbul's first underground inaugurated on 17 January 1875
