= Oktogon metro station =

Budapest metro station

Oktogon
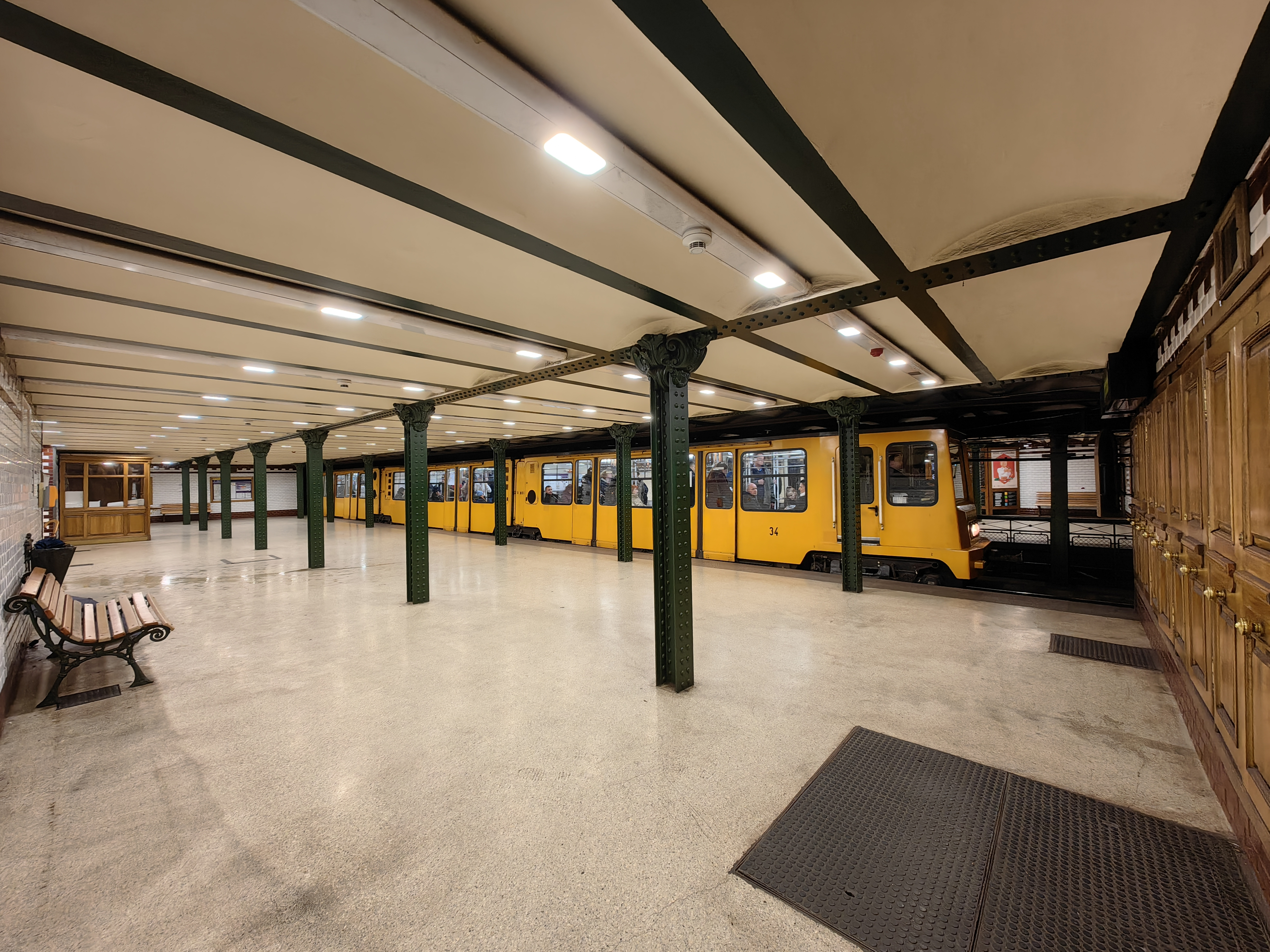
- Train at station platform

General information
- Location: Budapest; Hungary
- Coordinates: 47°30′18″N 19°03′48″E
- System: Budapest Metro station
- Platforms: 2 side platforms

Construction
- Structure type: cut-and-cover underground

History
- Opened: 2 May 1896

Services
Preceding station	Budapest Metro	Following station
Opera towards Vörösmarty tér	Line 1	Vörösmarty utca towards Mexikói út
Location

Oktogon is a station of the yellow M1 (Millennium Underground) line of the Budapest Metro. The station is located under the Oktogon cross-roads where the Grand Boulevard and Andrássy Avenue intersect.

It was opened on 2 May 1896 as part of the inaugural section of the Budapest Metro, between Vörösmarty tér and Széchenyi fürdő. This section, known as the Millennium Underground Railway, was the first metro system in continental Europe. In 2002, it was included into the World Heritage Site "Budapest, including the Banks of the Danube, the Buda Castle Quarter and Andrássy Avenue".

The station has two side platforms, each with its own independent access from the street.

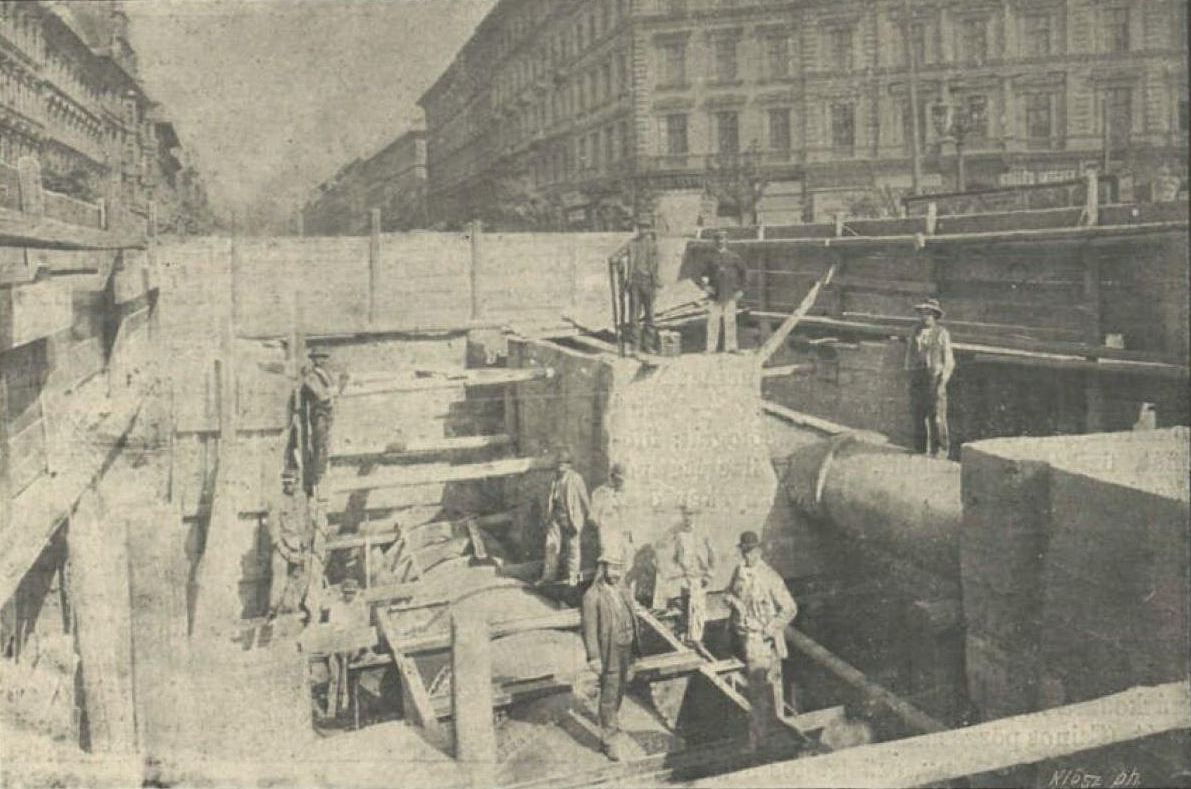
Construction of the Millennium Underground at Oktogon (1896)

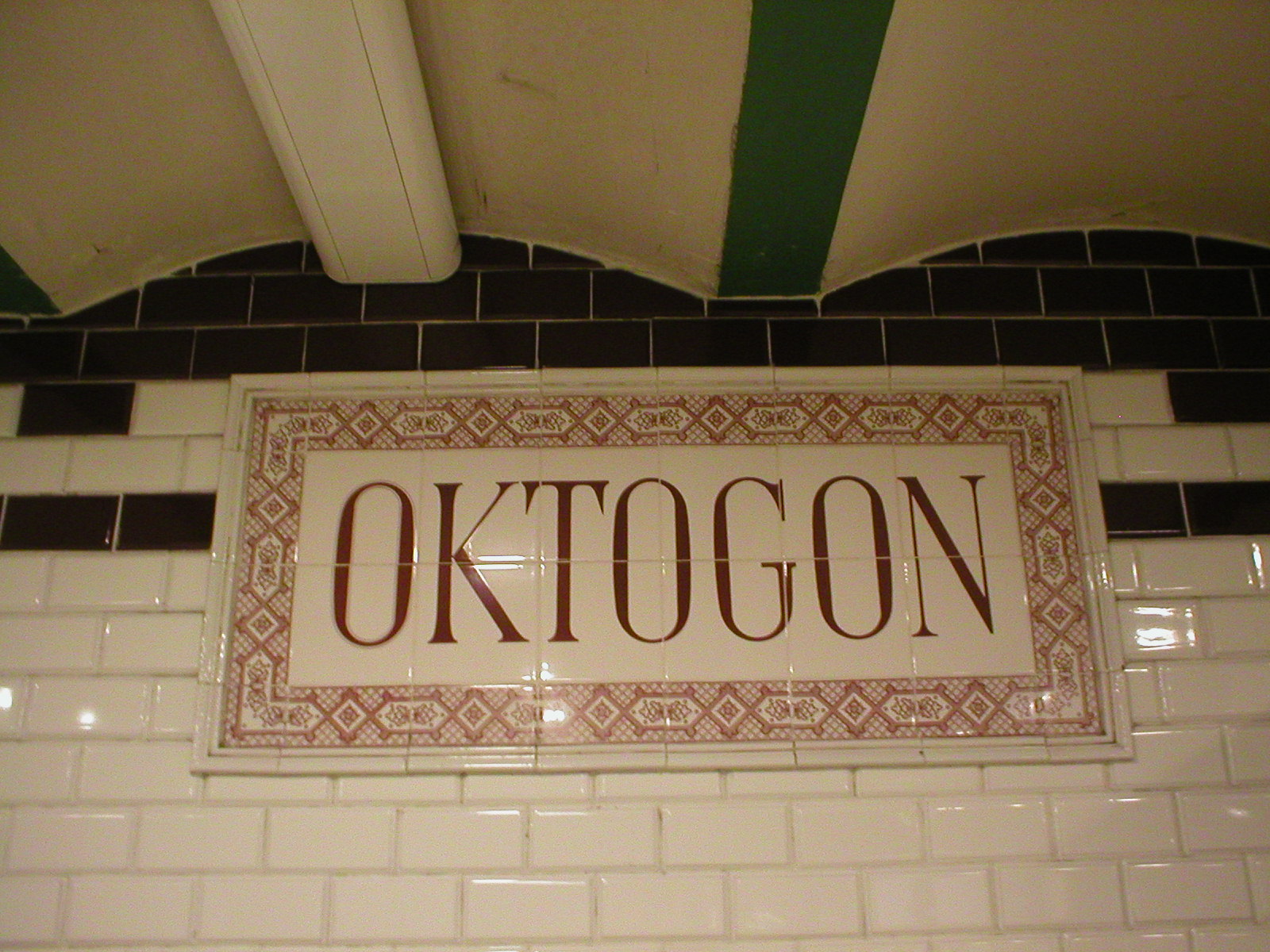
Station Sign

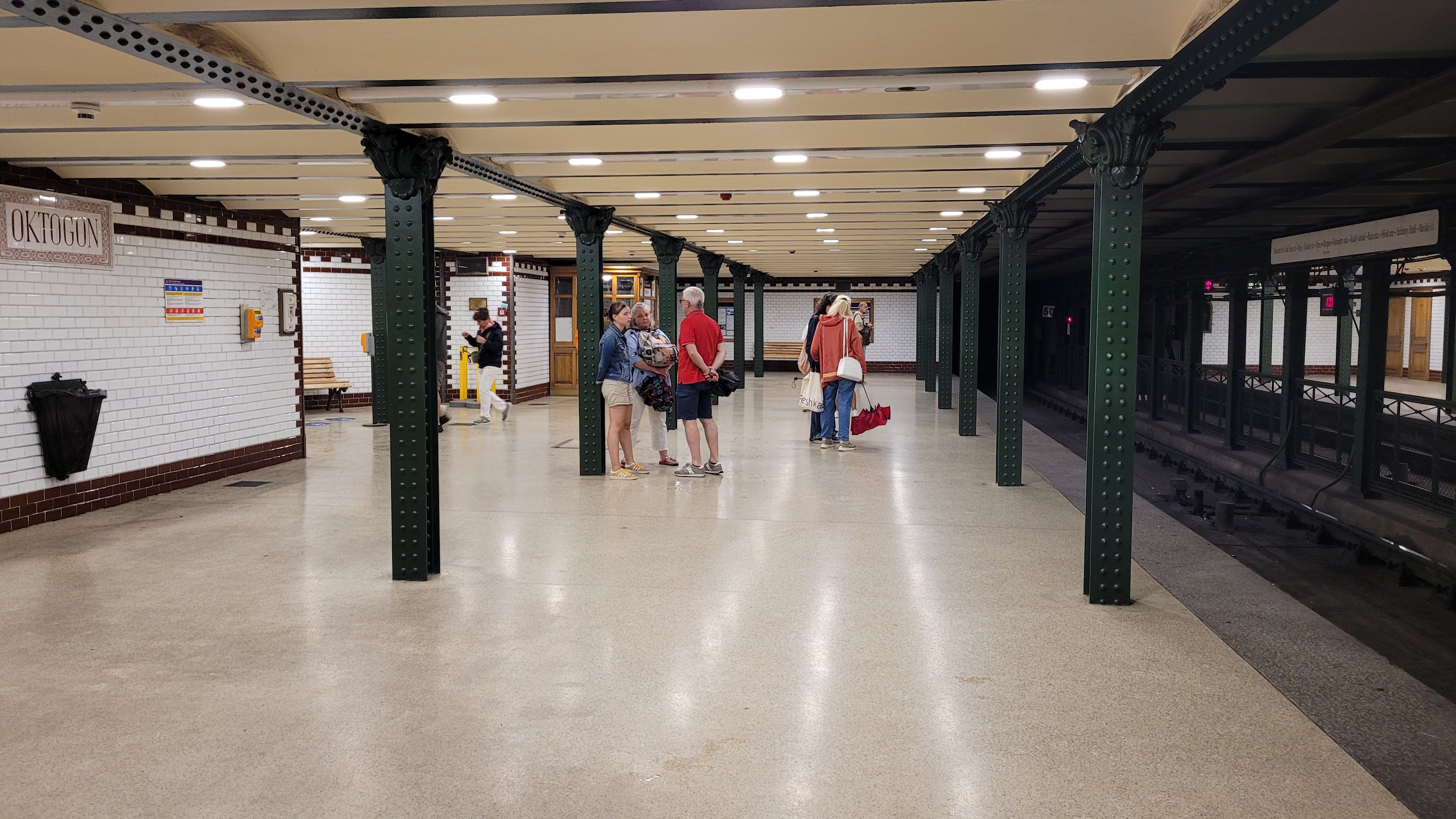
Platforms

== Connections ==
- Bus: 105, 210, 210B
- Tram: 4, 6
