= Schlick =

Schlick or Schlicke is a German surname. Notable people with the surname include:

== People ==
- Moritz Schlick (1882–1936), German philosopher and the founding father of logical positivism and the Vienna Circle
- Arnolt Schlick (c. 1457–c. 1521), German organist and composer of the Renaissance
- Robert H. Von Schlick (1875–1941), German-born United States Army private
- Ernst Otto Schlick (1840–1913), German engineer
- Katherine Schlick Noe, Professor of Education at Seattle University
- Björn Schlicke (born 1981), German footballer
- Heinz Schlicke (1912–2006), German-born engineer and author
- The Counts von Schlick, who mined silver for coins named Joachimsthaler

== See also ==
- Schlick's approximation, an approximation of the BRDF of metallic surfaces
- Schlick, onomatopoeic slang for female masturbation
- Vito Schlickmann (1928–2023), Brazilian Roman Catholic prelate
