= Iván Vitányi =

Hungarian essayist, sociologist, and politician (1925–2021)

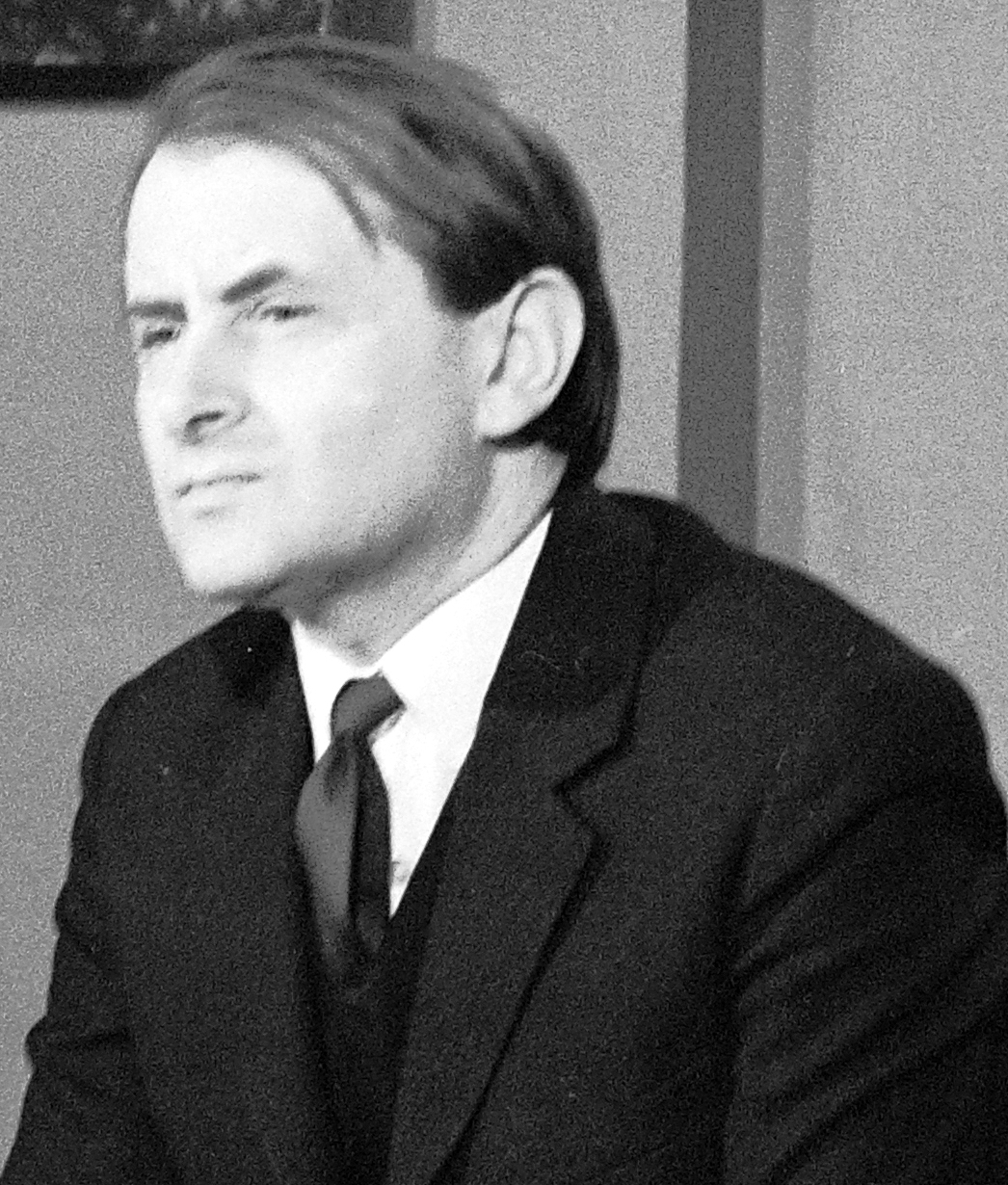
- Vitányi in 1971

Member of the National Assembly
- In office 2 May 1990 – 5 May 2014

Personal details
- Born: 3 July 1925; Debrecen, Hungary
- Died: 6 September 2021 (aged 96); Budapest, Hungary
- Political party: MKP (1945–1948); MDP (1948–1956); MSZMP (1972–1989); MSZP (1989–2011); DK (2011–2021)
- Occupation: Sociologist; essayist; politician

Iván Vitányi (3 July 1925 – 6 September 2021) was a Hungarian sociologist, essayist, dance historian, philosopher of art and politician. He was a member of the National Assembly of Hungary from 1990 to 2014.

== Early life ==
Iván Vitányi was born in Debrecen on 3 July 1925 as the son of notary public Iván Vitányi Sr. (1889–1957) and wife Panna Szentpály (1893–1954). His father, temporarily also a presbyter and secular chief caretaker in Abaújszántó, belonged to an intellectual family in Sárospatak, while his mother originated from a lower noble family. He had a brother Attila (1912–1944), a military officer. Iván finished his elementary studies in Bácsalmás. Until the age of fifteen the family lived in fifteen different towns and villages, since his father had been out of work for a long time. After three years of studying at Kiskunhalas, he graduated from the Reformed College of Sárospatak in 1943. He became a member of the Reformed Christian Youth Association. He studied history at the Faculty of Arts of the Hungarian Royal Pázmány Péter University (present-day Eötvös Loránd University) in Budapest. There, Vitányi gradually came under the influence of "folk writers" (Hungarian: népi írók) and left-wing ideas.

Vitányi collected and researched folk songs from 1943 to 1944, under the influence of Béla Bartók, and he was also a member of the folk ensemble of actor Elemér Muharay. Following the German occupation of Hungary in 1944, Vitányi joined the anti-fascist resistance, becoming member of the Hungarian Students' Freedom Front and the Görgey Battalion. He performed courier service for Lt. Gen. János Kiss and his staff. As a result, he was arrested by the Gestapo and interned into Sopronkőhida. One of his neighboring cellmates was Endre Bajcsy-Zsilinszky. Vitányi was freed in January 1945.

== Professional career ==
After the end of the World War II, Vitányi joined the legalized Hungarian Communist Party (MKP) in 1945, then its successor the Hungarian Working People's Party (MDP) in 1948. He served as the secretary of the Hungarian Folk Song, Dance and Play Ensemble from 1945 to 1947. He was also the secretary of the Hungarian Actors' Association for a brief time in 1946. After the organization was merged into the People's National Association of Colleges (Nékosz), he was the secretary of one of its sections, the College of Dance and Choral Arts, between 1946 and 1949. He also worked as a board member of the Dance Association from 1947 to 1950. Vitányi studied philosophy and aesthetics at the Eötvös Loránd University (ELTE). He was a disciple of the Marxist philosopher György Lukács. Vitányi dropped out of school in 1950, after Lukács's position for cultural tolerance was smashed in the so-called "Lukács purge". Vitányi taught dance history at the College of Theater and Film Arts between 1949 and 1952. Meanwhile, he was also an employee of the music department of the Ministry of Education between 1950 and 1957.

Since 1953, Vitányi belonged to the reform movement of Prime Minister Imre Nagy. He frequently attended the meetings of the Petőfi Circle (Hungarian: Petőfi Kör) in that period. During the Hungarian Revolution of 1956, he was involved in the Intellectual Revolutionary Committee. As a result, he was fired from all his jobs and worked as a turner student. Besides that, he edited and also published essays in journals Muzsika since 1958 and Valóság from 1964 to 1972. In 1971 he became a candidate of psychological sciences, and in 1980 he received a doctorate in sociological sciences.

His slow political rehabilitation lasted until 1972, when he was appointed director of the Institute of Popular Culture. He also joined the Hungarian Socialist Workers' Party (MSZMP) in that year. He served as director of the Cultural Research Institute from 1980 to 1986. He functioned as Director General of the newly established National Center for Public Culture between 1986 and 1992. He became an employee of the Institute of Sociology of the Hungarian Academy of Sciences (MTA) in 1992, and then he was also the chairman of the board at the same time. In 1975 and 1985 he also worked in the Sociological Committee of the Hungarian Academy of Sciences. He had been editor of Kultúra és Közösség since 1975.

== Political career ==
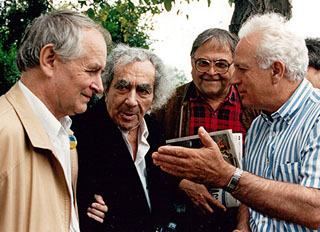
Iván Vitányi (far left) with György Faludy, Imre Mécs and Alajos Dornbach at the Szárszó meeting of 1994

Vitányi was a founding member and executive secretary of the New March Front from 1988 to 1989, during the period of transition to democracy. He also became the founding member of the Hungarian Socialist Party (MSZP) in October 1989, the legal predecessor of the ruling Communist MSZMP. Vitányi was a member of the party's presidium from 1989 to 1994 and from 1998 to 2000. He chaired the national board of MSZP between 1990 and 1996. In 2003, he was elected head of the party's cultural department. From 1993 to 1995, he was a spokesman for the Democratic Charter.

Vitányi was elected a Member of Parliament via his party's national list in the 1990 parliamentary election. He obtained individual mandates for Belváros and Angyalföld (Budapest Constituency VII) in the 1994, defeating György Schamschula (MDF) and Márton Tardos (SZDSZ), and 1998 parliamentary elections (narrowly defeating Fidesz candidate György Rubovszky). He was re-elected MP from his party's regional list of Budapest in 2002 and 2006, and again from national list in 2010. Throughout his entire parliamentary career, Vitányi was a member of the Committee on Culture, Science, Higher Education, Television, Radio and the Press, and subsequently the Committee on Culture and the Press from 1990 to 2014, also presiding over the committee between 1994 and 1998. He was also a member of the Committee on European Integration between 1998 and 2001. In 2010, Iványi joined the Democratic Coalition Platform established by former prime minister Ferenc Gyurcsány within the Socialist Party, of which he became one of its vice-presidents. The platform became an independent party on 22 October 2011 under the name of the Democratic Coalition (DK), in which Vitányi received the no.1 party membership and became its eternal honorary president. He sat as an independent MP until the 2014 parliamentary election, when he retired from politics.

== Personal life ==
His wife was librarian Edit Haden, they married in 1948. They had two children Iván Jr. (1966) and Gergely (1967).

== Publications ==
- Népi táncok; Szikra, Budapest, 1947 (Szabad Föld tavaszi vasárnapok könyvei)
- A tánc; Gondolat, Budapest, 1963
- A magyar néptáncmozgalom története 1948-ig; Népművelési Intézet, Budapest, 1964 (A magyar táncmozgalom története)
- Kaposi, Edit–Vitányi, Iván: A táncművészetről. Tanítóképző intézet, népművelés-könyvtár szak; Tankönyvkiadó, Budapest, 1965
- A "könnyű műfaj"; Kossuth, Budapest, 1965 (Esztétikai kiskönyvtár)
- Beat; ed. Vitányi, Iván; Zeneműkiadó, Budapest, 1969 (Zeneélet)
- Széltenger. Regény; Szépirodalmi, Budapest, 1969
- A zene lélektana; Gondolat, Budapest, 1969
- Sági, Mária–Vitányi, Iván: Kísérlet a zenei köznyelv experimentális vizsgálatára; TK, Budapest, 1970 (Tanulmányok MRT Tömegkommunikációs Kutatóközpont)
- Az "Extázis 7-10-ig" c. film fogadtatásáról; többekkel; TK, Budapest, 1970 (Tanulmányok MRT Tömegkommunikációs Kutatóközpont)
- Az ének-zenei általános iskolák hatása; többekkel; MRT TK, Budapest, 1971 (Tanulmányok MRT Tömegkommunikációs Kutatóközpont)
- Kodály művelődéspolitikai koncepciója; Városi Tanács, Debrecen, 1971
- Második prométheuszi forradalom; Magvető, Budapest, 1971 (Elvek és utak)
- A zenei szépség; Zeneműkiadó, Budapest, 1971
- Közösség – közönség. Cikkgyűjtemény; NPI, Budapest, 1972
- Lévai, Júlia–Vitányi, Iván: Miből lesz a sláger? Jelentés egy folyamatban lévő vizsgálat állásáról; MRT Tömegkommunikációs Kutatóközpont, Budapest, 1972 (Az MRT Tömegkommunikációs Kutatóközpontjának szakkönyvtára)
- Ének-zenei iskolába jártak...; ed. Vitányi, Iván; Zeneműkiadó, Budapest, 1972 (Zeneélet)
- Lévai, Júlia–Vitányi, Iván: Miből lesz a sláger? Az elmúlt 40 év slágereinek vizsgálata; Zeneműkiadó, Budapest, 1973 (Zeneélet)
- Kovalcsik, József–Vitányi, Iván: The cultural artistic behaviour of the youth in Hungary. A comprehensive study for UNESCO compiled the Hungarian Institute for Culture (Az ifjúság kulturális-művészi magatartása Magyarországon); Baranyi Antal nyomán; Népművelési Intézet, Budapest, 1974
- Culture – counter-culture – youth; angolra ford. Rácz Éva; Institute for Culture, Budapest, 1975 (Studia culturae publicae dedita)
- Forschungsmethoden der gesamtkulturellen Tätigkeit (A közművelődés kutatásának módszerei); Inst. für Kultur, Budapest, 1977
- Die Ebenen der Kreativität (A kreativitás szintjei); Inst. für Kultur, Budapest, 1977
- A közművelődés tudományos, szociológiai vizsgálatának elméleti alapjai, 1-4.; Népművelési Intézet, Budapest, 1977
- The methods of general cultural educational research (A közművelődés kutatásának módszerei); Institute for Culture, Budapest, 1977
- Sági, Mária–Vitányi, Iván: Experimental research into musical generative ability. Psycho-sociological experiments with music in Hungary; translated Frigyesi, Judit; Institute for Culture, Budapest, 1978
- A kulturális intézmények rendszere és a művelődési otthon; Népművelési Intézet, Budapest, 1978
- Andrássy, Mária–Vitányi, Iván: Ifjúság és kultúra. A fiatalok kulturális, művészeti magatartása; Kossuth, Budapest, 1979
- Sági, Mária–Vitányi, Iván: The role of creativity in work and in the learning process; Institute for Culture, Budapest, 1979
- Valóság és lehetőség a művelődési otthonban; összeáll., ed. Vitányi, Iván; NPI, Budapest, 1979
- Sági, Mária–Vitányi, Iván: Két tanulmány a kreativitás problémáiról; Népművelési Intézet, Budapest, 1979
- A szocialista társadalom kívánatos művelődési modellje, a lehetséges fejlesztési stratégiák Magyarországon. Részletek az Országos Tervhivatal prognózis-programjának. A kultúra iránti igények alakulásának prognózisa pontjához, 1-5.; Népművelési Intézet, Budapest, 1980–1981
- Vitányi, Iván–Földiák, András: A kulturális intézmények rendszere, a művelődési otthonok és művelődési közösségek; NPI, Budapest, 1980 (Közművelődési ismeretek)
- Sági, Mária–Vitányi, Iván: The transmission of culture in the family in the age of the scientific-technical revolution. Background study from Hungary; matematikai kiértékelés Göndör György; Institute for Culture, Budapest, 1980
- Vitányi Iván írásai; ed. Berzsenyiné Lendvay, Ágnes; Népművelési Intézet, Budapest 1980
- Harangi, László–Vitányi, Iván: A summary analysis of the comparative study of the leisure institutions in Hungary and in Illinois; Print. Office of the Institute for Culture, Budapest, 1981
- Társadalom, kultúra, szociológia; Kossuth, Budapest, 1981
- Sági, Mária–Vitányi, Iván: The role of creativity in work and in the learning process; Institute for Culture, Budapest, 1982
- Vitányi, Iván–Sági, Mária–Lipp, Márta: A kultúra közvetítése a családban; Művelődéskutató Intézet, Budapest, 1982
- A társadalmi-gazdasági fejlődés kulturális dimenziója; Művelődéskutató Intézet, Budapest, 1983
- Vitairat a mai magyar művelődésről; Gondolat, Budapest, 1983
- M. Kiss, Sándor–Vitányi, Iván: A magyar diákok szabadságfrontja; Antifasiszta Ifjúsági Emlékmű Szervezőbizottsága–Művelődéskutató Intézet, Budapest, 1983
- Vitányi, Iván–Földiák, András: A kulturális intézmények rendszere, a művelődési otthonok és művelődési közösségek. Oktatási segédanyag; NPI, Budapest, 1983 (Közművelődési ismeretek)
- The goals, methods and achievements of cultural policies as reflected in the social development of countries (A kulturális politikák célja, módszerei és eredményei az egyes országok társadalmi fejlődésének tükrében); Institute for Culture, Budapest, 1983
- The historical roots of leisure. A sketchy analysis of the problems; Institute for Culture, Budapest, 1983
- Cultural dimension of socio-ecinomic development. Unesco Joint Study. Meeting. Budapest, 12–15 December 1983. Working papers, 1-2.; Institute for Culture, Budapest, 1983
- Obsesztvo, kulʹtura, szociologija (Társadalom, kultúra, szociológia); bev. I. Sz. Narszkij; Progressz, Moszkva, 1984
- The family and its culture. An investigation in seven East and West European countries; ed. Manfred Biskup, Vassilis Filias, Vitányi, Iván; Akadémiai, Budapest, 1984
- Egyharmadország. Tanulmányok; Magvető, Budapest, 1985 (Elvek és utak)
- European culture and world development. UNESCO joint studies for the European Cultural Forum; ed. László, Ervin, Vitányi, Iván; Pergamon, Oxford, 1985 (Systems science and world order library; Pergamon international library of science, technology, engineering and social studies)
- "Európa-paradigma", európai kultúra, világkultúra; Művelődéskutató Intézet, Budapest, 1985
- A mai magyar társadalom művelődési helyzetéről; Magyar Szocialista Munkáspárt, Politikai Főiskola, Művelődéspolitikai Tanszék, Budapest, 1986
- Az "Európa-paradigma". Európai kultúra, világkultúra; Magvető, Budapest, 1986 (Gyorsuló idő)
- Az etikai tudat szerkezete. Történeti vázlat; Művelődéskutató Intézet, Budapest, 1986
- Kommercializálódik-e a művészet a hetvenes-nyolcvanas években Magyarországon? dispute; pres. Vitányi, Iván; Országos Közművelődési Központ, Budapest, 1987
- Rendszerváltás és kultúrpolitika. A konferencia rövidített jegyzőkönyve, 1991. 29 november.; többekkel; Vita, Budapest, 1991 (Kulturális modell kutatások)
- Öt meg öt az tizenhárom. Az áprilisi front története; Gondolat–Vita, Budapest, 1993
- A társadalom logikája. Alapelvek a társadalom, a politika és a kultúra átalakulásának kutatásához; Pesti Szalon–Savaria University Press, Budapest–Szombathely, 1995
- Rendszerváltástól kormányváltásig; Savaria University Press, Szombathely, 1995 (Átiratok)
- A magyar társadalom kulturális állapota. Az 1996-os országos vizsgálat zárójelentése; Maecenas, Budapest, 1997
- A szociáldemokrácia jövőképe. Alapértékek; Napvilág, Budapest, 1997
- Szociáldemokrata charta. Elemzések és javaslatok a Magyar Szocialista Párt megújulásáért; comp. Vitányi, Iván, ed. Gurmai, Zita; Szelén, Budapest, 1998
- 2040 – invokáció egy vitához. A jövőről, az ifjúságról és a szociáldemokráciáról; Szelén, Budapest, 1998
- The social democratic vision of the future; trans. Gáthy, Vera; Napvilág, Budapest, 1999
- Mérleg. Itt és most a szociáldemokráciáról; Kossuth, Budapest, 2000
- Sági, Mária–Vitányi, Iván: Kreativitás és zene. A generatív zenei képességek vizsgálata; Akadémiai, Budapest, 2003
- Kultúraelméleti és művelődésszociológiai írások; comp. Agárdi, Péter; PTE FEEFI, Pécs, 2005 (Humán szervező (munkaügyi) menedzser sorozat)
- A magyar kultúra esélyei. Kultúra, életmód, társadalom; többekkel; MTA TKK, Budapest, 2006 (Magyarország az ezredfordulón I. Rendszerváltozás: piacgazdaság, társadalom, politika)
- Önarckép – elvi keretben. Szellemi önéletrajz; Pauz-Westermann, Celldömölk, 2007 (Pályám emlékezete)
- Új társadalom – új szemlélet. Kísérlet az emberi világ új jellemzőinek kritikai elemzésére; foreword Gyurcsány, Ferenc; Táncsics Mihály Alapítvány–Napvilág, Budapest, 2007
- A feudalizmus továbbélése a mai Magyarországon; Noran Libro, Budapest, 2012
- A küszöbember. Életem történetei Horthytól Orbánig; Noran Libro, Budapest, 2014
