= Iván Boldizsár =

Hungarian journalist, writer and editor

- Born: October 30, 1912; Budapest, Austria-Hungary
- Died: December 22, 1988 (aged 76); Budapest

Iván Boldizsár (born as Iván Bettelheim, later Iván Bethlen, from 1934 Iván Boldizsár; 1912–1988) was a Hungarian journalist, writer and editor of several Hungarian publications, periodicals and newspapers.

== Biography ==
=== Before the Second World War ===
In his young age, he took part in the work of the third generation of the periodical Nyugat. He wrote poems under the pen name Iván Bethlen, but as his interests in sociological questions grew, he started to distance himself of the aesthetic literature theories of that generation.

He studied liberal arts and medical sciences on the Pázmány Péter University. He started to work as a sociologist in villages, and soon as a journalist, for the "Új Nemzedék" (New Generation) and "Nemzeti Újság" (National Newspaper).

In 1934 he changed the name Bethlen to Boldizsár, in order to publicly show his antipathy towards István Bethlen. Between 1936 and 1938 he edited the "Serve and Write Workgroup" books, from 1938 he was an editor at Pester Lloyd.

=== Second World War, Don River Bent, Desertion ===
In 1940, before the Second Vienna Award he received a brief military training, and took part in the entry of the Hungarian troops to North Transylvania as a corporal.

In 1942 he served with the 2nd Hungarian Army at the Don. He did not take part in actual fighting, as he served as a sergeant of a logistics unit, 8 km behind the lines. Because of this, his unit casualties were much lower during the retreat from the Don (2 soldiers out of a group of 10) than other units' casualties. During the retreat he saved 27 wounded Hungarian soldiers from a burning field hospital with his comrades. After they reached the assembly zones, he was evacuated to a hospital in Hungary as he got Typhus during the retreat.

He deserted from the hospital and lived illegally in Budapest, with the help of his connections to the political Left, and awaited the arrival of the Soviets. He took part in the organizing of the Liberation Committee for the Hungarian National Uprising (Magyar Nemzeti Felkelés Felszabadító Bizottsága). On 22 November 1944, he was arrested by the pro-Nazi Hungarian secret police on a meeting of that committee, along with Lt. Gen János Kiss, (military leader of the resistance) and Vilmos Tartsay. The political leader of the committee, Endre Bajcsy-Zsilinszky and his wife were arrested a day later.

=== After 1945 ===
After 1945, the political life of Hungary was dominated by the Soviets. The Hungarian Communist Party first made a coalition with all other parties in the National Assembly, but eventually the Communist Party's leader, Mátyás Rákosi implemented a strategy of pressing the non-Communist parties to gradually push out their anti-Soviet elements as "fascists", a strategy he later called salami tactics. Within three years, every party had either vanished or been rendered impotent.

Iván Boldizsár successfully made his way to the new, pro-Soviet, "leftist" elite, thanks to his pre-war work and connections. He became a member of the National Assembly in 1945, as a delegate of the left-wing, agrarian National Peasant Party and he cooperated well with the Communist Party. He was the member of the Hungarian delegation at the Paris Peace Conference and allegedly he was an informant for the Soviets.

In the next years, he supported Mátyás Rákosi's personal cult as the editor of the Magyar Nemzet. After the death of Stalin he first sided with Imre Nagy, but soon he became the supporter of Rákosi again.

After 1945 he was the editor of many Hungarian newspapers and periodicals, like Szabad Szó, Új Magyarország, Magyar Nemzet, The New Hungarian Quarterly, Szinház, Béke és Szabadság etc.

According to his supporters he was incomparable to other editors of his era, as he was supported the important leftist publications before, and supported the important right-wing publications after the war, and his periodical, The New Hungarian Quarterly meant a lot to the English-speaking Hungarians, as until the 1970s that was the only journal available in English.

== Selected books ==
- The country of the rich farmers (A gazdag parasztok országa. Budapest : Franklin, 1940.)
- Fortocska: Diary notes from Russia (Fortocska : naplójegyzetek. Budapest : Cserépfalvi, 1948.)
- Winter Duel: a short novel (Téli párbaj : kisregény. Budapest : Athenaeum, 1949.)
- Hungarian Diary (Magyarországi napló. Budapest : Szépirodalmi Könyvkiadó, 1951.)
- Plot against the Hungarian People (Összeesküvés a magyar nép ellen. Budapest : Szikra, 1952.)
- Armed with pen (A toll fegyverével : cikkek, Budapest : Művelt Nép, 1952.)
- Oradour accusing: political writing (Oradour vádol : politikai publicisztika. Budapest : Országos Béketanács, 1953.)
- From morning 'til morning: novel(Reggeltől reggelig : regény. Ill. Bozóky Mária. Budapest : Szépirodalmi Kiadó, 1955.)
- Balaton Adventure (Balatoni kaland : elbeszélések. Budapest : Szépirodalmi Kiadó, 1956.)
- Birthday (Születésnap : regény. Budapest : Szépirodalmi Kiadó, 1959.)
- Relatives and aliens: French diary (Rokonok és idegenek : franciaországi napló. Budapest : Gondolat, 1963.)
- Hongrie. Budapest : Corvina, 1964.
- The philosopher lion: essays (A filozófus oroszlán : esszék. Budapest : Szépirodalmi Kiadó, 1971.)
- New York by minute: Travel notes (New York percről percre : útinapló. Budapest : Magvető, 1971.)
- The school of fear: short stories (A félelem iskolája : elbeszélések. Budapest : Szépirodalmi Könyvkiadó. 1977.)
- Living forever: short stories (Örökké élni : elbeszélések. Budapest : Magvető - Szépirodalmi Kiadó, 1979.)
- Don-Buda-Paris: memoirs (Don-Buda-Párizs : visszaemlékezések. Budapest : Magvető Könyvkiadó, 1982.(Ser. Tények és tanúk, 0324-797X))
- The day of the crown: articles(A korona napja : cikkek, vázlatok. Budapest : Szépirodalmi Könyvkiadó, 1983.)
- Bitter-sweet: stories, memoirs (Keser-édes : elbeszélések, visszaemlékezések. Budapest : Magvető, 1987.)

=== Screenplays ===
- At midnight (Éjfélkor) (1957)
- What a night (Micsoda éjszaka) (1958)
- The Golden Head (Az aranyfej) (1963)
- Yes (Igen) (1964)

== Membership ==
- President of the Hungarian PEN Club
- Deputy President of the National Peace Council (Országos Béketanács)
- Member of the PEN International

== Honors ==
- Hungarian Liberty Award, 2nd class (A Magyar Szabadságrend ezüst fokozata) (1947)
- Work Award (Munka Érdemrend) (1955,1969,1972,1979)
- Attila József Award (József Attila-díj) (1970)
- State Award of the People's Republic of Hungary (A Magyar Népköztársaság Állami Díja II. fokozat) (1975)
- Order of the Banner of the People's Republic of Hungary (A Magyar Népköztársaság Zászlórendje) (1982)

== Literature ==
- N. Pataki Mária: A Kossuth Nyomda története. Lektorálta György Timkó. Budapest, Kossuth, 1984. Boldizsár Iván lásd 178-180. p.
- A MAGYAR IRODALOM TÖRTÉNETE 1945-1975 III./1-2 Szerk: BÉLÁDI MIKLÓS, BODNÁR GYÖRGY, SŐTÉR ISTVÁN, SZABOLCSI MIKLÓS, AKADÉMIAI KIADÓ, BUDAPEST 1990 Link >>

== Further information ==
- This page is based on the Hungarian Wikipedia's article Boldizsár Iván
- MÉL
- 56-os Ki kicsoda
- Kortárs magyar írók
