= Vilmos Tartsay =

- Born: 22 July 1901; Érsekújvár, Austria-Hungary
- Died: 8 December 1944 (aged 43); Budapest, Hungary
- Military career
- Allegiance: Kingdom of Hungary
- Rank: Colonel

Vilmos Tartsay (or Vilmos Tarcsay), (Érsekújvár, 22 July 1901 – Budapest, 8 December 1944) was a military officer who took part in the Hungarian resistance movement in the Second World War.

== Before the Second World War ==
He was born into a military family, and in line with the family traditions he enrolled the Ludovica Military Academy. After graduation, he was sent to the Royal Hungarian Honved Staff Academy. Until 1940, he served as a staff officer in various army units and—in 1940—he became the commander of the Hussar Regiment in Nagyvárad. He retired from the army in 1940, when Hungary entered the Second World War and started to work in his family's canning factory.

== His work in the Resistance Movement ==
On 15 October 1940, Colonel Jenő Nagy asked for a meeting with Tartsay on the telephone. During the meeting, Colonel Nagy asked for assistance with the ongoing anti-German underground movement in Budapest, and he agreed.

Nagy asked for his help for the first time in November 1940, in order to organize the defence of Budapest and the defence of the national art treasures in the country's museums. Tartsay was tasked with the surveillance of the industrial plants and factories in Budapest, and with the recruiting of new members.

The resistance organization divided Budapest into four districts and its members prepared for an underground fight against the Germans, in case of a military occupation or a coup. After the decision of the Hungarian Front (Magyar Front)—which was the coalition of all anti-Nazi political parties, churches and trade unions of Hungary—in 1944, this organization became the Liberation Committee of the Hungarian National Uprising (Magyar Nemzeti Felkelés Felszabadító Bizottsága) and Tartsay worked in its general staff, as a chief of personnel affairs and logistics.

On 22 November 1944, Vilmos Tartsay and his wife, along with other leaders of the Committee, (Note: The other committee leaders were Lt. Gen. János Kiss, Col. Jenő Nagy, Lt. Col. Pál Almásy, Maj. Miklós Balássy, Maj. József Schreiber, Capt. István Tóth, Capt. József Kővágó, Capt. Kálmán Révay, Miklós Makay, Iván Boldizsár) were arrested by the secret police, because of the betrayal of Lieutenant Tibor Mikulich.

Tartsay was executed by hanging along with other resistance leaders in the Military Prison on the Margit Boulevard on 8 December 1944.

He was promoted to Colonel posthumously on 15 March 1945, by the decision of the Interim National Assembly of Hungary. After the war, several streets and schools were named after him.

== Sources ==
- Kállai Gyula: A magyar függetlenségi mozgalom 1936 – 1945 (The Hungarian Resistance Movement 1936-1945), Budapest, 1965
