= Vitanyi =

Vitányi is a surname. Notable people with the surname include:

- István Vitányi (born 1952), Hungarian jurist and politician
- Iván Vitányi (1925–2021), Hungarian sociologist, essayist, dance historian, philosopher of art, and politician
- Paul Vitányi (born 1944), Dutch computer scientist
