= Ferenc Rózsa =

Hungarian anti-fascist and journalist (1906–1942)

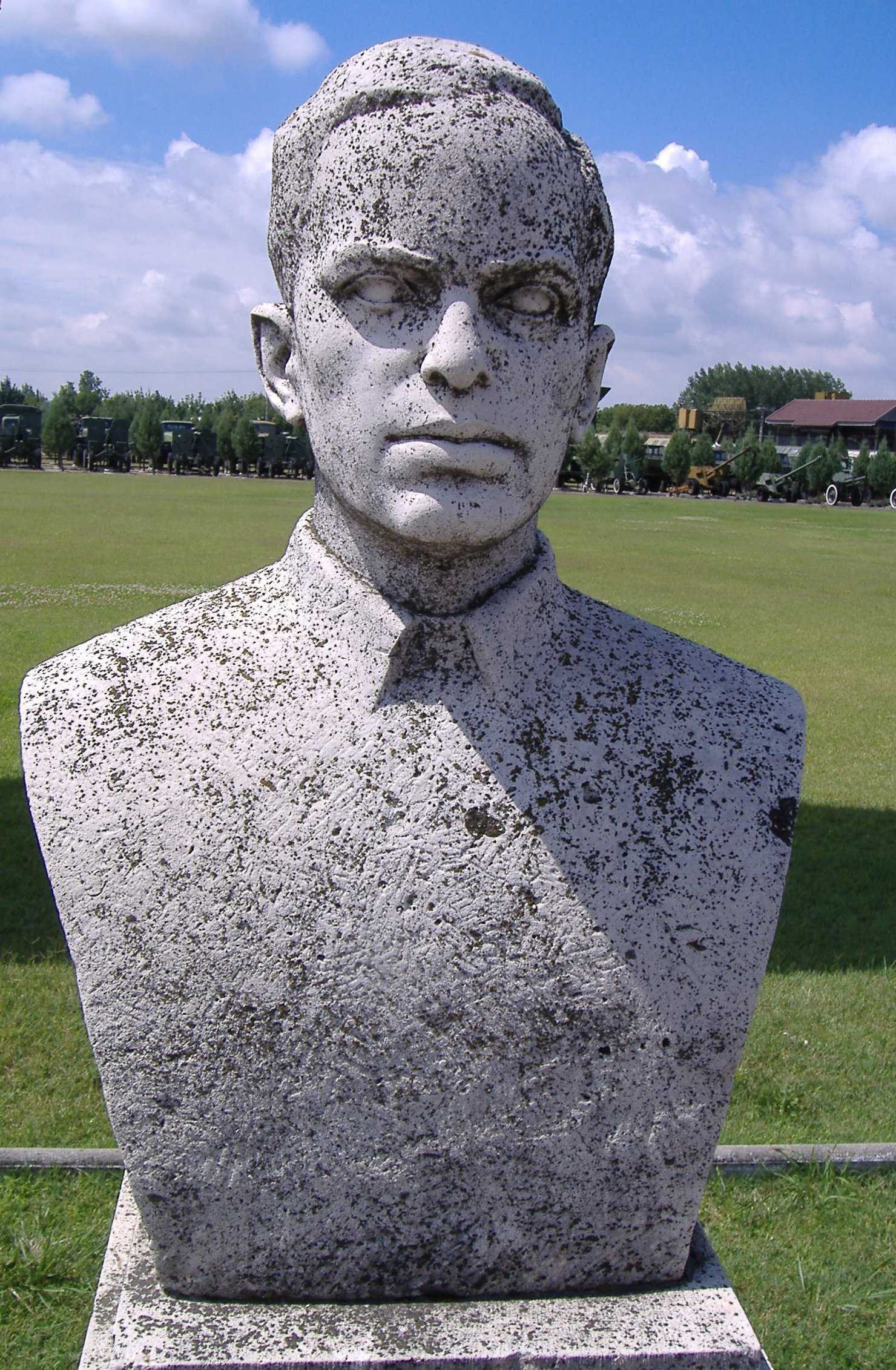
- Bust of Ferenc Rózsa
- Born: 4 December 1906; Austria-Hungary, Budapest
- Died: 13 June 1942 (aged 35); Kingdom of Hungary, Budapest
- Occupations: Civil engineer, journalist

Ferenc Rózsa (4 December 1906 – 13 June 1942) was a Hungarian Communist leader, anti-fascist activist and journalist.

== Biography ==
He was born in the family of a civil engineer. During his studies in Karlsruhe and Dresden he participated in the work of a socialist group of students. He was one of its leaders, editor of the journal of the Association of the Socialist Group of Students in Dresden. In his articles, he sharply attacked the fascist threat and the rise of the Nazi party.

In 1931, having received a diploma in civil engineering, he returned to Hungary and became a member of the Hungarian Communist Party the next year and became involved in the underground communist movement under the influence of his older brother Richard.

From 1932 to 1935 he was a member of the editorial board of the newspaper Communist, in 1935 he was one of the leaders of the Communist Youth Union (KIMSZ).

In 1938 he participated in the organization and leadership of underground communist organizations and trade unions.

From 1940, he was member of the Central Committee and the Secretariat of the Central Committee of the MKP and led the work on the creation of an anti-fascist popular front with the Social Democratic Party to coordinate the creation of anti-fascist factions within the organization. From June 1941, after Hitler's attack on the Soviet Union he went into hiding and worked on building the so-called "independence movement".

Rózsa was the first editor of the illegal central organ of the Hungarian Communist Party, Szabad Nép (Free People).

On June 1, 1942, he was captured by Hungarian government authorities. After two weeks of captivity he passed away under unclear circumstances. His position in the Secretariat of the MKP was succeeded by János Kádár.

In 1959, the "Pantheon of the Labor Movement" was built at the Kerepesi cemetery in Budapest, where Ferenc Rózsa is buried.

== Memory ==
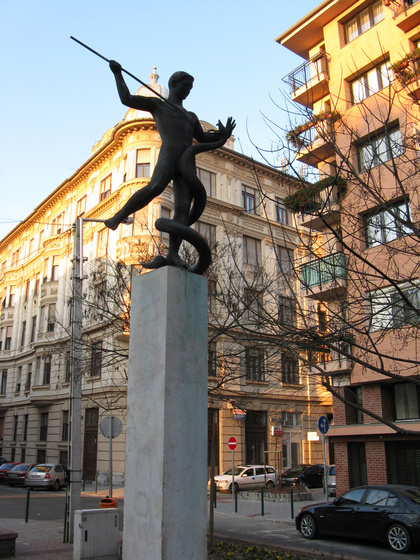
Monument to Ferenc Rózsa in Budapest

- After the communist takeover he became one of the martyrs of the regime; books and novels about it appeared. In Békéscsaba, from 1948 to 2008 the name of the Andrássy Gyula Grammar School and College was the Rózsa Ferenc Grammar School, but it was renamed in the summer of 2008 by the local municipial government. For a long time, many other Hungarian settlements still had public spaces named after Ferenc Rózsa, but the Hungarian Academy of Sciences issued a resolution stating that it was not recommended to name the public spaces after it.
- The government of the Hungarian People's Republic established the Ferenc Rózsa Prize in 1959 for outstanding artists in journalism. It existed in this form until 1989, and its successor was the Mihály Táncsics Prize.
- In 1961, Magyar Posta issued a commemorative stamp in its honor.
- Budapest VII. its district erected an ornamental well in memory
- A street was named after him in Filkeháza, which still bears his name.

His bust is currently in the Military History Museum of the Pintér Works in Kecel.
