= Gyula Andrássy Gymnasium =

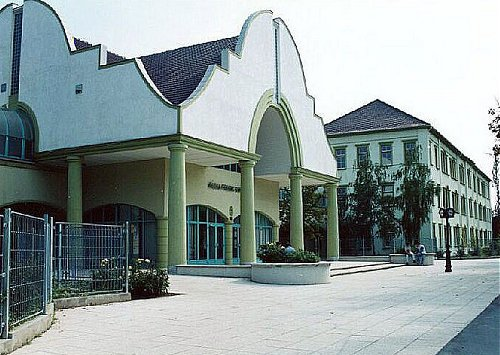

Location
- Békéscsaba; Hungary; 46.671924°N 21.085317°E

Information
- Type: Gymnasium
- Established: 1855
- Head of school: Szabó László
- Staff: 53
- Grades: 4 Érettségi
- Enrollment: 673
- Color: Green White
- Website: www.andrassygimi.hu

The Gyula Andrássy Gymnasium (Hungarian: Andrássy Gyula Gimnázium és Kollégium), formerly the Rózsa Ferenc Gymnasium (Rózsa Ferenc Gimnázium; RFG, or Rózsa for short), is a high school (gymnasium) in Békéscsaba, Hungary. The school is the oldest in the city and one of the most renowned in Békés county.

== History ==
The school was founded by the Lutheran church in 1855, as Algimnázium. In 1895 the school was upgraded to Főgimnázium and got the name Rudolf Főgimnázium. After the Communist takeover (1948) the school has been taken into state property and took the name of Ferenc Rózsa. Rózsa was a member of the then-illegal Communist Party of Hungary between the two World Wars, criticised the political system and died in prison under unclear circumstances. During the Communist era he was regarded as a martyr.

== Present days ==
The school moved into its current building in 1994. Rózsa Gymnasium holds steadily its position among the best schools in the county, in 2004 its pupils received 11 awards on different high school contests. Based on school contest results Rózsa Gimnázium was always among the best 20 schools of Hungary between 1986 and 2006. The local government renamed the school in 2008 as Andrássy Gyula Gimnázium és Kollégium. Andrássy was a prime minister of Kingdom of Hungary between 1867 and 1871, and the foreign minister of Austria-Hungary between 1871 and 1879.

== Notable students ==
- Endre Bajcsy-Zsilinszky, politician and political columnist
- Zoltán Berczik, European Champions table tennis player
- Géza Gyóni, poet
- Judit Pogány, actress
