= Endre Bajcsy-Zsilinszky =

Hungarian politician (1886–1944)

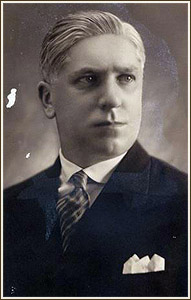
- Born: Zsilinszky Endre; June 6, 1886; Szarvas, Kingdom of Hungary, Austria-Hungary
- Died: December 24, 1944 (aged 58); Sopronkőhida, Hungary
- Cause of death: Execution by hanging
- Occupations: politician, columnist
- Spouse: Mária Bende

Endre Kálmán Bajcsy-Zsilinszky (June 6, 1886 – December 24, 1944) was an influential Hungarian national radical politician and an important voice in the struggle against German expansion and military policy. Endre was later executed for trying to launch an uprising following the establishment of the Arrow Cross Party government.

== Family history ==
The Zsilinszky name first appeared in 1720, in the registry of the Evangelical church (Lutheran Church) of Békéscsaba, where his great grandfather, Mihály Zsilinszky, a well-off peasant farmer and an elected judge of Slovak origin, lived.

Endre's grandfather (born in 1838), and his father Dr. Endre Zsilinszky, were also born in Békéscsaba. In 1883, his father married Mária Bajcsy, the stepdaughter of János Vilim, a lawyer related to the Zsilinszky family. The young couple initially resided in Szarvas and the marriage produced four children; Endre, Gábor, Margit and Erzsébet and on June 6, 1886, he was christened Endre Kálmán in the local Lutheran Church.

== Youth and education ==
Endre was a year old when his family moved from Szarvas to Békéscsaba, and he studied at the Gyula Andrássy High School, where, by academic excellence he rose above his peers. He regularly participated in the school's activities and chaired its self-improvement club. His prize-winning compositions drew attention and revealed his grasp of the social issues of the day. He excelled in each subject (Hungarian, Latin, Greek, German) and graduated with honours. This gained him a scholarship grant from the Lutheran Church diocese of Bánya.

After high school graduation in 1904, he continued his university education at the Faculty of Law of the Franz Joseph University in Kolozsvár (Cluj-Napoca).

"I left for university to Kolozsvár, imbued with the culture of Széchenyi and Deák, and equipped with the lively appreciation and intellectual encouragements of Kálmán and István Tisza. I was personally acquainted with Kálmán Tisza, as his was the neighbouring property of my father..."

His multifaceted abilities exhibited themselves in his first year of university. He read a lot of Széchenyi's works, and in addition to his law studies, he also signed up to study history of philosophy. His second year in school brought him a lot of exciting experiences and intellectual enrichment. He ended up spending two semesters at the universities of Leipzig and Heidelberg. During his sojourn in Germany, his interests increasingly focused on the world of politics. The developing political situation in Germany increased his incentive to study with greater diligence. And yet, in spite of his commitment to his studies, there was time for self-improvement. During his stay in Heidelberg, he developed numerous friendships and social contacts, which required him to extensively socialize.

On April 24, 1908, he completed his political science studies, and on December 5, he received his doctorate in law. In the autumn of 1909, he enlisted in the 1st Imperial and Royal Hussars in Vienna as a volunteer, and in September 1910, he received his reserve officer's commission.

At this time, through a conflict by his Békéscsaba family, András L. Áchim, one of the founders of the Hungarian Peasants party, was shot to death by Endre's brother, Gábor Zsilinszky.

== Career ==
Following these events, from October 1910 on, Endre worked as a junior law clerk, established friendships, and improved his social life. He lectured in political citizens' circles and contributed articles to the Women's circle. In February 1912, he entered public life and found employment as the apprentice steward of Alsókubin (Dolný Kubín) in the comitatus (county) of Árva. At first, he worked without remuneration, then received a minimal annual salary of between 1,300 and 1,400 kronen.

== World War I ==
Immediately after the outbreak of World War I, Bajcsy-Zsilinszky volunteered for front-line duty and his unit, part of the II. Mounted (Hussar) Division, was deployed to the Serbian front.

Afterwards he was deployed to the Italian front, and at the beginning of June 1916, as part of the 2nd Imperial and Royal Mounted Hussars' Marksmen Division, he was deployed on the Eastern front.

In September of the same year, he was wounded and spent a slow and lingering period of recuperation at the military hospital. At the beginning of 1917, he requested and was granted permission to return to the front.

In 1918, he participated in the founding of the Hungarian National Defense Association (Magyar Országos Véderő Egylet) (MOVE), for which, later, he was forced to emigrate to Vienna.

== Between World Wars ==
After Endre's return to Hungary, he settled in Szeged. His support was welcomed by the nationalists, and the populist political party of Gyula Gömbös. Under his editorial guidance, among others, the Voice (Szózat), a newspaper with nationalist and racist themes, was published.

Elected to the Parliament as a representative of the Unity Party in 1922. In 1923 he defected, with Gyula Gömbös, to form the Hungarian National Independence Party, better known as the Guardians of Race Party (Fajvédő Párt). Voice (Szózat) became the party's official organ. In 1925 he was honoured with the commission of Valiant knight (Vitéz). In 1926, he became the editor-in-chief of the Hungarians (Magyarság), and in 1928 he became the editor-in-chief of the Forward guard (Előörs) newspaper, which also marked the gradual distancing from the political camp of Gyula Gömbös.

In 1930, he founded the National Radical Party (Nemzeti Radikális Párt) and in 1932, he became the editor-in-chief of the anti-Nazi daily Freedom (Szabadság). His political stature grew in 1935 when his party and political allies were elected to the Hungarian Parliament. In the same year, he resigned his Vitéz commission.

== World War II ==
After the outbreak of World War II, Endre became the editor-in-chief of the weekly paper Independent Hungary (Független Magyarország) in which he espoused the necessity of blocking German expansion (Living space (Lebensraum)), through the united efforts of the small states bordering along the Danube. Bajcsy-Zsilinszky had started out in the 1920s as a member of the expressly anti-Semitic and racist group called "the race protectors" led by Gyula Gömbös, but in the 1930s, he moved away from his initial positions and spoke out against antisemitism. The Canadian writer Anna Porter wrote at some point Bajcsy-Zsilinszky rejected his former beliefs as he started to criticize others for expressing the same views he had once expressed, and by 1941 was considered by many Hungarian Jews to be one of their main defenders in Parliament. From 1941, he was the editor of the anti-Nazi paper The Free Word (Szabad Szó), and in the same year, he was one of the major organizers of the March 15 anti-Nazi protests. After the bombing of Kassa on 26 June 1941, the prime minister László Bárdossy declared war on the Soviet Union on 27 June 1941. As a MP, Bajcsy-Zsilinszky supported the declaration of war and sent Bárdossy a note praising him for the declaration of war. It was only in late 1941 that Bajcsy-Zsilinszky came to oppose the war. For Christmas 1941, the Social Democratic newspaper Népszava published a special Christmas ediation with articles written by several figures across the political spectrum. Bajcsy-Zsilinszky wrote an article for the Christmas edition of Népszava that called for an Independence Front that would unite parties of the left and right for a programme that called for pulling Hungary out of the war, land reform and universal suffrage.

In January 1942, Bajcsy-Zsilinszky met with the prime minister László Bárdossy to warn him of an impending massacre in Újvidék (modern Novi Sad). Bajcsy-Zsilinszky starkly warned Bárdossy of a "bloodbath" being planned in Újvidék by General Ferenc Feketehalmy-Czeydner along with the Defense Minister Károly Bartha and the chief of the general staff, Ferenc Szombathelyi, and begged Bárdossy to stop the massacre. He had many connections with the Honved and someone in the Honved had evidently leaked the plans of the impeding massacre to him. Bajcsy-Zsilinszky in particular warned that the officers in charge were planning to kill as many Serbs and Jews as possible under the guise of an anti-guerrilla razzia and were not going to spare women and children, which Bajcsy-Zsilinszky stated would "disgrace" Hungary and weaken its efforts to revise the Treaty of Trianon.

Between 21-23 January 1942, under the guise of conducting a razzia (anti-guerrilla sweep), a massacre targetting the Jewish, Serb, Romany, and Russian communities in Újvidék was carried out by forces under the command of Feketehalmy-Czeydner with the victims being rounded up and marched up to the Danube river where they were shot down. After the Lord Mayor of Újvidék escaped and made his way to Budapest to inform him about what was happening, Bajcsy-Zsilinszky was the first to raise the issue of the massacre in the Lower House of Parliament. Bajcsy-Zsilinszky challenged Bárdossy about the massacre on the floor of Parliament, asking with much sarcasm if Bárdossy was proud of the fact that women and children in Újvidék were being marched down to the Danube river to be shot. Bárdossy blandly denied there was a massacre going on, saying that both Szombathelyi and Feketehalmy-Czeydner had given him their word as Hungarian officers and gentlemen that there was no massacre and that the Honved was conducting only a razzia. However, Bajcsy-Zsilinszky's allegations which were well supported with evidence given by the Lord Mayor of Újvidék attracted immense degree of attention and caused a storm of outrage at the government. The same day, Bárdossy ordered Feketehalmy-Czeydner to halt the razzia. On 29 January 1942, Bajcsy-Zsilinszky first filed a motion in Parliament requesting a investigation into the Újvidék massacre.

In the months after the massacre, Bajcsy-Zsilinszky was in the words of the German historian Árpád von Árpád "tireless" in fighting to publicise the massacre, denoucing Bárdossy on the floor of Parliament and demanding that Feketehalmy-Czeydner along with the others responsible be brought to trial. Bajcsy-Zsilinszky described the massacre in a speech as "a state-organized pogrom", saying that the Serb and Jewish communities of Újvidék had been targeted with surgical precision for an operation of extreme violence. In response to Bárdossy's claim that the razzia had eliminated the Partisans, Bajcsy-Zsilinszky stated that no a single Partisan had been arrested and that all of those killed were innocent of involvement in guerrilla activities, a claim supported when the Royal Hungarian Gendarmerie captured the diary of a Serb Communist leader who boasted that no Partisans had been arrested in January 1942. Bajcsy-Zsilinszky circulated a petition to bring to justice those responsible that was signed by prominent figures such as Count István Bethlen and Count János Zichy. Over the course of 1942, Bajcsy-Zsilinszky received several letters from the Ministry of Defense warning him he would be prosecuted for "impugning the honor of the Army" if he continued his campaign to have Feketehalmy-Czeydner and the other officers responsible for the massacre charged with war crimes. The Defense Minister General Károly Bartha wanted Bajcsy-Zsilinszky imprisoned, but Miklós Kállay who replaced Bárdossy as prime minister in March 1942 was unwilling to support such a step.

In January 1943, to mark the first anniversary of the massacre, Bajcsy-Zsilinszky attempted to raise the issue on the floor of Parliament and was met with sustained abuse by MPs from the Arrow Cross Party led by Ferenc Szálasi and the Party of Hungarian Renewal led by Béla Imrédy. As he attempted to speak, he was shouted down by other MPs who screamed at him "They killed Hungarian gendarmes!", "Treason!" and "Tell it to the English! Because you are speaking to them anyhow!" Despite the abuse, Bajcsy-Zsilinszky bravely tried to continue his speech, by quoting from accounts by the surviors of the massacre, only to have such accusations thrown at him such as "are you Hungarian?" and "it is sad that you bring such things up!" The speaker of the house warned Bajcsy-Zsilinszky that his speech was "against the public interest" and ordered him to stop. Bajcsy-Zsilinszky finally snapped and shouted back "there will be a time when you will speak otherwise!". The speaker of the house ordered him ejected from the floor, leading Bajcsy-Zsilinszky to shout as he was being marked out "it was only my Hungarian conscience speaking out!"

On March 19, 1944, Bajcsy-Zsilinszky, at his residence, fought with a weapon to prevent arrest by the Gestapo. He was wounded in the brief gun battle, arrested, and hauled away On the morning of 19 March, the SS rang the doorbell on his apartment and his wife answered, saying he was asleep and to come again at 11am. The SS ignored her and continued to ring the bell, waking up Bajcsy-Zsilinszky who called the police, saying that as a MP he should not be arrested by a foreign power on Hungarian soil. The police refused to come, giving the excuse that they were too busy. Afterwards, the SS left, but then returned, shot off the lock and kicked in the door. In an interview in 1984, Bajcsy-Zsilinszky's widow recalled:

"Holding his pistol ready to shoot, my husband stood in front of the bedroom door. One of the armed SS shouted 'Hinaus! Hinaus'...That [was] when Endre took his first shot. The SS answered with a machine gun round. Pieces of glass from the glass-door, the window, the mirror flew around the flat. They also hit the radio...In the middle of the shooting I heard Endre say: 'A shot in the stomach...one in the shoulder!' I thought he wanted to tell me of the targets he had hit, but it turned out that he spoke of his own wounds...After he had shot the last bullet from his pistol, Endre then threw the pistol through the door into the living room, at which the SS rushed into the room, tied his hands behind him and took him away bleeding from several wounds".

From his prison cell, Bajcsy-Zsilinszky was able to maintain contact with the Smallholder Party, and called once again for an alliance of the other parties to build a resistance movement against the German occupation. On October 11 of the same year, his release was demanded and obtained by the Hungarian government of General Géza Lakatos. On 15 October 1944, the Germans deposed Admiral Horthy as a Regent for signing an armistice with the Allies and installed Ferenc Szálasi of the Arrow Cross Party as the "Leader of the Nation". On 9 November 1944, Bajcsy-Zsilinszky met with the leaders of other parties at the Nitrochemical Industrial factory in Budapest to found the Liberation Committee of the Hungarian National Uprising to work to overthrow the Arrow Cross regime. At that meeting, Bajcsy-Zsilinszky was elected president of the Liberation Committee. As a resistance leader, Bajcsy-Zsilinszky's first concern was establishing an armed wing to fight against the Arrow Cross and the Germans.

Bajcsy-Zsilinszky recruited a former Honved officer, lieutenant general János Kiss, who had retired in 1939, to serve as the Liberation Committee's military chief, in charge of training and arming the resistance movement. Kiss in turn recruited retired Captain Vilmos Tartsay and retired Captain Jenó Nagy to work as his assistants. Bajcsy-Zsilinszky and Kiss were at first more interested in turning the Honved against the Arrow Cross regime than in founding a guerrilla movement. Right from the start of the Arrow Cross regime on 15 October 1944, Szálasi had allowed the thuggish Arrow Cross militia to run amok with the militiamen arbitrarily looting and killing people on the streets. Reflecting the prevailing idolisation of Hungarian gentlemen, both Bajcsy-Zsilinszky and Kiss believed that the majority of the Honved leaders as officers and gentlemen could not possibly be loyal to such a regime and both felt that only 5% of the Honved were loyal to the Arrow Cross. Despite the failure of the Warsaw Uprising, Bajcsy-Zsilinszky and Kiss intended a similar uprising in Budapest to be led by the Honved aimed at expelling the Germans and overthrowing the Arrow Cross.

At a meeting on 10 November 1944, Kiss stated it would be impossible for a few lightly armed guerrillas to defeat the mighty Wehrmacht and it would be necessary to work with the Red Army for the general uprising plan to work. Bajcsy-Zsilinszky met with the general secretary of the Hungarian Communist Party, László Rajk, to seek Soviet help. At a meeting on 14 November 1944 attended by Bajcsy-Zsilinszky, Kiss and Rajk, it was agreed that the Communists would start a guerrilla war while Kiss would concentrate on creating a para-military force that would overthrow the Arrow Cross once the Red Army was close enough to Budapest to provide help. Bajcsy-Zsilinszky stressed that it would be impossible to defeat the Wehrmacht on their own and it was essential that the Red Army be present to help once the planned general uprising was launched in Budapest. Rajk, a veteran Communist who had spent years trying to overthrow the Horthy regime, felt that the other members of the Liberation Committee, were sloppy about maintaining secrecy. HIs concerns were well justified as the State Police (who had mostly decided to back the Arrow Cross regime) were soon following the members of the Liberation Committee as they sought to obtain arms. In November, he was again arrested and incarcerated in the Sopronkőhida prison for trying to organize an uprising against the Arrow Cross Party government. On 22 November 1944, the Arrow Cross militia raided the home of a LIberation Committee member, Vilmos Tartsay, and arrested most of the members of the military sub-committee of the LIberation Committee. Later on the evening of 22 November, Bajcsy-Zsilinszky was arrested while having a meeting with Kiss to discuss what to do after Tartsay's arrest. On 8 December 1944, Kiss, Nagy and Tartsay were executed by firing squad. Bajcsy-Zsilinszky was executed by hanging on December 24 1944. On May 27, 1945, he was reburied in Tarpa with honours.

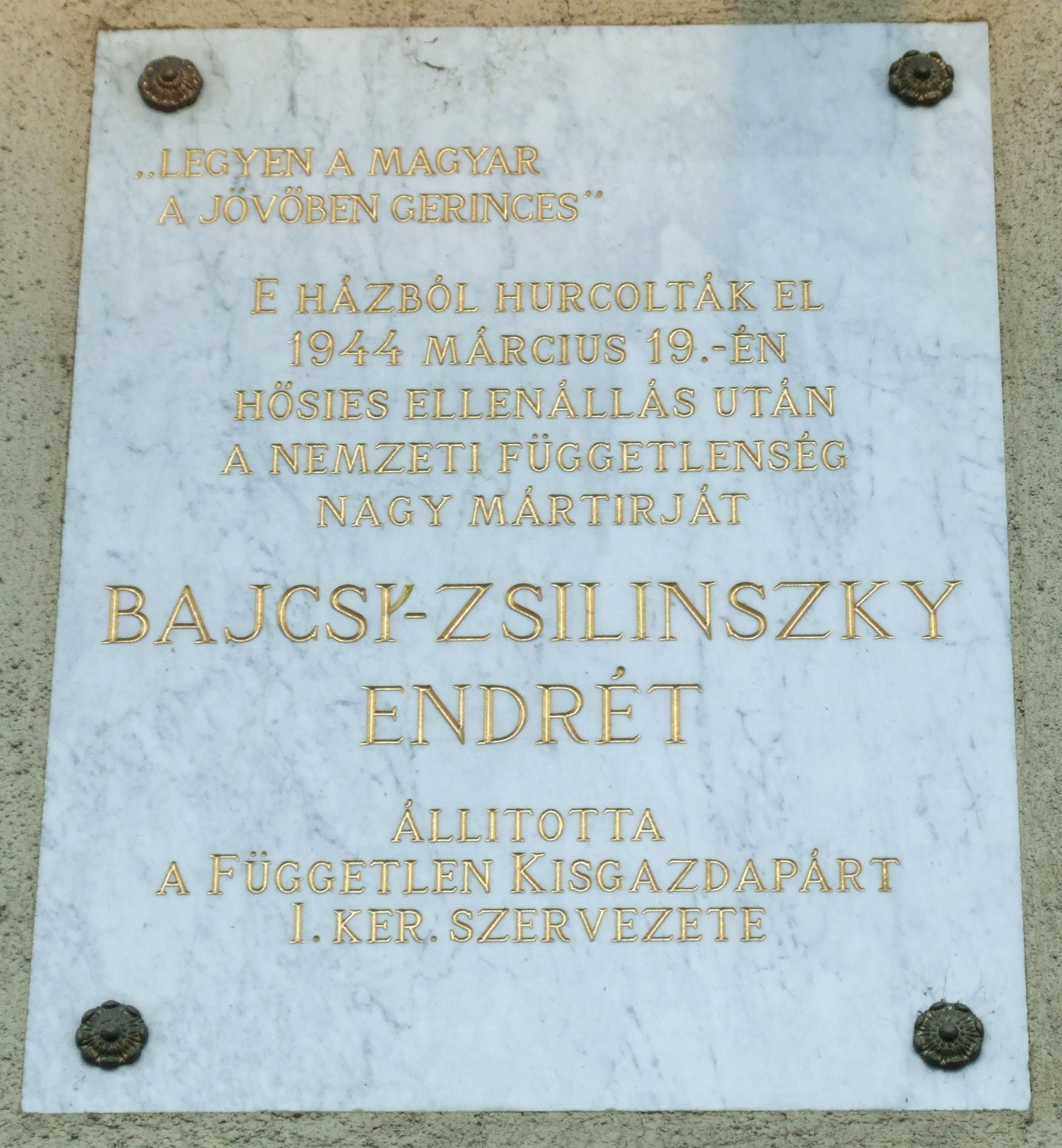
Plaque dedicated by the Freeholders Party, at his last place of residence at I. Attila út 37 in Buda.

== Memorials ==
Due to his anti-Nazi stance, he was honoured by the government of the post-war Hungarian People's Republic, and his nationalist and anti-Nazi theories still have adherents.

Bajcsy-Zsilinszky street, in the centre of Budapest is named after him, as is Bajcsy-Zsilinszky út station on the M1 line of the Budapest Metro.

Streets are also named after him in Baja, Balassagyarmat, Balatonalmádi, Balatonfüred, Debrecen, Győr, Eger, Esztergom, Kaposvár, Kecskemét, Kiskunfélegyháza, Kiskőrös, Környe, Kőszeg, Miskolc, Pécs, Szentes, Tokaj and in the inner city of Tatabánya. Also, the city of Novi Sad (Serbia) named a street after him in gratitude for raising his voice in Hungarian parliament against the mass killing of Vojvodina Serbs, Jews, and Roma by Hungarian soldiers and gendarmes in 1942.

An interesting carved image in a granite slab in Budapest is dedicated to him.

== Works ==
- A Singular Path: The Hungarian peasant farmer (Egyetlen út: A Magyar Paraszt)
- National Rebirth and the Press (Nemzeti újjászületés és sajtó)
- New Year's Open Letter to the Electorate of the Derecske Electoral District (Újévi nyílt levele a derecskei választókerület polgáraihoz)
- National Radicalism (Nemzeti radikalizmus)
- German World in Hungary (Német világ Magyarországon)
- King Matthias (Mátyás király)
- Our Place and Fate in Europe (Helyünk és sorsunk Európában)
- Transylvania: Past and Future (Erdély, a Mult és a Jövö)

== Sources ==
- Károly Vigh: Endre Bajcsy-Zsilinszky (1886–1944)- A Man With A Mission. Published by (Szépirodalmi Könyvkiadó, Budapest, 1992) ISBN 963-15-4397-8. (Vigh Károly: Bajcsy-Zsilinszky Endre (1886–1944) / A küldetéses ember (Szépirodalmi Könyvkiadó, Budapest, 1992) ISBN 963-15-4397-8)
- Halász, Iván : Tzv. lojálni Slováci v dualistickom Uhorsku ("dobrí Slováci", "úradní Tóthi", uhorskí vlastenci, maďaróni a tí druhí....) In: Regionálna a národná identita v maďarskej a slovenskej histórii 18. - 20. storočia = Regionális és nemzeti identitásformák a 18 - 20. századi magyar és a szlovák történelemben. [Eds.]: Šutaj, Štefan - Szarka, László. Prešov, Universum 2007, s. 91-102. Rés. maď. s. 102-103 Az ún. lojális szlovákok a dualizmuskori Magyarországon ("jó szlovákok", "hivatalos tórok", magyarországi hazafiak, maďarónok és a többiek...); angl. s. 103 So-called loyal Slovak in Hungary during the Dual Monarchy ("Good Slovaks", "Official Tots", Hungarian patriots, "Magyarized Slovaks", and others...) ISBN 978-80-89046-43-0
- Klimó, Árpád von (2018). Remembering Cold Days: The 1942 Massacre of Novi Sad and Hungarian Politics and Society, 1942-1989. Pittsburgh: University of Pittsburgh Press. ISBN 0822965453.
- Cornelius, Deborah S (2011). Hungary in World War II: Caught in the Cauldron. New York: Fordham University Press. ISBN 978-0823233441.
- Nagy-Talavera, Nicholas M. (1970). The Green Shirts and the Others A History of Fascism in Hungary and Rumania. Stanford: Hoover Institution Press. ISBN 9780817918514.
- >Porter, Anna (2009). Kasztner's Train The True Story of Rezso Kasztner, Unknown Hero of the Holocaust. Vancouver: Douglas and McIntyre. ISBN 9781926685977.
