= Bajcsy-Zsilinszky út metro station =

Budapest metro station

Bajcsy-Zsilinszky út
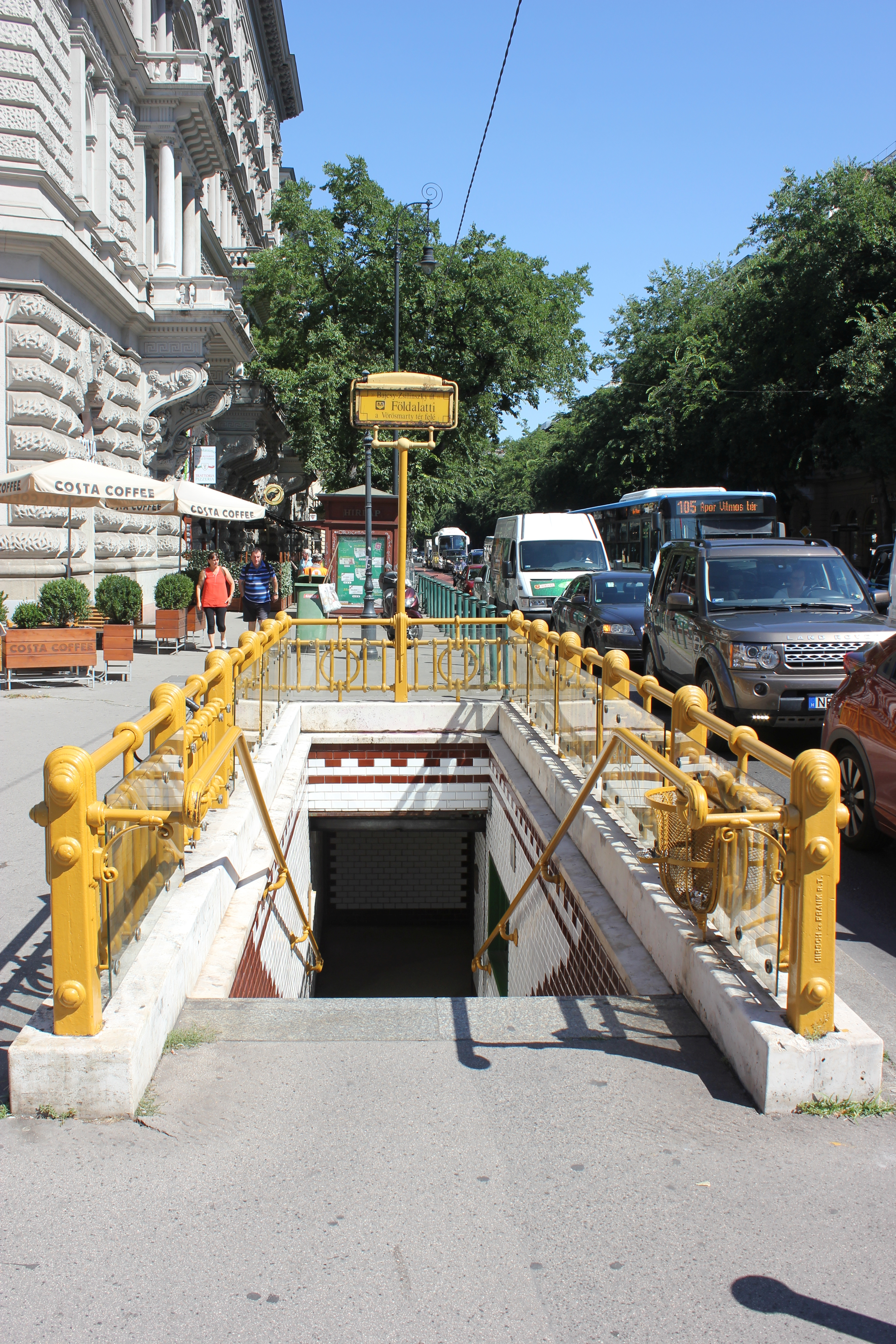
- Station entrance from Andrássy Avenue

General information
- Location: Budapest; Hungary
- Coordinates: 47°29′58″N 19°03′18″E
- System: Budapest Metro station
- Platforms: 2 side platforms

Construction
- Structure type: cut-and-cover underground

History
- Opened: 2 May 1896
- Rebuilt: 1970

Services
Preceding station	Budapest Metro	Following station
Deák Ferenc tér towards Vörösmarty tér	Line 1	Opera towards Mexikói út
Location

Bajcsy-Zsilinszky út is a station of the yellow M1 (Millennium Underground) line of the Budapest Metro. It is situated under Andrássy Avenue close to its junction with Bajcsy-Zsilinszky street. It was formerly named Váczy körút station.

The station was opened on 2 May 1896 as part of the inaugural section of the Budapest Metro, between Vörösmarty tér and Széchenyi fürdő. This section, known as the Millennium Underground Railway, was the first metro system in continental Europe. In 2002, it was included into the World Heritage Site "Budapest, including the Banks of the Danube, the Buda Castle Quarter and Andrássy Avenue".

The station is named after Endre Bajcsy-Zsilinszky a member of the Independent Smallholders, Agrarian Workers and Civic Party and leader of the resistance who was executed toward the end of the Second World War.

The station has two side platforms, each with its own independent access from the street.

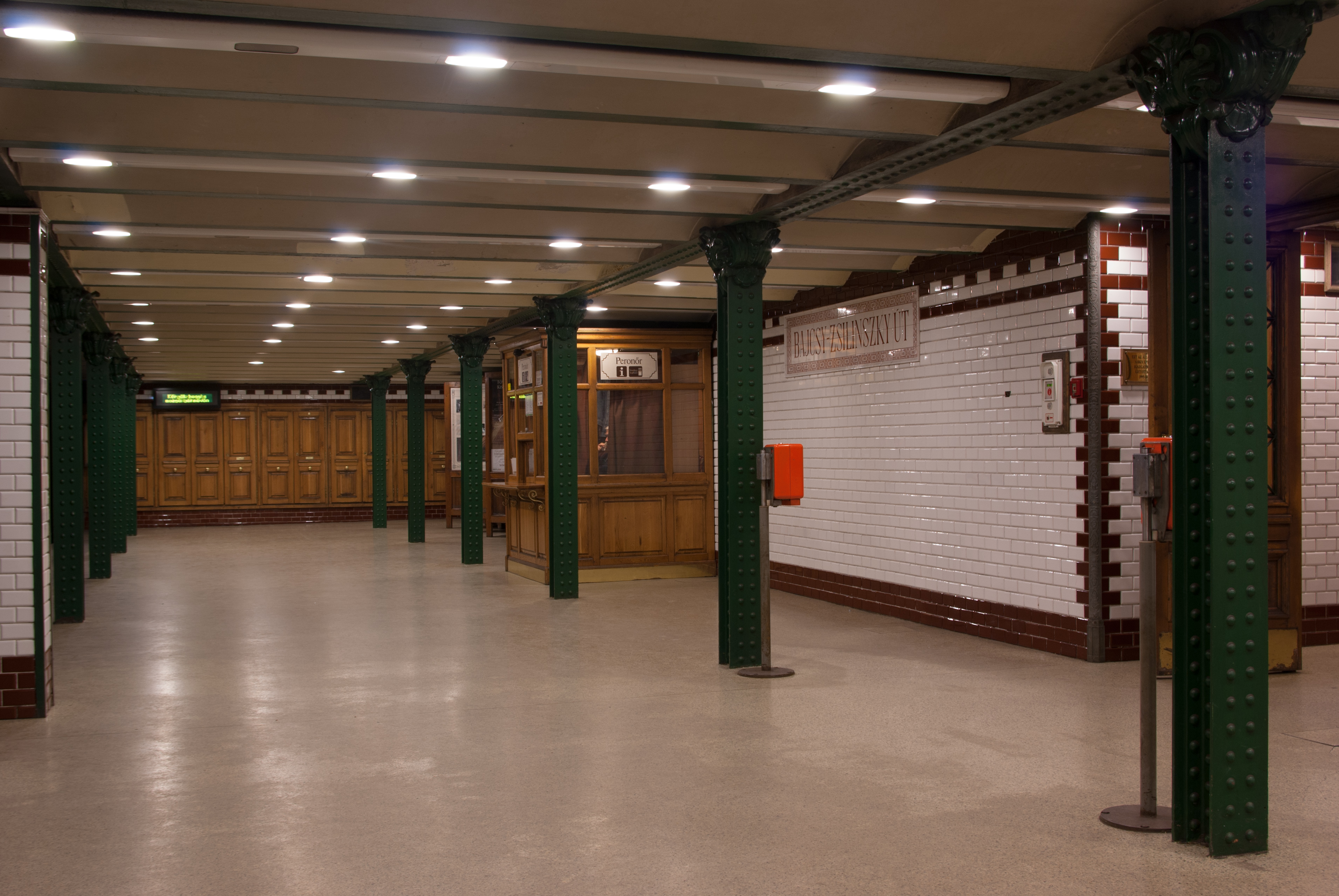
Interior with station manager's office

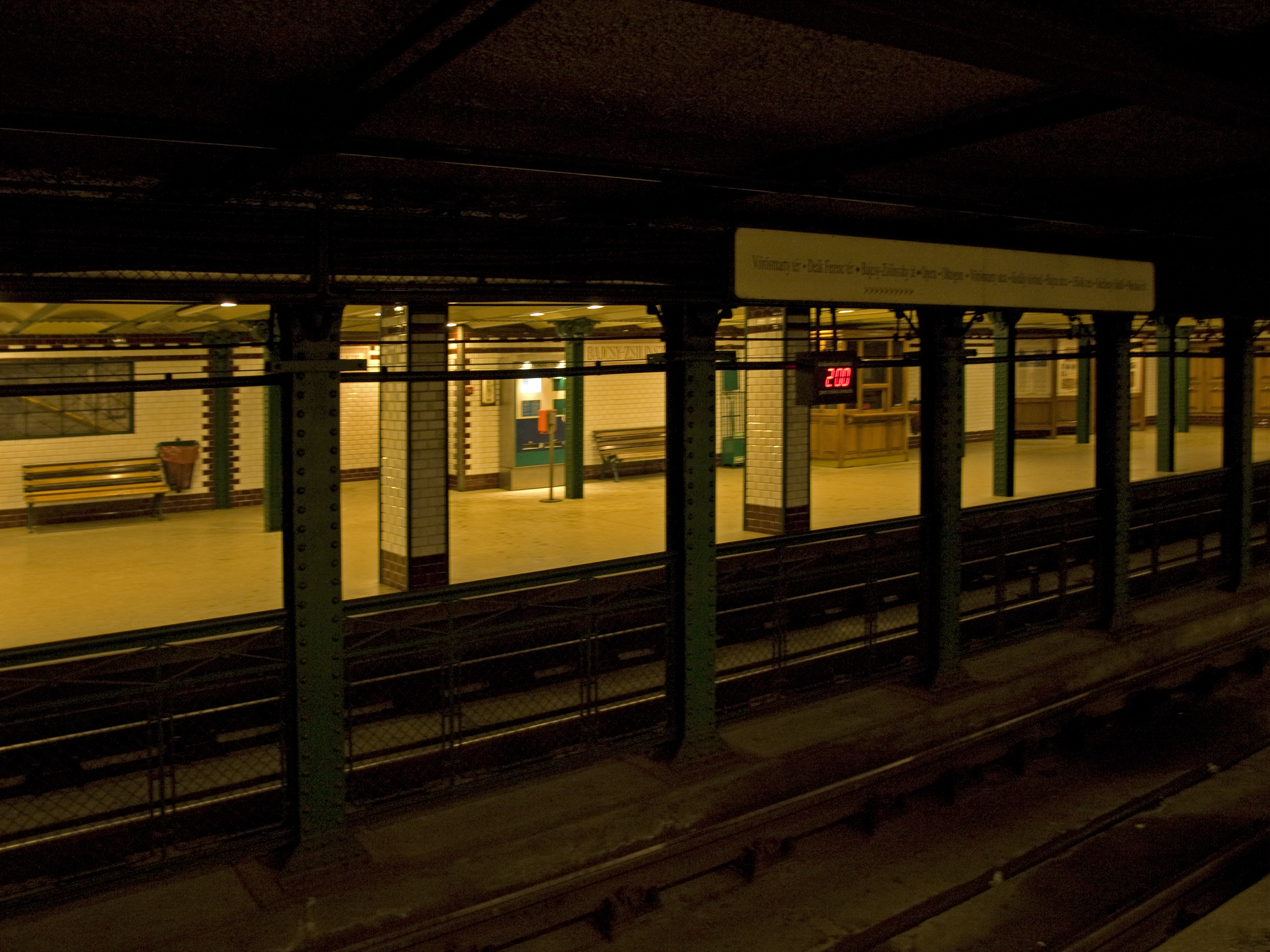
Platforms and rails

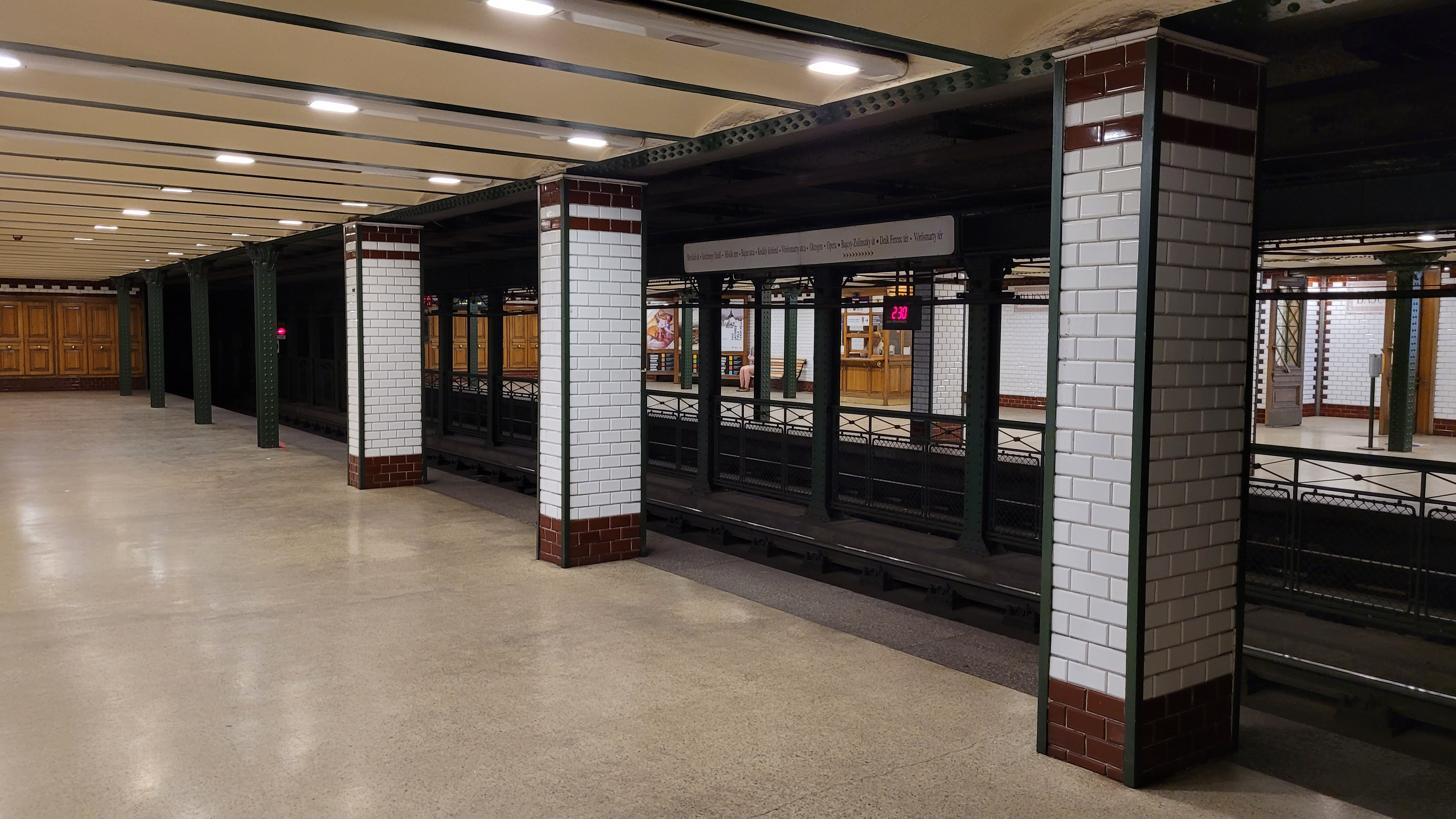
The station platforms

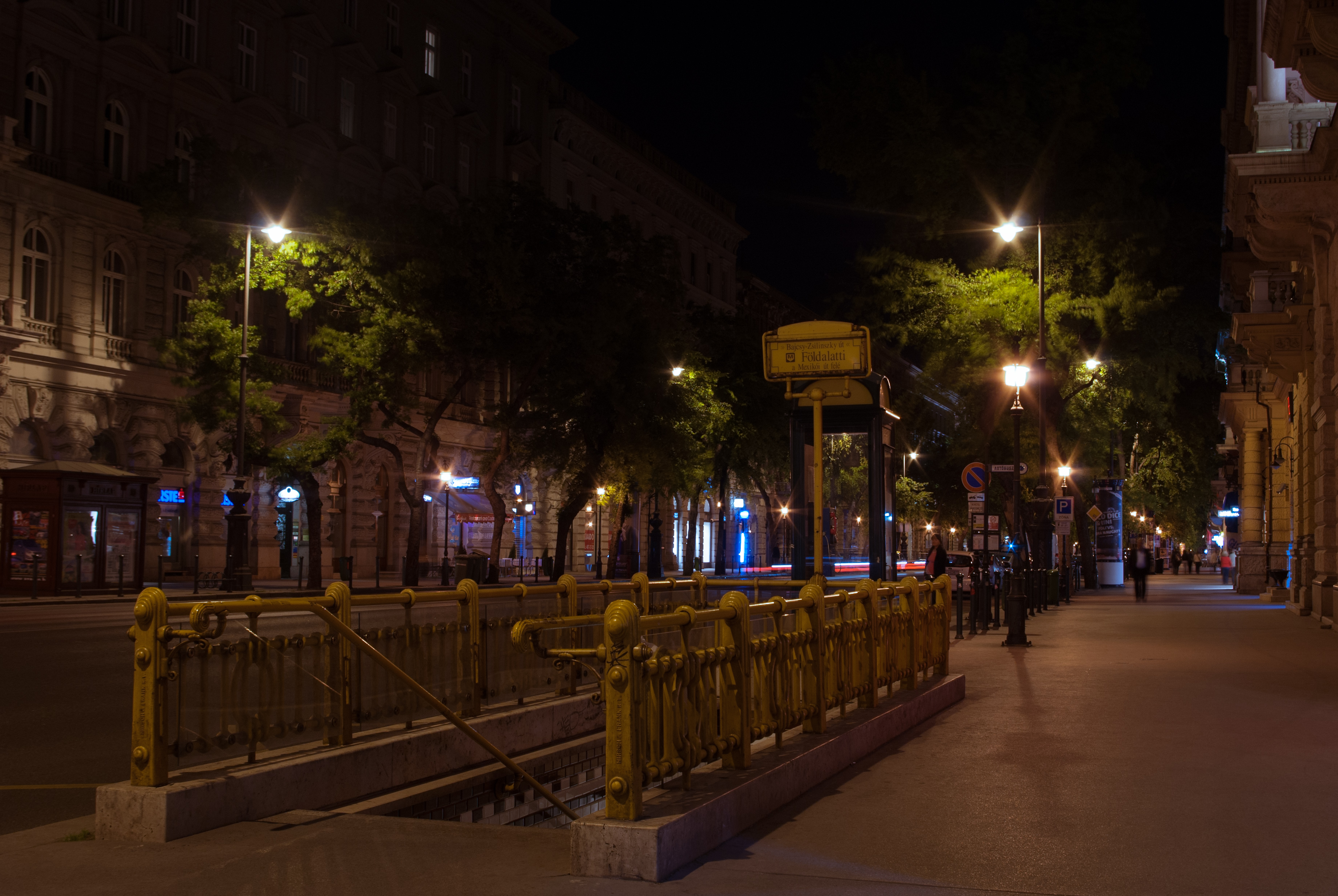
Entrance at night

== Connections ==
- Bus: 9, 105, 210, 210B
