= Szabad Nép =

Hungarian daily newspaper, 1942 to 1956

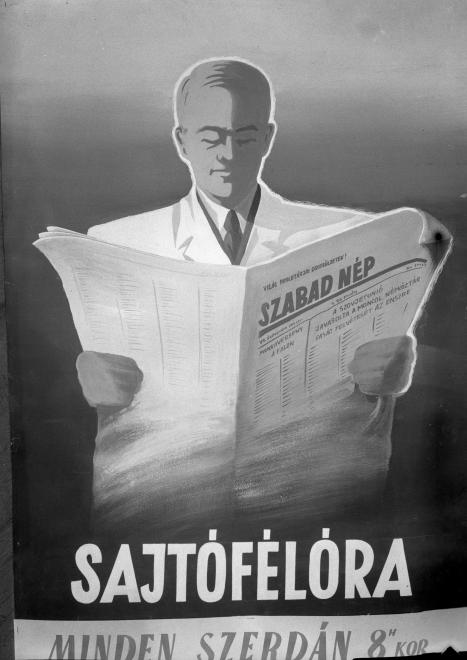
- Poster from the press hour of the Szabad Nép daily, January 1, 1950
- Type: Daily newspaper
- Format: Broadsheet
- Owner(s): Hungarian Communist Party; Hungarian Working People's Party
- Founded: 1 February 1942
- Ceased publication: 29 October 1956
- Political alignment: Communist
- Language: Hungarian
- Headquarters: Budapest
- Country: Hungary
- ISSN: 0200-7428

Szabad Nép (Hungarian pronunciation: [ˈsɒbɒd ˈneːp], English: Free People) was a Hungarian daily newspaper which was the central organ of the Hungarian Communist Party (1942–1948) and from February 1948 the Hungarian Working People's Party. The newspaper was the predecessor to Népszabadság.

== History ==
The first issue published on February 1, 1942. Its editor-in-chief was the anti-fascist resistance fighter Ferenc Rózsa and the editorial was written by Zoltán Schönherz. During the Second World War, Hungarian newspapers could only be published with serious restrictions due to press censorship and the worsening paper shortage. As one of the leaders of the MKP, Endre Ságvári oversaw the agitation and propaganda activities of the MKP, including the illegal printing press, which produced flyers and even the first issue of the newspaper Szabad Nép. MKP members working in different printing houses, or sympathizers acquired them and also bought parts. After the printing press was put into operation, Endre Ságvári visited the printers at their apartment and agreed on contact details, passwords, etc. At that time, the people performing the various tasks of the MKP were illegal. At the end of 1944, the printing house of the newspaper was discovered by the Gestapo and multiple members of its editorial board were arrested and sent to concentration camps. In December 1944, leaflets were printed and distributed in another illegal printing house. The printing house worked for a short time, because it was also attacked by Arrow Cross members and liquidated in an armed struggle.

On March 25, 1945, the first legal issue of Szabad Nép was published in the Soviet-controlled part of Hungary. For the next ten years, the newspaper was published daily, being the main print mouthpiece first of the Communist Party, and after its unification in 1948 with the Social Democrats, the Hungarian Working People's Party.

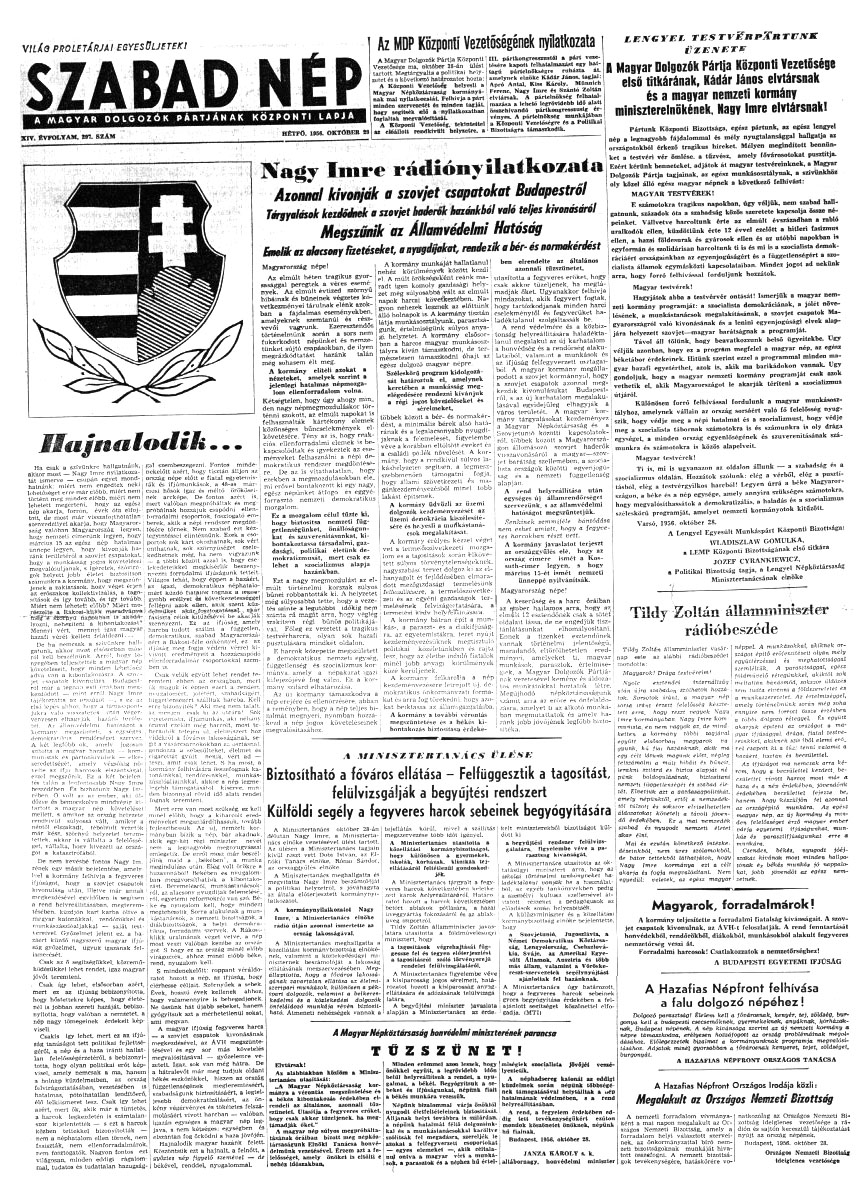
Last issue (Vol. XIV, No. 297, [29 October 1956])

During the events of the 1956 Hungarian uprising, the newspaper headquarters was taken over by the rebels and the newspaper started to publish pro-reform articles. Despite the actual defection to the side of the rebels, the newspaper was too strongly compromised by its previous support for the Rákosi leadership and was directly associated with it. From October 29, no new issues of Szabad Nép had been published. On November 2, the day after the formation of the Hungarian Socialist Workers' Party, publication of the newspaper was finally discontinued. In its place, a new newspaper, Népszabadság, was launched.
