= Bajcsy-Zsilinszky út =

Coordinates: 47°30′12.7″N 19°3′17.9″E

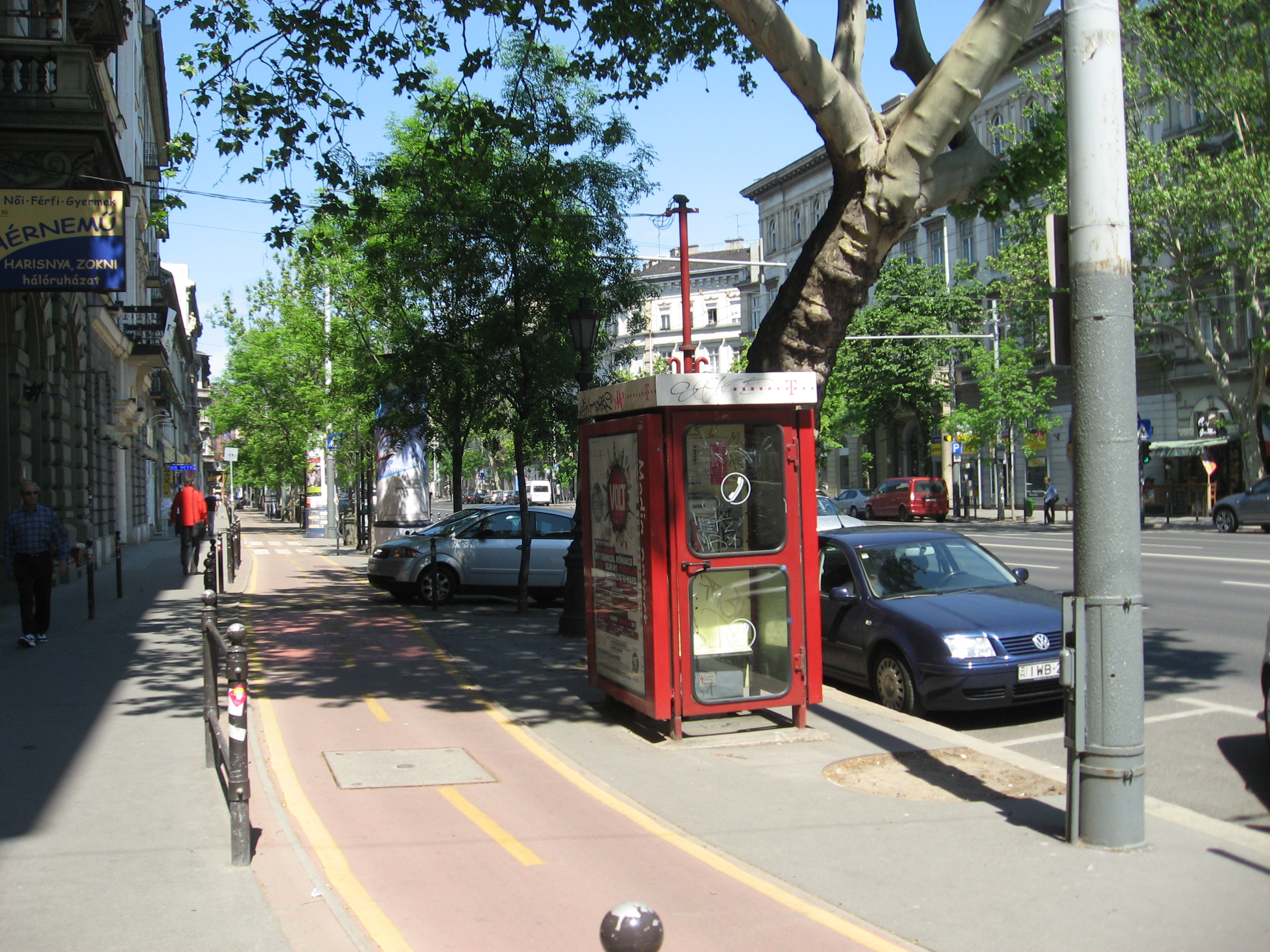
Bajcsy-Zsilinszky street

Bajcsy-Zsilinszky street (Hungarian: Bajcsy-Zsilinszky út) is a principal street in the centre of the Hungarian capital city of Budapest. It runs north from Deák Ferenc square to Nyugati square outside Nyugati railway station. Towards its southern end it is joined by Andrássy Avenue, and Bajcsy-Zsilinszky út metro station is located at this junction.

The street is named after Endre Bajcsy-Zsilinszky a member of the Independent Smallholders, Agrarian Workers and Civic Party and leader of the resistance who was executed toward the end of the Second World War.
