= Sopronkőhida =

Village in northwestern Hungary

Coordinates: 47°43′23.85″N 16°37′15.00″E

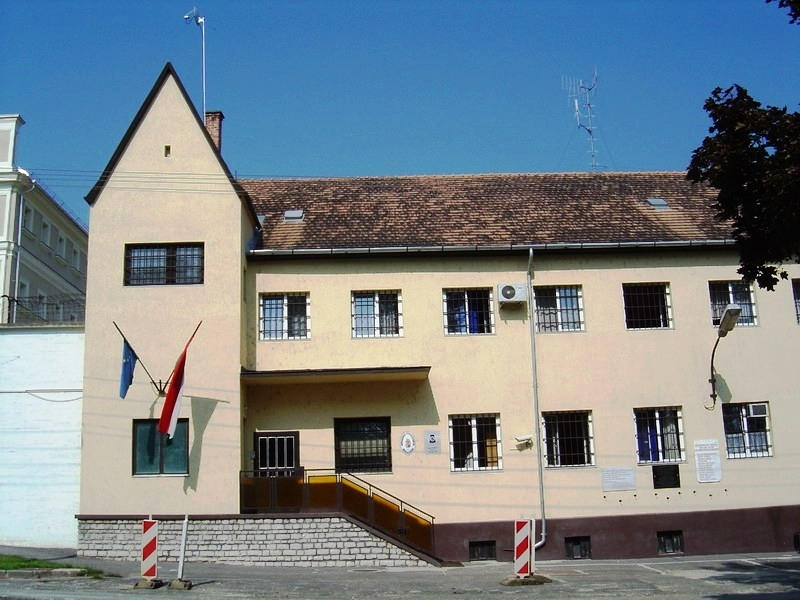
Sopronkőhida prison entrance

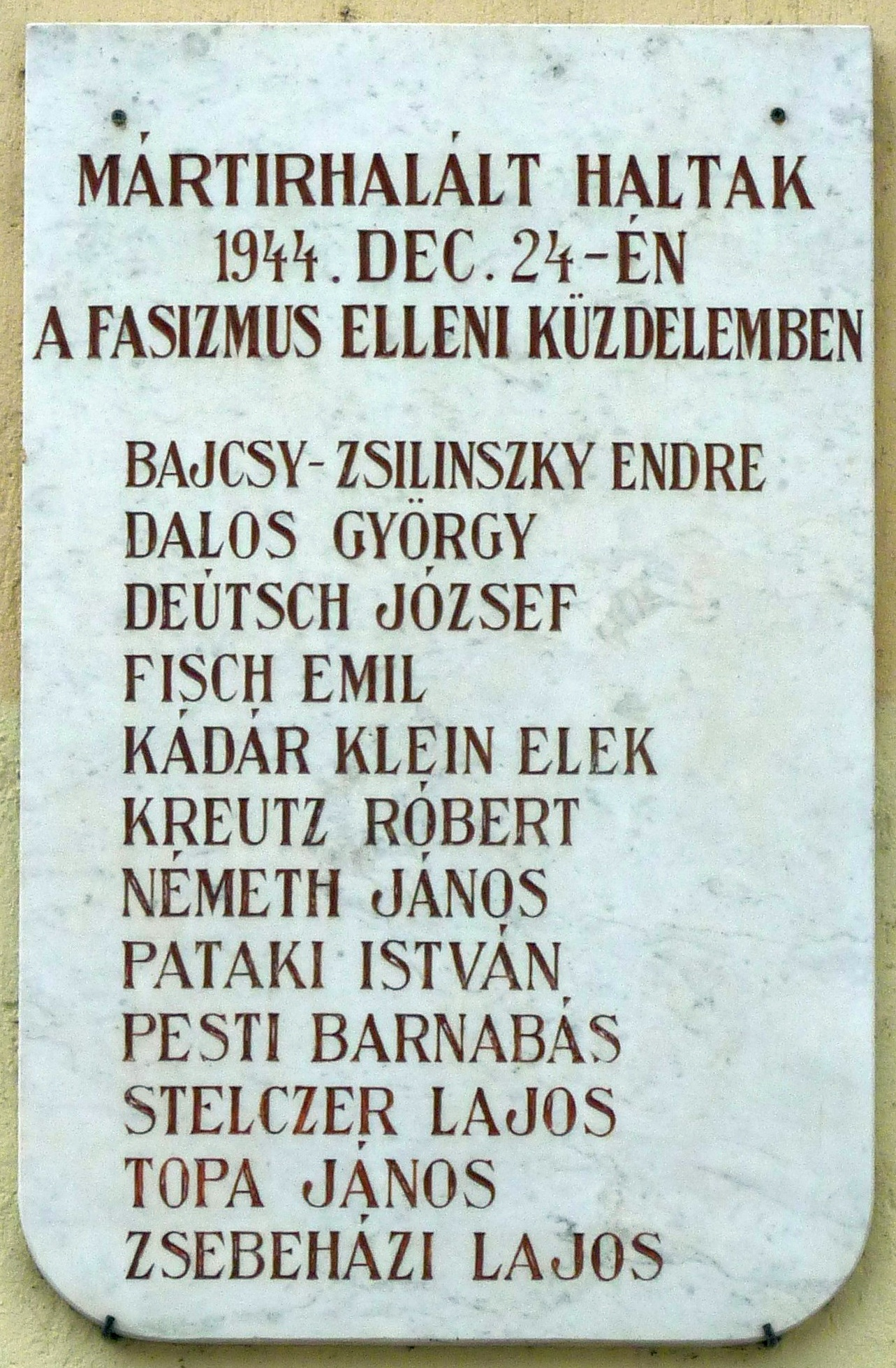
Sopronkőhida martyrs plaque

Sopronkőhida is an area in Sopron, Győr–Moson–Sopron County, Hungary. It is 5 km south of the border with Austria.

== Significance ==
The village is the location of an infamous Hungarian military prison. Its notoriety stems from its use in 1944, by the Nyilas government to incarcerate, torture, and execute its opponents. Famous prisoners, like General Vilmos Nagy of Nagybaczon, and Endre Bajcsy-Zsilinszky, were imprisoned here, with Bajcsy-Zsilinszky executed in late 1944. After World War II, the prison served as the holding facility for the Allied Military Tribunals until 1947, when it reverted again to serve as a prison until 1951. Prior to World War II, it served as a workhouse, and after 1951, the buildings were used for successive commercial enterprises.

The Austrian border near the village was the site of the 1989 Pan-European Picnic breach by East Germans gathered to escape to Western Europe, and which precipitated the collapse of the Iron Curtain.
