= Szabad Szó =

Former Hungarian newspaper

Szabad szó, August 5, 1945

Szabad szó (Hungarian pronunciation: [ˈsɒbɒd ˈsoː], 'Free Word') was a Hungarian newspaper that served as the central organ of the National Peasants Party.

The paper was published daily from April 19, 1945 to June 4, 1950, and weekly from June 1950 to February 1952. The last issue was published on February 3, 1952.
