= János Kiss =

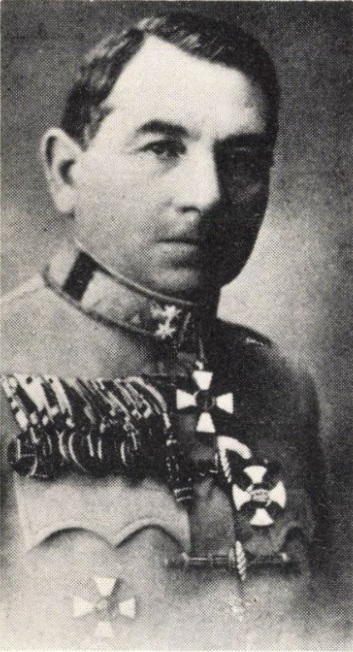
- Born: 24 March 1883; Erdőszentgyörgy, Austria-Hungary
- Died: 8 December 1944 (aged 61); Budapest, Hungary
- Cause of death: Execution by hanging
- Military career
- Allegiance: Austria-Hungary; Kingdom of Hungary
- Service years: 1902–1939
- Rank: Lieutenant general

János Kiss (24 March 1883 – 8 December 1944) was a Hungarian military officer and the military leader of the Hungarian Committee for Liberation and National Uprising (in Hungarian: Magyar Nemzeti Felkelés Felszabadító Bizottsága). On 22 November 1944, he was arrested by the pro-Nazi Hungarian secret police on a meeting of that committee along with other resistance leaders. He was executed on 8 December 1944.

== Biography ==
He was born into a Székely military family. He was graduated from the Military High School of Nagyszeben in 1902. After the First World War he became a teacher at the Military High School in Kőszeg, after that the commander of a bicycle infantry brigade. He ended his career as the Inspector General of the Infantry. He retired from the army in 1939, as a sign of protest against the pro-German political orientation of Hungary. He lived in Kőszeg afterwards.

In 1943 Endre Bajcsy-Zsilinszky advised the Regent to appoint János Kiss to Defence Minister, but Horthy chose Lajos Csatay instead. Lt. Gen. Kiss was the member of the Military Tribunal organized to investigate the Újvidék massacre. After the occupation of Hungary by Nazi German forces, he gave a military plan to Horthy, in which he urged the Hungarian Army to join forces with the National Liberation Army of Tito.

After the Arrow Cross Party's coup he joined the Hungarian resistance movement, and he became the leader of the General Staff of the Hungarian Committee for Liberation and National Uprising. Because the time and place of their meeting was betrayed to the police by Lt. Tibor Mikulich; Lt. Gen. Kiss along with other leaders of the resistance movement was arrested by the Nazis on 22 November 1944, and executed by hanging in the Military Prison on the Margit Boulevard on 8 December 1944.

After the war several streets and schools were named after him in Hungary. He was buried in Kőszeg, his grave is a National Memorial Site.
