= Emil Gerbeaud =

Swiss-born Hungarian chocolatier (1854–1919)

- Émile Gerbeaud
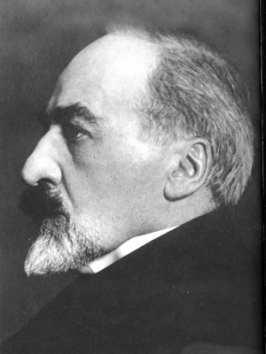
- Born: Émile Gerbeaud; 22 February 1854; Carouge, Canton of Geneva, Switzerland
- Died: 8 November 1919 (aged 65); Budapest, Hungary
- Occupation: confectioner
- Board member of: CEO Café Gerbeaud
- Spouse: Esther Ramseyer
- Children: Gabrielle; Marcelle; Erzsébet Kamilla; Ilona Janka; Margit Magdolna

Emil Gerbeaud (French: Émile Gerbeaud, Carouge, Canton of Geneva, Switzerland, 22 February 1854 – Budapest, Hungary, 8 November 1919) was a Swiss-born Hungarian confectioner, chocolate producer, industrialist and entrepreneur. Several famous traditional Hungarian cakes were first introduced by him like the macskanyelv (transl. cat tongue), the konyakos meggy (transl. cognac sour cherry), the csokoládé drazsé (transl. chocolate dragees) and he was the first in Hungary who sold French cakes filled with custard. The zserbó cake, a well-known product of the Café Gerbeaud is named after him, although it was not available in his lifetime.

== Life ==
=== Early life ===
Émile Gerbeaud was born in Carouge, Canton of Geneva, Switzerland on 22 February 1854 into a Roman Catholic merchant, confectioner family. His father, Simon-Jean-François Gerbeaud was a French confectioner and trader. His mother was Jeanne-Marie Gros.

During his younger years he was trained in the family business and later worked in several confectioneries in Germany, England and France.

In 1879 Gerbeaud opened his own confectionery in Saint-Étienne, Loire Department, France.

=== Café Gerbeaud ===
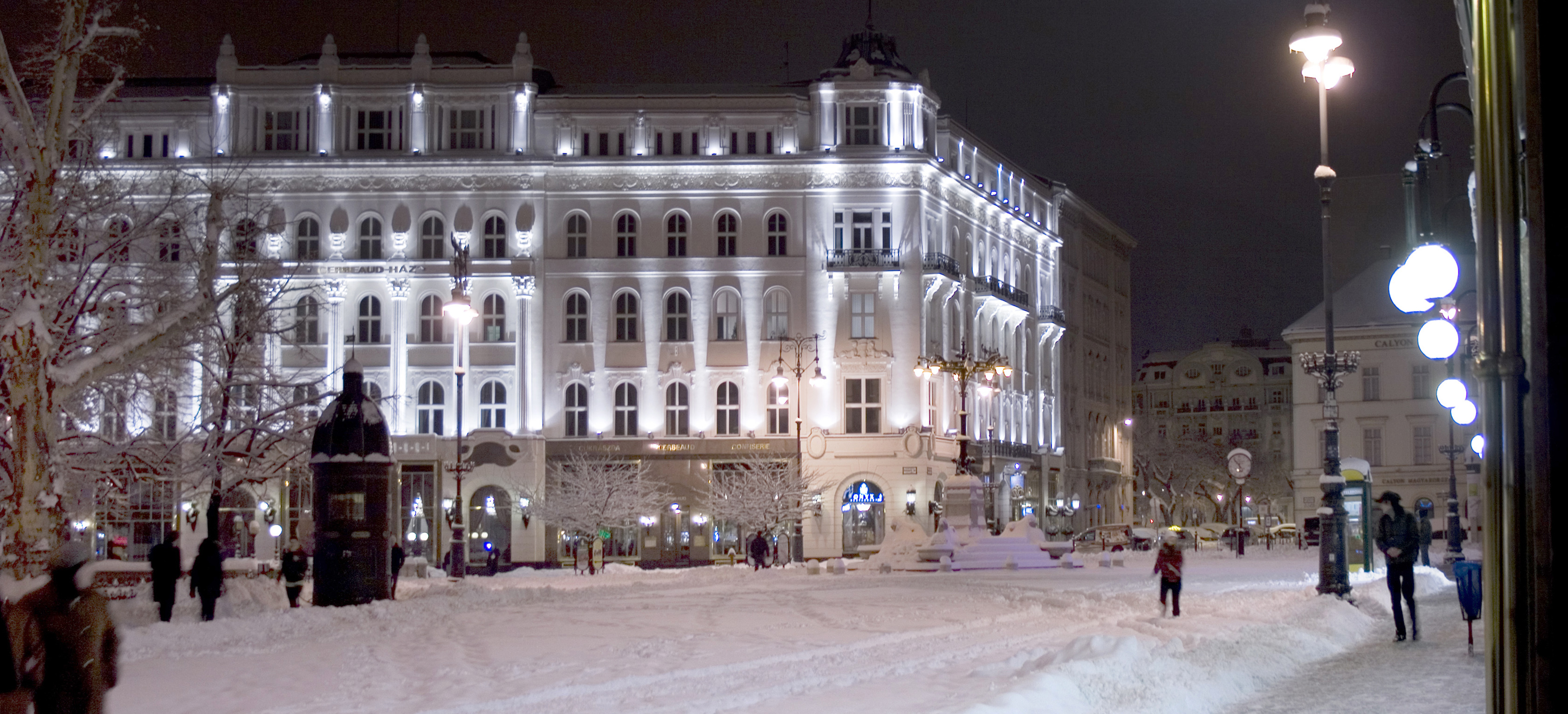
The Gerbeaud House (Gerbeaud-ház) on Vörösmarty Square in Budapest in winter

In 1884 he came to Budapest, Hungary at the request of the famous Hungarian confectioner Henrik Kugler and became shareholder and CEO of the Henrik Kugler's Confectionery (Kugler Henrik Cukrászdája) (which later became his own company under the name Café Gerbeaud).

In 1886 he expanded the company with a new chocolate factory.

He gained reputation for the Hungarian confectionery industry and won the gold medal for his products on the World Fairs in 1898 and 1900. In recognition of this he received the Franz-Joseph Order and the French Honorary Order. He was elected President of the Division of Sugar Production of the Chamber of Industry and Commerce of Hungary in 1903.

In 1904 he moved the chocolate factory to Duna Street. In 1907 he became president of the international bakery and confectionery exhibition.

In 1896 at the Millennium Exhibition he demonstrated his modern fabrication method of chocolate which brought him a reputation.

In 1907 he bought and renewed a chocolate factory in Fiume, Austria-Hungary (today Rijeka, Croatia).

=== Death ===
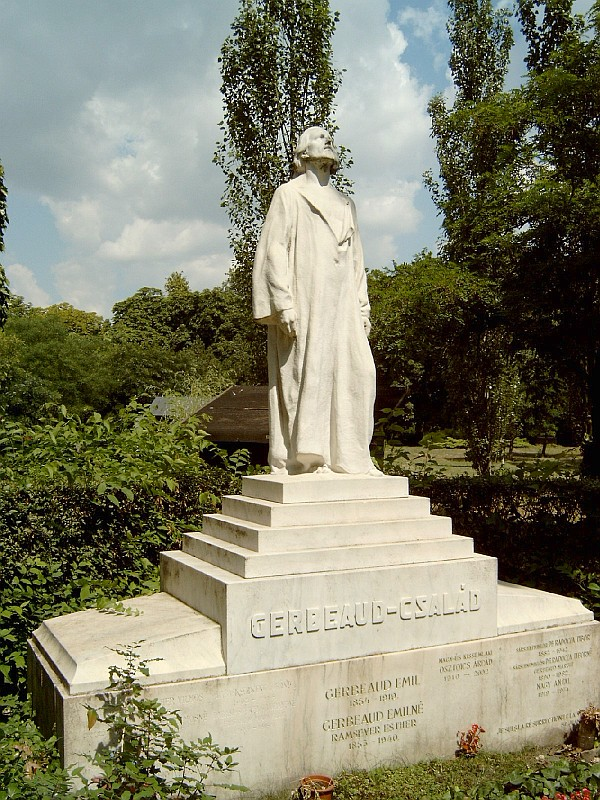
Emil Gerbeaud's grave in the Kerepesi Cemetery

After his death on 9 November 1919 his wife led the company successfully further until 1940.

In 1948 the communist regime deprived the heirs, the five daughters of Emil Gerbeaud, of the shares of the company and they confiscated it.

Since 1984 the company is again under the name 'Café Gerbeaud' registered and since 1995 owned by the German billionaire, Erwin Franz Müller, the owner of the Müller drugstores.

== Personal life ==
He married Esther Ramseyer (1853 – 7 February 1940), the daughter of a Swiss Calvinist chocolatefabric owner and confectioner from Saint-Imier, Canton of Bern, Switzerland. They had together five daughters.

- Gabrielle (?–?)
- Marcella (Budapest, 14 January 1883 – 30 January 1971)
- Erzsébet Kamilla (Budapest, 15 November 1885 – ?)
- Ilona Janka (Budapest, 23 April 1888 – ?)
- Margit Magdolna (Budapest, 23 October 1890 – )

== See also ==
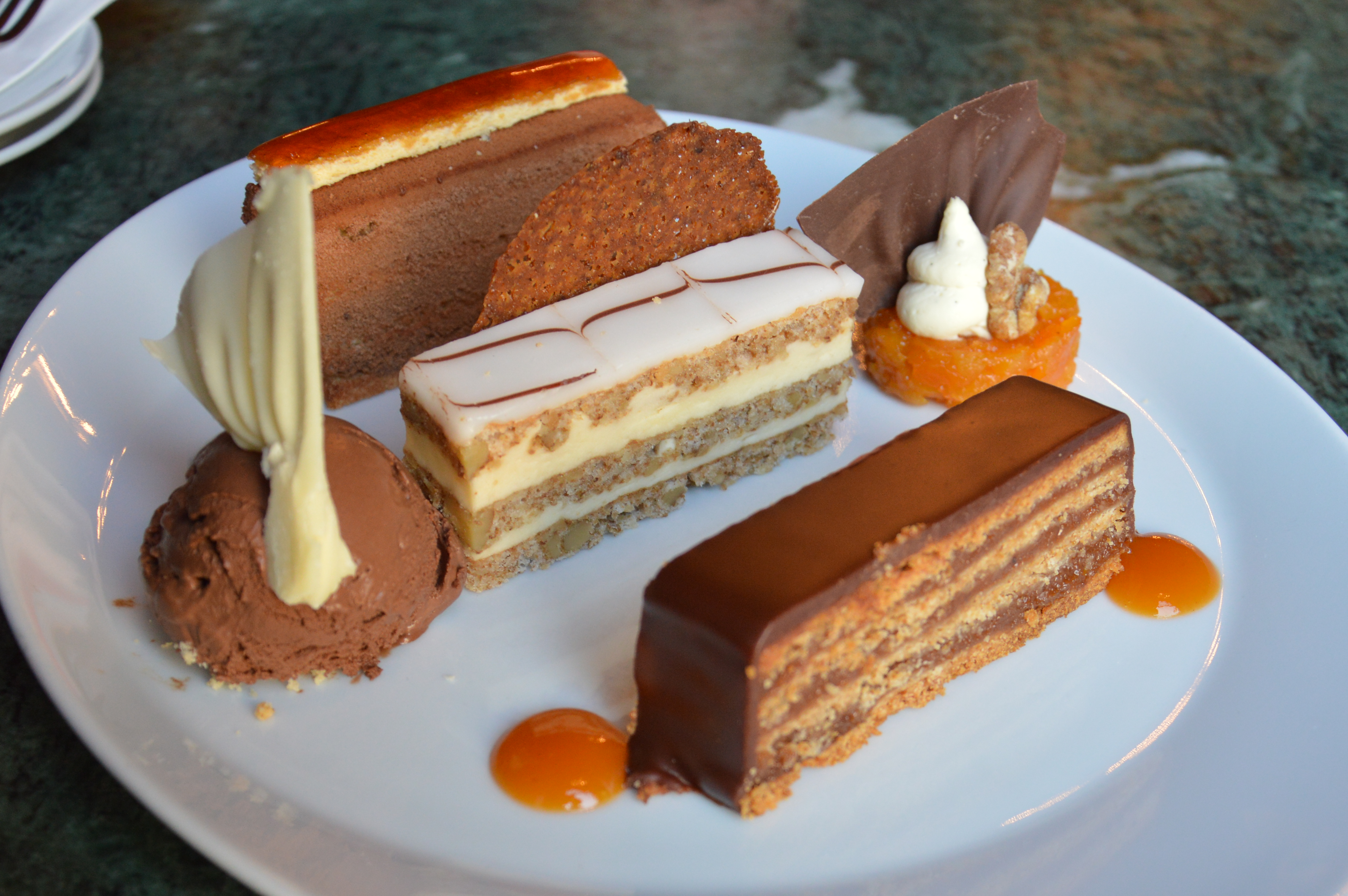
Dobos cake made by Café Gerbeaud

- Café Gerbeaud

== Sources ==
- ANTAL, Zsuzsanna - Ki sütött először süteményt a Gerbeaud-ban? Kugler Henrik története. (7 September 2017, Forbes Hungary)
