= Christa de Carouge =

Swiss fashion designer

- Born: 6 August 1936; Basel
- Died: 17 January 2018; Zurich
- Citizenship: Switzerland
- Occupation: fashion designer
- Years active: 1978-2018

Christa de Carouge (born Christa Furrer, 1936-2018) was a Swiss fashion designer.

== Biography ==
Christa Furrer was born in 1936 in Basel, Switzerland. Her grandparents both worked in a silk ribbons factory. Her father was a cook, and her mother was a seamstress and taught her to sew. Christa Furrer was the oldest of five siblings. Her brother Urs became an artist.

She started working in a clothing store (Monsieur Rudi) in Geneva owned by her husband. After her divorce, in 1978, she created a couture shop in Carouge and endorsed the name Christa de Carouge. She then moved to Zürich where she continued to design clothes. She preferred not to use her last name "Furrer" because it sounded exactly like the connotative word "führer".

She died on 17 January 2018.

== Style ==
She conceived comfortable clothes designed for home and travel. She rejected the world of fashion. Mainly inspired by the punk and underground cultures, she favored dark colors, which earned her the nicknames "Die Frau in Schwarz" or "Grande Dame der Schweizer Mode". Her approach to couture was deeply rooted in interior design and architecture (including Le Corbusier's approach to modern home design).

In 2003, she temporarily introduced red and yellow in her collections.

== Exhibitions ==
- Noir Nero Black Schwarz, Musée des Arts Décoratifs de Lausanne, June-September 1999
- Kunsthaus de Zug, November-December 2017
- Post-mortem retrospective, Carouge Museum, October-December 2018

== Awards ==
- 2010: Glory-Verleihung in the Style category

== Filmography ==
- Christa de Carouge - La dame en noir (2019), 55-minute documentary by Remo Hegglin (trailer on Vimeo)
