= Carouge =

- Municipality
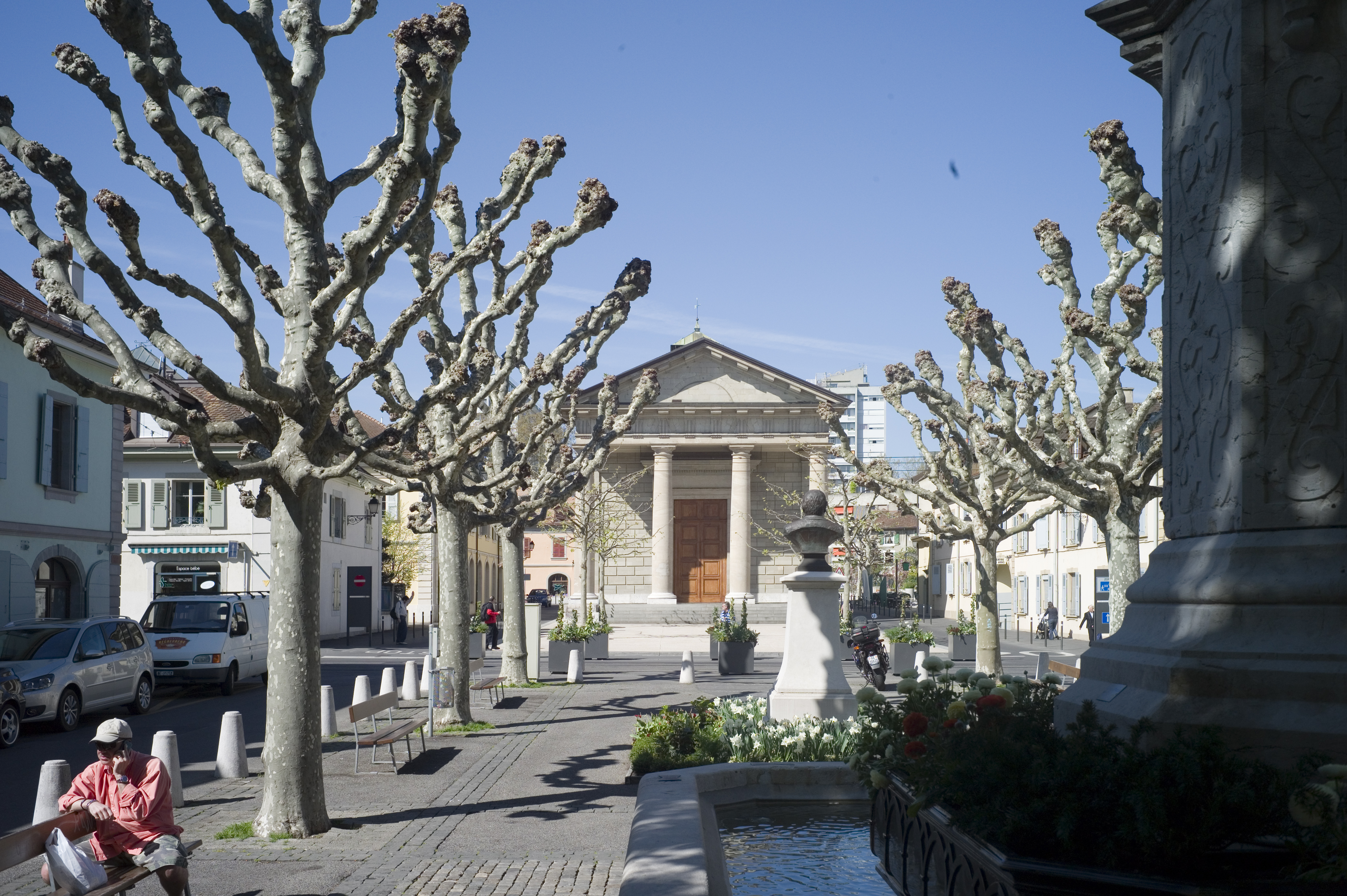

- Flag Coat of arms
- Location of Carouge
- Location within Switzerland Location within Canton of Geneva
- Coordinates: 46°11′N 6°08′E
- Country: Switzerland
- Canton: Geneva
- District: n.a.

Government
  - Executive: Conseil administratif with 3 members
  - Mayor: Maire (list)
  - Parliament: Conseil municipal with 31 members

Area
  - Total: 2.70 km^{2} (1.04 sq mi)
- Elevation: 386 m (1,266 ft)

Population (December 2020)
  - Total: 22,536
  - Density: 8,350/km^{2} (21,600/sq mi)
- Time zone: UTC+01:00 (CET)
  - Summer (DST): UTC+02:00 (CEST)
- Postal code: 1227
- SFOS number: 6608
- ISO 3166 code: CH-GE
- Surrounded by: Geneva (Genève), Lancy, Plan-les-Ouates, Troinex, Veyrier
- Website: carouge.ch

Carouge (French pronunciation: [kaʁuʒ]; Arpitan: Carrojo) is a municipality in the Canton of Geneva, Switzerland.

== History ==
Aerial view (1963)

Carouge is first mentioned in the Early Middle Ages as Quadruvium and Quatruvio. In 1248, it was mentioned as Carrogium while in the 14th century, it was known as Quarrouiz or Quarroggi. In 1445, it was mentioned as Quaroggio. The current city was built by Victor Amadeus III of Sardinia, King of Sardinia and Duke of Savoy, starting in 1760–70. It obtained the status of city in 1786.

Carouge was taken by revolutionary France in 1792, apparently with considerable local support. During the Napoleonic wars, in 1814, Carouge was reincorporated into the Kingdom of Sardinia following a brief occupation by Austria. The Treaty of Turin (1816) transferred Carouge to the Canton of Geneva and it therefore became part of the Swiss Confederation.

== Geography ==
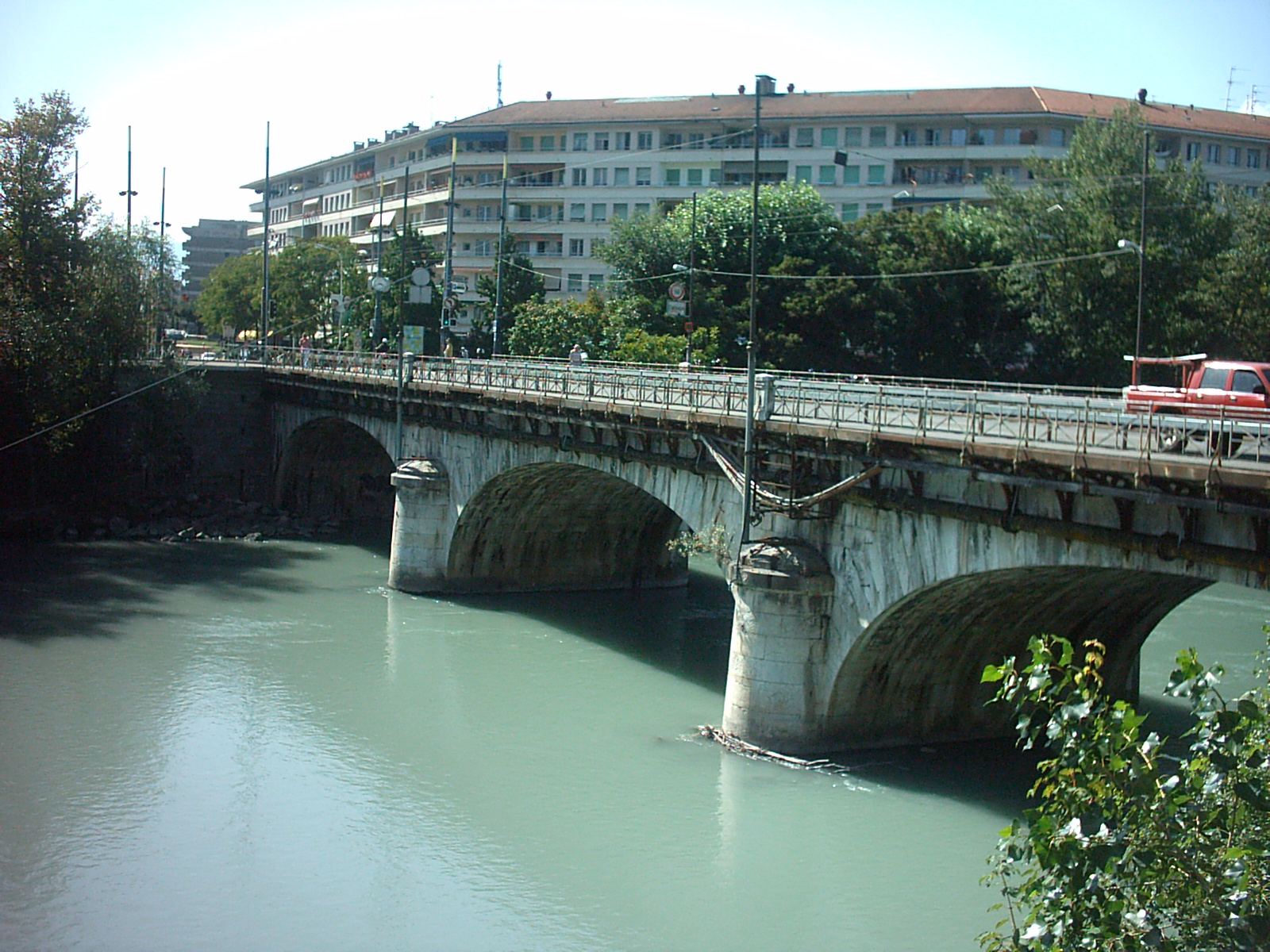
Bridge to Carouge over the Arve River

Carouge has an area, as of 2009, of 2.7 square kilometers (1.0 sq mi). Of this area, 0.13 km^{2} (0.050 sq mi) or 4.8% is used for agricultural purposes, while 0.23 km^{2} (0.089 sq mi) or 8.5% is forested. Of the rest of the land, 2.25 km^{2} (0.87 sq mi) or 83.3% is settled (buildings or roads), 0.04 km^{2} (9.9 acres) or 1.5% is either rivers or lakes.

Of the built up area, industrial buildings made up 18.5% of the total area while housing and buildings made up 31.9% and transportation infrastructure made up 20.7%. Power and water infrastructure as well as other special developed areas made up 4.1% of the area while parks, green belts and sports fields made up 8.1%. Out of the forested land, 6.3% of the total land area is heavily forested and 2.2% is covered with orchards or small clusters of trees. Of the agricultural land, 3.3% is used for growing crops and 1.5% is pastures. All the water in the municipality is flowing water.

The municipality is located south of the Rhone and Arve rivers.

== Demographics ==
Largest groups of foreign residents 2013
Nationality	Amount	% total (population)
Portugal	1,972	9.5
Italy	1,156	5.6
France	1,038	5.0
Spain	618	3.0
UK	196	0.9
Kosovo	182	0.9
Brazil	174	0.8
Germany	167	0.8
United States	128	0.6
Turkey	112	0.5
Belgium	98	0.5
Serbia	86	0.4
Morocco	71	0.3
Congo-Kinshasa	69	0.3
Netherlands	65	0.3
Russia	62	0.3
Eritrea	60	0.3
Tunisia	57	0.3
Colombia	57	0.3
Bolivia	52	0.2

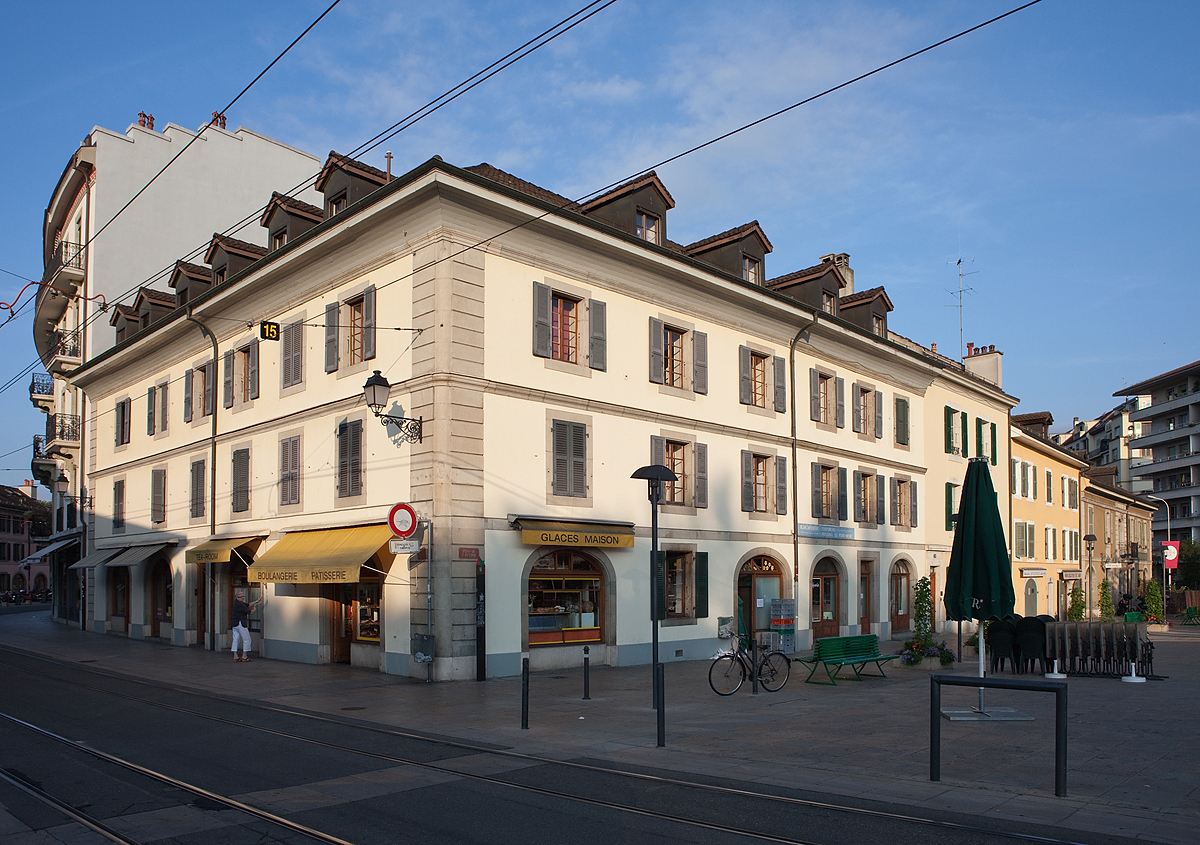
Place de l'Octroi in Carouge

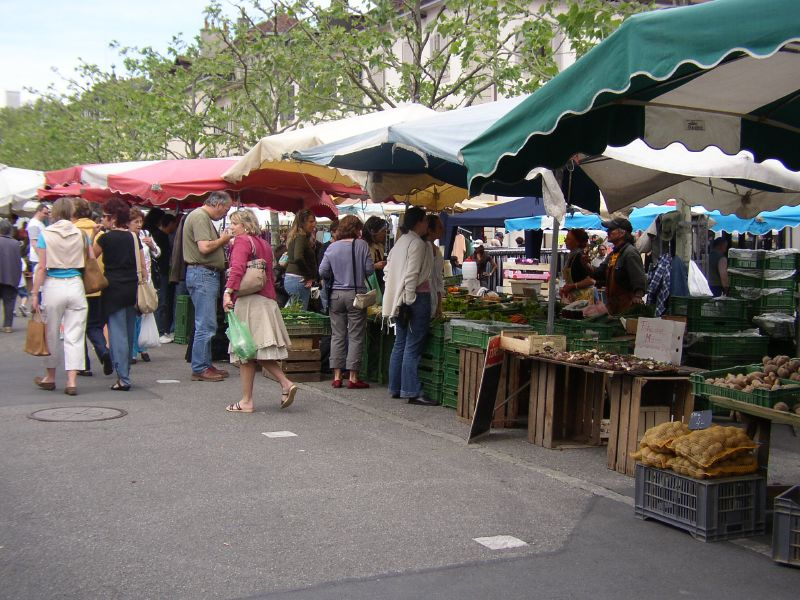
Market in Carouge

Carouge has a population (as of December 2020) of 22,536. As of 2008, 37.7% of the population are resident foreign nationals. Over the last 10 years (1999–2009) the population has changed at a rate of 21%. It has changed at a rate of 15.6% due to migration and at a rate of 5.1% due to births and deaths.

Most of the population (as of 2000) speaks French (13,700 or 77.9%), with Portuguese being second most common (921 or 5.2%) and Italian being third (846 or 4.8%). There are 567 people who speak German and 9 people who speak Romansh.

As of 2008, the gender distribution of the population was 47.9% male and 52.1% female. The population was made up of 5,775 Swiss men (28.7% of the population) and 3,868 (19.2%) non-Swiss men. There were 6,887 Swiss women (34.2%) and 3,586 (17.8%) non-Swiss women. Of the population in the municipality 3,489 or about 19.8% were born in Carouge and lived there in 2000. There were 3,845 or 21.9% who were born in the same canton, while 2,653 or 15.1% were born somewhere else in Switzerland, and 6,668 or 37.9% were born outside of Switzerland.

The total Swiss population change in 2008 (from all sources, including moves across municipal borders) was an increase of 195 and the non-Swiss population increased by 427 people. This represents a population growth rate of 3.3%.

The age distribution of the population (as of 2000) is children and teenagers (0–19 years old) make up 21.4% of the population, while adults (20–64 years old) make up 65.1% and seniors (over 64 years old) make up 13.4%. As of 2000, there were 7,867 people who were single and never married in the municipality. There were 7,452 married individuals, 881 widows or widowers and 1,390 individuals who are divorced.

As of 2000, there were 8,121 private households in the municipality, and an average of 2 persons per household. There were 3,619 households that consist of only one person and 268 households with five or more people. Out of a total of 8,366 households that answered this question, 43.3% were households made up of just one person and there were 38 adults who lived with their parents. Of the rest of the households, there are 1,731 married couples without children, 1,958 married couples with children. There were 625 single parents with a child or children. There were 150 households that were made up of unrelated people and 245 households that were made up of some sort of institution or another collective housing.

In 2000, there were 145 single family homes (or 14.6% of the total) out of a total of 995 inhabited buildings. There were 349 multi-family buildings (35.1%), along with 384 multi-purpose buildings that were mostly used for housing (38.6%) and 117 other use buildings (commercial or industrial) that also had some housing (11.8%). Of the single family homes 57 were built before 1919, while 11 were built between 1990 and 2000.

In 2000, there were 8,925 apartments in the municipality. The most common apartment size was 3 rooms of which there were 2,810. There were 1,587 single room apartments and 815 apartments with five or more rooms. Of these apartments, a total of 7,927 apartments (88.8% of the total) were permanently occupied, while 873 apartments (9.8%) were seasonally occupied and 125 apartments (1.4%) were empty. As of 2009, the construction rate of new housing units was 4.7 new units per 1,000 residents. The vacancy rate for the municipality, in 2010, was 0.13%.

The historical population is given in the following chart:

== Heritage sites of national significance ==
The Archives of Carouge is listed as a Swiss heritage site of national significance. The entire village of Carouge is listed in the Inventory of Swiss Heritage Sites.

== Politics ==
In the 2007 federal election the most popular party was the SP which received 20.5% of the vote. The next three most popular parties were the Green Party (18.77%), the SVP (18.09%) and the FDP (10.49%). In the federal election, a total of 4,482 votes were cast, and the voter turnout was 46.6%.

For the 2009 Conseil d'Etat election, there were a total of 9,805 registered voters of which 4,612 (47.0%) voted.

== Economy ==
As of 2010, Carouge had an unemployment rate of 9.3%. As of 2008, there were people employed in the primary economic sector and about businesses involved in this sector. 3,414 people were employed in the secondary sector and there were 320 businesses in this sector. 18,003 people were employed in the tertiary sector, with 1,492 businesses in this sector. There were 9,073 residents of the municipality who were employed in some capacity, of which females made up 46.5% of the workforce.

In 2008, the total number of full-time equivalent jobs was 18,636. The number of jobs in the primary sector was, all of which were in agriculture. The number of jobs in the secondary sector was 3,272 of which 1,612 or (49.3%) were in manufacturing and 1,599 (48.9%) were in construction. The number of jobs in the tertiary sector was 15,364. In the tertiary sector; 2,536 or 16.5% were in wholesale or retail sales or the repair of motor vehicles, 594 or 3.9% were in the movement and storage of goods, 590 or 3.8% were in a hotel or restaurant, 903 or 5.9% were in the information industry, 3,319 or 21.6% were the insurance or financial industry, 2,859 or 18.6% were technical professionals or scientists, 723 or 4.7% were in education and 1,219 or 7.9% were in health care.

In 2000, there were 18,589 workers who commuted into the municipality and 6,612 workers who commuted away. The municipality is a net importer of workers, with about 2.8 workers entering the municipality for every one leaving. About 16.7% of the workforce coming into Carouge are coming from outside Switzerland, while 0.1% of the locals commute out of Switzerland for work. Of the working population, 32.2% used public transportation to get to work, and 36.2% used a private car.

== Religion ==
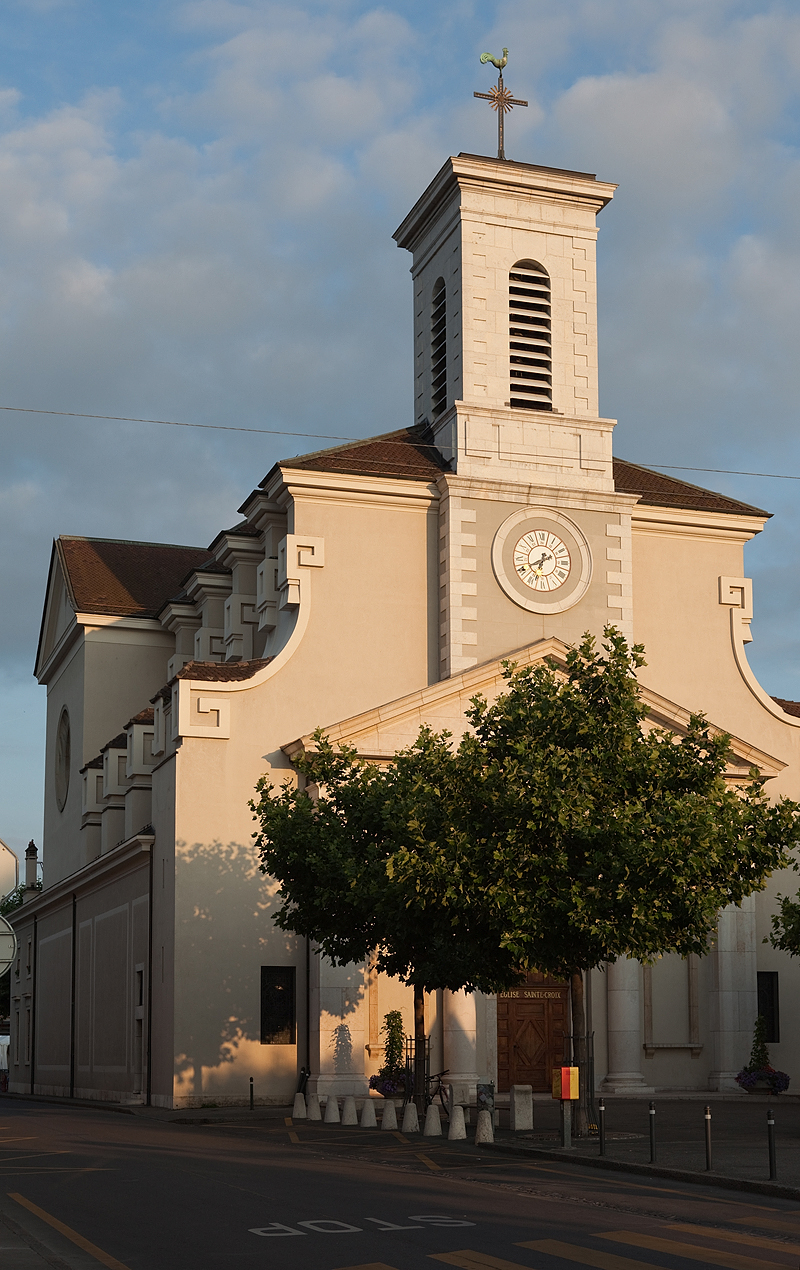
Holy Cross Church in Carouge

From the 2000 census, 7,816 or 44.4% were Roman Catholic, while 2,381 or 13.5% belonged to the Swiss Reformed Church. Of the rest of the population, there were 221 members of an Orthodox church (or about 1.26% of the population), there were 57 individuals (or about 0.32% of the population) who belonged to the Christian Catholic Church, and there were 244 individuals (or about 1.39% of the population) who belonged to another Christian church. There were 75 individuals (or about 0.43% of the population) who were Jewish, and 643 (or about 3.66% of the population) who were Islamic. There were 52 individuals who were Buddhist, 16 individuals who were Hindu and 37 individuals who belonged to another church. 4,306 (or about 24.48% of the population) belonged to no church, are agnostic or atheist, and 1,742 individuals (or about 9.90% of the population) did not answer the question.

== Sports and sights ==
Étoile Carouge is the football club and they currently play in the Swiss Challenge League. There is an outdoor Olympic swimming pool known as Piscine de la Fontenette and the indoor Piscine des Pervenches. Carouge has a museum, the Musée de Carouge, the cinema, Bio 72, which exclusively plays indie films; and a popular theatre, the Théâtre de Carouge-Atelier de Genève. Arve river, which borders Carouge from the north-east, has a walking and cycling path running along it. Carouge also has a free bicycle rental station (Genève roule), at Place de l'Octroi.

== Education ==
In Carouge about 5,230 or (29.7%) of the population have completed non-mandatory upper secondary education, and 3,244 or (18.4%) have completed additional higher education (either university or a Fachhochschule). Of the 3,244 who completed tertiary schooling, 37.3% were Swiss men, 33.7% were Swiss women, 16.3% were non-Swiss men and 12.8% were non-Swiss women.

During the 2009–10 school year there were a total of 3,816 students in the Carouge school system. The education system in the Canton of Geneva allows young children to attend two years of non-obligatory Kindergarten. During that school year, there were 377 children who were in a pre-kindergarten class. The canton's school system provides two years of non-mandatory kindergarten and requires students to attend six years of primary school, with some of the children attending smaller, specialized classes. In Carouge there were 619 students in kindergarten or primary school and 83 students were in the special, smaller classes. The secondary school program consists of three lower, obligatory years of schooling, followed by three to five years of optional, advanced schools. There were 619 lower secondary students who attended school in Carouge. There were 866 upper secondary students from the municipality along with 217 students who were in a professional, non-university track program. An additional 135 students attended a private school.

As of 2000, there were 1,577 students in Carouge who came from another municipality, while 1,012 residents attended schools outside the municipality.

== Notable residents ==
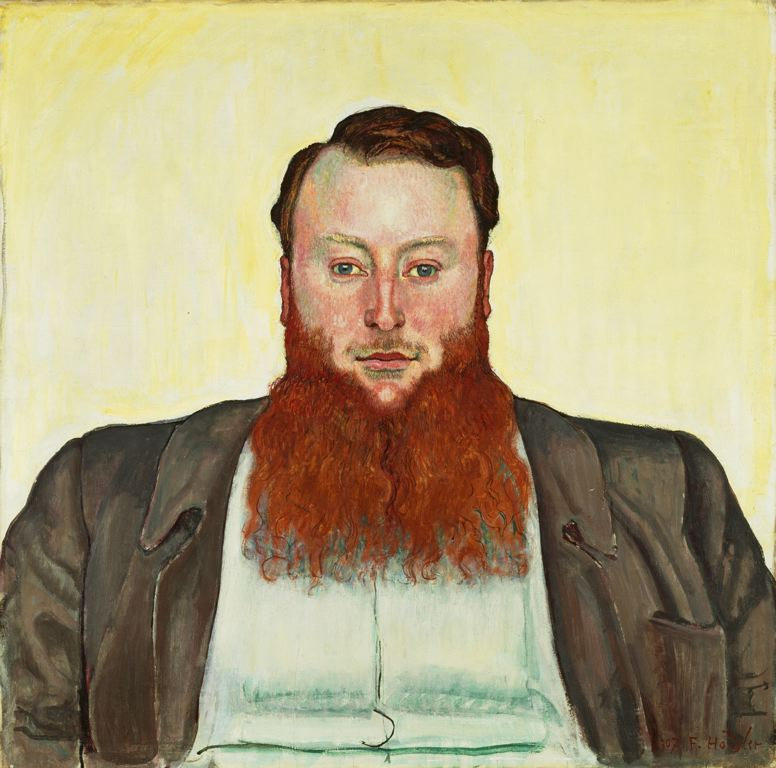
James Vibert, 1907

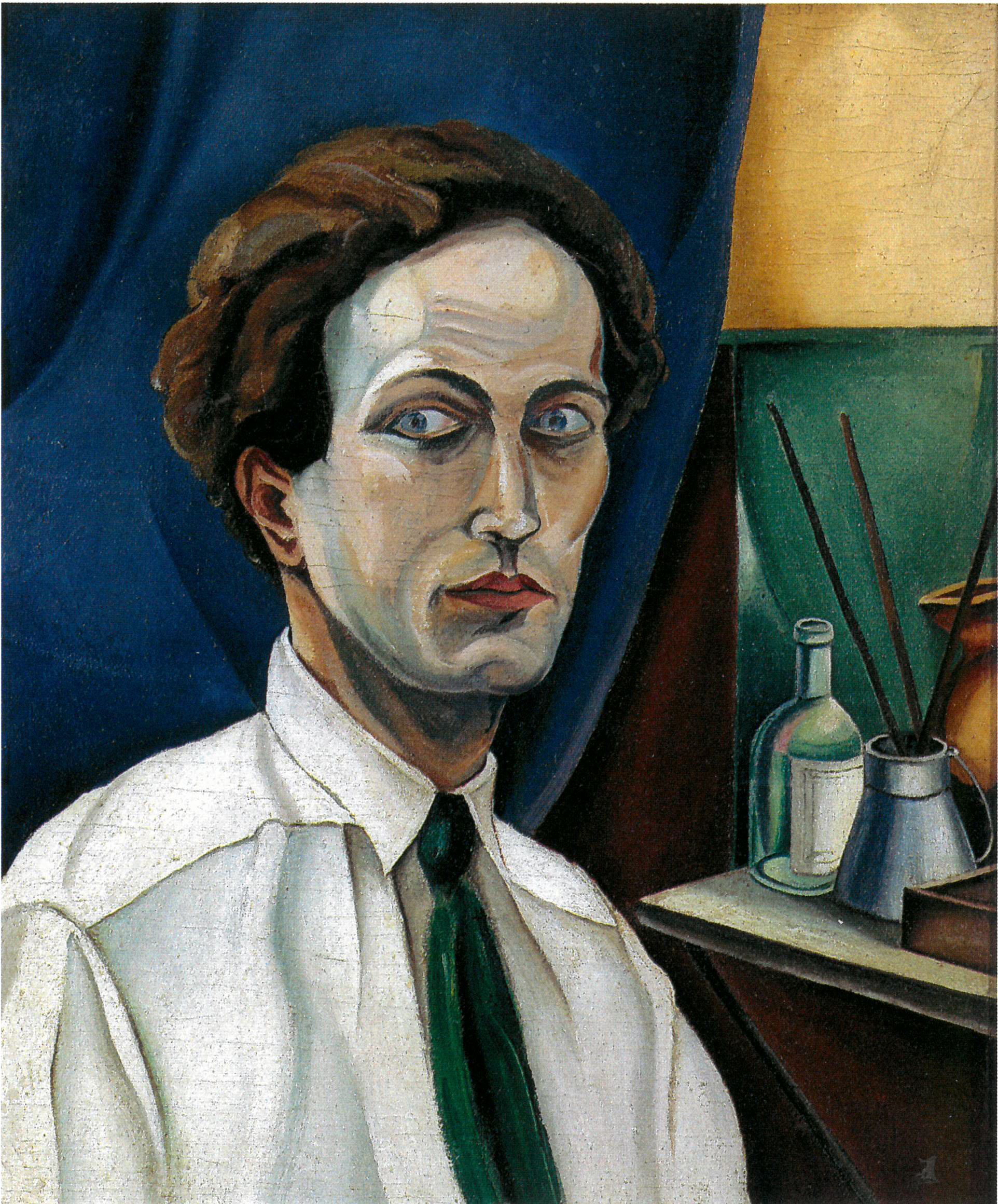
René Paresce, self portrait, 1917

- Gaspard Mermillod (1824–1892) Cardinal of the Roman Catholic Church, Bishop of Lausanne and Geneva 1883/1891.
- Alexandre Gavard (1845–1898) politician and President of the Swiss Council of States 1887/1888
- Emil Gerbeaud (1854-1919) Hungarian confectioner, chocolate producer, industrialist and entrepreneur, owner of Café Gerbeaud in Budapest
- James Vibert (1872–1942) sculptor, precursor of the Symbolism movement in Switzerland.
- René Paresce (1886–1937) Swiss-born Italian painter and writer
- Marcel Bolomet (1905–2003) Swiss-French photographer, first official photographer for the United Nations
- Georges Cottier (1922–2016) a Cardinal of the Roman Catholic Church
- Gérald Poussin (born 1946) artist, illustrator, painter, sculptor, animator and comics artist
- Vincent Rüfli (born 1988) footballer, 220 club caps
- Jenny Fähndrich (born 1989) professional BMX cyclist, competed at the 2008 Summer Olympics
