= Gérald Poussin =

Swiss artist (born 1946)

Gérald Poussin (born 1946) is a Swiss artist, illustrator, painter, sculptor, animator and comics artist.

== Biography ==
Poussin was born on 13 August 1946 in Carouge, Switzerland. He was involved in the animated films Trou attention (1970), Colonel Zabu (1970), Alphon au pays des merveilles (1972), La Nuit des Ploucs (1977), and Téo Véra change de monde (1979). Two of his films were presented at the Cannes Film Festival in 1971; he then set himself up as a cartoonist in Paris, working for a number of newspapers, including Hara-Kiri, Zinc, Charlie Hebdos, L'Echo des Savannes, Le nouvel Observateur, and Libération.

After publishing albums of comic strips such as Tendences débiles (1979), Papiers Gras (1981), Aventures de Buddy et Flappo (1983), and Le clan cervelas (1986), he became a painter, sculptor, illustrator (of Fables de la Fontaine [1996]), poster artist, furniture maker, carpet designer, jewelry designer, and watch designer, most notably for Swatch. He also wrote, acted as set decorator and costume designer, and performed in Buddy and Flappo brûle les planches (1983). He produced 17 sketches for Télévision Suisse Romande in Switzerland. He was also set decorator and costume designer for Théatre Am Stram Gram, for the Grand Théatre of Geneva, and for the Théâtre de Carouge.

Since 1970, his work has been shown in galleries in Geneva, Basel, Zürich, Paris, Milan, Berlin, and Tokyo. Beginning in 1985, he was the subject of several retrospectives: Gewerbemuseum to Basel, 1985; Museum of the Art schools in Rouen, 1986; Swiss Arts Centre in Paris, 1986; Musée du Manor Martigny, 1986; MJC de Saint-Gervais in Geneva, 1986; Museum des Arts Décoratifs in Lausanne, 1988; The Swiss Institute of New York, 1991; and Musée de Carouge, 1992.
