= Alter és Kiss =

Alter & Kiss
- Industry: Fashion
- Headquarters: Budapest / Vienna, Hungary / Austria
- Number of locations: 7 locations including Berlin, London, Shanghai, Hong Kong, Tokyo, LA and New York City
- Key people: Gabor Fabricius, Founder and Creative Director; Mei Mei Ding, Founder and Creative Director
- Products: Clothing; Accessories
- Website: www.alterkiss.com

The structure where the Alter és Kiss shop stood still stands today; it is notably the oldest house on Váci utca

Alter és Kiss was a leading fashion house in Central Europe which began in 1829 in Budapest, Hungary, producing tailor-made clothing for high society, including the Habsburg royal family.

As reported by the Magyar Bazár in 1866:

“The whole country is familiar with their reputation. There is no doubt every woman... is familiar with the shop’s best characteristics... Generations before, women used to buy their endowment garments at the Alter és Kiss shop, and now, so do their grandchildren.”

According to Magyar Bazár, the first shop for Alter és Kiss was founded by Antal Alter in 1829. The shop was located on 10 (13 today), Váci utca, one of Budapest's most famous shopping streets.

The brand was revived in 2009 by Central Saint Martins graduates Gabor Fabricius and Mei Mei Ding, with the support of the Alter family.

== History ==
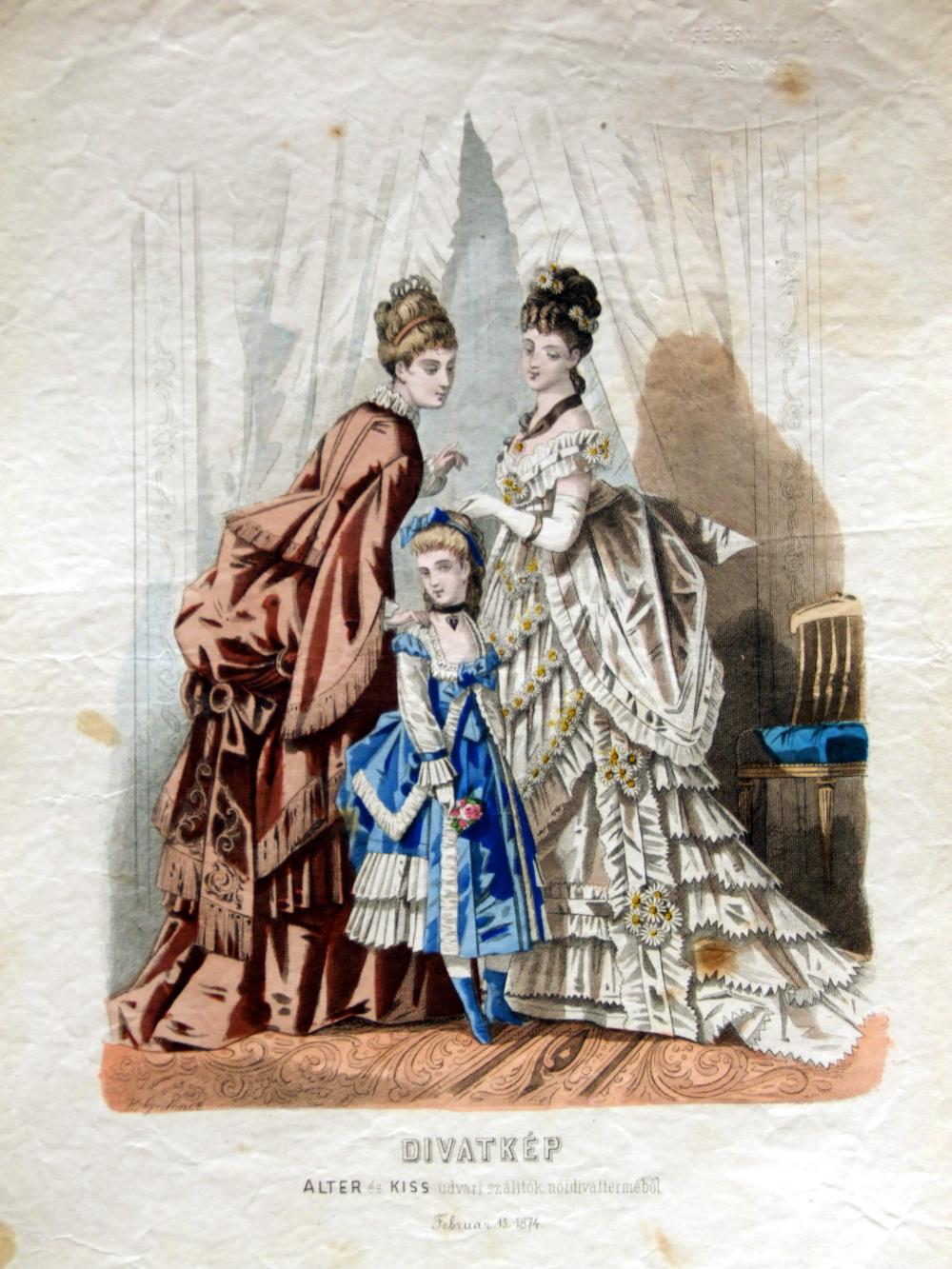
February 1874; Alter és Kiss Fashions

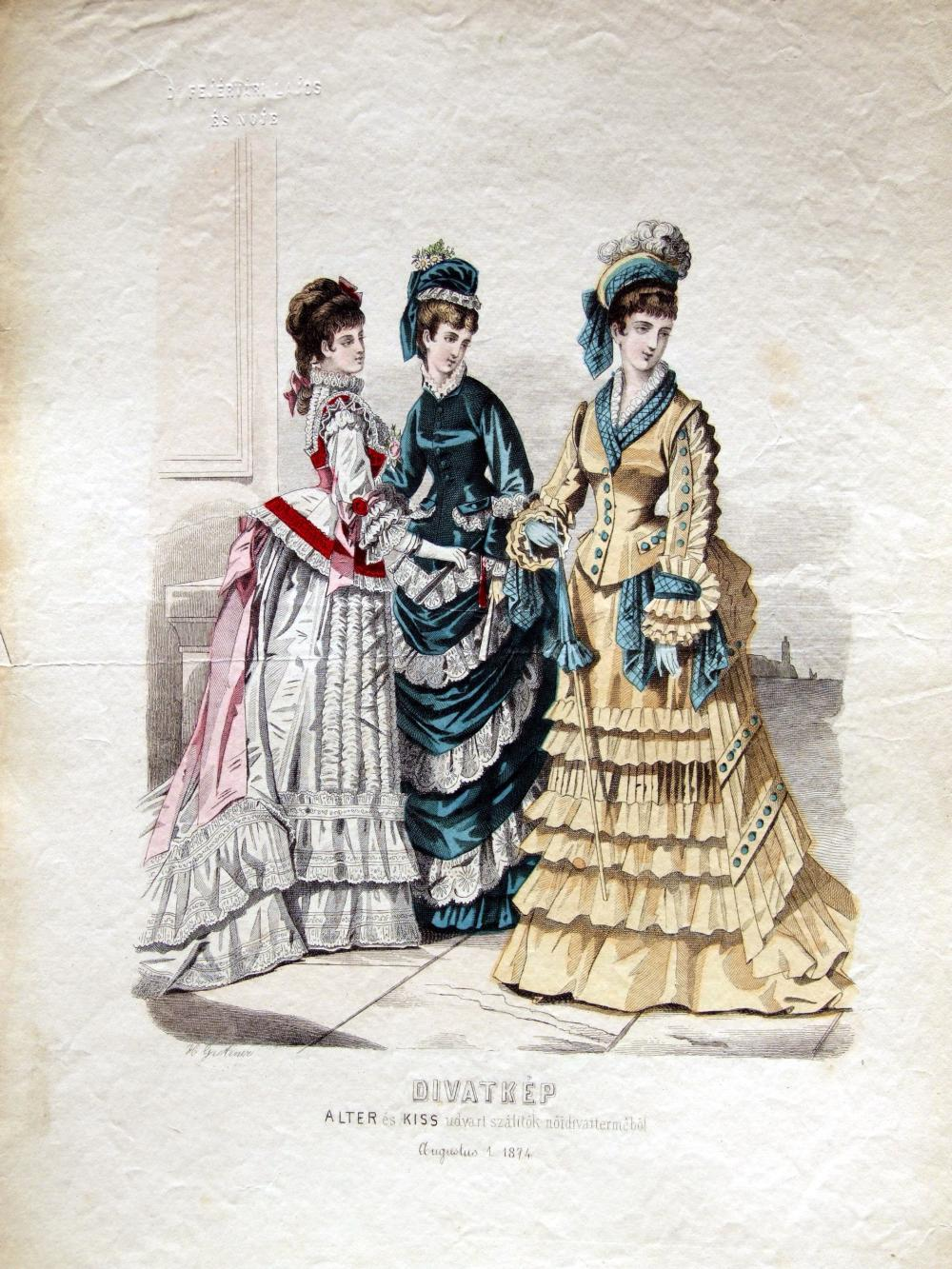
August 1874; Alter és Kiss Fashions

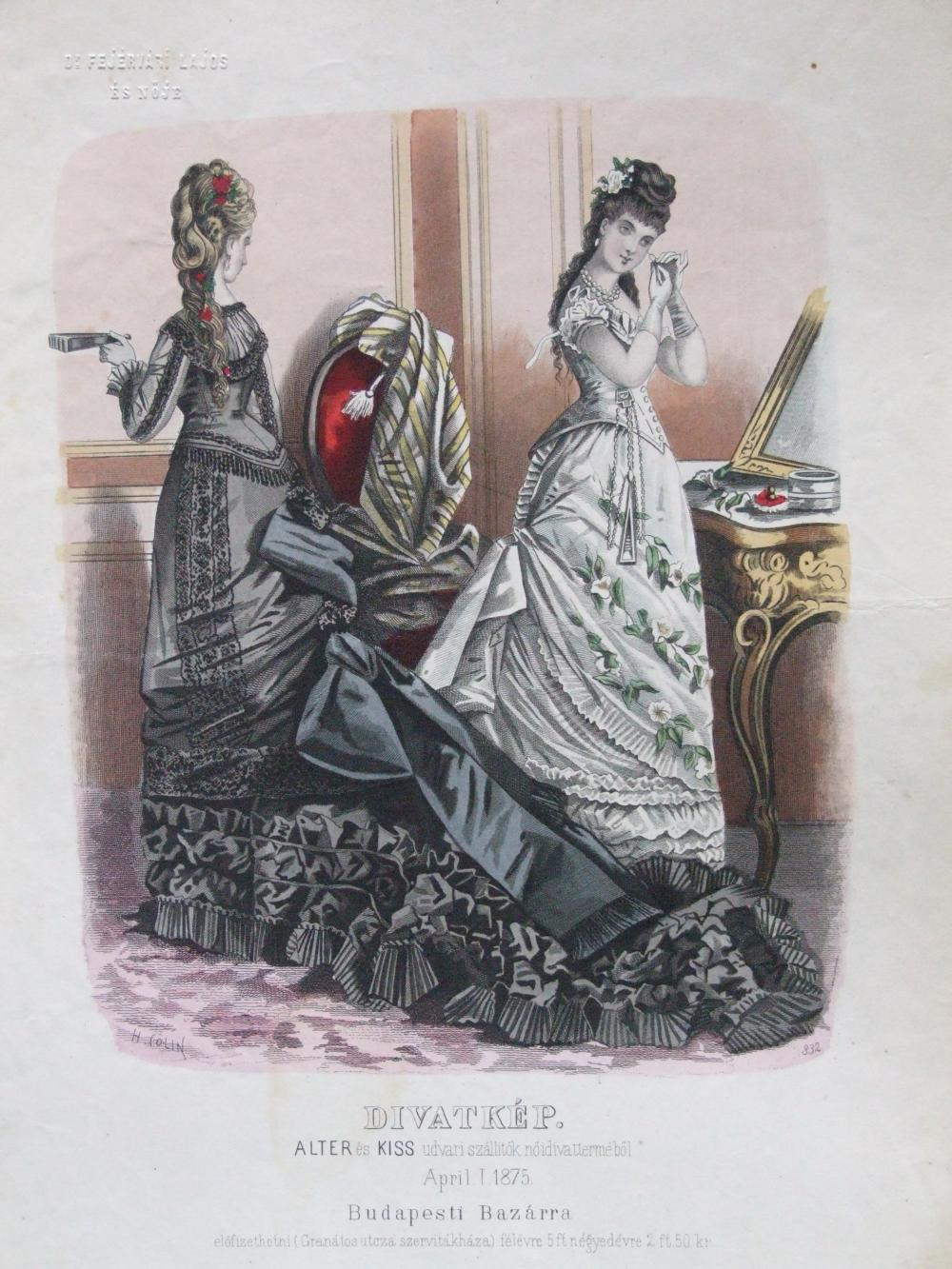
April 1875; Alter és Kiss Fashions

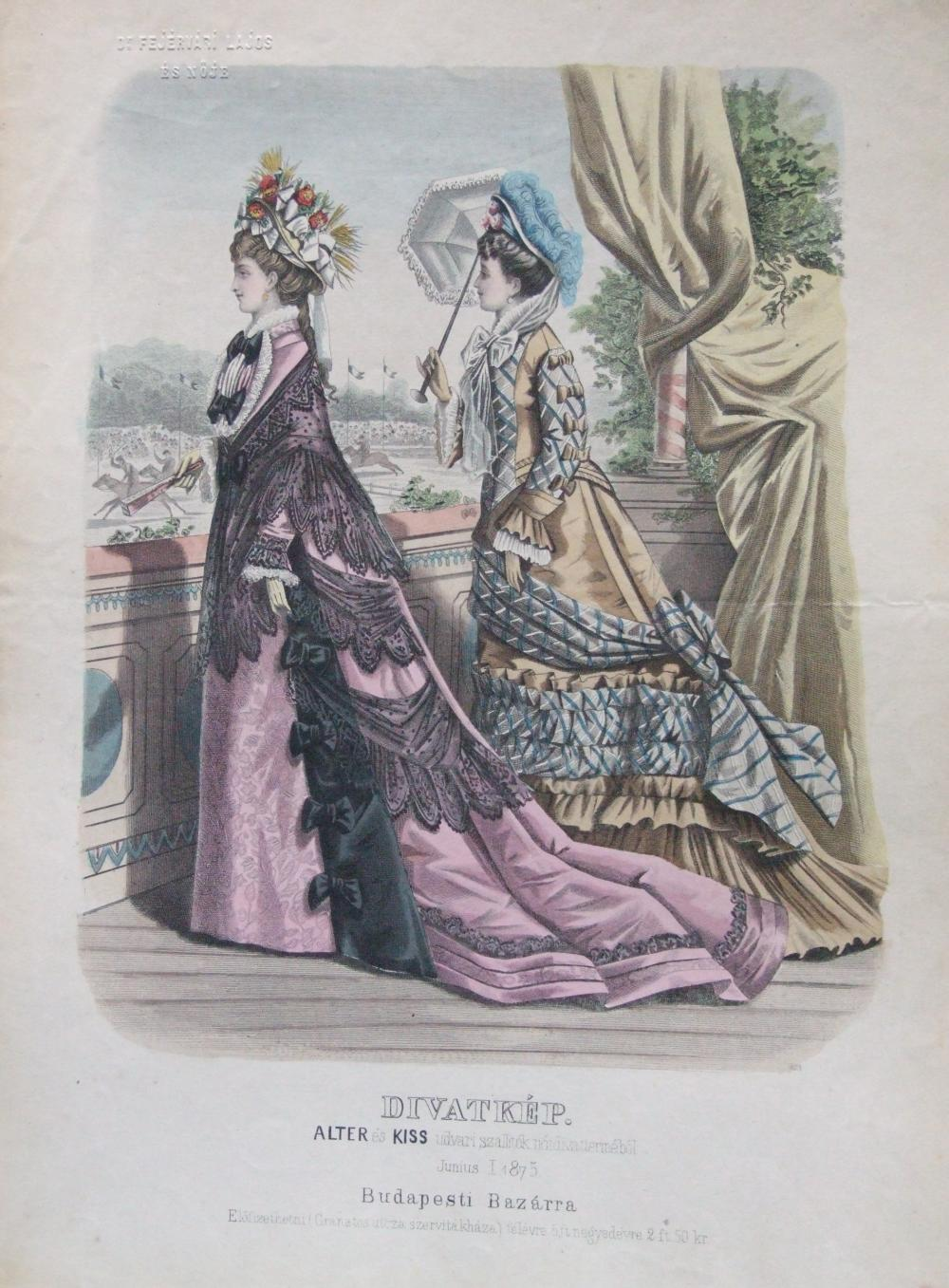
June 1875; Alter és Kiss Fashions

=== The first shop ===
The building where the Alter és Kiss shop stood still stands today; it is notably the oldest house on Váci utca. The house was built by famous watchmaker Schöndorfer Ferenc, with construction beginning in 1804 and lasting two years, and became known as the Schöndorfer house. This classicist structure had since gone through several changes. Among them, the most substantial change was the reduction of windows of its façade facing Régiposta utca, where, the original 11 rows of windows were significantly reduced to only 2. The ground floor of the house, which served as retail space, also underwent numerous changes throughout the 19th and 20th century.

=== Antal Alter ===
Antal Alter arrived in Budapest from Vienna in 1829. Although Budapest, as a city, lagged behind in development, Alter soon realized that there was a strong potential for fashion. Alter began his business by selling silk, velvet, and other fabrics, and gradually expanded into accessories such as cloaks and capes.

Alter's shop, which stood on the corner of Váci utca, had large windows for display. The shop soon became very popular with fashionable shoppers, as Richard Rado, the writer in the 19th century said:

“Everyone, from the most wealthy, to the upper middle class... almost every woman visited the shop. The shop's name even extended beyond the country’s borders... Elisabeth of Bavaria (Sissi), wife of Francis Joseph I and Queen of the Austro-Hungarian monarchy, was also among its clients. The Prussian King, as well as the Prussian Prince, both patronized shop, and the latter made frequent purchases... The shop's wide selection of fashion offered that everything one could only wish for from New York to Kamchatka.”

Even the shop's window display was highly lauded. As described by Hölgyfutár in 1857:

“For those who have visited Váci utca in the past few days, surely pedestrian was stopped by the magnificently-lit, wonderfully-colorful, and beautiful textiles in the shop windows. Here, we praise our first fashion entrepreneur, Antal Alter, who exhibits evening gowns with such glamour and beauty. Alter even used one part of the shop interior as an improvisational display, where garments were drenched in blinding light of the glimmering chandelier. His exhibits was always full of surprises, and they made the ladies visiting the shop often unsure as to where to focus their attention: to the elegant garments and refined textiles, or his stylish arrangement, which – because of its impeccable harmony – was as beautiful as a piece of landscape art.”

=== Birth of Alter és Kiss ===
In 1858, Antal Alter turned over the control of the shop to his nephew, Eduard Alter, who began to run the business with his partner Kornél Kiss. In 1866, the two expanded the size of the shop significantly, by opening a second shop right across the street from the Schöndorfer house. The second shop was located on 11b, Váci utca, and occupied the ground floor of the famous Szentkirályi house. The new shop housed a separate department exclusively for embroidered capes, cloaks, and other accessories.

Not only did Alter és Kiss create and make garments for women, but they also began to produce for a male clientele. For the shop's most exclusive clients, shop assistants, upon request, modeled the garments that the client was interested in purchasing. The partners believed that "by letting the customer see the splendid garments on another individual, it would be very helpful for him/her in making a purchasing decision.”

For Alter és Kiss, the mid-19th century saw the height of their business as it became the most well-known fashion house in Budapest.

Historical records indicate that Alter és Kiss shops remained open until 1888.

== See also ==
- House of Habsburg
- Elisabeth of Bavaria
