= Váci Street =

Street in Budapest, Hungary

Coordinates: 47°29′39.20″N 19°3′8.73″E

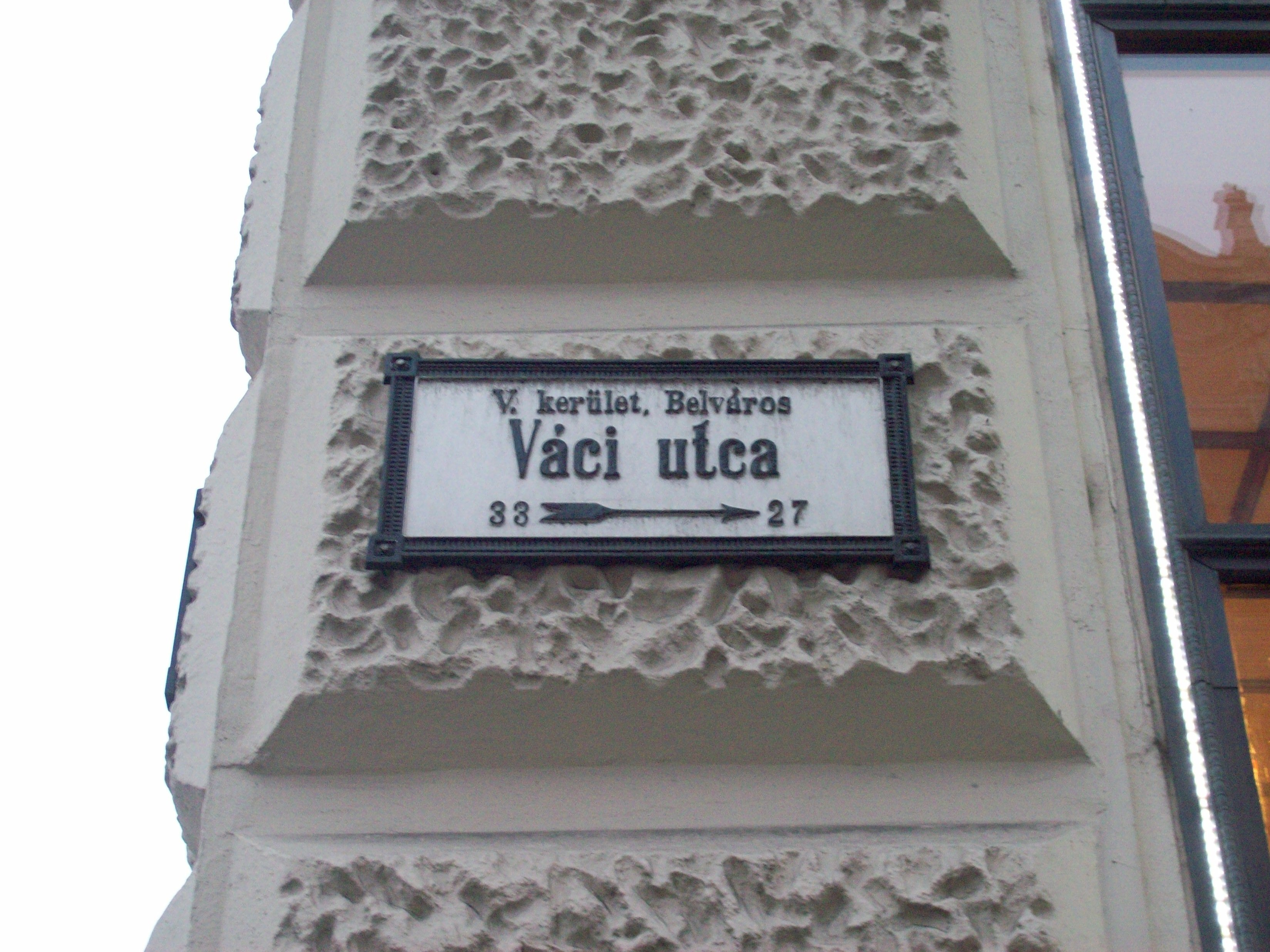
Street sign plate

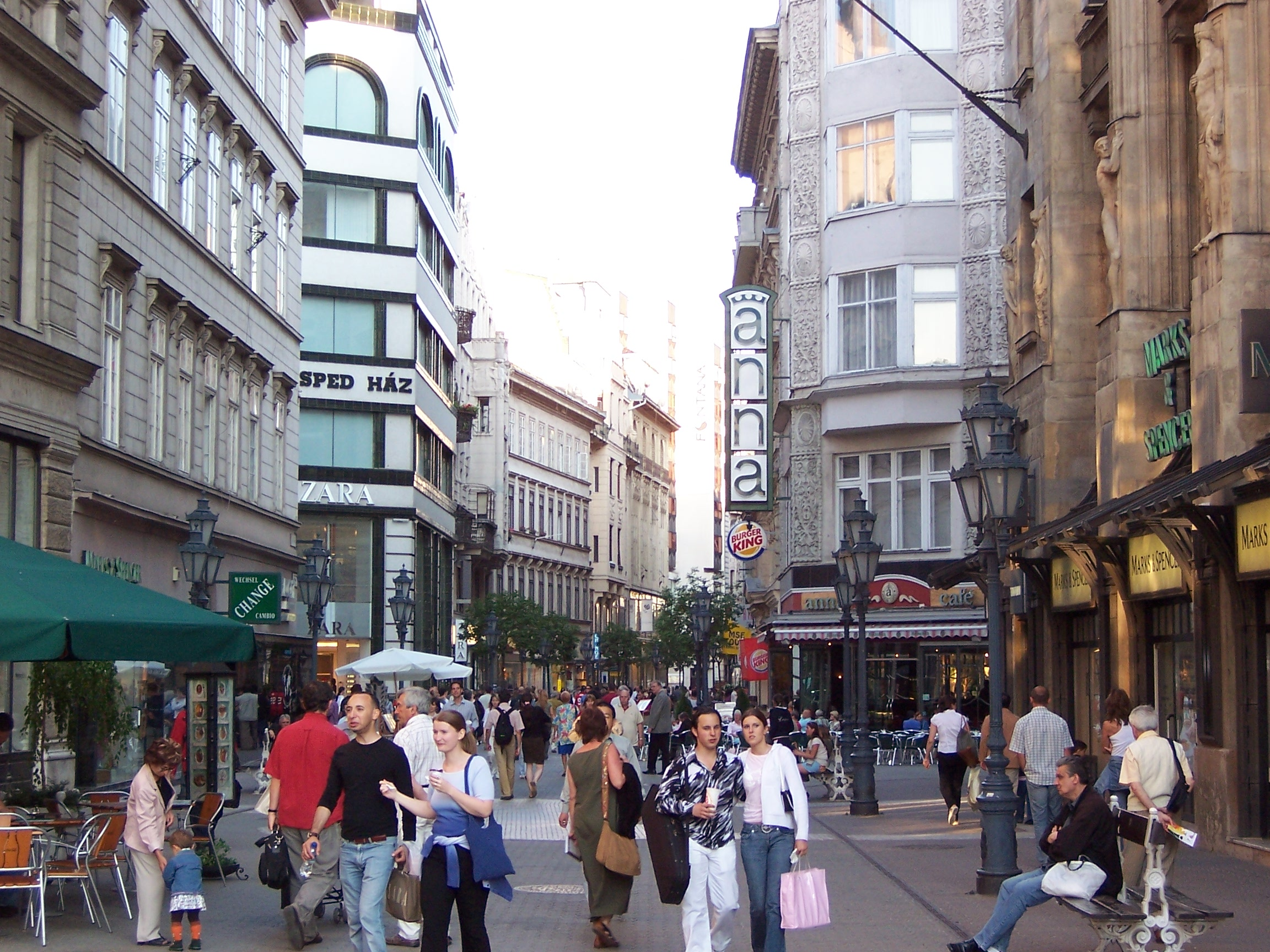
View of the street

Váci utca (Hungarian pronunciation: [ˈvaːt͡si ˈut͡sːɒ], Váci alley), named after the city of Vác, is one of the main pedestrian thoroughfares and perhaps the most famous street of central Budapest, Hungary. It features many restaurants and shops catering primarily to the tourist market. The Lonely Planet says "It's tourist central, but the line of cafés and shops are worth seeing — at least once."

Váci utca is one of the main shopping streets in Budapest. Among the retailers located here are: Zara, H&M, Mango, ESPRIT, Douglas AG, Swarovski, Hugo Boss, Lacoste and Nike. The street opens to Vörösmarty Square.

The street is known for clip joints. Some of these pretend to be strip clubs, but others present themselves as ordinary bars. Typically a female couple ask for directions to a bar and one of them will say it's her birthday. The goal is to lure the tourists into the bar, then order expensive drinks and let the tourists pay for these expensive drinks.

== See also ==
- Inner City (Budapest)
- Alter és Kiss. The first shop for Alter És Kiss was founded by Antal Alter in 1829. The shop was located on 10 (13 today) Váci utca.
