= List of mayors of Carouge =

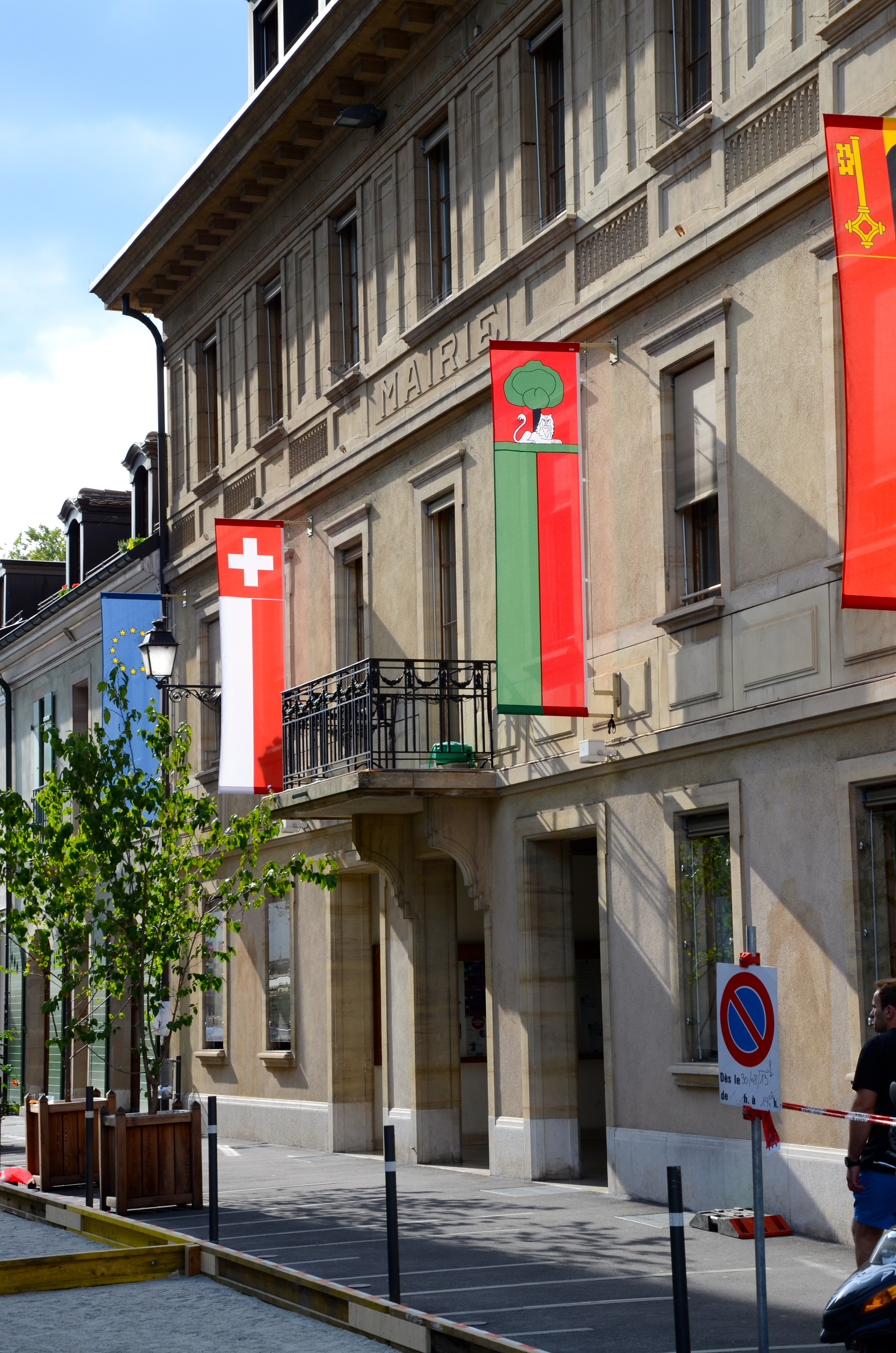
Mairie de Carouge

Coat of arms of Carouge

This is a list of mayors of Carouge, Canton of Geneva, Switzerland. The mayor (maire) chairs the three-member executive of Carouge (Conseil administratif) for one year. The term generally last from June to May the following year.

Mayor (Maire) of Carouge
Term	Mayor	Lifespan	Party	Notes
1800–1814	Louis de Montfalcon	(1759–1831)		
1816–1831	Louis de Montfalcon	(1759–1831)		
2008-2009	Jeannine de Haller Kellerhals		A gauche toute!	
2009-2010	Jean-Pierre Aebi			
2010-2011	Marc Nobs			
2011-2012	Stéphanie Lammar	(born 1979)	PSS/SPS	
2012-2013	Jeannine de Haller Kellerhals		A gauche toute!	
2013-2014	Nicolas Walder		PES/GPS	
2014-	Stéphanie Lammar	(born 1979)	PSS/SPS	
