= Vörösmarty tér =

Square in Budapest, Hungary

Coordinates: 47°29′47.74″N 19°3′2.40″E

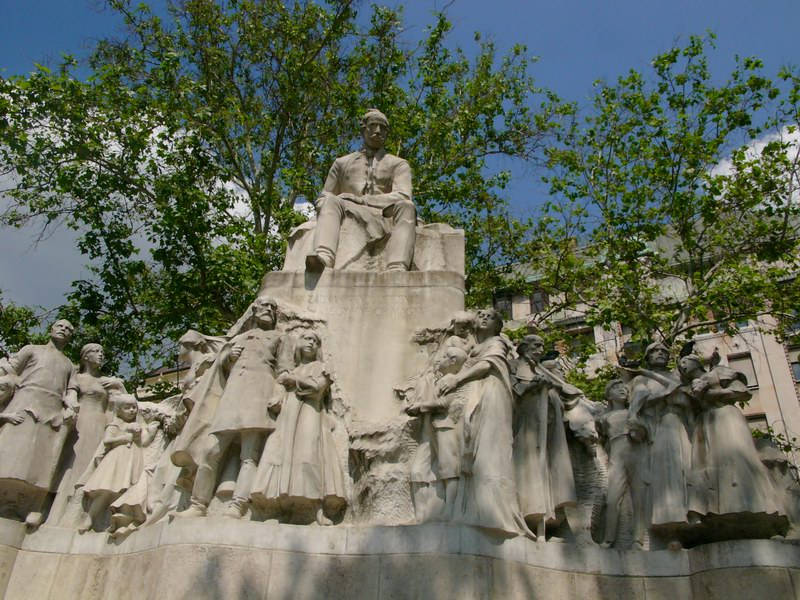
Statue of Mihály Vörösmarty on the square named after him

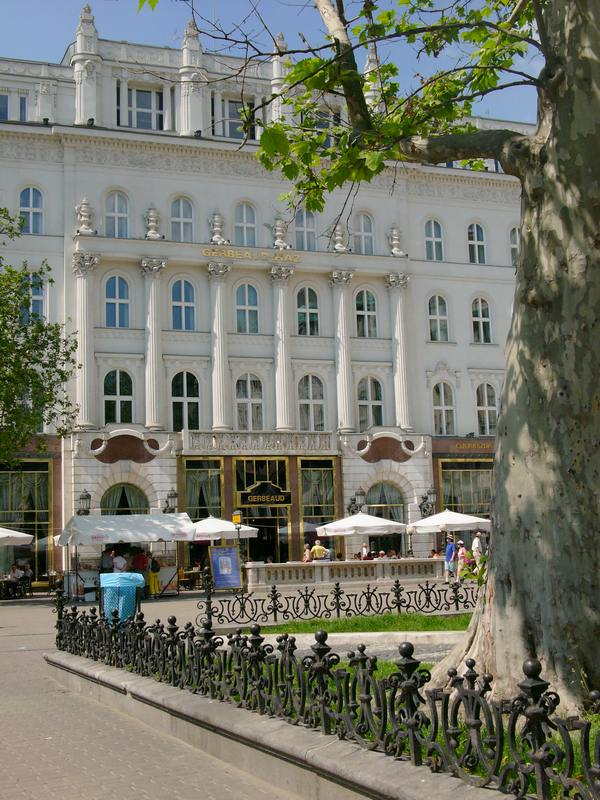
Gerbeaud Café on Vörösmarty square

Vörösmarty tér (Hungarian pronunciation: [ˈvørøʃmɒrti ˈteːr]) or Vörösmarty square is a public square in the Budapest city centre at the northern end of Váci utca.

At the centre of the square facing west is a statue by Eduard Telcs and Ede Kallós of poet Mihály Vörösmarty. Behind the monument is a fenced park and a fountain flanked by stone lions. At the north end of the square is the Café Gerbeaud and stairs to the southern terminus of the Budapest Metro's line M1. The square is also a business area, including offices for Ibusz and Aeroflot. The British Embassy is located at the square.

== Names ==
The square has held many names since it was created. In 1812, it was called Theatro piatcza (because of the theatre formerly located there). From the 1830s, it was called Harmincad tér (Thirties Square), then Játékszín tér (another reference to the theatre) in 1833, and Séta tér (Promenade Square) in the 1840s. In 1846, it was called Német Színház tér (German Theatre Square), changed to just Színház tér in 1850, and then Régi Színház tér (Old Theatre Square) in 1866. In 1874, it was named Gizella tér (in honour of Archduchess Gisela of Austria), then briefly Károlyi Mihály tér between 1918 and 1920, then Gizella tér again until 1926 when it gained its current name. Today, a column in the square lists all its former names.
