= Café Gerbeaud =

Coffeehouses in Hungary and Japan

Coordinates: 47°29′49.25″N 19°3′1.50″E

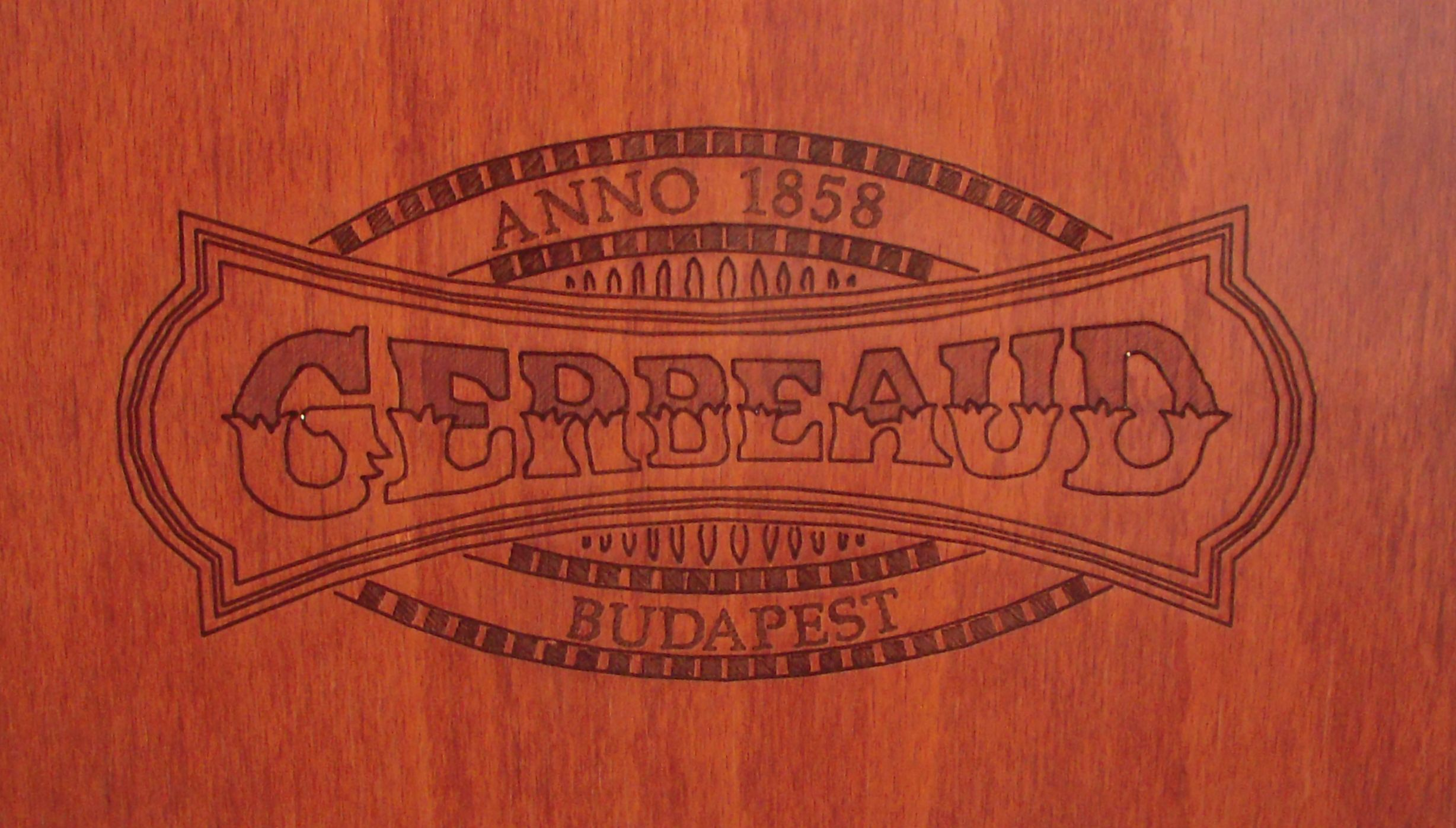
Café Gerbeaud logo

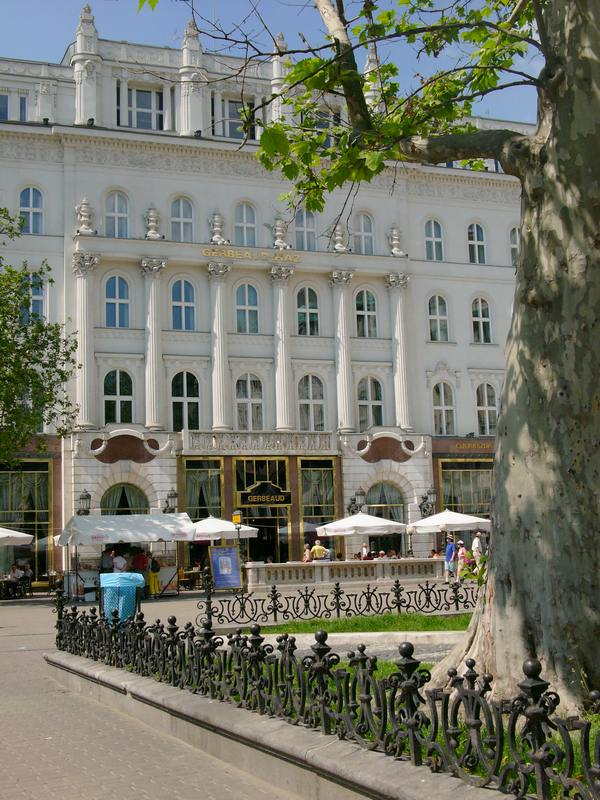
Café Gerbeaud (outside)

Café Gerbeaud, situated at Vörösmarty tér 7 in Budapest, the capital of Hungary, is a traditional coffeehouse opened in 1858. It was built in Gründerzeit style. In 2009 Café Gerbeaud opened its second confectionery in Tokyo, Japan.

== History ==
The company was started in 1858 by Henrik Kugler, the third child of a confectionery dynasty. He acquired his knowledge and experience mostly during his journeymanship in eleven European capitals including Paris. After that, he opened a confectionery at József Nádor Square which was soon considered one of the best in Pest. Among the specialties were Chinese and Russian teas as well as his ice creations which were soon named "the best ice in Pest".

In order to be closer to the city center, Kugler in 1870 moved the store to Vörösmarty tér, called "Gizella Square" at the time, on the ground floor of the head office of Hungarian Commercial Bank of Pest. The customers of that time most favoured his coffees, liqueurs and candy. But Kugler Pies and Mignons were also well known, because it was possible to take them home for the first time, wrapped on a paper tray. Known guests were, among others, Ferenc Deák and Franz Liszt and Empress Elisabeth of Austria, Queen of Hungary.

In 1882 while travelling in Paris, Kugler first met Emil Gerbeaud and immediately recognized his talent and spirit of enterprise. In 1884 Kugler finally invited him to Budapest to declare him to his associate. Later, Gerbeaud took over Kugler's store piece by piece and retained the original name.

Emil Gerbeaud, descended from a confectionery family, was born in Geneva and gained experience in Germany, France and England. He performed a number of innovations, e.g. by expanding the selection with numerous products like butter creams, Parisian crèmes, hundreds of kinds of short cakes, candy and kirsch candy. To offer this broad palette to his clientele, he hired a number of employees for sales and service. By the end of 1899, he had about 150 employees, many of whom only came to Budapest to learn and work with Gerbeaud. Due to his sense of business, by and by he equipped the bakery with modern machinery. Thus, the name Gerbeaud became a synonym for quality and bakery art. Since his clientele loved the paper boxes for takeaway pies that were already introduced by Henrik Kugler, Gerbeaud continued with this tradition and started to design these himself.

Gerbeaud was also internationally acclaimed. He was invited a jury member both to the Brussels world fair (1897) and the Paris world fair (1900), whereat in Paris he was awarded the Legion of Honour. He was further awarded numerous national and international prizes.

Eventually, Henrik Kugler died, whereupon Gerbeaud founded a public company named ‘Kuglers Nachfolger Gerbeaud AG’ (Kuglers Successor Gerbeaud PLC) to carry on the business. Since Gerbeaud set value on modern working conditions, he used automobiles alongside horse carriages from 1909 on.

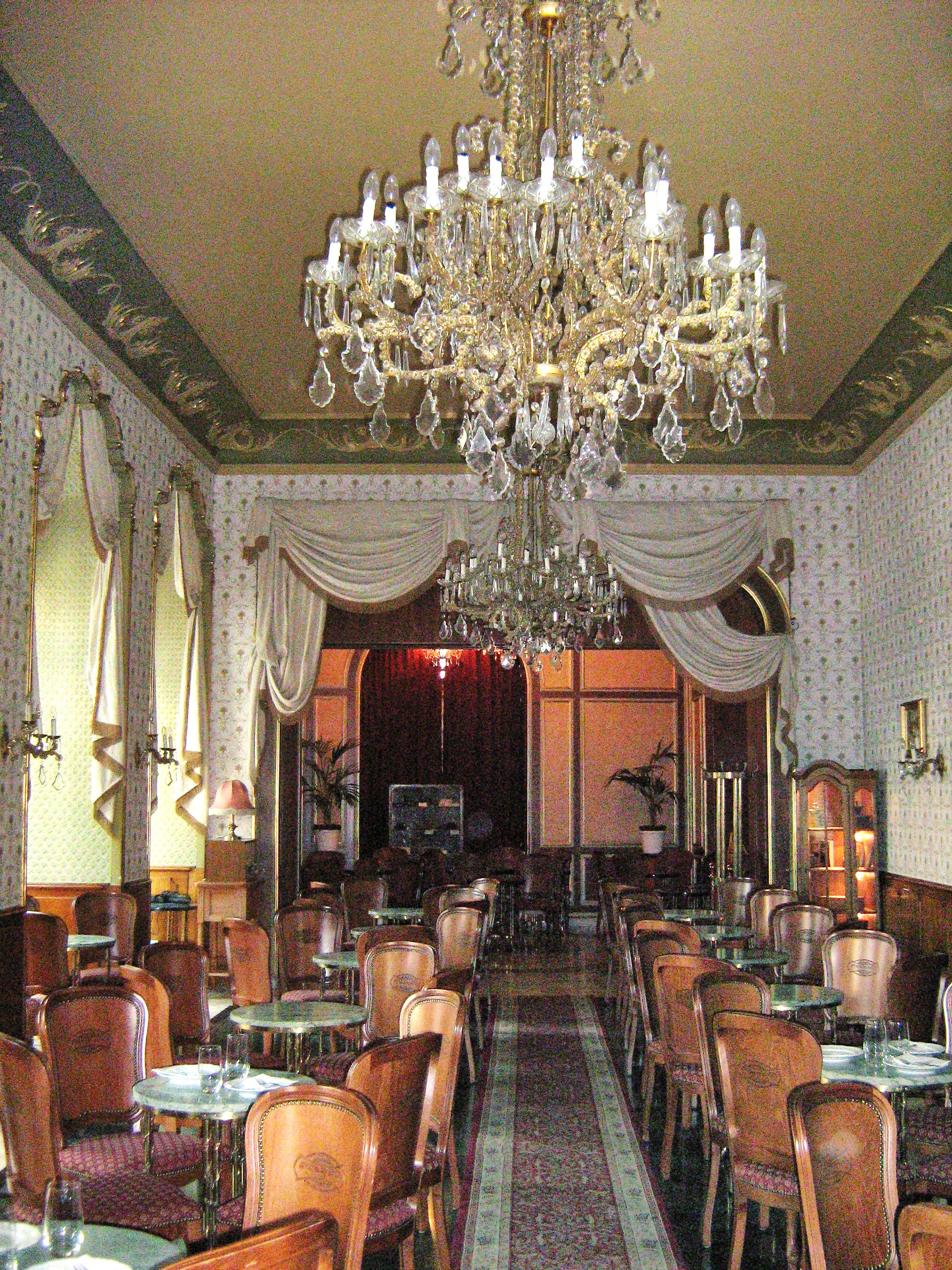

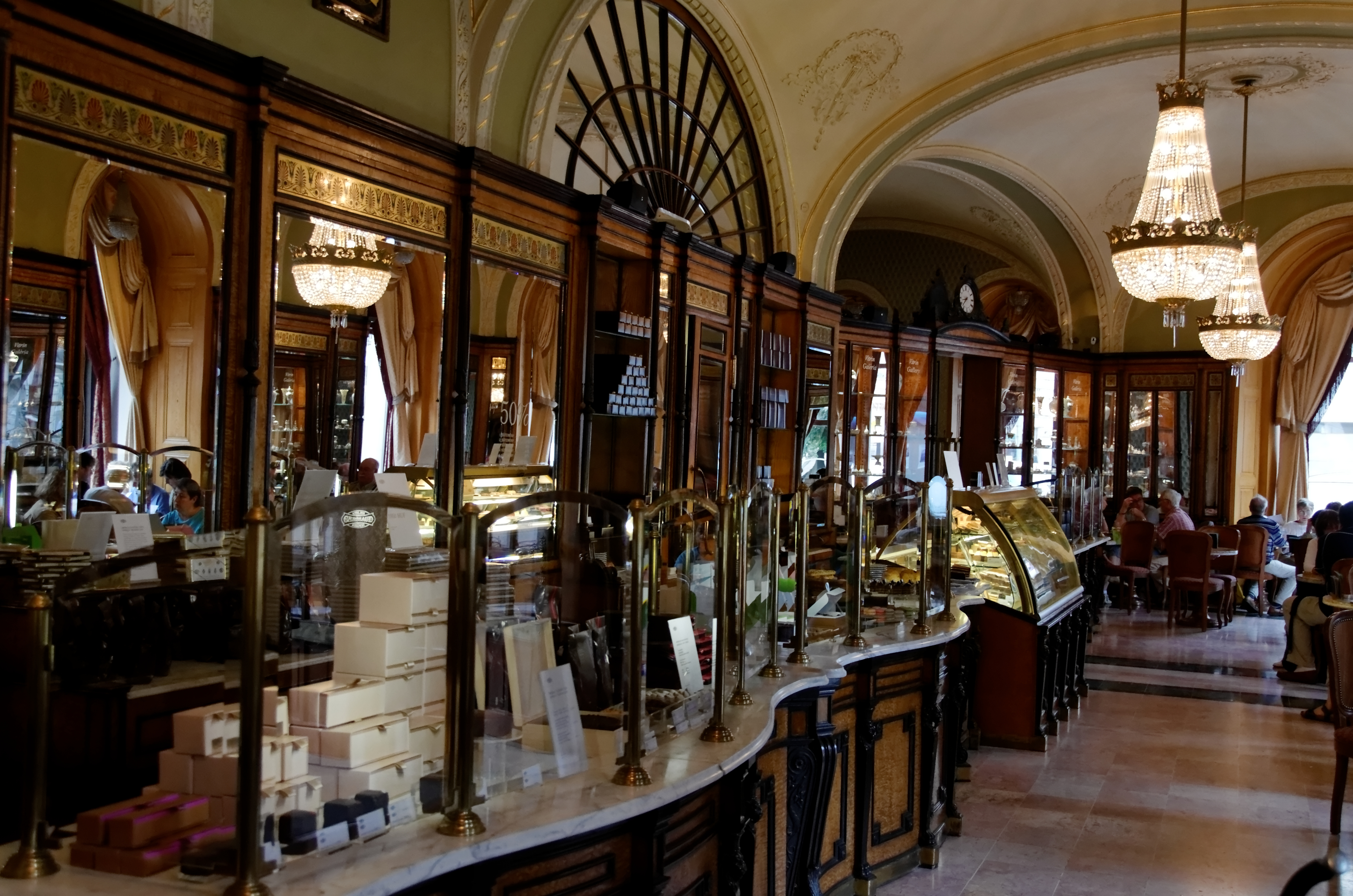
The confectionery

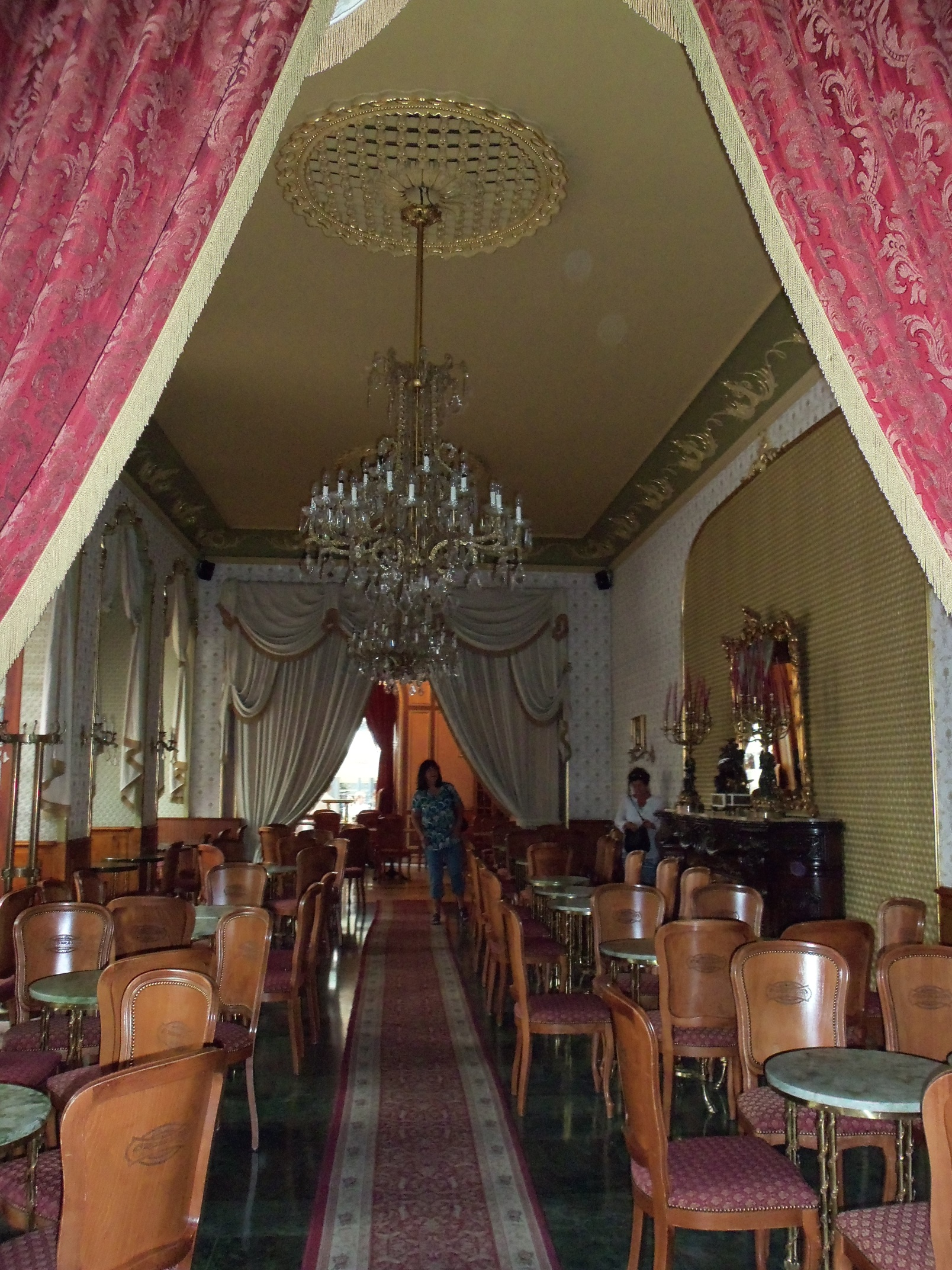
One of the saloons

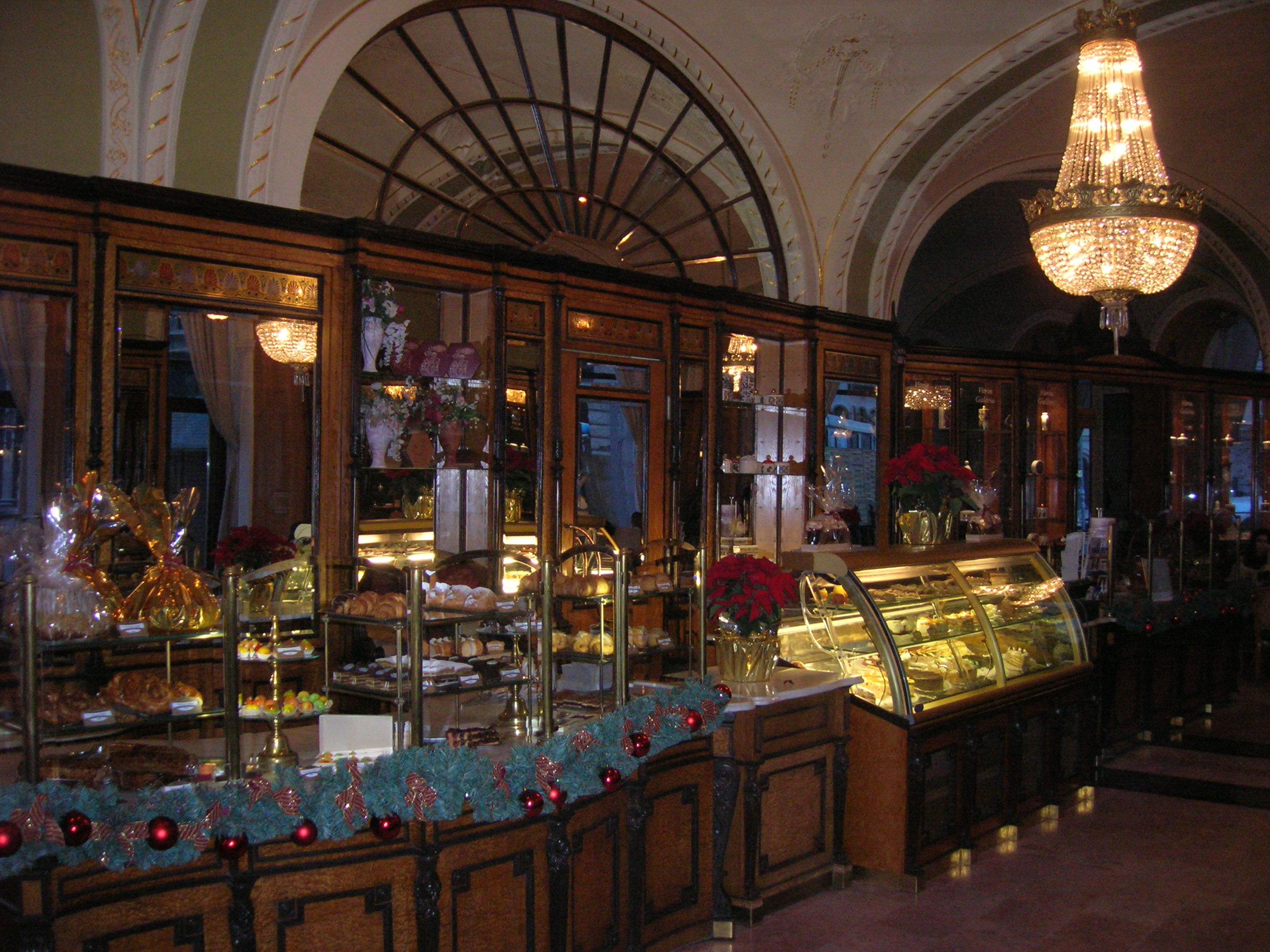
Café Gerbeaud (inside)

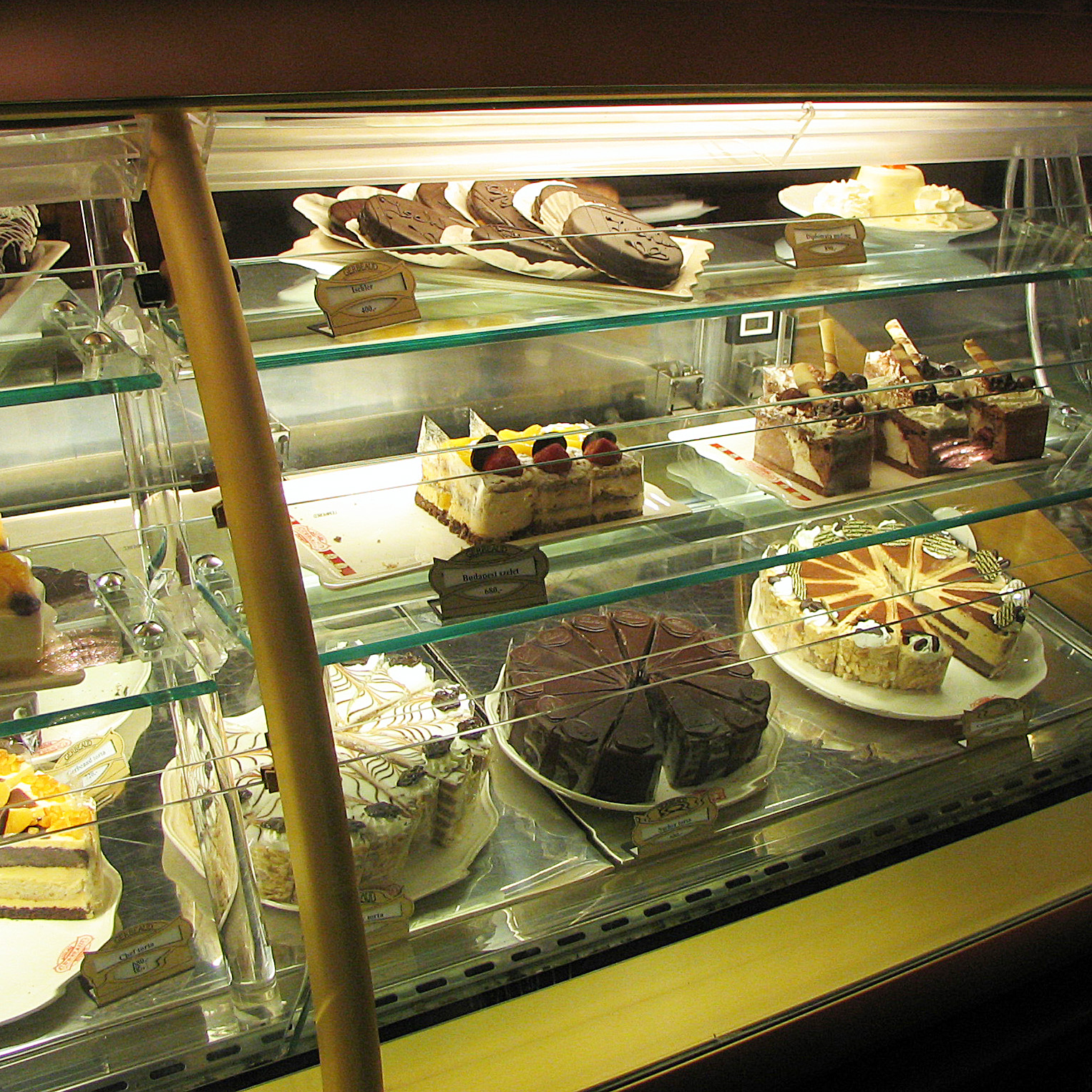
Cake menu

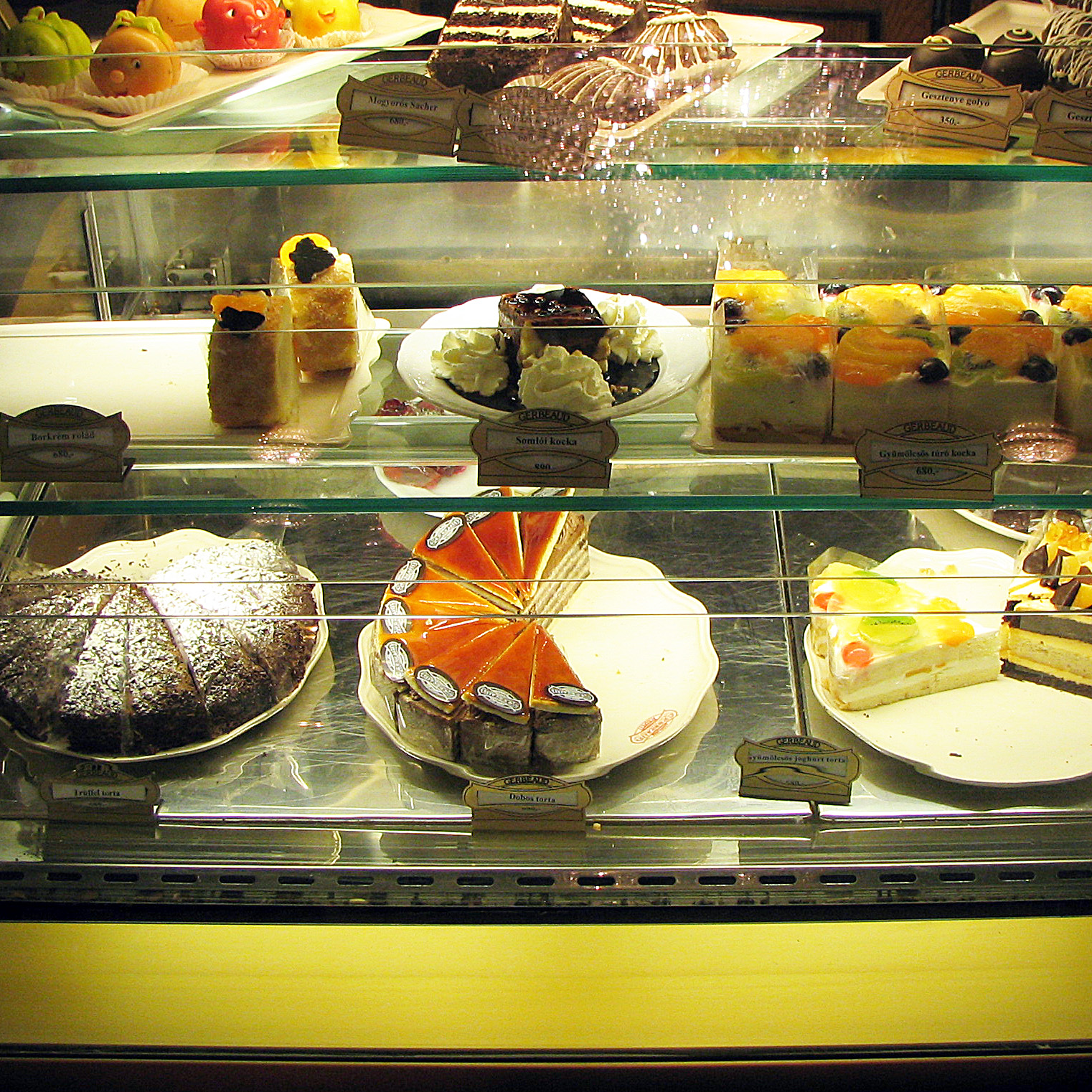
Cake menu

For the interior design of his confectionery, Gerbeaud in 1910 took advice from Henrik Darilek who mainly used marble, exotic woods and bronze. The ceiling's stucco was created in the Rococo style of Louis XV. The chandeliers were inspired by Maria Theresa of Austria. The guests were offered as French tables as well as secessionist ones which Gerbeaud had delivered from the world fair in Paris. World War I was felt, but the company survived even that.

Gerbeaud died on 8 November 1919, and bequeathed the store to his wife Ester who headed it until 1940. The shop was nationalized in 1948 and renamed "Vörösmarty", after the poet Mihály Vörösmarty, a name it held until March 1984, when it returned to its historical name. In 1995, German businessman Erwin Franz Müller bought "Gerbeaud" and had it renovated extensively. The traces of the last 50 years have thus disappeared, and today the café shines in the style built by Emil Gerbeaud.

== See also ==
- List of restaurants in Hungary
