= Marcel Bolomet =

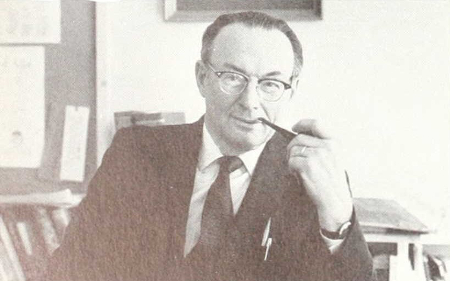
Marcel Bolomet while working at USC in 1964

Marcel Bolomet, né Bolomey (14 November 1905 in Carouge, Switzerland – 13 April 2003 in Hawaii), was a Swiss-French photographer who photographed many of the pivotal events during the 1930s and 1940s. He was the first official photographer for the United Nations, photographed the League of Nations, the first World Jewish Congress, and the last World Zionist Congress before the outbreak of World War II. He was a freelance photojournalist during the War and he photographed Benito Mussolini's death as well as the liberation of Paris. His work has been described as "having the humor, warmth and sensuality of Kertesz and is far more formal and design oriented than Doisneau." His work is “reminiscent of the work of fellow European photographers Robert Doisneau, Jacques Henri Lartigue, André Kertész, and Henri Cartier-Bresson … The significance of Bolomet's images resides not only in their historic value but in their sensitivity and humanity."

== Family, emigration, and name change ==
Bolomet's father was Edmond Bolomey, and his mother was Elisa Burgat dit Grellet. Before becoming a photographer, he attended a school for interpreters in Geneva.

He married Marion Rosenberg on April 11, 1936 in Geneva, Switzerland. Became a widower after the birth of his first son Yves Luc Bolomet. His 2nd marriage was with Françoise Chesaux-Sicilia in London the 2nd of March 1946. They had his 2nd child, Anne-Françoise, born the 20th of October 1946 in Geneva. His 3rd marriage was with Catherine Antoinette Mussard on November 24th 1961.

He returned as a widower by the time he filed his petition for naturalized United States citizenship in 1948 - his naturalization petition was also submitted under the name Marcel Bolomey, which was the name he had used as a photographer in the 1930s and 1940s. His naturalization certificate was dated November 1, 1955, and by that time he had changed his last name to Bolomet. Marcel and Marion had one son: Yves. He married his second wife, Catherine A. Mussard, in Los Angeles on November 24, 1961. They had one son, Pascal.

Bolomet first visited the United States in the early 1930s during the Depression and stayed with an uncle in Akron, Ohio who had been a Zeppelin engineer. He emigrated in the 1940s, first to New York, but later to California. It was in California that he held his first exhibition, at Joseph Magnin Company, a specialty department store in San Francisco.

== Employment in the US ==
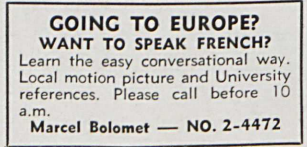
Marcel Bolomet advertisement from 1950

Bolomet intended to work for Life magazine but later decided the movie industry would be more appealing. He worked with John Engstead for a time as his printer, but trouble with union membership led him to decide to give up photography and instead become a college instructor. He was professor of French and World History at USC and Caltech for the next 25 years until his retirement. In his 70s through to his 90s, he was a popular docent and guide at the Getty Museum in Malibu.

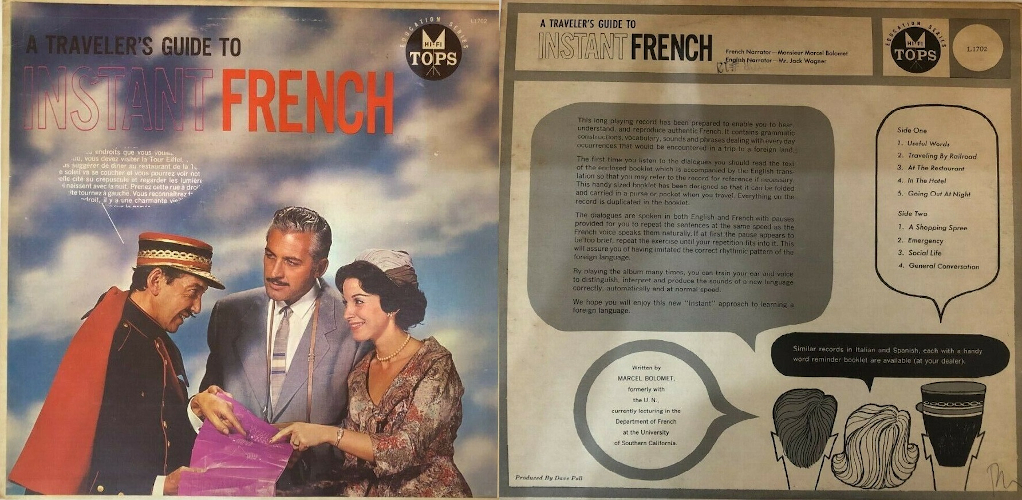
Marcel Bolomet record album from 1960

He also gave private lessons in conversational French and made at least one instructional record album for travelers to learn French, "A Traveler's Guide to Instant French" (1960).

== Photographic archive ==
Bolomet's prints were destroyed by a fire in his Geneva studio, leaving him only with the original negatives, which were made of highly flammable materials. With the technical assistance of photographer Robert Brecko Walker, Bolomet's negatives were digitized so that imperfections and damages could be fixed, and then prints were made. A second exhibition featuring Bolomet's work was held at the G. Ray Hawkins Gallery in 2003, but he died two months before its opening, at age 97.

The Marcel Bolomet Archive was acquired in 2018 by the Swiss Foundation of Photography (Fotostiftung Schweiz) for their permanent collection.
