= List of computer science journals =

Below is a list of computer science journals.

== Alphabetic list of titles ==
=== A ===
- ACM Computing Reviews
- ACM Computing Surveys
- ACM Transactions on Algorithms
- ACM Transactions on Computational Logic
- ACM Transactions on Database Systems
- ACM Transactions on Graphics
- ACM Transactions on Information Systems
- ACM Transactions on Multimedia Computing, Communications, and Applications
- ACM Transactions on Programming Languages and Systems
- ACM Transactions on Software Engineering and Methodology
- Acta Informatica
- Adaptive Behavior
- ALGOL Bulletin
- Algorithmica
- Algorithms
- Applied Artificial Intelligence
- Archives of Computational Methods in Engineering
- Artificial Intelligence
- Astronomy and Computing
- Autonomous Agents and Multi-Agent Systems

=== B ===
- Journal of the Brazilian Computer Society

=== C ===
- Cluster Computing
- Code Words
- Cognitive Systems Research
- Combinatorica
- Combinatorics, Probability and Computing
- Communications of the ACM
- Computación y Sistemas
- Computational and Mathematical Organization Theory
- Computational Intelligence
- Computational Mechanics
- Computer Aided Surgery
- The Computer Journal
- Computer Law & Security Review
- Computer Networks
- Computational Optimization and Applications
- Computer Science
- Computers & Graphics
- Computing
- Cybernetics and Human Knowing

=== D ===
- Data & Knowledge Engineering
- Data Mining and Knowledge Discovery
- Data Technologies and Applications
- Discrete Mathematics & Theoretical Computer Science
- Distributed Computing

=== E ===
- e-Informatica Software Engineering Journal
- Electronic Letters on Computer Vision and Image Analysis
- Electronic Notes in Theoretical Computer Science
- Electronic Proceedings in Theoretical Computer Science
- Empirical Software Engineering
- EURASIP Journal on Advances in Signal Processing
- Evolutionary Computation

=== F ===
- First Monday
- Formal Aspects of Computing
- Foundations and Trends in Communications and Information Theory
- Foundations and Trends in Computer Graphics and Vision
- Foundations and Trends in Theoretical Computer Science
- Fundamenta Informaticae
- Future Generation Computer Systems
- Fuzzy Sets and Systems

=== H ===
- Higher-Order and Symbolic Computation
- Hipertext.net

=== I ===
- ICGA Journal
- ICT Express
- IEEE/ACM Transactions on Networking
- IEEE Annals of the History of Computing
- IEEE Intelligent Systems
- IEEE Internet Computing
- IEEE Micro
- IEEE MultiMedia
- IEEE Software
- IEEE Transactions on Computers
- IEEE Transactions on Control Systems Technology
- IEEE Transactions on Dependable and Secure Computing
- IEEE Transactions on Evolutionary Computation
- IEEE Transactions on Fuzzy Systems
- IEEE Transactions on Information Forensics and Security
- IEEE Transactions on Information Theory
- IEEE Transactions on Learning Technologies
- IEEE Transactions on Mobile Computing
- IEEE Transactions on Multimedia
- IEEE Transactions on Neural Networks and Learning Systems
- IEEE Transactions on Pattern Analysis and Machine Intelligence
- IEEE Transactions on Software Engineering
- IEEE Transactions on Visualization and Computer Graphics
- The Imaging Science Journal
- Information and Computation
- Information and Software Technology
- Information Processing Letters
- Information Services & Use
- Information Systems
- Information Systems Journal
- Innovations in Systems and Software Engineering
- International Institute for Advanced Studies in Systems Research and Cybernetics
- International Journal of Advanced Computer Technology
- International Journal of Applied Mathematics and Computer Science
- International Journal of Computational Geometry and Applications
- International Journal of Computational Intelligence and Applications
- International Journal of Computational Methods
- International Journal of Computer Assisted Radiology and Surgery
- International Journal of Computer Processing of Languages
- International Journal of Computer Vision
- International Journal of Cooperative Information Systems
- International Journal of Creative Computing
- International Journal of Data Warehousing and Mining
- International Journal of e-Collaboration
- International Journal of Foundations of Computer Science
- International Journal of High Performance Computing Applications
- International Journal of Image and Graphics
- International Journal of Information Acquisition
- International Journal of Information Technology & Decision Making
- International Journal of Innovation and Technology Management
- International Journal of Intelligent Information Technologies
- International Journal of Mathematics and Computer Science
- International Journal of Mobile and Blended Learning
- International Journal of Modelling and Simulation
- International Journal of Pattern Recognition and Artificial Intelligence
- International Journal of Shape Modeling
- International Journal of Software and Informatics
- International Journal of Software Engineering and Knowledge Engineering
- International Journal of Uncertainty, Fuzziness and Knowledge-Based Systems
- International Journal of Wavelets, Multiresolution and Information Processing
- International Journal of Web Services Research
- International Journal of Wireless Information Networks
- International Journal on Artificial Intelligence Tools
- International Journal on Semantic Web and Information Systems
- Internet Histories

=== J ===
- Journal of Advances in Information Fusion
- Journal of Artificial Intelligence Research
- Journal of Automata, Languages and Combinatorics
- Journal of Automated Reasoning
- Journal of Bioinformatics and Computational Biology
- Journal of Cases on Information Technology
- Journal of Chemical Information and Modeling
- Journal of Cheminformatics
- Journal of Circuits, Systems, and Computers
- Journal of Communications and Networks
- Journal of Computational Geometry
- Journal of Computer and System Sciences
- Journal of Computer-Mediated Communication
- Journal of Computing Sciences in Colleges
- Journal of Cryptology
- Journal of Database Management
- Journal of Experimental and Theoretical Artificial Intelligence
- Journal of Formalized Reasoning
- Journal of Functional Programming
- Journal of Global Information Management
- Journal of Graph Algorithms and Applications
- Journal of Graphics Tools
- Journal of Grid Computing
- Journal of Information Technology & Politics
- Journal of Intelligent and Robotic Systems
- Journal of Interconnection Networks
- Journal of Logic and Computation
- Journal of Logic, Language and Information
- Journal of Logical and Algebraic Methods in Programming
- Journal of Machine Learning Research
- Journal of Multimedia
- The Journal of Object Technology
- Journal of Organizational and End User Computing
- Journal of Software: Evolution and Process
- Journal of Statistical Software
- Journal of Strategic Information Systems
- The Journal of Supercomputing
- Journal of Symbolic Computation
- Journal of Systems and Software
- Journal of the ACM
- Journal of Web Semantics

=== K ===
- Kybernetes

=== L ===
- Logical Methods in Computer Science

=== M ===
- Machine Learning
- Machine Vision and Applications
- Mathematics and Computer Education
- Minds and Machines
- Mobile Computing and Communications Review
- Molecular Informatics

=== N ===
- Natural Computing
- Neural Networks
- Neurocomputing

=== P ===
- Parallel Processing Letters
- Pattern Recognition Letters
- PeerJ Computer Science
- Performance Evaluation
- Personal and Ubiquitous Computing
- Presence: Teleoperators & Virtual Environments
- Probability in the Engineering and Informational Sciences
- Proceedings of the IEEE
- Program: Electronic Library and Information Systems

=== R ===
- ReCALL
- ReScience C
- Research on Language and Computation

=== S ===
- Science Software Quarterly
- Scientific Computing & Instrumentation
- SIAM Journal on Computing
- SIAM Journal on Scientific Computing
- Simulation & Gaming
- Software and Systems Modeling
- Software Testing, Verification & Reliability

=== T ===
- Theoretical Computer Science
- Theoretical Issues in Ergonomics Science
- Transactions on Aspect Oriented Software Development
- Transactions on Graph Data and Knowledge
- TUGboat

== See also ==
Databases

- arXiv
- DBLP (Digital Bibliography & Library Project in computer science)
- The Collection of Computer Science Bibliographies

Lists

- Lists of academic journals
- List of artificial intelligence journals
- List of computer magazines and List of computer books
- List of computer science conferences
- List of computer science conference acronyms
- List of mathematics journals
- List of open problems in computer science
- List of software programming journals

Categories

- Biomedical informatics journals
- Computational statistics journals
- Cryptography journals
- Human–computer interaction journals
- Systems journals
