= List of software programming journals =

List of academic journals focused on software programming

This is a list of software programming journals which contains notable peer-reviewed academic journals that publish research related to software programming, software engineering, programming languages, open-source software, algorithms, and related areas.

== Journals ==
- ACM Computing Surveys
- ACM Transactions on Programming Languages and Systems
- Cutter IT Journal formerly known as American Programmer
- Empirical Software Engineering
- First Monday (journal)
- Formal Aspects of Computing
- IEEE Software
- IEEE Transactions on Games
- IEEE Transactions on Software Engineering
- IET Software
- Information and Software Technology
- Journal of Functional Programming
- Journal of Object Technology
- Journal of Software: Evolution and Process
- Journal of Computer Languages
- Journal of Systems and Software
- Lisp and Symbolic Computation
- Science of Computer Programming
- Software and Systems Modeling
- Software: Practice and Experience
- Software Quality Journal
- Transactions on Software Engineering and Methodology

=== Algorithms journals ===
- ACM Transactions on Algorithms
- Algorithmica
- Algorithms (journal)
- Information Processing Letters
- Journal of Algorithms
- SIAM Journal on Computing
- Theoretical Computer Science (journal)

=== Journals on open-source software ===
- Empirical Software Engineering
- Journal of Open Research Software
- Journal of Open Source Software
- ;login:
- SoftwareX

== See also ==
- List of computer science journals
- List of artificial intelligence journals
- Lists of academic journals
- List of computer books and List of computer magazines
- List of programming languages
- Lists of programming software development tools
- List of open-source code libraries
- Lists of open-source artificial intelligence software
- List of free and open-source software packages for programming language support
- C/C++ Users Journal
- Association for Computing Machinery (ACM)
- ACM SIGPLAN Notices
- Outline of computer programming
- Programming education
