= Informatics =

Field of study of computational systems

Informatics is the study of computational systems. According to the ACM Europe Council and Informatics Europe, informatics is synonymous with computer science and computing as a profession, in which the central notion is the transformation of information. In some cases, the term "informatics" may also be used with different meanings, e.g., in the context of social computing or library science.

== Different meanings ==
United States	Germany	Russia	France	Italy	English transcription
Computer science, Computing	Informatik	Информатика (Latinized: informatika)	Informatique	Informatica	Informatics
Theoretical computer science	Theoretische Informatik	Теоретическая информатика	Informatique théorique	Informatica teorica	Theoretical informatics
Computer engineering	Technische Informatik	Инженерная информатика	Ingénierie or génie informatique	Ingegneria informatica	Technical informatics
Neurocomputing, Neural computation	Neuroinformatik	Нейроинформатика	Neuro-informatique	Neuroinformatica	Neuroinformatics
Psychoinformatics	Psychoinformatik	Психоинформатика	Psychoinformatique	Psicoinformatica	Psychoinformatics
Bioinformatics	Bioinformatik	Биоинформатика	Bioinformatique	Bioinformatica	Bioinformatics
Hydroinformatics	Hydroinformatik	Гидроинформатика	Hydroinformatique	Idroinformatica	Hydroinformatics
Ecoinformatics	Ökoinformatik	Экоинформатика	Écoinformatique	Ecoinformatica	Ecoinformatics
Social informatics	Sozioinformatik	Социальная информатика	Socioinformatique	Socioinformatica	Social informatics

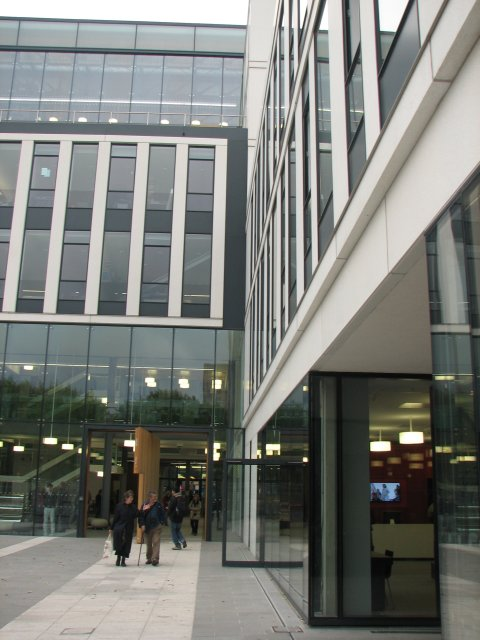
Informatics Forum, completed in 2008. It houses researchers of the University of Edinburgh's School of Informatics.

In some countries, depending on local interpretations and contexts, the term informatics is used synonymously to mean information systems, information science, information theory, information engineering, information technology, information processing, or other theoretical or practical fields. In Germany, the term informatics closely corresponds to modern computer science. Accordingly, universities in continental Europe usually translate "informatics" as computer science, or sometimes information and computer science, although technical universities may translate it as computer science & engineering. In some countries, this term is associated with natural computation and neural computation.

In the United States, however, the term informatics is mostly used in context of data science, library science, or its applications in healthcare (health informatics), where it first appeared in the US.

The University of Washington uses this term to refer to social computing.

The Government of Canada uses the term to refer to operational units offering network and computer services to the various departments.

== Etymology ==
In 1956, the German informatician Karl Steinbuch and engineer Helmut Gröttrup coined the word Informatik when they developed the Informatik-Anlage for the Quelle mail-order management, one of the earliest commercial applications of data processing. In April 1957, Steinbuch published a paper called Informatik: Automatische Informationsverarbeitung ("Informatics: Automatic Information Processing"). The morphology—informat-ion + -ics—uses "the accepted form for names of sciences, as conics, mathematics, linguistics, optics, biomechanics, or matters of practice, as economics, politics, tactics", and so, linguistically, the meaning extends easily to encompass both the science of information and the practice of information processing. The German word Informatik is usually translated to English as computer science by universities or computer science & engineering by technical universities (German equivalents for institutes of technology). Depending on the context, informatics is also translated into computing, scientific computing or information and computer technology. The French term informatique was coined in 1962 by Philippe Dreyfus. In the same month was also proposed independently by Walter F. Bauer (1924–2015) and associates who co-founded software company Informatics Inc. The term for the new discipline quickly spread throughout Europe, but it did not catch on in the United States. Over the years, many different definitions of informatics have been developed, most of them claim that the essence of informatics is one of these concepts: information processing, algorithms, computation, information, algorithmic processes, computational processes or computational systems.

The earliest uses of the term informatics in the United States was during the 1950s with the beginning of computer use in healthcare. Early practitioners interested in the field soon learned that there were no formal education programs, and none emerged until the late 1960s. They introduced the term informatics only in the context of archival science, which is only a small part of informatics. Professional development, therefore, played a significant role in the development of health informatics. According to Imhoff et al., 2001, healthcare informatics is not only the application of computer technology to problems in healthcare, but covers all aspects of generation, handling, communication, storage, retrieval, management, analysis, discovery, and synthesis of data information and knowledge in the entire scope of healthcare. Furthermore, they stated that the primary goal of health informatics can be distinguished as follows: To provide solutions for problems related to data, information, and knowledge processing. To study general principles of processing data information and knowledge in medicine and healthcare. The term health informatics quickly spread throughout the United States in various forms such as nursing informatics, public health informatics or medical informatics. Analogous terms were later introduced for use of computers in various fields, such as business informatics, forest informatics, legal informatics etc. These fields still mainly use term informatics in context of library science.

== Informatics as information processing science ==
In the early 1980s, K.A Nicholas published "Informatics: Ready for the Information Society" proposing a definition of Informatics as "the study and the practice of skills related to information, its collection, storage, retrieval, analysis and publication. In short; - Information Handling." It had been developed in the South Australian Education System at a grass roots level. <K.A Nicholas published "Informatics: Ready for the Information Society" 1983 - National Library of Australia>

In the early 1990s, K.K. Kolin proposed an interpretation of informatics as a fundamental science that studies information processes in nature, society, and technical systems.

A broad interpretation of informatics, as "the study of the structure, algorithms, behaviour, and interactions of natural and artificial computational systems," was introduced by the University of Edinburgh in 1994. This has led to the merger of the institutes of computer science, artificial intelligence and cognitive science into a single School of Informatics in 2002.

More than a dozen nearby universities joined Scottish Informatics and Computer Science Alliance. Some non-European universities have also adopted this definition (e.g. Kyoto University School of Informatics).

In 2003, Yingxu Wang popularized term cognitive informatics, described as follows:

Supplementary to matter and energy, information is the third essence for modeling the world. Cognitive informatics focuses on internal information processing mechanisms and the natural intelligence of the brain.

Informatics as a fundamental science of information in natural and artificial systems was proposed again in Russia in 2006.

In 2007, the influential book Decoding the Universe was published.

Former president of Association for Computing Machinery, Peter Denning wrote in 2007:

The old definition of computer science - the study of phenomena surrounding computers - is now obsolete. Computing is the study of natural and artificial information processes.

The 2008 Research Assessment Exercise, of the UK Funding Councils, includes in Computer Science and Informatics a new unit of assessment (UoA), whose scope is described as follows:

The UoA includes the study of methods for acquiring, storing, processing, communicating and reasoning about information, and the role of interactivity in natural and artificial systems, through the implementation, organisation and use of computer hardware, software and other resources. The subjects are characterised by the rigorous application of analysis, experimentation and design.

In 2008, the construction of the Informatics Forum was completed. In 2018, the MIT Schwarzman College of Computing was established. Its construction is planned to be completed in 2021.

== Informatics as information science ==
In the fields of geoinformatics or irrigation informatics, the term -informatics usually mean information science, in context related to library science. This was the first meaning of informatics introduced in Russia in 1966 by A.I. Mikhailov, R.S. Gilyarevskii, and A.I. Chernyi, which referred to a scientific discipline that studies the structure and properties of scientific information. In this context, the term was also used by the International Neuroinformatics Coordinating Facility. Some scientists use this term, however, to refer to the science of information processing, not data management.

In the English-speaking world, the term informatics was first widely used in the compound medical informatics, taken to include "the cognitive, information processing, and communication tasks of medical practice, education, and research, including information science and the technology to support these tasks". Many such compounds are now in use; they can be viewed as different areas of "applied informatics".

== Informatics as computer science ==
In some countries such as Germany, Russia, France, and Italy, the term informatics in many contexts (but not always) can translate directly to computer science.

=== Related topics ===
Computer scientists study computational processes and systems. Computing Research Repository (CoRR) classification distinguishes the following main topics in computer science (alphabetic order):

- artificial intelligence
- computation and language
- computational complexity
- computational engineering, finance, and science
- computational geometry
- computational game theory
- computer vision and pattern recognition
- computers and society
- cryptography and security
- data structures and algorithms
- databases and digital libraries
- distributed, parallel and cluster computing
- emerging technologies
- formal languages and automata theory
- general literature
- graphics
- hardware architecture
- human-computer Interaction
- information retrieval
- information theory
- logic in computer science
- machine learning
- mathematical software
- multiagent systems
- multimedia
- networking and internet architecture
- neural computing and evolutionary computing
- numerical analysis
- operating systems
- other computer science
- performance
- programming languages
- robotics
- social and information networks
- software engineering
- sound
- symbolic computation
- systems and control

=== Journals and conferences ===
- Information and Computation
- Acta Informatica
- Information Processing Letters
- Neural Information Processing Systems
- Journal of Automata, Languages and Combinatorics
- International Journal of Cognitive Informatics and Natural Intelligence
- Conference on Computer Vision and Pattern Recognition)
- Symposium on Theory of Computing
- European Conference on Computer Vision
- Brain Informatics
- International Conference on Computer Vision
- International Conference on Machine Learning
- Algorithmica
- Symposium on Foundations of Computer Science)
- European Symposium on Algorithms
- Fundamenta Informaticae
- Symposium on Discrete Algorithms
- Journal of Logic and Computation
- Bioinformatics
- Neural Computing and Applications
- Autonomous Agents and Multi-Agent Systems
- International Symposium on Fundamentals of Computation Theory
- International Colloquium on Automata, Languages and Programming
- Journal of Scientific Computing
- Annual IEEE Symposium on Foundations of Computer Science
- Annual Symposium on Computational Geometry
- Simulation & Gaming
- Journal of Machine Learning Research
- Journal of Artificial Intelligence Research
- ACM Transactions on Graphics
- IEEE Transactions on Visualization and Computer Graphics
- IEEE Transactions on Computers
- IEEE/ACM International Symposium on Microarchitecture
- ACM Symposium on Computer and Communications Security
- Symposium on Parallelism in Algorithms and Architectures
- Symposium on Foundations of Computer Science

== Community ==
=== Related organisations ===
- American Society for Information Science and Technology
- Association for Computing Machinery
- Association for Logic, Language and Information
- Association for Women in Computing
- Association for the Advancement of Artificial Intelligence
- Computability in Europe
- Computer Science Teachers Association
- Computing Research Association
- European Association for Theoretical Computer Science
- Gesellschaft für Informatik
- IEEE Computer Society
- Informatics Europe
- International Federation for Information Processing
- Raspberry Pi Foundation
- Scottish Informatics and Computer Science Alliance

=== Academic schools and departments ===
- Information School at University of Washington
- College of Emergency Preparedness, Homeland Security and Cybersecurity at University at Albany, SUNY
- Department of Informatics at University of California, Irvine
- College of Literature, Science, and the Arts at University of Michigan
- School of Information at The University of Texas at Austin
- Manning College of Information & Computer Sciences at University of Massachusetts Amherst
- Texas Women's University
- College of Literature, Science, and the Arts at University of Michigan
- Department of Informatics at Indiana University Bloomington
- School of Informatics and Computing at Indiana University–Purdue University Indianapolis
- School of Information at San Jose State University
- School of Computing and Informatics at University of Louisiana at Lafayette
- Department of Computer Science at The University of Iowa
- Ira A. Fulton Schools of Engineering at Arizona State University
- School of Informatics, Computing, and Cyber Systems at Northern Arizona University
- School of Engineering and Computer Science at Baylor University
- College of Information Sciences and Technology at Pennsylvania State University
- College of Engineering and Computing at University of South Carolina
- Doctoral School of Informatics at University of Debrecen
- School of Information Sciences at University of Illinois Urbana-Champaign
- University of Sussex
- Institute for Data Science & Informatics at University of Missouri
- Norwegian University of Science and Technology
- Department of Informatics at University of Bergen
- School of Informatics at University of Edinburgh
- Department of Informatics at Technical University of Munich
- Università della Svizzera italiana
- List of Information Schools

== See also ==
- Artificial intelligence
- Behavior informatics
- Bioinformatics
- Computational theory of mind
- Computer simulation
- Data processing
- Data engineering
- Data analysis
- Entscheidungsproblem
- Information and computer science
- Information engineering
- Information science
- Information system
- Information technology
- Information theory
- Machine learning
- Materials informatics
- Models of neural computation
- Neural computation
- Quantum informatics
- Real-time computing
