= List of data science journals =

List of academic journals in data science

This is a list of data science journals which includes notable peer-reviewed academic journals in the field of data science and related fields.

== Journals ==
- ACM Transactions on Database Systems
- Annals of Statistics
- Annual Review of Biomedical Data Science
- BioData Mining
- BMC Bioinformatics
- Computational Statistics & Data Analysis
- Data & Knowledge Engineering
- Data Mining and Knowledge Discovery
- Data Technologies and Applications
- GigaScience
- Harvard Data Science Review
- International Journal of Data Science and Analytics
- International Journal of Data Warehousing and Mining
- International Journal of Population Data Science
- Journal of Big Data
- Journal of Forecasting
- Journal of Statistics and Data Science Education
- Machine Learning (journal)
- Neural Computation (journal)
- Neural Networks (journal)
- The American Statistician
- Wiley Interdisciplinary Reviews: Data Mining and Knowledge Discovery

== See also ==
- List of computer science journals
- List of statistics journals
- List of scientific journals
- List of publications in data science
- List of data science software
- List of open-source data mining software
- Big data
- Computational statistics
- Data engineering
- Data science notebook software
- Data visualization
- Machine learning
- Open data
- Special Interest Group on Knowledge Discovery and Data Mining

=== Conferences ===
- ACM Conference on Recommender Systems
- European Conference on Machine Learning and Principles and Practice of Knowledge Discovery in Databases
