= Overlay journal =

An overlay journal or overlay ejournal is a type of open access academic journal, almost always an online electronic journal (ejournal), that does not produce its own content, but selects from texts that are already freely available online. While many overlay journals derive their content from preprint servers, others, such as the Lund Medical Faculty Monthly, contain mainly papers published by commercial publishers, but with links to self-archived preprint or postprints when possible.

The editors of an overlay journal locate suitable material from open access repositories and public domain sources, read it, and evaluate its worth. This evaluation may take the form of the judgement of a single editor or editors, or a full peer review process.

Public validation of subsequently approved texts may take several forms. At its most formal, the editor may republish the article with explicit approval. Approval might take the form of an addition to the text or its metadata. Or the editor may simply link to the article, via the table of contents of the overlay journal. An alternative approach is to link to articles already published in various open access ejournals, but adding value by grouping scattered articles together as a single themed issue of the overlay journal. Such themed issues allow the focussed coverage of relatively obscure or newly emerging topics.

Episciences is an initiative by the Center for Direct Scientific Communication to host overlay journals. It hosts among others the computer science journals Logical Methods in Computer Science and Fundamenta Informaticae.

In 2019, JMIR Publications, an open access publisher, announced the creation of a series of "superjournals", named JMIRx (JMIRx.org), which are overlay journals for preprint servers such as medRxiv, bioRxiv and PsyArXiv.

== History ==
The term 'overlay journal' was first coined by Paul Ginsparg in 1996. That same year, the journal Physical Review began to link to pre-prints that they had accepted, but not yet published. It was not until later that the first overlay journals were founded, including Journal of High Energy Physics, Logical Methods in Computer Science and Geometry and Topology, all of which were overlays for arXiv.
