= Episciences =

French scientific publisher

- Website type: Publication platform
- Available in: English, French
- Website: www.episciences.org
- Commercial: No
- Launched: 2013; 13 years ago
- Current status: Online
- Written in: PHP

Episciences is an open-access academic publishing platform that covers all disciplines. It was established in 2013 by the Centre pour la communication scientifique directe (CCSD) in France and also functions as a technical infrastructure for peer review. The system is developed open source under the GPLv3 licence and available on GitHub.

The platform is specifically designed from the ground up for publishing overlay journals—open-access electronic journals whose content is drawn from articles deposited in open repositories such as HAL (open archive), arXiv, and zenodo. Since 2023, Episciences also supports submissions from the BioRxiv and MedRxiv preprint servers. It also provides interoperability with the Software Heritage archive and with research data repositories managed through dataverse. Since 2026, the system supports the Cryptology ePrint Archive.

Authors submit articles for selection in journals directly from these open repositories. Once an article is accepted for publication in a journal using the Episciences platform, the corresponding record in the source repository is updated with publication details.

As of 2024, Episciences hosts more than 37 journals and has published over 6,800 articles and by the end of 2025 the platform had 45 journals and over 7500 articles published. Journals have both launched directly on the platform, while some existing ones moved to the platform. The platform supports journals from a range of disciplines, including biomechanics, earth sciences, environment, health sciences, informatics and applied mathematics, mathematics, mechanical engineering, physics, proceedings, and social sciences and humanities.

== List of journals ==
As of 2026 there are 46 current or planned journals publishing using the Epsiciences platform.

Full Name	Publisher	Year Created	Year on Episciences
Annals of Formalized Mathematics	MathOA	2024	2024
Network analysis for social sciences	UMR8504 Géographie-cités	2016	2017
Revue africaine de recherche en informatique et mathématiques appliquées	African Society in Digital Science	2002	2016
Archéologies. Sociétés, réseaux, matériaux	Université Lumière Lyon 2	2023	2023
Communications in Mathematics	University of Ostrava	2009	2021
Compositionality	Compositionality Charitable Incorporated Organisation	2017	2024
Les Cahiers Scientifiques du Transport	AFITL	1979	2022
The SSH Data Journal	Université de Lorraine	2024	2025
Revue en didactique des langues et des cultures	Université Sorbonne Nouvelle	2025	2025
Discrete Mathematics & Theoretical Computer Science	Association DMTCS	1997	2016
Environnement, Ingénierie & Développement	INSA de Lyon	1996	2021
Electronic Publishing			2018
Electronic Notes in Theoretical Informatics and Computer Science	Inria	2022	2023
Épijournal de Didactique et Epistémologie des Mathématiques pour l'Enseignement Supérieur		2019	2019
Épijournal de Géométrie Algébrique	Association Épiga	2016	2016
Fundamenta Informaticae	Polish Mathematical Society	1977	2020
Hardy-Ramanujan Journal	Hardy-Ramanujan Society	1978	2014
Journal of Data Mining and Digital Humanities	Inria	2014	2014
Eran, Turan, Hrom: a Journal of Global Late Antiquity	Eran Turan And Hrom: Association for Global Late Antiquity	2026	2026
Journal of Functional Programming	MathOA	1991	2026
Journal Francophone de Tribologie	Association Française de Mécanique	2026	2026
journal of Groups, Complexity, Cryptology		2009	2020
Journal of Interdisciplinary Methodologies and Issues in Science	Éditions universitaires d'Avignon	2016	2016
Journal d'Interaction Personne-Système	Association Francophone d'Interaction Homme-Machine (AFIHM)	2008	2014
Journal of Nonsmooth Analysis and Optimization		2019	2019
Journal of Data- and Knowledge-integrated Simulation Science	Stuttgart Center of Simulation Science (SC SimTech)	2024	
Journal of Non-Associative Structures	MathOA	2025	2026
Journal of Philosophical Economics	Editura ASE	2007	2021
Journal on Satisfiability, Boolean Modelling and Computation	SAT Association	2006	2025
Journal of Studies of Earth's Deep Interior	ENS Éditions	2025	2025
Journal of Theoretical, Computational and Applied Mechanics	Inria	2021	2021
Logical Methods in Computer Science	Logical Methods in Computer Science e.V.	2004	2015
Multidisciplinary Biomechanics Journal	Société de Biomécanique	2024	2024
Mathematical Neuroscience and Applications	Inria	2021	2021
Management et organisations du sport	Société Savante de Management du Sport (S2MS)	2020	2020
Movement & Sport Sciences - Science & Motricité	French Association of Sport and Physical Activity Sciences (ACAPS)	1987	
Open Communications in Nonlinear Mathematical Physics	International Society of Nonlinear Mathematical Physics	2020	2021
Open Plasma Science	Université de Lorraine	2023	2023
Le partenariat de soin avec le patient : analyses	Université Côte d'Azur	2020	2024
Revue africaine de santé et de productions animales	École inter-États des sciences et médecine vétérinaires	2004	2024
Recherches en didactique des mathématiques	Association pour la Recherche en Didactique des Mathématiques (ARDM)	1980	2023
Slovo	Presses de l'Inalco	1978	2017
Sociétés plurielles	Presses de l'Inalco	2017	2017
TheoretiCS	TheoretiCS Foundation e.V.	2021	2021
Theory of Computing	Theoretical Computer Science Exchange	2004	
Transformations: A DARIAH Journal	DARIAH ERIC	2024	2024
