= FGCS =

FGCS may refer to:

- Facial gender confirmation surgery
- Female genital cosmetic surgery
- Former gifted child syndrome
- Fifth generation computer systems project
- Forest Gate Community School a school in Newham, East London
- Future Generation Computing Systems, an Elsevier scientific journal

== See also ==
- FGC (disambiguation)
