= International Journal of Technoethics =

- Discipline: Technoethics
- Language: English
- Edited by: Steven Umbrello

Publication details
- History: 2010–present
- Publisher: IGI Global
- Frequency: Biannually

Standard abbreviations
- ISO 4: Int. J. Technoethics

Indexing
- ISSN: 1947-3451 (print); 1947-346X (web)
- LCCN: sn2008075894
- OCLC no.: 318439226

Links
- Journal homepage

The International Journal of Technoethics is a biannual peer-reviewed academic journal covering ethics as it relates to science, technology, and engineering. It was established in 2010 and is published by IGI Global. The editor-in-chief is Steven Umbrello (Institute for Ethics and Emerging Technologies).

The journal is indexed by DBLP.
