= ICLP =

ICLP may stand for:

- International Chinese Language Program, an institute for Chinese language instruction in Taiwan
- International Conference on Logic Programming, an academic conference
