= Selim Akl =

Canadian professor

Selim G. Akl (Ph.D., McGill University) is a professor at Queen's University in the Queen's School of Computing, where he leads the Parallel and Unconventional Computation Group. His research interests are primarily in the area of algorithm design and analysis, in particular for problems in parallel computing and unconventional computing.

== Activities ==
Akl is currently Director of the School of Computing at Queen's University. He is editor in chief of Parallel Processing Letters published by World Scientific Publishing in 1991 and an editor of several major computing journals including:

- International Journal of Unconventional Computing (Old City Publishing; 2011)
- Computational Geometry (Elsevier; 1993)
- International Journal of Parallel, Emergent, and Distributed Systems (Taylor and Francis; 2004)

Akl is the founding editorial board member of International Journal of High Performance Computing and Networking (Inderscience Publishers; 2003 ), and a past editor of Journal of Cryptology (Springer-Verlag; 1988–1991), Information Processing Letters (North-Holland; 1989–1999), and Parallel Algorithms and Applications (Taylor and Francis; 1991–2004).

=== Current research ===
Akl created "Quantum Chess" in 2018. The purpose of Quantum Chess is not to make the game more difficult; rather, by adding the unpredictability of quantum physics to chess, humans and computers are put on a level playing field, as they both face the same difficulties posed by the weirdness of the quantum. Alice Wismath, an undergraduate summer student, wrote a program implementing one of the many versions that Akl proposed in his article On the Importance of Being Quantum in September's Parallel Processing Letters article.

Akl has claimed that the notion of universality in computation is false. Akl asserts that no machine can claim universality since there will always be a larger set of problems that such a machine cannot solve. Akl has described the non-universality in computation in more detail.

=== Conferences ===
Akl chaired the 2007 International Conference on Unconventional Computation that took place in Kingston, Ontario, Canada.

== Publications ==
Akl is the author of several textbooks in the areas of parallel computing and computational geometry:

- Parallel Sorting Algorithms (Academic Press, 1985)
- The Design and Analysis of Parallel Algorithms (Prentice Hall, 1989)
- Parallel Computation: Models and Methods (Prentice Hall, 1997).

He is also the co-author of Parallel Computational Geometry (Prentice Hall, 1993), Adaptive Cryptographic Access Control (Springer, 2010), Applications of Quantum Cryptography (LAP Lambert Academic Publishing, 2018) and From Parallel to Emergent Computing (CRC Press, 2019).

His book on Parallel Computational Geometry is considered to be the definitive work on the subject.

== Awards and recognition ==
Akl won the 2004 and 2007 Howard Staveley Award for Teaching Excellence. He received the Queen's University Prize for Excellence in Research in 2005 and the Queen's University Award for Excellence in Graduate Supervision in 2012. He served as Director of the Queen's School of Computing (2007 - 2017). In 2018, Akl was the recipient of a CS-Can/Info-Can Lifetime Achievement Award in Computer Science.
