= Keng Siau =

American academic

Academic background
- Education: National University of Singapore (BS, MS); University of British Columbia (PhD)

Academic work
- Discipline: Business management Information systems
- Sub-discipline: Digital Transformation, Business Analytics and Data Science, Technological Innovation and Entrepreneurship, Generative AI and Human-AI Collaboration, Web 3 and Metaverse, Smart Health and FinTech
- Institutions: City University of Hong Kong; University of Nebraska–Lincoln; Missouri University of Science and Technology

Keng L. Siau is a Professor working as the Head of the Department of Information Systems and Chair Professor of Information Systems at the City University of Hong Kong.

== Education ==
Siau earned a Bachelor of Science degree in computer science and Master of Science in information science from the National University of Singapore. He earned a Doctor of Business Administration from the University of British Columbia in 1996.

== Career ==
Siau previously worked at the University of Nebraska–Lincoln, where he was the Edwin J. Faulkner Chair Professor and a full professor of management. He joined the Missouri University of Science and Technology in June 2012 and has since worked as chair of the university's Department of Business and Information Technology, prior to his joining the City University of Hong Kong in 2021. Siau is editor-in-chief of the Journal of Database Management.
