= SICSA =

SICSA is an acronym which can refer to the following:

- Sasakawa International Center for Space Architecture, a research center at the University of Houston
- Vidal Sassoon International Center for the Study of Antisemitism, a research center at the Hebrew University of Jerusalem
- Scottish Informatics and Computer Science Alliance, a consortium of Scottish universities involved in computer science research and education
