= CCSC =

CCSC may refer to:

- Camille Chamoun Sports City Stadium, a stadium in Beirut, Lebanon
- Cheung Chuk Shan College, a school in Hong Kong
- Columbus Crew SC, an American soccer team
- Consortium for Computing Sciences in Colleges
- Crawfordsville Community School Corporation, a school district in Indiana, United States
- CCSC, the Kolkata Metro station code for City Center metro station, West Bengal, India

== See also ==
- CSCC (disambiguation)
