= Michael Mitzenmacher =

American computer scientist

- Education: Harvard University; University of Cambridge; University of California, Berkeley
- Awards: ACM Fellow (2014)
- Scientific career
- Fields: Algorithms
- Workplaces: Harvard University
- Doctoral advisor: Alistair Sinclair
- Website: http://mybiasedcoin.blogspot.com/

Michael David Mitzenmacher is an American computer scientist working in algorithms. He is Professor of Computer Science at the Harvard John A. Paulson School of Engineering and Applied Sciences and was area dean of computer science July 2010 to June 2013. He also runs My Biased Coin, a blog about theoretical computer science.

== Education ==
In 1986, Mitzenmacher attended the Research Science Institute. Mitzenmacher earned his AB at Harvard, where he was on the team that won the 1990 North American Collegiate Bridge Championship. He attended the University of Cambridge on a Churchill Scholarship from 1991–1992. Mitzenmacher received his PhD in computer science at the University of California, Berkeley in 1996 under the supervision of Alistair Sinclair. He joined Harvard University in 1999.

== Research ==
Mitzenmacher's research covers the design and analysis of randomised algorithms and processes. With Eli Upfal he is the author of a textbook Mitzenmacher & Upfal (2005) on randomized algorithms and probabilistic techniques in computer science. Mitzenmacher's PhD thesis was on the analysis of simple randomised load balancing schemes. He is an expert in hash function applications such as Bloom filters, cuckoo hashing, and locality-sensitive hashing. His work on min-wise independence gives a fast way to estimate similarity of electronic documents and is used in internet search engines. Mitzenmacher has also worked on erasure codes and error-correcting codes.

Mitzenmacher has authored over 100 conference and journal publications. He has served on dozens of program committees in computer science, information theory, and networks, and chaired the program committee of the Symposium on Theory of Computing in 2009. He belongs to the editorial board of SIAM Journal on Computing, Internet Mathematics, and Journal of Interconnection Networks.

== Awards and honors ==
Mitzenmacher became a fellow of the Association for Computing Machinery in 2014. His joint paper (Luby et al. 2001) on low-density parity-check codes received the 2002 IEEE Information Theory Society Best Paper Award. His joint paper (Byers et al. 1998) on fountain codes received the 2009 ACM SIGCOMM Test of Time Paper Award. In 2019, he was elected as an IEEE Fellow.

== Selected publications ==
- Mitzenmacher, Michael; Upfal, Eli (2005), Probability and Computing: Randomized Algorithms and Probabilistic Analysis, Cambridge University Press, ISBN 0-5218-3540-2
- Byers, John; Luby, Michael; Mitzenmacher, Michael; Rege, Ashutosh (1998), "A Digital Fountain Approach to Reliable Distribution of Bulk Data" (PDF), Proc. of ACM SIGCOMM 1998 There is also an earlier 1998 technical report with the same title.
- Broder, Andrei; Mitzenmacher, Michael (2005), "Network Applications of Bloom Filters: A Survey" (PDF), Internet Mathematics, 1 (4): 485–509, doi:10.1080/15427951.2004.10129096, S2CID 1560675
- Luby, Michael; Mitzenmacher, Michael; Shokrollahi, Amin; Spielman, Daniel (2001), "Improved Low-Density Parity Check Codes Using Irregular Graphs" (PDF), IEEE Transactions on Information Theory, 47 (2): 585–598, doi:10.1109/18.910576
- Mitzenmacher, Michael (September 7–9, 2009), "Some Open Questions Related to Cuckoo Hashing" (PDF), Algorithms - ESA 2009, 17th Annual European Symposium, Lecture Notes in Computer Science, Copenhagen, Denmark: Springer, pp. 1–10, doi:10.1007/978-3-642-04128-0_1
