= AMCS =

AMCS may refer to:

- The Australian Marine Conservation Society
- The International Journal of Applied Mathematics and Computer Science
