= Information Resources Management Journal =

- Discipline: Information management
- Language: English
- Edited by: George Kelley (University of Massachusetts, US)

Publication details
- History: 1988–present
- Publisher: IGI Global (United States)
- Frequency: Quarterly
- Open access: forthcoming

Standard abbreviations
- ISO 4: Inf. Resour. Manag. J.

Indexing
- ISSN: 1040-1628 (print); 1533-7979 (web)

Links
- Journal homepage; Online archive

The Information Resources Management Journal (IRMJ) is a quarterly peer-reviewed applied research academic journal which focuses on information technology management. It is published by IGI Global. The journal was established in 1988.

The journal is published in association with the Information Resources Management Association.

== Abstracting and indexing ==
The journal is abstracted and indexed by the following, among others:

- ACM Digital Library
- Compendex
- DBLP
- EBSCO
- Emerald Abstracts
- INSPEC
- Scopus
- Web of Science: Emerging Sources Citation Index (ESCI)
