= Computación y Sistemas =

- Discipline: Artificial intelligence, computer science
- Language: English
- Edited by: G. Sidorov (IPN), U. Cortés (KEMLg-UPC)

Publication details
- History: Since 1997
- Publisher: Instituto Politécnico Nacional (Mexico)
- Frequency: Quarterly

Standard abbreviations
- ISO 4: Comput. Sist.

Indexing
- ISSN: 1405-5546

Links
- Journal homepage; e-journal

Computación y Sistemas is a peer-reviewed journal on artificial intelligence and computer science research. It was established in 1997 by Adolfo Guzmán Arenas and it is published by Instituto Politécnico Nacional with the support of CONACyT.

== Abstracting and indexing ==
The journal is abstracted and indexed in DBLP, Scielo, and Scopus.

Computación y Sistemas was included in the CONACyT until 2017.

== Open-access policy ==
Computación y Sistemas provides immediate open access to its peer-reviewed content.

== Former editors-in-chief ==
- George A. Bekey (USC), Adolfo Guzmán Arenas (IPN), Ramón López de Mántaras (CSIC) and Adolfo Steiger Garçao (New University of Lisbon), 1997–2003
- George A. Bekey (USC), Juan Luis Díaz de León (IPN), Jean Paul Frédéric Serra (Centre de Morphologie Mathématique), Gerhard X. Ritter (University of Florida) and Adolfo Steiger Garçao (New University of Lisbon), 2003–2004
- Juan Luis Díaz de León (IPN), Jean Paul Frédéric Serra (Centre de Morphologie Mathématique) and Gerhard X. Ritter (University of Florida), 2004–2009
- Juan Humberto Sosa Azuela (IPN), Isaac Scherson (University of California, Irvine) and Ulises Cortés (KEMLg-UPC), 2009–2012
