= International Journal of Web Services Research =

- Discipline: Web services
- Language: English
- Edited by: Liang-Jie (LJ) Zhang

Publication details
- History: 2004–present
- Publisher: IGI Global (United States)
- Frequency: Quarterly
- Impact factor: 1.500 (2019)

Standard abbreviations
- ISO 4: Int. J. Web Serv. Res.

Indexing
- ISSN: 1545-7362 (print); 1546-5004 (web)

Links
- Journal homepage

The International Journal of Web Services Research (IJWSR) is a quarterly peer-reviewed academic journal covering web services. It was established in 2004 and is published by IGI Global. The editor-in-chief is Liang-Jie Zhang (Kingdee International Software Group in China and The Open Group).

== Abstracting and indexing ==
The journal is abstracted and indexed in:

- ACM Digital Library
- Compendex (Elsevier Engineering Index)
- DBLP
- Index Copernicus
- INSPEC (IET)
- SCOPUS
- Web of Science (All Journals)
- Web of Science Science Citation Index Expanded (SCIE)
