= Journal of Organizational and End User Computing =

- Discipline: End-user computing
- Language: English
- Edited by: Steven Walczak (University of South Florida, US)

Publication details
- History: 1989–present
- Publisher: IGI Global (United States)
- Frequency: Quarterly
- Open access: forthcoming

Standard abbreviations
- ISO 4: J. Organ. End User Comput.

Indexing
- ISSN: 1546-2234 (print); 1546-5012 (web)

Links
- Journal homepage; Online archive

The Journal of Organizational and End User Computing (JOEUC) is a quarterly peer-reviewed academic journal which focuses on end-user computing. It is published by IGI Global. The journal was established in 1989.

According to the Journal Citation Reports, the journal has a 2021 impact factor of 7.400.

== Abstracting and indexing ==
The journal is abstracted and indexed by the following, among others:

- ACM Digital Library
- Compendex
- DBLP
- EBSCO
- Emerald Abstracts
- INSPEC
- Scopus
- Web of Science:
  - Science Citation Index Expanded (SCIE)
  - Social Sciences Citation Index (SSCI)
