= Edward J. Valauskas =

American academic (born 1950)

Edward J. Valauskas (born October 3, 1950) is an American librarian and educator.

== Career ==
Valauskas has taught at the School of Library and Information Management, Emporia State University; International Centre for Information Management Systems and Services, Nicolaus Copernicus University in Toruń, Poland; Graduate School of Library and Information Science, University of Illinois at Urbana-Champaign; UC Berkeley Extension; University of Chicago Graham School of General Studies; and, Joseph Regenstein, Jr. School of the Chicago Botanic Garden. In 2016, he was elected as Director-at-Large to the Board of Management of the International Centre for Information Management Systems and Services in Toruń.

Edward has worked in a variety of libraries, including those on the campuses of the University of Illinois at Chicago and the University of Chicago as well as special libraries at the Charles E. Merriam Center for Public Administration (MCL) in Chicago; Superconducting Super Collider (SSC) Laboratory in Texas; and, United Nations Office in Geneva, Switzerland (UNOG). Most recently, he was curator of rare books at the Lenhardt Library of the Chicago Botanic Garden. He was the curator of the traveling exhibit, Plants in Print: The Age of Botanical Discovery. The exhibit opened on 1 April 2004 at the U.S. Botanic Garden in Washington, D.C. and has since appeared at the Chicago Botanic Garden, Milton Hershey School Art Museum in Hershey, Pa., Cherokee Garden Library at the Atlanta History Center, and Franklin Park Conservatory in Columbus, Ohio.

Edward has used a variety of rare herbals from the Lenhardt Library of the Chicago Botanic Garden for lectures on Renaissance science as reflected in the Harry Potter series. These talks, entitled "Harry Potter's Herbology", have occurred at the Chicago Botanic Garden. and elsewhere.

== Editing and publishing ==
Valauskas was the founder and editor-in-chief of First Monday. The journal ceased publication, after 30 years, with the May 2026 issue. Altogether, 2,482 papers appeared in 360 issues of First Monday, written by 3,703 different authors.

From September 2011 to December 2015, Valauskas wrote a monthly column, entitled "Stories from the Rare Book Collection", about rare books in the Lenhardt Library at the Chicago Botanic Garden. This column was supported in part by a grant from the National Endowment for the Humanities.

Valauskas is also the author or editor of several books related to the Internet and computing, including The Internet for Teachers and School Media Specialists (with Monica Ertel; New York: Neal-Schuman, 1996), Internet Initiative: Libraries Providing Internet Services and How They Plan, Pay, and Manage (with Nancy R. John; Chicago: ALA Editions, 1995), Internet Troubleshooter: Help for the Logged-On and Lost (with Nancy R. John; Chicago: ALA Editions, 1994), and, Macintoshed Libraries (with Bill Vaccaro; Cupertino, Calif.: Apple Library Users Group, 1987–94, six editions). He has also written a large number of papers and articles for magazines and journals.

== Paleontological work ==
Valauskas collects books on paleontology, especially books written for young readers about dinosaurs. A portion of his collection formed an exhibit at the University of Virginia entitled The Boy Who Never Grew Up: Dinosaur Books & Realia from the Collection of Edward J. Valauskas in 1998. A large number of these books and related materials were donated to Special Collections at the University of Chicago Library. "Bibliosaurus! Dinosaurs in the Popular Imagination" opened in Special Collections at the University of Chicago's Regenstein Library on January 2, 2024 and closed April 19, 2024. The exhibit was based upon materials from Edward's on-going donations to Special Collections as well as additional items on loan from the private collection of his brother, Charles Valauskas. Edward has a considerable interest in paleontology and is attempting to visit many of the Lagerstätten in the world. He has climbed to Cambrian Burgess Shale exposures in British Columbia, Canada; hunted fossils with his wife Nancy R. John in the Jurassic limestone exposed in quarries around Solnhofen and Eichstätt, Germany; and, as a youngster collected concretions with fossils of Late Carboniferous age at Pit 11 and the Mazon Creek area in Illinois (as well as in the Late Cretaceous Coon Creek Formation in McNairy County, Tennessee and around the Silurian reef exposed in the Thornton Quarry in Thornton, Illinois).
