= CSCC =

CSCC may refer to:

- Canadian Society of Clinical Chemists, a professional association
- Center for Strategic Counterterrorism Communications, a US State Department agency
- Chattanooga State Community College, a community college in Chattanooga, Tennessee, United States
- Columbia-Southern Chemical Corporation, a chemical company
- Columbus State Community College, a community college in Ohio, United States
- Cleveland State Community College, a community college in Tennessee, United States
- Creek Street Christian College, P–12 college in Bendigo, Australia
- Cutaneous squamous cell carcinoma, that is, squamous cell skin cancer
- Connecticut State Community College, a college resulting from the 2023 merger of 12 community colleges in Connecticut

== See also ==
- CCSC (disambiguation)
