= International Journal of Intelligent Information Technologies =

- Discipline: Intelligent information technologies
- Language: English
- Edited by: Vijayan Sugumaran

Publication details
- History: 2005–present
- Publisher: IGI Global
- Frequency: Quarterly

Standard abbreviations
- ISO 4: Int. J. Intell. Inf. Technol.

Indexing
- ISSN: 1548-3657 (print); 1548-3665 (web)
- LCCN: 2004212067
- OCLC no.: 608168195

Links
- Journal homepage

The International Journal of Intelligent Information Technologies is a quarterly peer-reviewed academic journal covering intelligent information technologies, especially agent-based systems. It was established in 2005 and is published by IGI Global. The editor-in-chief is Vijayan Sugumaran (Oakland University).

== Abstracting and indexing ==
The journal is abstracted and indexed in:

- ACM Digital Library
- Compendex
- DBLP
- Emerging Sources Citation Index
- Inspec
- Library and Information Science Abstracts
- Scopus
