= Kazuo Iwama (computer scientist) =

Japanese computer scientist (born 1951)

Kazuo Iwama (Japanese: 岩間一雄, born January 1, 1951) is a Japanese computer scientist who works at Kyoto University. Topics in his research include stable marriage, quantum circuits, the Boolean satisfiability problem, and algorithms on graphs.

== Education and career ==
Iwama earned bachelor's, master's, and doctoral degrees from Kyoto University in 1973, 1975, and 1980 respectively. He taught at Kyoto Sangyo University from 1978 to 1990, when he moved to Kyushu University. In 1997 he returned as a professor to Kyoto University. Currently he is working as a project professor.

== Academic service ==
Iwama became the founding president of the Asian Association for Algorithms and Computation in 2007. He was the founding editor-in-chief of the journal Algorithms, in 2008. Since 2013 he has been editor-in-chief of the Bulletin of the European Association for Theoretical Computer Science.

== Awards and honors ==
Iwama received an honorary doctorate from the University of Latvia in 2008, and was elected to the Academia Europaea in 2012.

== Selected publications ==
- Asahiro, Yuichi; Iwama, Kazuo; Tamaki, Hisao; Tokuyama, Takeshi (2000), "Greedily finding a dense subgraph", Journal of Algorithms, 34 (2): 203–221, doi:10.1006/jagm.1999.1062, MR 1734799.
- Iwama, Kazuo; Kambayashi, Yahiko; Yamashita, Shigeru (2002), "Transformation rules for designing CNOT-based quantum circuits", Proceedings of the 39th Annual Design Automation Conference (DAC '02), New York, NY, USA: ACM, pp. 419–424, doi:10.1145/513918.514026, ISBN 1-58113-461-4, S2CID 1064293.
- Manlove, David F.; Irving, Robert W.; Iwama, Kazuo; Miyazaki, Shuichi; Morita, Yasufumi (2002), "Hard variants of stable marriage" (PDF), Theoretical Computer Science, 276 (1–2): 261–279, doi:10.1016/S0304-3975(01)00206-7, MR 1896356, S2CID 2964971.
- Iwama, Kazuo; Tamaki, Suguru (2004), "Improved upper bounds for 3-SAT", Proceedings of the Fifteenth Annual ACM-SIAM Symposium on Discrete Algorithms, ACM, New York, pp. 328–329, MR 2291068.
