= IGI Global =

American academic publisher

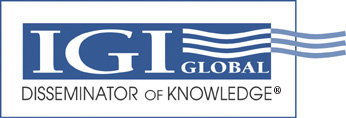
- Predecessor: Idea Group Inc.
- Founded: 1988
- Country of origin: United States
- Headquarters location: Hershey, Pennsylvania
- Key people: Mehdi Khosrow-Pour (CEO)
- Publication types: Books, journals, ebooks
- Nonfiction topics: science
- Imprints: Information Science Reference, Business Science Reference, Medical Information Science Reference, Engineering Science Reference, e-Robotic Press, and IGI Publishing
- Official website: igi-global.com

IGI Global (formerly Idea Group Inc.) is a U.S.-based international academic publishing company headquartered in Hershey, Pennsylvania that publishes books and academic journals across a variety of subject areas. In 2019, IGI Global was assessed in a Springer Nature white paper as the 7th largest scientific, medical, and technical (STM) publisher. The company has been accused of engaging in predatory publishing and criticized for its handling of plagiarism.

IGI Global is listed as a member of the Committee on Publication Ethics (COPE). It is also listed as a SHERPA/RoMEO blue publisher and employs a hybrid model of Open Access for its journals. IGI Global uses a double-blind peer review process for its books and journals.

== History ==
IGI Global (originally Idea Group Inc.) was founded in 1988 by a former professor at the Pennsylvania State University (USA). The organization started as a publisher of research content in the field of information science and technology as it is applied to multiple disciplines, such as education, library science, healthcare, public administration, and computer science. In 2002, IGI Global began offering content in electronic formats.

In 2007 and 2008, two blog posts by Debora Weber-Wulff and Ian Bogost noted that IGI Global may engage in "write-only publishing" of its books, as recorded in a later journal article.

Until 2009, IGI Global publications were manually typeset. After this date, it built an in-house workflow management system to produce its publications.

In 2018, over 150 IGI Global publications were indexed by Scopus. In 2019, IGI Global was assessed in a Springer Nature white paper as the 7th largest scientific, medical, and technical (STM) publisher in a top ten list of publishers, with a total of 116 books, 2,286 chapters, 2,339 citations, and an average of 20 citations per book.

In 2021, Nick Newcomer, senior director of marketing and sales for IGI Global, writing for Research Information, claimed that IGI Global's small-run monographs are aimed at promoting Diversity, Equity, and Inclusion (DEI) for its authors, which resulted in what he called "malicious mislabeling". The same year, an editorial piece in the journal Interpreting criticized IGI Global's handling of plagiarism. As of 2021, Beall's List listed IGI Global as a vanity press, noting that it is a member of COPE.

In 2023, IGI Global was assessed against other academic publishers by Lithuanian experts and compared with the Norwegian Register for Scientific Journals, Series and Publishers, where it is assessed at "Level 1", meaning that it meets the minimum requirements to be considered scientific. Also in 2023, IGI Global's InfoSci Database was a collection of all of its 7.300+ reference books, handbooks, and encyclopedias, and c.30,000+ peer-reviewed journal articles (with 1,000,000+ citation references), including indexing by Scopus and Web of Science. IGI Global provides libraries with access to e-books in 11 core subject areas, with contributions by over 100,000 international researchers and experts. In July 2023, the AI-powered Zendy Research Library signed a licensing agreement with IGI Global.

In April 2024, nearly 90% of IGI Global's frontlist books were indexed by Scopus.

== Imprints ==
IGI Global publishes English language content under the following five imprints:

- Information Science Reference
- Medical Information Science Reference
- Business Science Reference
- Engineering Science Reference
- e-Robotic Press

In February 2026, IGI Global launched a fifth imprint, e-Robotic Press. They are focused on releasing content for children ages 6-12. Their first project was a children’s book, titled “The Journey of Jason the Frog, AI Robot.” Jason the Frog is an anthropomorphic frog-inspired AI robot, who is sent to accompany his developer, Professor Codewell’s son, Max, to different cities. The books give factual information about the city in which Jason and Max are exploring, as well as information about the prospects of artificial intelligence (AI). There are several versions of the book, each one about a different city Jason is touring. The books are co-written by Medhi Khosrow-Pour (credited as Prof. M.K. Pour), IGI Global’s CEO, and his wife, Olga Khosrow-Pour, and illustrated by Courtney Fritz, the Managing Editor of e-Robotic Press.

== Journals ==
IGI Global publishes a number of academic journals including:

- Journal of Cases on Information Technology
- International Journal of Data Warehousing and Mining
- Journal of Database Management
- International Journal of e-Collaboration
- Journal of Global Information Management
- Information Resources Management Journal
- International Journal of Intelligent Information Technologies
- International Journal of Mobile and Blended Learning
- Journal of Organizational and End User Computing
- International Journal on Semantic Web and Information Systems
- International Journal of Technoethics
- International Journal of Web Services Research
