= International Conference on Logic Programming =

Academic conference series on logic programming

The International Conference on Logic Programming (ICLP) is an academic conference on the topic of logic programming, one of the main programming paradigms. It is organized annually by the Association for Logic Programming (ALP). The conference consists of peer-reviewed papers with the post-proceedings published in the international journal Theory and Practice of Logic Programming (TPLP), published by Cambridge University Press. The acceptance rate for TPLP papers is about 20%. Technical Communications are published as Electronic Proceedings in Theoretical Computer Science.

The first ICLP was held in September 1982 in Marseille, France; the complete list is available on the ALP website. Every 4 years, ICLP is held in conjunction with several other logic conferences, in the Federated Logic Conferences (FLoC) series.

ICLP ranks as A (top 14.55%) in the CORE conference ranking.
