= Electronic Proceedings in Theoretical Computer Science =

Electronic Proceedings in Theoretical Computer Science is an international, peer-reviewed, open access series published by Open Publishing Association reporting research results in theoretical computer science, especially in the form of proceedings and post-proceedings of conferences and workshops, in the field of theoretical computer science. As of December 2009, the editor-in-chief of the series is Rob van Glabbeek. The series is indexed by the Digital Bibliography & Library Project (DBLP).

The series uses an overlay system, where papers are hosted on arXiv, and get assigned DOIs upon acceptance.
