= Liang-Jie Zhang =

American computer scientist

Liang-Jie (LJ) Zhang (Chinese: 张良杰; pinyin: Zhāng Liángjié) is a computer scientist, a former Research Staff Member at IBM Thomas J. Watson Research Center, Senior Vice President, Chief Scientist, & Director of Research at Kingdee International Software Group Company Limited, and previously a director of The Open Group.

== Education ==
Liang-Jie Zhang received his bachelor's degree from Xidian University in 1990 and master's degree from Xi'an Jiaotong University in 1992. Then he received his Ph.D. on pattern recognition and intelligent control from Tsinghua University in 1996.

== Career ==
He joined IBM China Research Lab as a Staff Research Member in 1996. He then joined Polytechnical University as a postdoctoral scientist (May 1997 – March 1998) before joining the IBM Thomas J. Watson Research Center in March 1998. He chaired the Services Computing Professional Interest Community at IBM Research from 2004 to 2006. He also chaired the IEEE Computer Society's Technical Committee on Services Computing from 2005 to 2008. He was the lead IBM researcher on Service-Oriented Architecture (SOA) solutions, web services, and interactive media systems. More specifically, he was the designer of HyperChain Framework and a lead architect for the IBM HotVideo Hyper Video technology (which won the CNET/PC Expo's "Best of Show Software Award" in 2000.)

Zhang has served as the editor-in-chief of the International Journal of Web Services Research since 2003 and is the founding editor-in-chief of IEEE Transactions on Services Computing.

== Awards and honors ==
In 2009, he was selected as an ACM Distinguished Member. Zhang was elected as a Fellow of the IEEE in 2011, and in the same year won the IEEE Technical Achievement Award "for pioneering contributions to Application Design Techniques in Services Computing".

== Publications ==
LJ Zhang is co-author of PL/M Program Design Skills & Examples For Intel Micro-controller, by Liang-Jie Zhang, Sheng Lin, Cun-Kui Fan, Science Press (China Academy Of Science), ISBN 7-03-004736-2,. 1996, and editor of five published books of IEEE and other major conference proceedings on web services:

- Liang-Jie Zhang, Mario Jeckle (ed.), Web Services, Proceedings of the 2004 European Conference on Web Services (ECOWS 2004), Sept. 28–29, 2004, Erfurt, Germany, Springer.
- Liang-Jie Zhang, Minglu Li, Amit P. Sheth, Keith G Jeffery, Proceedings of IEEE International Conference on Services Computing (SCC 2004), IEEE Computer Society Press, 2004
- Mario Jeckle, Liang-Jie Zhang (ed.), Web Services Computing, Proceedings of the 2003 International Conference on Web Services – Europe (ICWS-Europe’03), Spring-Bergle, LNCS 2853, Sept. 23–24, 2003, Erfurt, Germany.
- Liang-Jie Zhang, et al. (eds.): Proceedings of the 2003 International Conference on Web Services (ICWS’03), CSREA Press, ISBN 1-892512-49-1, (2003)
- Jen-Yao Chung, Liang-Jie Zhang, Proceedings of IEEE International Conference on E-Commerce (CEC’03), IEEE Computer Society Press, 2003

Zhang is also the author of 74 book chapters and other technical papers on his subject. He also holds over 35 patents. His tutorial on Grid computing applications has been widely cited.
