= Bernadette Bouchon-Meunier =

French computer scientist

Bernadette Bouchon-Meunier is a retired French computer scientist specializing in fuzzy logic. She is a director of research, emeritus, for the French National Centre for Scientific Research (CNRS), the former head of the Department of Databases and Machine Learning (DAPA) in LIP6, a computer science laboratory operated jointly by CNRS and Pierre and Marie Curie University, editor-in-chief of the International Journal of Uncertainty, Fuzziness and Knowledge-Based Systems, and a past president of the IEEE Computational Intelligence Society.

== Education and career ==
Bouchon-Meunier studied at the École normale supérieure Paris-Saclay and has bachelor's and doctoral degrees from Pierre and Marie Curie University. Her work in fuzzy logic began in 1973, through the analysis of natural-language responses to survey questionnaires in sociology.

She is editor-in-chief of the International Journal of Uncertainty, Fuzziness and Knowledge-Based Systems, and was president of the IEEE Computational Intelligence Society for 2020 and 2021.

== Recognition ==
Bouchon-Meunier was the 2012 recipient of the IEEE Computational Intelligence Society Meritorious Service Award, the 2018 recipient of the society's Fuzzy Systems Pioneer Award, and the 2024 recipient of the IEEE Frank Rosenblatt Award.

She was named as an IEEE Fellow in 2011, "for contributions to theoretical foundations for reasoning and applications to practical devices". She is also a Fellow of the International Fuzzy Systems Association.
