= Journal of Cases on Information Technology =

- Discipline: Information technology
- Language: English
- Edited by: Andrew Borchers (Lipscomb University, US)

Publication details
- History: 1999–present
- Publisher: IGI Global (United States)
- Frequency: Quarterly
- Open access: forthcoming

Standard abbreviations
- ISO 4: J. Cases Inf. Technol.

Indexing
- ISSN: 1548-7717 (print); 1548-7725 (web)

Links
- Journal homepage; Online archive

The Journal of Cases on Information Technology (JCIT) is a quarterly peer-reviewed applied research academic journal which focuses on information technology. It is published by IGI Global. The journal was established in 1999.

== Abstracting and indexing ==
The journal is abstracted and indexed by the following, among others:

- ACM Digital Library
- Compendex
- DBLP
- Inspec
- Scopus
- Web of Science: Emerging Sources Citation Index (ESCI)
