= Józef Korbicz =

Engineering professor

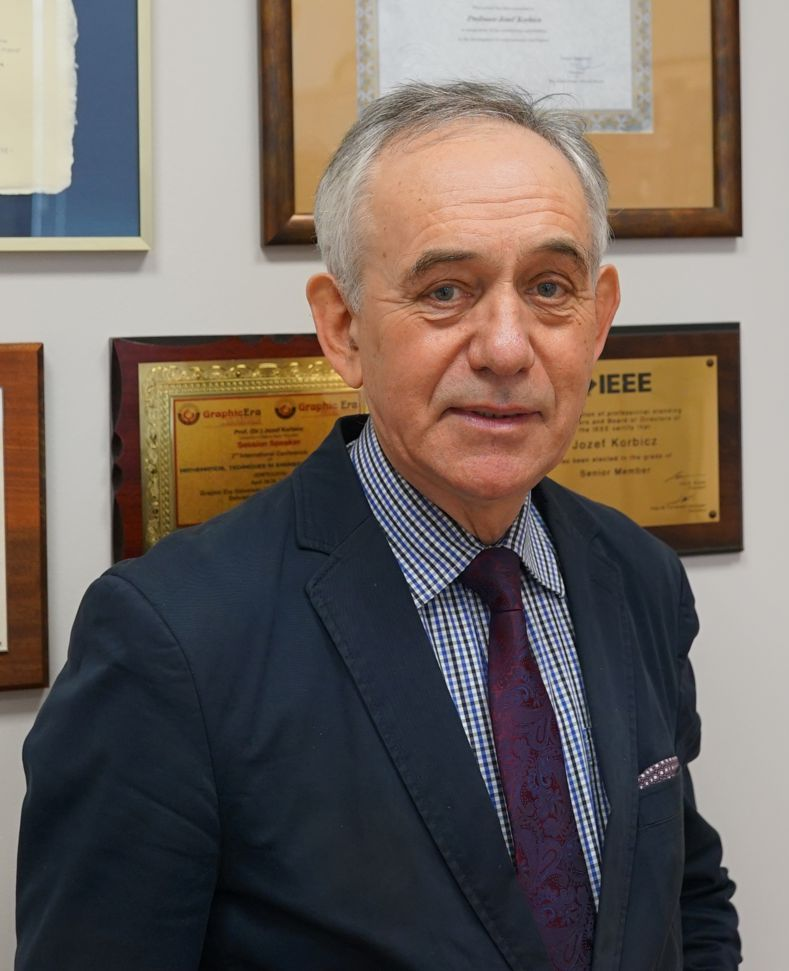

Józef Korbicz (born 1951) is a Polish engineer, a full professor at the University of Zielona Góra, Poland, and a full member of the Polish Academy of Sciences in Warsaw.

== Main research activity ==
His scientific research covers diagnostics of processes and systems using analytical methods and intelligent computations (artificial neural networks, fuzzy systems, evolutionary algorithms, and expert systems). He is an author or co-author of several scientific monographs and books published by renowned houses, as well as countless research papers. Also, he has been an IREX (USA) and a DAAD (Germany) scholarship holder.

== Top organisational achievements ==
He is a former two-term chairman of the Committee on Automatic Control and Robotics of the Polish Academy of Sciences, and the current chairman of the Commission for Computer Science and Automatic Control of the Polish Academy of Sciences – Poznań Branch, as well as of the Scientific Council of the Institute of Systems Research of the Polish Academy of Sciences. He is also a former member of the Polish Central Commission for Scientific Degrees and Titles and a vice-head of its Technical Sciences Section.

He is the founder (1992) and a former long-time director of the Institute of Control and Computation Engineering of the University of Zielona Góra, as well as the university's former deputy rector for scientific research and international cooperation.

He is also the founder (1991) and ever since Editor-in-Chief of the International Journal of Applied Mathematics and Computer Science (AMCS).

== Key memberships ==
He is a member of the IFAC and a life senior member of the IEEE.
