= Journal of Global Information Management =

- Discipline: Information management
- Language: English
- Edited by: Justin Zhang

Publication details
- History: 1993–present
- Publisher: IGI Global (United States)
- Frequency: Quarterly
- Impact factor: 4.5 (2023)

Standard abbreviations
- ISO 4: J. Glob. Inf. Manag.

Indexing
- CODEN: JGLMEY
- ISSN: 1062-7375 (print); 1533-7995 (web)
- LCCN: 94659018
- OCLC no.: 608821612

Links
- Journal homepage

The Journal of Global Information Management is a quarterly peer-reviewed academic journal covering information management. It was established in 1993 and is published by IGI Global. The editor-in-chief is Justin Zhang (University of North Florida).

== Abstracting and indexing ==
The journal is abstracted and indexed in:

- Compendex
- Current Contents/Social & Behavioral Sciences
- EBSCO databases
- Emerald Abstracts
- Inspec
- Scopus
- Social Sciences Citation Index

According to the Journal Citation Reports, the journal has a 2023 impact factor of 4.5.
