= Computational Mechanics (journal) =

- Discipline: Engineering
- Language: English
- Edited by: Peter Wriggers

Publication details
- History: 1986-present
- Publisher: Springer (Germany)
- Frequency: Monthly
- Impact factor: 4.014 (2020)

Standard abbreviations
- ISO 4: Comput. Mech.

Indexing
- ISSN: 0178-7675

Links
- Journal homepage

Computational Mechanics is a monthly scientific journal focused on computational mechanics. It is published by Springer and was founded in 1986. The journal reports original research in computational mechanics. It focuses on areas that involve the rational application of mechanics, mathematics, and numerical methods in the practice of modern engineering.

Areas covered include solid and structural mechanics, multi-body system dynamics, constitutive modeling, inelastic and finite deformation response, and structural control. The journal also covers fluid mechanics and fluid-structure interactions, biomechanics, free-surface and two-fluid flows, aerodynamics, fracture mechanics and structural integrity, multi-scale mechanics, particle and meshfree methods, transport phenomena, and heat transfer. Lastly, the journal publishes modern variational methods in mechanics in general.

According to the Journal Citation Reports, the journal has a 2020 impact factor of 4.014.
