= International Journal of Wavelets, Multiresolution and Information Processing =

- Discipline: Computer science, Engineering, Mathematics
- Language: English
- Edited by: Yuan Y. Tang

Publication details
- History: 2003
- Publisher: World Scientific (Singapore)
- Impact factor: 0.463 (2016)

Standard abbreviations
- ISO 4: Int. J. Wavelets Multiresolution Inf. Process.

Indexing
- ISSN: 0219-6913 (print); 1793-690X (web)

Links
- Journal homepage; Online access

The International Journal of Wavelets, Multiresolution and Information Processing has been published since 2003 by World Scientific. It covers both theory and application of wavelet analysis, multiresolution, and information processing in a variety of disciplines in science and engineering.

== Abstracting and indexing ==
The journal is abstracted and indexed in:

- Mathematical Reviews
- Zentralblatt MATH
- Science Citation Index Expanded
- CompuMath Citation Index
- Current Contents/Engineering, Computing, and Technology
- Compendex
- INSPEC
- ISI

Editor-in-Chief: Yuan Yan Tang

Managing Editor: Luoqing Li
