= Research on Language and Computation =

- Discipline: Computational linguistics, natural language processing
- Language: English

Publication details
- History: 2003-2010
- Publisher: Springer Science+Business Media
- Frequency: Quarterly

Standard abbreviations
- ISO 4: Res. Lang. Comput.

Indexing
- ISSN: 1570-7075 (print); 1572-8706 (web)
- OCLC no.: 605141752

Links
- Journal homepage

Research on Language and Computation was a quarterly peer-reviewed academic journal covering research in computational linguistics and natural language processing. It was established in 2003 and ceased publication in December 2010. The journal was published by Springer Science+Business Media.

== Abstracting and indexing ==
The journal is abstracted and indexed in:

- Bibliography of Linguistic Literature
- CompuScience
- CSA Linguistics and Language Behavior Abstracts
- Digital Mathematics Registry
- Scopus
