= Centre pour la communication scientifique directe =

Organization in France promoting open access to research

Centre pour la Communication Scientifique Directe (CCSD)
- Logo of the CCSD

Department overview
- Formed: 2000
- Headquarters: 28 rue Louis Guérin 69100 Villeurbanne - France
- Website: ccsd.cnrs.fr

The Centre pour la Communication Scientifique Directe (CCSD) is a French organization of the Centre National de la Recherche Scientifique (CNRS) devoted to the development of the open access repositories HAL, TEL and MediHal, the web platform Episciences and the web platform Sciencesconf. It is involved in the international open access movement.

== Presentation ==
The CCSD (translated by Centre for Direct Scientific Communication) was founded in 2000 by CNRS.

Its main activity is focused on the development and exploitation of the open archive for scholarly publications HAL, and for thesis and dissertations TEL. They comply with the Open Archive Initiative (OAI-PMH).

In 2006, French universities, engineering schools and research institutions decided to set up a shared archive based on HAL, adopting the common references of the archive. HAL is a common archive that is available in several environments: institutional (Hal-INRIA or Hal-INSERM), thematic (Hal-SHS for the humanities and social sciences, for example), and typological (theses, images).

The CCSD is involved in the Bibliothèque Scientifique Numérique (BSN or Digital Science Library), especially in the working group BSN4 (open archives).

CCSD also develops MédiHAL, open repository for scientific images and iconographic documents of science and SciencesConf.org, management tool for monitoring scientific events. Both were created in 2010.

== See also ==
- Isidore (platform)
- HAL (open archive)
- CNRS
- Episciences

== Bibliography ==
- D. Charnay, The Centre for Direct Scientific Communication, Information Services and Use, 2003, Vol 23(2), pp. 133–137
