= International Journal of Population Data Science =

- Discipline: Demography
- Language: English
- Edited by: Kerina Jones

Publication details
- History: 2017–present
- Publisher: Swansea University (United Kingdom)
- Frequency: Upon acceptance
- Open access: Yes
- License: Creative Commons Attribution

Standard abbreviations
- ISO 4: Int. J. Popul. Data Sci.

Indexing
- ISSN: 2399-4908
- LCCN: 2019243015
- OCLC no.: 1048193321

Links
- Journal homepage

International Journal of Population Data Science, also known as IJPDS, is a peer-reviewed open-access journal publishing original research on issues in population data science and administrative data linkage to advance population study across health, education, environment and other domains. It was established in 2017 in partnership with the International Population Data Linkage Network (IPDLN).

== Scope ==
The journal publishes articles under four categories of population data science: (1) Data use for population impact; (2) Bringing together and analysing data from multiple sources; (3) Identifying population level insights; and (4) Developing safe, privacy-sensitive and ethical infrastructure to support research.

== Abstracting and indexing ==
The journal is indexed in the Directory of Open Access Journals, PubMed, MEDLINE, PubMed Central, Europe PMC, Scopus, ResearchGate and WorldCat, among other scientific publication indexes and directories. Based on its CiteScore metric of 1.6 in 2017–2020, the journal ranked in the top tercile out of 109 tracked journals of similar scope.

== Contents ==
Research published in the journal has found that enhancing public policy relevance of data linkage studies can help ensure social legitimacy. The journal also occasionally publishes themed collections. In 2020, the journal issued a call for papers on the theme "Population data science for COVID-19". Given the unprecedented impacts of the global pandemic, health data researchers identified and published their recommendations for approaches to timely and equitable data sharing for research and analysis.

In 2021, the journal issued a call for papers on the theme "Work designed to influence policy and practice."

== Editorial Board ==
The journal's Founding Editor-in-Chief is Professor Kerina Jones of Swansea University, UK, and the journal's Deputy Editor is Professor Kim McGrail from the University of Columbia, Canada. Together they lead a panel of 17 international editors.

== See also ==
- International Population Data Linkage Network
- Population Health Research Network (PHRN), Western Australia
- Administrative Data Research UK (ADR UK)
- Heath Data Research UK (HDR UK)
- Secure Anonymised Information Linkage (SAIL) Databank, Swansea University
- Health Data Research Network Canada
- Population Data BC, British Columbia, Canada
- "Actionable Intelligence for Social Policy (AISP) is an initiative that focuses on the development and use of integrated data systems (IDSs) for policy analysis and program reform". University of Pennsylvania.
- ICES (Formally the Institute for Clinical Evaluative Sciences, Ontario, Canada
