= HAL (open archive) =

French open-access repository

- Website type: Research archive
- Available in: French, Spanish, Mandarin, English, German, Italian, Arabic.
- Headquarters: Lyon, France
- Owner: Centre pour la communication scientifique directe (CCSD)
- Website: https://hal.science/
- Commercial: no
- Registration: Free
- Launched: 2001
- Current status: Active

HAL is an open archive where authors can deposit scholarly documents from all academic fields.

Documents in HAL are uploaded either by one of the authors with the consent of the others or by an authorized person on their behalf. An uploaded document does not need to have been published or even to be intended for publication. As an open-access repository, HAL complies with the Open Archives Initiative (OAI-PMH) as well as with the European OpenAIRE project.

HAL was started in 2001 by Franck Laloë, initially at École normale supérieure (ENS), and was later transferred to the Centre pour la communication scientifique directe (CCSD); other French institutions, such as Institute for Research in Computer Science and Automation (Inria), have joined the system. While it is primarily directed towards French academics, participation is not restricted to them.

== See also ==
- arXiv – Online archive of e-prints
- H-net – Website for scholars in the humanities and social sciences
- Public Library of Science (PLOS) – Nonprofit open-access publisher
- List of preprint repositories
- List of academic databases and search enginesn
- Open access (publishing)
- Open access in France

== History ==
Originally, HAL was the backronym for Hyper Articles en Ligne. It is no longer in use after the Centre pour la communication scientifique directe (CCSD) changed its visual identity.
