= Journal of Computing Sciences in Colleges =

- Discipline: Computer science and education
- Language: English

Publication details
- Former name: Journal of Computing in Small Colleges
- History: 1986–present
- Publisher: Consortium for Computing Sciences in Colleges (United States)
- Frequency: Bimonthly

Standard abbreviations
- ISO 4: J. Comput. Sci. Coll.

Indexing
- ISSN: 1937-4771 (print); 1937-4763 (web)
- LCCN: 2007212567
- OCLC no.: 971950737

Links
- Journal homepage; Online access at ACM Digital Library

The Journal of Computing Sciences in Colleges is a bimonthly peer-reviewed, open access academic journal published by the Consortium for Computing Sciences in Colleges (CCSC) covering topics associated with computer science, education, and current technologies and methods in these areas. The journal also publishes the proceedings from the conferences held annually in each of the CCSC regions.

The journal was established in 1985 as the Journal of Computing in Small Colleges.

== Abstracting and indexing ==
This journal is indexed by:

- ACM Computing Reviews
- ACM Digital Library
- ACM Guide to Computing Literature

== See also ==
- Association for Computing Machinery
- ACM Technical Symposium on Computer Science Education
- Computer Science Teachers Association
