= Journal of Advances in Information Fusion =

- Discipline: Information integration
- Language: English
- Edited by: Uwe D. Hanebeck

Publication details
- History: 2006–present
- Publisher: International Society of Information Fusion
- Frequency: Biannual
- Open access: Yes

Standard abbreviations
- ISO 4: J. Adv. Inf. Fusion

Indexing
- ISSN: 1557-6418
- LCCN: 2005215160
- OCLC no.: 61387803

Links
- Journal homepage

The Journal of Advances in Information Fusion is a biannual peer-reviewed open access scientific journal covering information integration. It was established in 2006 and is the official journal of the International Society of Information Fusion. The journal is abstracted and indexed in Scopus and in Ei Compendex.

== Editors ==
The following persons are or have been editors-in-chief:

- William Dale Blair (2006–2013)
- Uwe D. Hanebeck (2014–present)
