= E-Informatica Software Engineering Journal =

e-Informatica Software Engineering Journal
- Discipline: Software engineering
- Language: English
- Edited by: Zbigniew Huzar, Lech Madeyski

Publication details
- History: 2007-present
- Publisher: Wrocław University of Science and Technology (Poland)
- Frequency: Yearly
- Open access: Yes

Standard abbreviations
- ISO 4: e-Informatica Softw. Eng. J.

Indexing
- ISSN: 1897-7979 (print); 2084-4840 (web)

Links
- Journal homepage; Online access; Online archive

e-Informatica Software Engineering Journal is a peer-reviewed open access academic journal on software engineering (especially in experimentation and machine learning). The journal was established in 2007 and is published by the Wrocław University of Science and Technology. The editors-in-chief are Zbigniew Huzar and Lech Madeyski.

== Abstracting and indexing ==
The journal is abstracted and indexed by the Emerging Sources Citation Index, Scopus, Applied Science & Technology Source, Compendex, and Computer & Applied Sciences, DBLP
