= ICT Express =

- Discipline: Information and Communications Technology
- Language: English
- Edited by: Eun-Soo Kim

Publication details
- History: 2015–present
- Publisher: Elsevier on behalf of The Korean Institute of Communications Information Sciences (South Korea)
- Frequency: Quarterly
- Open access: Yes

Standard abbreviations
- ISO 4: ICT Express

Indexing
- ISSN: 2405-9595 (print); 2405-9595 (web)
- OCLC no.: 927919822

Links
- Journal homepage; Online access

ICT Express is a peer-reviewed scientific journal of Information and Communications Technology established in 2015. It is published four times a year by Elsevier on behalf of The Korean Institute of Communications Information Sciences. The journal is edited by Eun-Soo Kim.

== Indexing and abstracting ==
The journal is abstracted and indexed in the following bibliographic databases:

- Korea Citation Index (KCI)
- Scopus
- Emerging Sources Citation Index (ESCI)
- Science Citation Index Expanded (SCIE)
- Directory of Open Access Journals (DOAJ)
- INSPEC
- Google Scholar
- Ei Compendex

According to Scopus, the journal has a 2019 CiteScore of 5.9.
