= Archives of Computational Methods in Engineering =

- Discipline: Engineering
- Language: English
- Edited by: Michael Kleiber and Eugenio Oñate

Publication details
- History: 1994–present
- Publisher: Springer
- Open access: Hybrid
- Impact factor: 8.967 (2021)

Standard abbreviations
- ISO 4: Arch. Comput. Methods Eng.

Indexing
- ISSN: 1134-3060 (print); 1886-1784 (web)
- OCLC no.: 288978543

Links
- Journal homepage

Archives of Computational Methods in Engineering is a scholarly journal that provides a forum for spreading results of research and advanced industrial practice in computational engineering with particular emphasis on mechanics and its related areas. It publishes reviews presenting developments in computational engineering.

== Subjects covered ==
Areas of research published in the journal include modeling; solution techniques and applications of computational methods in areas including liquid and gas dynamics, solid and structural mechanics, biomechanics); variational formulations and numerical algorithms related to implementation of the finite and boundary element methods; finite difference and finite volume methods and other computational methods.

== Impact factor ==
The journal has a 2020 impact factor of 7.302.

== Indexing ==
Among others, the journal is abstracted and indexed in Google Scholar, Index to Scientific Reviews, Journal Citation Reports/Science Edition, OCLC, Science Citation Index Expanded (SciSearch), SCOPUS, Summon by Serial Solutions, VINITY - Russian Academy of Science and Zentralblatt Math.

== Editorial board ==
The editors-in-chief of the journal are Michael Kleiber (Institute of Fundamental Technological Research, Polish Academy of Sciences, Warsaw) and Eugenio Oñate (School of Civil Engineering and CIMNE - Technical University of Catalonia (UPC), Barcelona, Spain).
