= International Journal of Uncertainty, Fuzziness and Knowledge-Based Systems =

- Discipline: Computer science
- Language: English
- Edited by: Bernadette Bouchon-Meunier

Publication details
- History: 1993–present
- Publisher: World Scientific (Singapore)
- Frequency: Bimonthly
- Impact factor: 1.214 (2016)

Standard abbreviations
- ISO 4: Int. J. Uncertain. Fuzziness Knowl.-Based Syst.
- MathSciNet: Internat. J. Uncertain. Fuzziness Knowledge-Based Systems

Indexing
- ISSN: 0218-4885 (print); 1793-6411 (web)

Links
- Journal homepage

The International Journal of Uncertainty, Fuzziness and Knowledge-Based Systems was founded in 1993 and is published bimonthly by World Scientific. It covers research on methodologies for the management of uncertainty. Topics include expositions on methods such as Bayesian and probabilistic methods, nonstandard logic, as well as applications, such as in image processing, conflict resolution, and databases. The journal does not publish papers on pure fuzzy mathematics, such as fuzzy topology or fuzzy algebra.

== Abstracting and indexing ==
The journal is abstracted and indexed in:

- Science Citation Index Expanded
- ISI Alerting Services
- CompuMath Citation Index
- Current Contents/Engineering, Computing & Technology
- ACM Guide to Computing Literature
- Mathematical Reviews
- Inspec
- Zentralblatt MATH
- Compendex
