= International Journal of Mathematics and Computer Science =

The International Journal of Mathematics and Computer Science (online: ISSN 1814-0432, print: ISSN 1814-0424) is a quarterly peer-reviewed scientific journal which was established in 2006 and publishes original papers in the broad subjects of mathematics and computer science. It is abstracted and indexed by Clarivate Analytics (Thomson Reuters previously), Scopus, Zentralblatt Math, and Mathematical Reviews. The editor-in-chief is Professor Badih Ghusayni.
