= International Journal of Computer Processing of Languages =

International Journal of Computer Processing Of Languages
- Discipline: Computer science
- Language: English
- Edited by: Kam-Fai Wong

Publication details
- Former name: International Journal of Computer Processing of Oriental Languages
- History: 1983-2012
- Publisher: World Scientific

Standard abbreviations
- ISO 4: Int. J. Comput. Process. Lang.

Indexing
- ISSN: 1793-8406 (print); 2010-0205 (web)

Links
- Journal homepage

The International Journal of Computer Processing of Languages is a peer-reviewed academic journal established in 1983 as the International Journal of Computer Processing of Oriental Languages. It was published by World Scientific and covers research in various forms of human communication—visual, graphical, sign and textual—while also considering cultural and application differences. Some areas of focus include computational linguistics, information extraction and retrieval, and sign and graphical languages processing. As of 2009, the editor-in-chief was Kam-Fai Wong (Chinese University of Hong Kong).

The journal ceased publication in June 2012 with Volume 24 Issue 2.

== Abstracting and indexing ==
The journal is abstracted and indexed in Inspec and Linguistics and Language Behavior Abstracts.
