= Isidore (platform) =

ISIDORE
- Website type: scientific research, Search Engine in Humanities and Social Sciences
- Available in: French; English; Spanish
- Headquarters: Paris (Île de France), {{{location_country}}}
- Owner: Huma-Num
- Website: https://isidore.science
- Commercial: no
- Launched: 8 December 2009
- Current status: active

ISIDORE is an online platform that allows research and access to human and social sciences digital data. It's a research assistant for humanists researchers over the world.

== Detailed history and road map ==
ISIDORE was created in 2009 by the CNRS, using its "Adonis large equipment" facilities, with a major participation from french companies Antidot, Sword and Mondeca. It is now fully integrated to the Huma-Num research infrastructure for humanities and social sciences. Conceived by the TGE Adonis team following a study on the creation of a portal in humanities and social sciences, the site was started in 2009 and offered in Beta version from 2010. It was implemented by the Center for Direct Scientific Communication (CCSD) with support from Antidot, Sword and Mondeca between 2010 and 2015. Piloted and operated directly by Huma-Num since 2016, the platform brings together a large number of data producers from around the world: electronic publishing platforms (Cairn.info, Persée, OpenEdition Journals, Érudit, etc. ), digital libraries (Gallica from the BnF, Mazarinum from the bibliothèque Mazarine, bibliothèque Sainte-Geneviève, bibliothèque inter-universitaire de médecine, etc.), open archives (HAL-SHS, but also theses.fr, TEL, etc.) and a very large number of scientific databases produced in laboratories.

The latest version, extensively redesigned in 2018 with the help of teacher-researchers, offers a connected space forming a vast scientific network.

ISIDORE inspired several projects in the 2010 decade : in May 2019, TGIR Huma-Num and OpenEdition announced the European project TRIPLE which builds on Isidore philosophy and built on the same principles for OPERAS researchers. The Matilda portal follows in the footsteps of Isidore.

In May 2024, Huma-Num IR*, which is developing it, announced a program up to 2030 enabling the development of ISIDORE towards the inclusion of generative AI.

== Basic principles ==
ISIDORE harvests metadata and fulltext documents indexes them as digital data by enriching them with scientific terms and references (like thesaurus, taxonomies, etc.) in 3 languages: French, English and Spanish. It is edited as a web portal, isidore.science, an API and a SPARQL endpoint that allows access to enriched data in RDF. ISIDORE is available also like a WP plugin, called ISIDORE Suggestions.

ISIDORE is one of the digital platforms engaged in the sharing of scientific open data and promote FAIR Data.

It currently contains over 7M documents, from more 10000 collections and sources (digital libraries, journals, academic blogs, open archives, scientific databases, archives, etc.), making it the largest open digital library for humanities and social sciences research.

== How the portal works ==
Isidore harvests metadata according to three open metadata interoperability standards:

- OAI-PMH
- RDFa

Collected metadata is converted to RDF and enriched by IA and semantic processing with terms and vocabulary from scientific thesauri (specialized or general). The full-text documents linked to the metadata are indexed if they are freely accessible. Enhancements resulting from semantic processing are accessible both via the platform's website (search engine functionalities) and via its API to be used by software like Zotero.

== Sources ==
ISIDORE associates a large panel of scientific platforms and 'data producers': electronic edition platforms (Cairn.info, Persée, Revues.org, Erudit, etc.), digital libraries: (Gallica of the BnF, Mazarinum of the bibliothèque Mazarine, bibliothèque Sainte-Geneviève, bibliothèque inter-universitaire de médecine, etc.) open archives (HAL-SHS (Hyper Article en Ligne – Sciences de l'Homme et de la Société), theses.fr, Thèses en Ligne TEL, etc.) as well as a large number of other scientific databases maintained by French and foreign laboratories.
