= Gabriele Keller =

Computer scientist

Gabriele Cornelia Keller is a computer scientist whose research concerns type systems and data parallelism in functional programming. Educated in Germany, she has worked in Australia, the US, and the Netherlands, where she is Professor of Software Systems at Utrecht University.

== Education and career ==
Keller earned a degree in computer science from Technische Universität Berlin in 1995, and after working in the German software industry, completed a doctorate (Dr. Ing. at Technische Universität Berlin in 1999. Her dissertation, Transformation-based Implementation of Nested Data Parallelism for Distributed Memory Machines, was supervised by Stefan Jähnichen.

She became a lecturer at the University of Technology Sydney in Australia from 1999 to 2001, when she moved to the University of New South Wales. She was senior lecturer there from 2001 to 2013 (on leave in 2006 as a vice president at Credit Suisse in New York), and associate professor from 2014 to 2018. In 2018, she took her present position at Utrecht University, as Professor of Software Technology.

== Recognition ==
Keller's work with Manuel M. T. Chakravarty and Simon Peyton Jones developing a system for type families and type-level programming in Haskell won the Most Influential ICFP Paper Award of ACM SIGPLAN, ten years after its publication in 2005.

== Book ==
Keller is an author of the book An Introduction to Computing with Haskell (Pearson, 2002, with Manuel M. T. Chakravarty).
