= International Journal of Software Engineering and Knowledge Engineering =

- Discipline: Computer science
- Language: English
- Edited by: S-K Chang

Publication details
- History: 1991
- Publisher: World Scientific (Singapore)
- Impact factor: 1.007 (2021)

Standard abbreviations
- ISO 4: Int. J. Softw. Eng. Knowl. Eng.

Indexing
- ISSN: 0218-1940 (print); 1793-6403 (web)

Links
- Journal homepage

The International Journal of Software Engineering and Knowledge Engineering was founded in 1991 and is published by World Scientific, covering areas relating to software engineering and knowledge engineering and the connections between the two disciplines. Topics covered include object-oriented systems, rapid prototyping, logic programming, and software and knowledge-ware maintenance.

== Abstracting and indexing ==
The journal is abstracted and indexed in:

- SciSearch
- ISI Alerting Services
- CompuMath Citation Index
- Inspec
- io-port.net
- Compendex
- Computer Abstracts
