= Journal of Grid Computing =

- Discipline: Computer science
- Language: English
- Edited by: T. Kiss, A.Ullah

Publication details
- History: 2003–present
- Publisher: Springer Nature
- Frequency: Quarterly
- Open access: Hybrid
- Impact factor: 3.9 (2025)

Standard abbreviations
- ISO 4: J. Grid Comput.

Indexing
- CODEN: JGCOAP
- ISSN: 1570-7873 (print); 1572-9184 (web)
- LCCN: 2006204210
- OCLC no.: 639074886

Links
- Journal homepage

The Journal of Grid Computing is a quarterly peer-reviewed scientific journal published by Springer Nature. According to the Journal Citation Reports, the journal has a 2025 impact factor of 3.9. The editors-in-chief are Tamas Kiss (University of Westminster) and Amjad Ullah (Edinburgh Napier University).

== Scope ==
The Journal of Grid Computing covers research on technologies for collaborative work, information sharing and problem solving, and topics most commonly covered include protocols, middleware, services, security, discovery, sharing, and scaling.
