= Journal of Functional Programming =

- Discipline: Computer science
- Language: English
- Edited by: Derek Dreyer, Gabriele Keller

Publication details
- History: 1991–present
- Publisher: Episciences (United Kingdom)
- Frequency: Bimonthly
- Open access: diamond open access (from January 2026; was previously made author-pay open access in 2022)

Standard abbreviations
- ISO 4: J. Funct. Program.
- MathSciNet: J. Funct. Programming

Indexing
- ISSN: 0956-7968 (print); 1469-7653 (web)

Links
- Journal homepage; Online archive of pre-2026 articles

The Journal of Functional Programming is a peer-reviewed scientific journal covering the design, implementation, and application of functional programming languages, spanning the range from mathematical theory to industrial practice. Topics covered include functional languages and extensions, implementation techniques, reasoning and proof, program transformation and synthesis, type systems, type theory, language-based security, memory management, parallelism and applications. The journal is of interest to computer scientists, software engineers, programming language researchers, and mathematicians interested in the logical foundations of programming. Philip Wadler was editor-in-chief from 1990 to 2004. The journal is indexed in Zentralblatt MATH.

As of 2026, the journal is published as diamond open access: the journal articles are available online without a subscription, and there are no author-processing charges. This follows a change of publisher from Cambridge University Press to Episciences. All previous volumes of the journal published by Cambridge University Press were made freely available.

== See also ==
- International Conference on Functional Programming
- Higher-Order and Symbolic Computation
