= Hipertext.net =

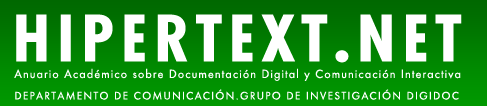
- Discipline: Library and information science and Interactive Communication
- Language: English, Spanish, catalan
- Edited by: Pere Freixa, Lluís Codina, Cristòfol Rovira

Publication details
- History: 2003-present
- Publisher: Pompeu Fabra University (Spain)
- Frequency: Biannual
- Open access: Yes

Standard abbreviations
- ISO 4: Hipertext.net

Indexing
- ISSN: 1695-5498

Links
- Journal homepage

Hipertext.net is a biannual open access Peer review academic journal covering all aspects of information, documentation and archives in the digital world and Interactive Communication. It is published by the Information Science Section of the Communication Department of the Pompeu Fabra University and was established in 2003 by Cristòfol Rovira, Lluís Codina, and Mari-Carmen Marcos (Pompeu Fabra University).

The scope of the journal is investigating the different connections among user experience and semantic web, including issues of library and information science: accessibility, management tools, on-line cultural resources, and websites museum, Science 2.0, cybermedia, Libraries 2.0, SEO, visibility, CMS, on-line media, the information architecture, taxonomy in Web sites, usability, web design, etc.

== See also ==
- Open access in Spain
