= FGC =

FGC may refer to:

- Family Group Conference
- Federal Government College (disambiguation)
- Female genital cutting
- Ferrocarrils de la Generalitat de Catalunya, a Spanish railway company
- FGC-9, a 3D printable firearm
- Fifth generation computer
- Fighting game community, a video gaming collective
- Florida Gateway College, in Lake City, Florida, United States
- Friends General Conference, a North American Quaker association
- Friends of Garrity Creek, in California, United States
- Fronte della Gioventù Comunista, a communist youth organization
