= Empirical Software Engineering =

- Discipline: Empirical software engineering
- Language: English
- Edited by: Robert Feldt and Thomas Zimmermann

Publication details
- History: 1996–present
- Publisher: Springer
- Impact factor: 3.762 (2021)

Standard abbreviations
- ISO 4: Empir. Softw. Eng.

Indexing
- ISSN: 1382-3256 (print); 1573-7616 (web)

Links
- Journal homepage; Online access

Empirical Software Engineering is a peer-reviewed scientific journal published by Springer Nature. It was established in 1996 and covers the area of empirical software engineering. The editors-in-chief are Robert Feldt and Thomas Zimmermann.

== Abstracting and indexing ==
The journal is abstracted and indexed in the Science Citation Index Expanded and Current Contents/Engineering, Computing & Technology. According to the Journal Citation Reports, the journal has a 2021 impact factor of 3.762.

== Past Editors in Chief ==
- Lionel Briand (University of Ottawa).
- Victor Basili (University of Maryland).
- Warren Harrison (Portland State University).

== See also ==
- List of computer science journals
- List of engineering journals and magazines
- IEEE Transactions on Software Engineering
