= Journal of Database Management =

- Discipline: Database management
- Language: English
- Edited by: Keng Siau

Publication details
- History: 1990–present
- Publisher: IGI Global (United States)
- Frequency: Quarterly
- Impact factor: 2.656 (2021)

Standard abbreviations
- ISO 4: J. Database Manag.

Indexing
- CODEN: JDAMEQ
- ISSN: 1063-8016 (print); 1533-8010 (web)
- LCCN: 95655008
- OCLC no.: 26139845

Links
- Journal homepage

The Journal of Database Management is a top-tier quarterly peer-reviewed academic journal. It was established in 1990 and is published by IGI Global. The editor-in-chief is Professor Keng SIAU (City University of Hong Kong). The scope of the journal is relatively broad.

== Abstracting and indexing ==
The journal is abstracted and indexed in:

- ABI/INFORM
- ACM Digital Library
- Compendex
- Current Contents/Engineering, Computing & Technology
- DBLP
- EBSCO databases
- Emerald Abstracts
- INSPEC
- Library and Information Science Abstracts
- Scopus
- Science Citation Index Expanded

According to the Journal Citation Reports, the journal has an impact factor of 2.656 in 2021. The journal is also an ABDC "A" journal.
