= Transactions on Aspect-Oriented Software Development =

Scientific journal

- Discipline: Computer science
- Language: English
- Edited by: Shmuel Katz, Mira Mezini

Publication details
- Publisher: Springer Science+Business Media

Standard abbreviations
- ISO 4: Trans. Asp.-Oriented Softw. Dev.

Indexing
- ISSN: 1864-3027 (print); 1864-3035 (web)

Links
- Journal homepage

Transactions on Aspect-Oriented Software Development is a peer-reviewed book series that covers aspect-oriented software development techniques in all phases of the software life cycle, from requirements and design to implementation, maintenance, and evolution. The editors-in-chief are Shmuel Katz (Technion – Israel Institute of Technology) and Mira Mezini (Technische Universität Darmstadt). The series is published by Springer Science+Business Media.
