= International Journal of Mobile and Blended Learning =

- Discipline: Educational technology
- Language: English
- Edited by: David Parsons

Publication details
- History: 2009-present
- Publisher: IGI Global, on behalf of the International Association for Mobile Learning (United States)
- Frequency: Quarterly

Standard abbreviations
- ISO 4: Int. J. Mob. Blended Learn.

Indexing
- ISSN: 1941-8647 (print); 1941-8655 (web)
- OCLC no.: 216884549

Links
- Journal homepage; Online archive

The International Journal of Mobile and Blended Learning is a quarterly peer-reviewed academic journal which focuses on educational technology, specifically on theoretical, technical, and pedagogical aspects of learning in mobile and blended environments. It is the official journal of the International Association for Mobile Learning and is published on their behalf by IGI Global. The journal was established in 2009 by David Parsons (Massey University), who remains the editor-in-chief. Annual collections of papers from the journal are published as a series of edited books.

== Abstracting and indexing ==
The journal is abstracted and indexed in:

- ACM Digital Library
- Inspec
- Compendex
- Emerging Sources Citation Index
- PsycINFO
- Scopus
