= International Journal of Innovation and Technology Management =

- Discipline: Engineering, Management, Business, Design, Innovation, Computer Science
- Language: English

Publication details
- Publisher: World Scientific (Singapore)

Standard abbreviations
- ISO 4: Int. J. Innov. Technol. Manag.

Indexing
- ISSN: 0219-8770 (print); 1793-6950 (web)

Links
- Journal homepage

The International Journal of Innovation and Technology Management was launched in 2004 and is published by World Scientific. It focuses on the "managerial issues and challenges brought about by the increasing pace of technological advancement globally". The current editor in chief is Jin Chen (Tsinghua University, China).

The main emphasis of the International Journal of Innovation and Technology Management is on the promotion and discussion of excellent research on technological innovation. As a platform for reporting, sharing, as well as exchanging ideas, IJITM encourages novel research findings, industry best practices, and reports on recent trends. In particular, the journal focuses on managerial issues and challenges (and ways to address them) motivated through the increasing pace of technological advancement globally. This international and interdisciplinary research dimension is emphasized in order to promote greater exchange between researchers of different disciplines as well as cultural and national backgrounds.

This double-blind peer-reviewed journal encompasses all facets of the process of technological innovation from idea generation, conceptualization of new products and processes, R&D activities, and commercial application. Research on all firm sizes, from entrepreneurial ventures, small and medium-sized enterprises (SMEs), as well as large organizations, is welcome.

== Abstracting and indexing ==
The journal is abstracted and indexed in the Scopus, Inspec, Emerging Sources Citation Index and Chartered Association of Business Schools' Academic Journal Guide (ABS).
