= Algorithmica =

- Discipline: Algorithms and Computer science
- Language: English
- Edited by: Mohammad T. Hajiaghayi

Publication details
- History: 1986–present
- Publisher: Springer Science+Business Media
- Frequency: Monthly
- Open access: Hybrid
- Impact factor: 0.791 (2020)

Standard abbreviations
- ISO 4: Algorithmica

Indexing
- CODEN: ALGOEJ
- ISSN: 0178-4617 (print); 1432-0541 (web)
- LCCN: 87647254
- OCLC no.: 39930181

Links
- Journal homepage; Online access

Algorithmica is a monthly peer-reviewed scientific journal focusing on research and the application of computer science algorithms. The journal was established in 1986 and is published by Springer Science+Business Media. The editor in chief is Mohammad Hajiaghayi. Subject coverage includes sorting, searching, data structures, computational geometry, and linear programming, VLSI, distributed computing, parallel processing, computer aided design, robotics, graphics, data base design, and software tools.

== Abstracting and indexing ==
This journal is indexed by the following services:

- Academic OneFile
- ACM Computing Reviews
- ACM Digital Library
- Current Contents / Engineering, Computing, and Technology
- DBLP
- EI - Compendex
- Journal Citation Reports / Science Edition
- Inspec
- io-port – FIZ Karlsruhe
- Mathematical Reviews
- Science Citation Index
- Scopus
- Index to Statistics
- INIS – Atomindex
- International Abstracts in Operations Research
- PASCAL
- Summon by Serial Solutions
- VINITI Database RAS
- Zentralblatt Math

== See also ==
- ACM Transactions on Algorithms
- Algorithms (journal)
- Discrete Mathematics & Theoretical Computer Science
