= International Journal of Data Warehousing and Mining =

- Discipline: Data warehousing; data mining
- Language: English
- Edited by: David Taniar

Publication details
- History: 2005–present
- Publisher: IGI Global (USA)
- Frequency: Quarterly

Standard abbreviations
- ISO 4: Int. J. Data Warehous. Min.

Indexing
- ISSN: 1548-3924 (print); 1548-3932 (web)

Links
- Journal homepage

The International Journal of Data Warehousing and Mining (IJDWM) is a quarterly peer-reviewed academic journal covering data warehousing and data mining. It was established in 2005 and is published by IGI Global. The editor-in-chief is David Taniar (Monash University, Australia).

== Abstracting and indexing ==
The journal is abstracted and indexed in:

- ACM Digital Library
- Compendex (Elsevier Engineering Index)
- DBLP
- INSPEC (IET)
- SCOPUS
- Web of Science (All Journals)
- Web of Science Science Citation Index Expanded (SCIE)
