= Internet Histories =

- Discipline: Computer science
- Language: English

Publication details
- Publisher: Routledge
- Frequency: Quarterly

Standard abbreviations
- ISO 4: Internet Hist.

Indexing
- ISSN: 2470-1475 (print); 2470-1483 (web)

Internet Histories is an academic journal of the history of the internet. It is indexed in Scopus.
