= Consortium for Computing Sciences in Colleges =

US nonprofit organization

Consortium for Computing Sciences in Colleges (CCSC)
- Founded: 1986
- Founders: Will Mitchell; Wally Roth; Christine Shannon
- Type: Nonprofit organization (IRS exemption status): 501(c)(3)
- Purpose: Computer Science Education
- Website: www.ccsc.org

The Consortium for Computing Sciences in Colleges (CCSC) is a nonprofit organization divided into ten regions that roughly match geographical areas in the United States. The purpose of the consortium is to: "promote, support and improve computing curricula in colleges and universities; encompass regional constituencies devoted to this purpose; and promote a national liaison among local, regional and national organizations devoted to this purpose." Predominantly these colleges and universities are oriented toward teaching, rather than research.

== Regions ==
CCSC regions include:

1. Central Plains
2. Eastern
3. Midsouth
4. Midwest
5. Northeastern
6. Northwestern
7. Rocky Mountain
8. South Central
9. Southeastern
10. Southwestern

== Conferences ==
Conferences are typically held annually by region, and include presentation of peer-reviewed papers, as well as student papers, posters, and programming contests, workshops, and special sessions for innovative assignments and approaches in the area of computer science technology and education.

== Journal ==
CCSC publishes the Journal of Computing Sciences in Colleges, containing the proceedings of each annual regional conference. The journal is distributed to approximately 600 faculty members from 350 colleges and universities.

== See also ==
- Association for Computing Machinery (ACM)
- ACM Special Interest Group on Computer Science Education (SIGCSE)
- Computer science
- Google for Education
- National Center for Women & Information Technology
- Upsilon Pi Epsilon
