= International Journal of Modelling and Simulation =

- Discipline: Computer science
- Language: English
- Edited by: Jie Shen

Publication details
- History: 1981–present
- Publisher: Taylor & Francis
- Frequency: Bimonthly

Standard abbreviations
- ISO 4: Int. J. Model. Simul.

Indexing
- CODEN: IMSIEK
- ISSN: 0228-6203 (print); 1925-7082 (web)
- LCCN: 83642220
- OCLC no.: 77079238

Links
- Journal homepage; Online access; Online archive

The International Journal of Modelling and Simulation is a leading peer-reviewed scientific journal covering the fields of modeling and simulation. The editor-in-chief is Jie Shen (University of Michigan–Dearborn). The journal was established in 1981 and is published by Taylor & Francis.

== Abstracting and indexing ==
The journal is abstracted and indexed by ESCI, CSA Illumina, EI/Compendex, and Inspec.
