= Computing (journal) =

- Discipline: Computer science
- Language: English

Publication details
- Publisher: Springer Science+Business Media

Standard abbreviations
- ISO 4: Computing

Indexing
- ISSN: 0010-485X (print); 1436-5057 (web)

Links
- Journal homepage

Computing, subtitled Archives for Scientific Computing, is a scientific journal published by Springer Science+Business Media, which publishes research in computer science and numerical computation. As of 2008, the editors of the journal are Hermann Brunner, Rainer Burkard, Craig Douglas, Wolfgang Hackbusch, and Dietmar Saupe. The journal was established in 1966.
