= First Monday (journal) =

Monthly peer-reviewed open access academic journal

- Discipline: Computer science; Internet studies
- Language: English
- Edited by: Edward J. Valauskas

Publication details
- History: 1996–2026
- Publisher: First Monday Editorial Group (United States)
- Frequency: Monthly
- Open access: Yes

Standard abbreviations
- ISO 4: First Monday

Indexing
- ISSN: 1396-0466 (print); 1396-0458 (web)
- LCCN: sn97036844
- OCLC no.: 36875243

Links
- Journal homepage

First Monday was a monthly peer-reviewed open access academic journal covering research on the Internet, published in the United States.

The May 2026 issue of First Monday marked the thirtieth anniversary of the journal. The journal ceased publication, after 30 years, with that May 2026 issue. Altogether, 2,482 papers appeared in 360 issues, written by 3,703 different authors. First Monday has been archived in a variety of locations, notably at the Library of Congress, University of Illinois at Chicago, and elsewhere.

== Publication ==
The journal was sponsored and hosted by the University of Illinois at Chicago. It was published on the first Monday of every month. In 2011, the journal had an acceptance rate of about 15%.

The journal had no article processing charges and no advertisements.

== History ==
According to the chief editor, Edward Valauskas, the journal emerged before the open access model emerged:

"We didn't call it open access in 1995 but we were certainly a precursor to the whole notion of open access. We felt very strongly that the journal should have all its content made freely available and we insisted with [the Danish publisher] Munksgaard that the scholars who contributed would retain copyright of their work that they published in the journal. We felt it would encourage scholars to contribute and then re-use their content in lots of different ways".

First Monday was among the first peer-reviewed journals on the Internet. It originated in the summer of 1995 with a proposal to start a new Internet-only, peer-reviewed journal about the Internet by eventual editor-in-chief Edward J. Valauskas to Munksgaard, a Danish publisher. Munksgaard agreed to publish the journal in September 1995. The first issue appeared on 6 May 1996, the first Monday of May, also the opening of the Fifth International World Wide Web Conference in Paris. The first issue was distributed at that conference on diskette as well as released on the Internet from a server in Copenhagen at the address www.firstmonday.dk.

In December 1998, Munksgaard sold the journal to three of the editors: Edward J. Valauskas, Esther Dyson, and Rishab Aiyer Ghosh. The server was moved from Copenhagen to the University of Illinois at Chicago's Library. The first issue based on a server in Chicago appeared 4 January 1999.

=== Conferences ===
The first First Monday conference took place 4–6 November 2001 in Maastricht at the International Institute of Infonomics. To celebrate First Monday's 10th birthday in 2006, a conference took place at the University of Illinois at Chicago, 15–17 May 2006. The theme of the conference was Openness: Code, science and content. In excess of 200 participants from more than 30 countries took part in the meeting. Papers from the Conference were published in the June and July issues. The conference was sponsored by The Open Society Institute, The John D. and Catherine T. MacArthur Foundation, The University of Illinois at Chicago and the University of Maastricht.

In 2017 it was removed from the Directory of Open Access Journals. In 2026 it announced that the May 2026 issue would be the last.
