= Journal of Interconnection Networks =

- Discipline: Computer Science
- Language: English
- Edited by: C. T. Howard Ho

Publication details
- History: 2000-present
- Publisher: World Scientific (Singapore)

Standard abbreviations
- ISO 4: J. Interconnect. Netw.

Indexing
- ISSN: 0219-2659 (print); 1793-6713 (web)

Links
- Journal homepage

The Journal of Interconnection Networks was established in 2000 and is published by World Scientific. It covers the field of interconnection networks from theory and analysis to design and implementation, as well as corresponding issues of communication, computing and function. This includes topics structures and functions in biological systems and neural networks.

== Abstracting and indexing ==
The journal is abstracted and indexed in Inspec, DBLP Bibliography Server, and io-port.net.
