= Cluster Computing (journal) =

- Discipline: Computer clustering
- Language: English
- Edited by: Salim Hariri

Publication details
- History: 1998 to present
- Publisher: Springer Science+Business Media (USA)
- Impact factor: 1.809 (2020)

Standard abbreviations
- ISO 4: Clust. Comput.

Indexing
- ISSN: 1386-7857

Links
- Journal homepage

Cluster Computing: the Journal of Networks, Software Tools and Applications is a peer-reviewed scientific journal on parallel processing, distributed computing systems, and computer communication networks. The journal was established in 1998.

According to the Journal Citation Reports, the journal had a 2020 impact factor of 1.809. The editor-in-chief is Salim Hariri (University of Arizona).
