= Data Technologies and Applications =

- Discipline: Information systems
- Language: English
- Edited by: Miguel-Angel Sicilia

Publication details
- Former names: Program: Electronic Library and Information Systems
- History: 1966–present
- Publisher: Emerald Group Publishing (UK)
- Frequency: Quarterly
- Open access: Hybrid
- Impact factor: 0.556 (2016)

Standard abbreviations
- ISO 4: Data Technol. Appl.

Indexing
- ISSN: 2514-9288

Links
- Journal homepage

Data Technologies and Applications (DTA) is a peer-reviewed academic, interdisciplinary journal concerning any topic related to web science, data analytics and digital information management. It is published quarterly by Emerald Group Publishing Limited.

The journal was previously called Program: Electronic Library and Information Systems but in 2018 the name changed to Data Technologies and Applications.

According to the Journal Citation Reports, the journal has a 2016 impact factor of 0.556.
