= Future Generation Computer Systems =

- Discipline: computer science
- Language: English
- Edited by: Michela Taufer

Publication details
- History: 1984-present
- Publisher: Elsevier
- Frequency: Monthly
- Open access: Yes
- Impact factor: 7.187 (2019)

Standard abbreviations
- ISO 4: Future Gener. Comput. Syst.

Indexing
- ISSN: 0167-739X
- OCLC no.: 640839886

Links
- Journal homepage

Future Generation Computer Systems is a monthly peer-reviewed scientific journal covering all aspects of computer engineering. It is published by Elsevier and the editor-in-chief is Michela Taufer (University of Tennessee). According to the Journal Citation Reports, the journal had a 2019 impact factor of 7.187.
