= Logical Methods in Computer Science =

- Discipline: Theoretical computer science
- Language: English
- Edited by: Stefan Milius

Publication details
- History: 2005–present
- Publisher: Logical Methods in Computer Science e.V.
- Frequency: Quarterly
- Open access: Yes
- License: Creative Commons BY 4.0 (from around 2018), Creative Commons BY-ND (until around 2017)
- Impact factor: 0.661 (2016)

Standard abbreviations
- ISO 4: Log. Methods Comput. Sci.

Indexing
- ISSN: 1860-5974
- OCLC no.: 897996717

Links
- Journal homepage; Online archive

Logical Methods in Computer Science (LMCS) is a peer-reviewed open access scientific journal covering theoretical computer science and applied logic. It opened to submissions on September 1, 2004. The editor-in-chief is Stefan Milius (Friedrich-Alexander Universität Erlangen-Nürnberg).

== History ==
The journal was initially published by the International Federation for Computational Logic, and then by a dedicated non-profit. It moved to the Episciences platform in 2017. The first editor-in-chief was Dana Scott. In its first year, the journal received 75 submissions.

== Abstracting and indexing ==
The journal is abstracted and indexed in Current Contents/Engineering, Computing & Technology, Mathematical Reviews, Science Citation Index Expanded, Scopus, and Zentralblatt MATH. According to the Journal Citation Reports, the journal has a 2016 impact factor of 0.661.
