= Algorithms (journal) =

- Discipline: Algorithms
- Language: English
- Edited by: Frank Werner

Publication details
- History: 2008–present
- Publisher: MDPI
- Frequency: Monthly
- Open access: Yes
- Impact factor: 2.3 (2022)

Standard abbreviations
- ISO 4: Algorithms
- MathSciNet: Algorithms (Basel)

Indexing
- CODEN: ALGOCH
- ISSN: 1999-4893
- OCLC no.: 405716627

Links
- Journal homepage

Algorithms is a monthly peer-reviewed open-access scientific journal of mathematics, covering design, analysis, and experiments on algorithms. The journal is published by MDPI and was established in 2008. The founding editor-in-chief was Kazuo Iwama (Kyoto University). From May 2014 to September 2019, the editor-in-chief was Henning Fernau (Universität Trier). The current editor-in-chief is Frank Werner (Otto-von-Guericke-Universität Magdeburg).

== Abstracting and indexing ==
According to the Journal Citation Reports, the journal has a 2022 impact factor of 2.3. The journal is abstracted and indexed in:

- Chemical Abstracts Service
- Ei Compendex
- Emerging Sources Citation Index
- Inspec
- MathSciNet
- Scopus
- zbMATH Open (2008–2019).

== See also ==
Journals with similar scope include:

- ACM Transactions on Algorithms
- Algorithmica
- Journal of Algorithms (Elsevier)
