= Parallel Processing Letters =

- Discipline: Computer science
- Language: English
- Edited by: Andrew Adamatzky

Publication details
- History: 1991–present
- Publisher: World Scientific (Singapore)
- Open access: Hybrid

Standard abbreviations
- ISO 4: Parallel Process. Lett.

Indexing
- ISSN: 0129-6264 (print); 1793-642X (web)

Links
- Journal homepage

Parallel Processing Letters is a journal published by World Scientific since 1991. It covers the field of parallel processing, including topics such as design and analysis of parallel and distributed algorithms, parallel programming languages and parallel architectures and VLSI circuits.

== Scope ==
Parallel Processing Letters publishes short papers in the field of parallel processing. This journal has a wide scope and topics covered include:

- theory of parallel computation
- parallel programming languages
- parallel architectures and VLSI circuits
- unconventional computational problems (e.g., time-varying variables, interacting variables, time-varying complexity)
- unconventional computational paradigms (e.g., biomolecular computing, chemical computing, quantum computing)
- parallel programming environments
- design and analysis of parallel and distributed algorithms

== Abstracting and indexing ==
The journal is abstracted and indexed in:

- Inspec
- DBLP Bibliography Server
- Mathematical Reviews
- io-port.net
- Compendex
- Scopus
- CrossRef
- Google Scholar
