= International Journal of Applied Mathematics and Computer Science =

- Discipline: Applied mathematics, computer science
- Language: English
- Edited by: Józef Korbicz

Publication details
- Former names: Applied Mathematics and Computer Science
- History: 1991–present
- Publisher: University of Zielona Góra (Poland)
- Frequency: Quarterly
- Open access: Yes
- License: 1.2
- Impact factor: (2024)

Standard abbreviations
- ISO 4: Int. J. Appl. Math. Comput. Sci.

Indexing
- ISSN: 1641-876X (print); 2083-8492 (web)
- LCCN: 2004222855
- OCLC no.: 54678624

Links
- Journal homepage; Online archive

The International Journal of Applied Mathematics and Computer Science is a quarterly peer-reviewed scientific journal published since 1991 by the University of Zielona Góra in partnership with De Gruyter Poland and historically with Lubuskie Scientific Society, under the auspices of the Committee on Automatic Control and Robotics of the Polish Academy of Sciences. The editor-in-chief is Józef Korbicz (University of Zielona Góra). The journal covers various fields related to control theory, applied mathematics, scientific computing, and computer science.

== Abstracting and indexing ==
The journal is abstracted and indexed, among numerous others, in:

- Directory of Open Access Journals
- Ei Compendex
- EBSCO databases
- Inspec
- MathSciNet
- ProQuest databases
- Science Citation Index Expanded
- Scopus
- VINITI Database RAS
- zbMATH Open

According to the Journal Citation Reports, the journal has a 2024 impact factor of 1.2.
