= Discrete Mathematics & Theoretical Computer Science =

Peer-reviewed open access journal

- Discipline: Mathematics, computer science
- Language: English
- Edited by: Dieter Rautenbach, Sergi Elizalde and Hadas Shachnai

Publication details
- History: 1997–present
- Frequency: Quarterly
- Open access: Yes
- Impact factor: 0.465 (2011)

Standard abbreviations
- ISO 4: Discrete Math. Theor. Comput. Sci.

Indexing
- CODEN: DTCSFX
- ISSN: 1462-7264 (print); 1365-8050 (web)
- LCCN: 98641679
- OCLC no.: 300813040

Links
- Journal homepage; Online access; Online archive

Discrete Mathematics & Theoretical Computer Science is a peer-reviewed open access scientific journal covering discrete mathematics and theoretical computer science. It was established in 1997 by Daniel Krob (Paris Diderot University). Between 2001 and 2023, the editor-in-chief was Jens Gustedt (Institut National de Recherche en Informatique et en Automatique). The current editors-in-chief are Dieter Rautenbach, Sergi Elizalde and Hadas Shachnai.

Since 2016 the journal is published using the Episciences platform, switching from using the Open Journal System. While all articles were moved to the new platform, an archived copy of the old platform remained online for some time, but appears inaccessible as of 2026.

== Abstracting and indexing ==
The journal is abstracted and indexed in Mathematical Reviews and the Science Citation Index Expanded. According to the Journal Citation Reports, the journal has a 2011 impact factor of 0.465.
