= ACM Transactions on Algorithms =

- Discipline: Algorithms
- Language: English
- Edited by: Edith Cohen

Publication details
- History: 2005–present
- Publisher: Association for Computing Machinery
- Frequency: Quarterly
- Open access: no
- Impact factor: 0.9 (2023)

Standard abbreviations
- ISO 4: ACM Trans. Algorithms

Indexing
- ISSN: 1549-6325 (print); 1549-6333 (web)
- LCCN: 2004212232
- OCLC no.: 723357572

Links
- Journal homepage; Online access; Online archive

ACM Transactions on Algorithms (TALG) is a quarterly peer-reviewed scientific journal covering the field of algorithms. It was established in 2005 and is published by the Association for Computing Machinery. The editor-in-chief is Edith Cohen. The journal was created when the editorial board of the Journal of Algorithms resigned out of protest to the pricing policies of the publisher, Elsevier. Apart from regular submissions, the journal also invites selected papers from the ACM-SIAM Symposium on Discrete Algorithms (SODA).

== Abstracting and indexing ==
The journal is abstracted and indexed in the Science Citation Index Expanded, Current Contents/Engineering, Computing & Technology, and Scopus. According to the Journal Citation Reports, the journal has a 2023 impact factor of 0.9.

== Past editors ==
The following persons have been editors-in-chief of the journal:

- Harold N. Gabow (2005–2008)
- Susanne Albers (2008–2014)
- Aravind Srinivasan (2014–2021)

== See also ==
- Algorithmica
- Algorithms (journal)
