= Simulation & Gaming =

- Discipline: Computer simulation, gaming
- Language: English
- Edited by: Toshiko Kikkawa, Marlies P. Schijven

Publication details
- History: 1970-present
- Publisher: SAGE Publications
- Frequency: Bimonthly

Standard abbreviations
- ISO 4: Simul. Gaming

Indexing
- ISSN: 1046-8781 (print); 1552-826X (web)
- LCCN: 90640929
- OCLC no.: 41552194

Links
- Journal homepage; Online access; Online archive

Simulation and Gaming: An Interdisciplinary Journal of Theory, Practice and Research, is a bimonthly peer-reviewed scientific journal that covers the field of computer simulation and gaming, including virtual reality, serious games and educational games. The editors-in-chief are Toshiko Kikkawa and Marlies P. Schijven. It was established in 1970 and is published by SAGE Publications.

== Abstracting and indexing ==
The journal is abstracted and indexed in:

- Academic Search
- EBSCO databases
- ERIC
- Inspec
- PsycINFO
- Scopus
