= Fundamenta Informaticae =

Theoretical computer science journal

- Discipline: Computer science
- Language: English
- Edited by: Bartek Klin

Publication details
- History: 1977–present
- Publisher: Polish Mathematical Society, IOS Press (Poland)
- Frequency: 5/year
- Open access: yes
- Impact factor: 1.298 (2019)

Standard abbreviations
- ISO 4: Fundam. Inform.
- MathSciNet: Fund. Inform.

Indexing
- CODEN: FUMAAJ
- ISSN: 0169-2968 (print); 1875-8681 (web)
- LCCN: 79641689
- OCLC no.: 60628486

Links
- Journal homepage; Journal page at publisher's website; Online archive

Fundamenta Informaticae is a peer-reviewed scientific journal covering theoretical computer science. The editor-in-chief is Bartek Klin. It was established in 1977 by the Polish Mathematical Society as Series IV of the Annales Societatis Mathematicae Polonae, with its main focus on theoretical foundations of computer science. The journal is currently hosted on the Episciences.org platform of the Center for direct scientific communication, and published by IOS Press under the auspices of the European Association for Theoretical Computer Science.
