= DBLP =

Computer science bibliography website

dblp computer science bibliography
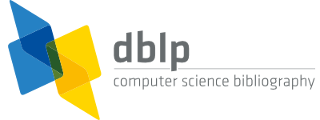
- dblp's logo since 2012
- Website type: Online database
- Owner: Schloss Dagstuhl – Leibniz-Zentrum für Informatik (LZI)
- Creator: Michael Ley
- Editor: Leibniz Center for Informatics
- Website: dblp.org
- Commercial: No
- Registration: None
- Launched: 1993

DBLP is a computer science bibliography website. Starting in 1993 at Universität Trier in Germany, it grew from a small collection of HTML files and became an organization hosting a database and logic programming bibliography site. Since November 2018, DBLP is a branch of Schloss Dagstuhl – Leibniz-Zentrum für Informatik (LZI). DBLP listed more than 5.4 million journal articles, conference papers, and other publications on computer science in December 2020, up from about 14,000 in 1995 and 3.66 million in July 2016. All important journals on computer science are tracked. Proceedings papers of many conferences are also tracked. It is mirrored at three sites across the Internet.

For his work on maintaining DBLP, Michael Ley received an award from the Association for Computing Machinery (ACM) and the VLDB Endowment Special Recognition Award in 1997. Furthermore, he was awarded the ACM Distinguished Service Award for "creating, developing, and curating DBLP" in 2019.

DBLP originally stood for DataBase systems & Logic Programming. As a backronym, it has been taken to stand for Digital Bibliography & Library Project; however, it is now preferred that the acronym be simply a name, hence the new title "The DBLP Computer Science Bibliography".

== DBL-Browser ==
DBL-Browser
- Developer: Alexander Weber
- Release: 2005; 21 years ago
- Stable release: 2.0b / September 6, 2006; 20 years ago
- Written in: Java
- Operating system: Unix
- Type: XML
- License: GPL
- Website: dbis.uni-trier.de/DBL-Browser (offline)

DBL-Browser (Digital Bibliographic Library Browser) is a utility for browsing the DBLP website. The browser was written by Alexander Weber in 2005 at the University of Trier. It was designed for use off-line in reading the DBLP, which consisted of 696,000 bibliographic entries in 2005 (and in 2015 has more than 2.9 million).

DBL-Browser is GPL software, available for download from SourceForge. It uses the XML DTD. Written in the Java programming language, this application has several views for bibliographic data:

- Author page
- Article page
- Table of contents
- Related conferences / journals
- Related authors (graphic representation of relationships)
- Trend analysis (graphics histogram)

DBLP is similar to the bibliographic portion of arxiv.org which also links to articles. DBL-Browser provides a means to view some of the associated computer science articles.

== See also ==
- List of academic databases and search engines
- Association for Computational Linguistics
- CiteSeerX
- CogPrints
- Google Scholar
- Live Search Academic
- The Collection of Computer Science Bibliographies
- Dagstuhl
