= List of artificial intelligence journals =

List of academic journals in artificial intelligence

The following is a list of artificial intelligence journals, including notable peer-reviewed academic journals that publish research in artificial intelligence (AI) and related fields such as machine learning, computer vision, natural language processing, computational intelligence, automated reasoning, robotics, and intelligent systems.

== General artificial intelligence ==
- Applied Artificial Intelligence
- Artificial Intelligence
- Expert Systems with Applications
- IEEE Intelligent Systems
- International Journal on Artificial Intelligence Tools
- Journal of Artificial Intelligence Research (JAIR)
- Journal of Experimental and Theoretical Artificial Intelligence
- Knowledge-Based Systems

== Machine learning and neural computation ==
- Cognitive Computation
- Data Mining and Knowledge Discovery
- IEEE Transactions on Neural Networks and Learning Systems
- Journal of Machine Learning Research
- Machine Learning
- Nature Machine Intelligence
- Neural Computation
- Neural Networks
- Neurocomputing

== Computational intelligence and automated reasoning ==
- Computational Intelligence
- Evolutionary Computation
- Fuzzy Sets and Systems
- IEEE Transactions on Evolutionary Computation
- IEEE Transactions on Fuzzy Systems
- International Journal of Approximate Reasoning
- Journal of Automated Reasoning

== Computer vision and pattern recognition ==
- Electronic Letters on Computer Vision and Image Analysis
- Foundations and Trends in Computer Graphics and Vision
- IEEE Transactions on Pattern Analysis and Machine Intelligence
- International Journal of Computer Vision
- International Journal of Pattern Recognition and Artificial Intelligence
- Machine Vision and Applications
- Pattern Recognition

== Natural language processing ==
- Computational Linguistics
- Natural Language Processing
- Transactions of the Association for Computational Linguistics

== Robotics and intelligent systems ==
- Adaptive Behavior
- Annual Review of Control, Robotics, and Autonomous Systems
- IEEE Transactions on Robotics
- International Journal of Humanoid Robotics
- The International Journal of Robotics Research
- Journal of Intelligent and Robotic Systems
- Science Robotics

== Interdisciplinary and ethics in AI ==
- AI & Society
- Artificial Life
- Journal of Artificial Intelligence and Consciousness
- Minds and Machines
- Philosophy & Technology

== See also ==
- Association for the Advancement of Artificial Intelligence
- List of artificial intelligence algorithms
- List of artificial intelligence books
- List of artificial intelligence projects
- List of computer science journals
- List of information systems journals
- List of large language models
- List of software programming journals
- Lists of academic journals
- Lists of open-source artificial intelligence software

=== Artificial intelligence conferences ===
- AAAI Conference on Artificial Intelligence
- AI Action Summit
- Conference on Computer Vision and Pattern Recognition
- Conference on Neural Information Processing Systems
- European Conference on Artificial Intelligence
- International Conference on Autonomous Agents and Multiagent Systems
- International Conference on Learning Representations
- International Conference on Machine Learning
- International Joint Conference on Artificial Intelligence
- Nvidia GTC
