= List of robotics journals =

List of academic journals in robotics

List of robotics journals includes notable academic and scientific journals that focus on research in the field of robotics and automation.

== Journals ==
- Acta Mechanica et Automatica
- Adaptive Behavior
- Advanced Intelligent Systems
- Advanced Robotics
- Annual Review of Control, Robotics, and Autonomous Systems
- Bioinspiration & Biomimetics
- Foundations and Trends in Computer Graphics and Vision
- IEEE Robotics and Automation Letters
- IEEE Transactions on Robotics
- IEEE Transactions on Field Robotics
- The International Journal of Advanced Manufacturing Technology
- International Journal of Humanoid Robotics
- International Journal of Robotics Research
- Journal of Cognitive Engineering and Decision Making
- Journal of Field Robotics
- Journal of Intelligent and Robotic Systems
- Paladyn
- Robotics and Autonomous Systems
- Robotics
- Science Robotics
- SLAS Technology

== See also ==
- List of computer science journals
- List of artificial intelligence journals
- List of engineering journals and magazines
- List of roboticists
- List of robotics companies
- List of robotics occupations
- List of robotics software
- List of open-source artificial intelligence software for robotics
- Physical artificial intelligence
- Robotics
- Automation

=== Robotics conferences and events ===
- DARPA Robotics Challenge
- Defcon Robot Contest
- FIRST Championship
- Humanoids Summit
- International Conference on Human–Robot Interaction
- International Conference on Intelligent Robots and Systems
- International Conference on Robotics and Automation
- International Robot Exhibition
- RoboCup
- Roboexotica
- RoboGames
