= Moshe Shoham =

Israeli robotics professor

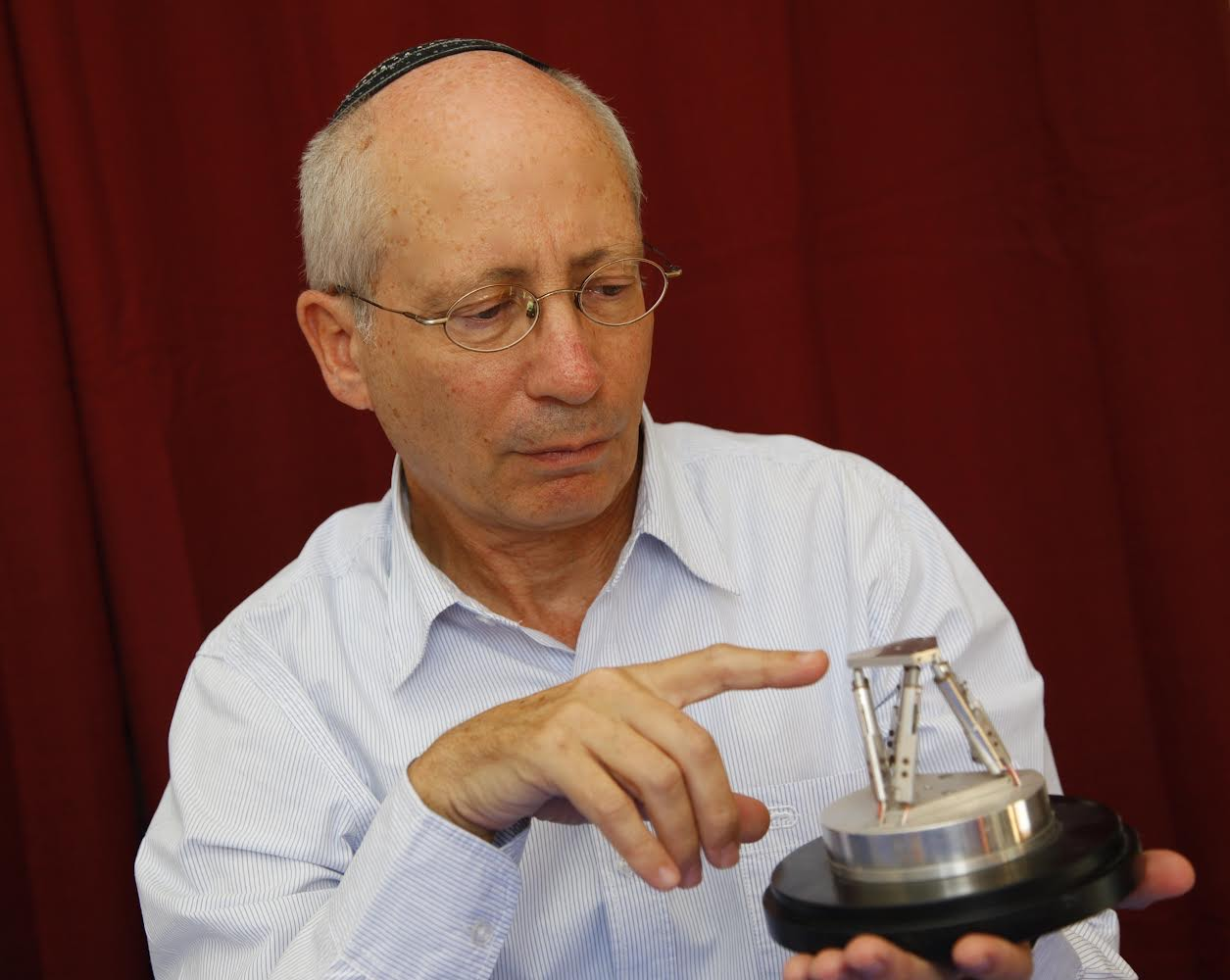
- Born: 1952 (age 73–74); Haifa, Israel
- Education: Technion
- Awards: Member of the National Academy of Engineering; Fellow of the American Society of Mechanical Engineers (ASME); IEEE Fellow; Thomas A. Edison Patent Award
- Scientific career
- Fields: Medical Robotics
- Workplaces: Technion
- Thesis: End-Effector Guidance of Robotic Arms (1986)
- Doctoral advisor: Yoram Koren

Moshe Shoham (born: 1952; Hebrew: משה שהם) is a professor emeritus in the faculty of mechanical engineering at the Technion - Israel Institute of Technology.

Shoham’s research work focuses on kinematics and dynamics of robots and medical robotics. He is a founder and co-founder of several companies in these fields, including Mazor Robotics and Microbot Medical.

Shoham is a fellow of IEEE and ASME and an International Member of the US National Academy of Engineering “For contributions to robotic technology for image-guided surgery.”

== Early life and education ==
Moshe Shoham was born in Haifa, Israel and studied at Yavneh high-school. After serving in the IDF’s Golani brigade, he started studying Aeronautical Engineering at the Technion and earned a B.sc. in 1978. He then worked for two years in Israel Aerospace Industries (IAI) as an aeronautical engineer. Shoham continued his studies at the Technion in 1980. He received his M.Sc. in mechanical engineering in 1982 and his D.Sc. in 1986. He authored the thesis “End-Effector Guidance of Robotic Arms” under Yoram Koren’s supervision.

== Academic career ==
Shoham joined Columbia University, New York as assistant professor in the department of mechanical engineering in 1986.

In 1990 he returned to the faculty of mechanical engineering at the Technion as a senior lecturer and headed the robotics laboratory. He was promoted to associate professor in 1997, and to full professor in 2004. A year later he was endowed the Tamara and Harry Handelsman Academic Chair at the faculty. Shoham is also the head of the Leumi Robotics Center, which was founded in 2009 at the faculty. Shoham retired in 2020 as an emeritus professor.

During his career, Shoham was a visiting professor at the departments of mechanical engineering of Stanford University, California, City University of Hong-Kong and Columbia University, New York.

Shoham has supervised 45 graduate students.

== Industrial career ==
Shoham founded, together with Eli Zehavi, Mazor Robotics (Nasdaq: MZOR) in 2001. The company develops and manufactures a robotic guidance system for spine surgery, and was acquired by Medtronic in 2018 in a $1.64 billion deal, the largest biotech acquisition in Israel.

In 2011 he co-founded Microbot Medical (Nasdaq: MBOT) which develops micro-robotics for surgical procedures, and in 2017 he co-founded Diagnostic Robotics. The company uses AI and predictive analytics to cut healthcare costs.

In 2017 Shoham founded Tamar Robotics, which develops an endoscopic surgical robotic system for “small cavity” procedures. In 2020 he co-founded Forsight Robotics, which develops robots for ophthalmic surgery.

== Research ==
Shoham’s research work focuses on medical robotics and robotic systems. These include kinematics and dynamics of robots, sensor-based robots and multi-fingered hands.

He elaborated on the theory of dual numbers, the use of which reduces the number of rigid body equations of motion from six real to three dual ones. Also, he developed new structures of parallel robots and analyzed the singularities of these mechanisms.

== Publications ==
Shoham has authored 3 books and some 200 articles. He also holds more than 50 patents.

=== Books ===
- Moshe Shoham: A Textbook of Robotics 1: Basic Concepts. First published by Eshed Robotec, Tel-Aviv, Israel, 1984.
- Moshe Shoham: A Textbook of Robotics 2: Structure, Control and Operation. First published by Eshed Robotec, Tel-Aviv, Israel, 1984. Second publication by Kogan Page Ltd., London, Great Britain, 1986. (also translated to 3 languages)
- Bamberger, H., Wolf, A., Shoham, M.: Kinematics of Micro Parallel Robots: Research on MEMS Kinematics, VDM Verlag, 2009.

=== Selected articles ===
- Brodsky, V., Shoham, M.: "Dual-Numbers representation of Rigid Body Dynamics," Journal of Mechanisms and Machine Theory, Vol. 34, No. 5, pp. 693-718, 1999.
- Shoham, M., et al. “Bone-Mounted Miniature Robot for Surgical Procedures: Concept and Clinical Applications,” IEEE Transactions on Robotics and Automation, Vol. 19, No. 5, pp. 893-901, 2003.
- Wolf, A., Shoham, M.: “Investigation of Parallel Manipulators using Linear Complex Approximation,” ASME, Journal of Mechanical Design, Vol. 125, No, 3, pp. 564-572, 2003.
- Shoham, M., et al. :"Robotic Assisted Spinal Surgery - From Concept to Clinical Practice," Journal of Computer Aided Surgery, Vol. 12, No. 2, pp. 105-115, 2007.
- Glozman, D., Shoham, M.: "Image-guided Robotic Flexible Needle Steering," IEEE Transactions on Robotics, Vol. 23, No. 3, pp. 459-467, 2007.
- Ben-Horin, P., Shoham, M. :"Application of Grassmann-Cayley algebra to geometrical interpretation of parallel robot singularities," The International Journal of Robotics Research, Vol, 28, No. 1, pp. 127-141, 2009.
- Cohen, A., Shoham, M.:”Principle of Transference – An Extension to Hyper-Dual Numbers,” Mechanism and Machine Theory, Vol. 125, pp. 101-110, 2017.
- Zarrouk, D., Sharf, I., Shoham, M.:”Energetic Analysis and Experiments of Earthworm-Like Locomotion With Compliant Surfaces,” Bioinspiration & Biomimetics, No. 11, 2016.
- Cohen, A., Shoham, M.:”Application of hyper-dual numbers to rigid bodies equations of motion,” Mechanism and Machine Theory, Vol. 111, pp. 76-84, 2017.
- David, O., Shoham, M.:”Optimal synthesis of parallel robots' actuators stiffness for given combinations of twist and wrench sets,” Mechanism and Machine Theory, 2019.
- David, O., Shoham, M.:”Compliant Mechanism as a Motion-Preserving Artificial Spinal Disc: a Novel Concept,” ASME, Journal of Engineering and Science in Medical Diagnostics and Therapy, 2019.
- Cohen, A., Shoham, M.:”Hyper Dual Quaternions representation of rigid bodies kinematics,” Mechanism and Machine Theory, Vol. 150, 2020.

== Honors and awards ==
- Igal Alon award for Highly Worthy Action in Social and Pioneering, and Lifetime Achievement in Innovation and Industry, 2021
- Honorary membership - Israel Society for Medical and Biological Engineering, 2020
- The Maurice E. Müller Award for Excellence in Computer Assisted Surgery, 2019
- Israel Post issued “Robotic Guidance of Spine Surgery Stamp” to mark Mazor Robotics’ robots for spine surgery, which were founded based on technology developed by Prof. Shoham, 2018
- Fellow – Institute of Electrical and Electronics Engineers (IEEE) “For contributions to robot manipulators and miniature medical robots”, 2015
- International Member – US National Academy of Engineering, 2014
- Thomas A. Edison Patent Award – American Society of Mechanical Engineers, 2013
- Fellow - The American Society of Mechanical Engineers (ASME), 2008
- Kaplan Prize for Creative Management of High Technology, 2002

== Personal life ==
Shoham is married to Tova. They have four sons and he is one of the founders of Hoshaya, where he lives. Their third son, Nadav, was killed in a snowstorm in Nepal in 2014. The Technion’s Robotraffic Competition was named after him.
