= Antonio Bicchi =

Italian robotics scientist

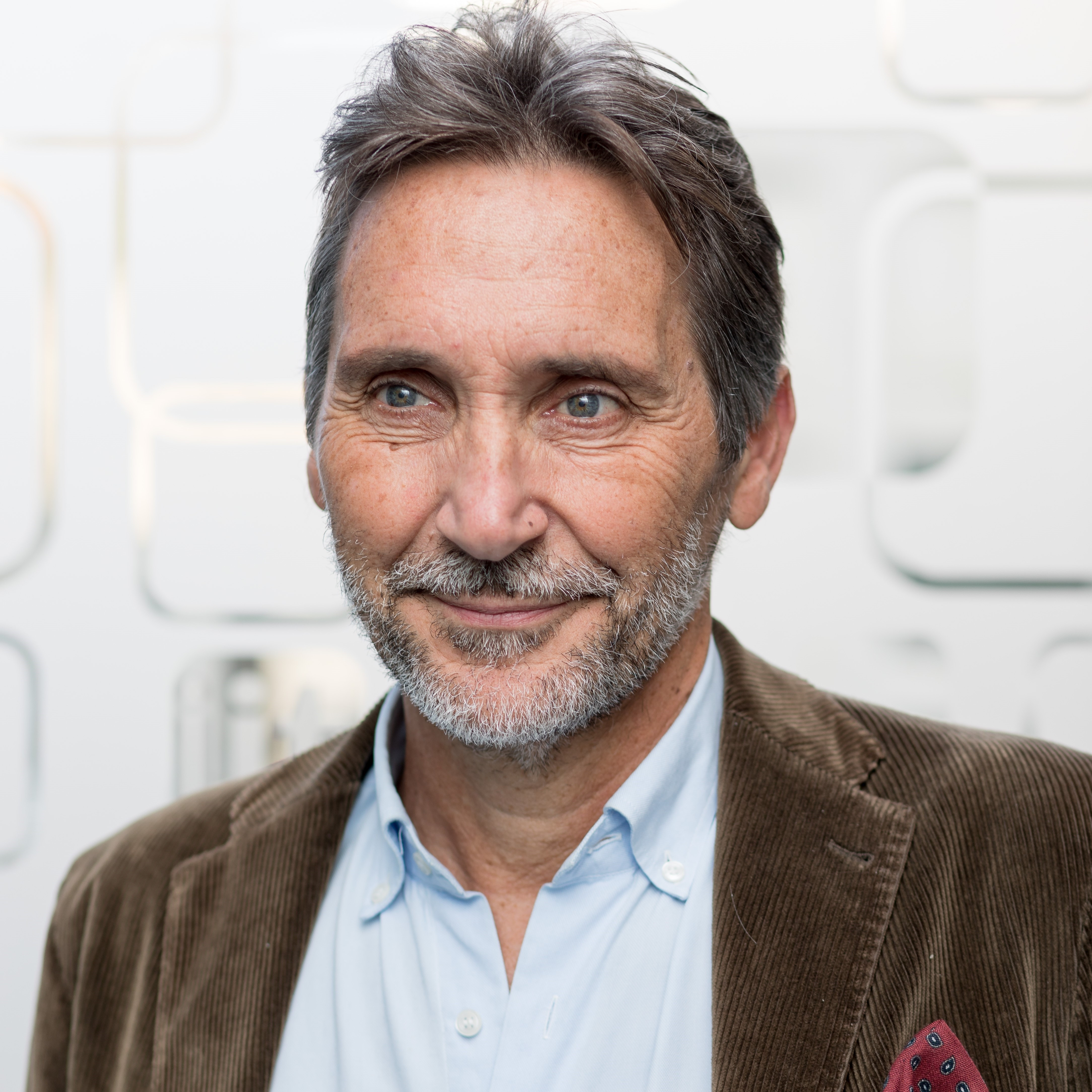
- Antonio Bicchi on the IIT SkyBridge, Nov. 2018
- Born: June 1, 1959 (age 67); Pontremoli, Italy
- Education: University of Pisa; University of Bologna
- Awards: IEEE Fellow (2005) IEEE RAS Saridis Leadership Award (2018) University of Pisa "Ordine del Cherubino” (2019)
- Scientific career
- Fields: Robotics; Haptics; Automatic Control
- Workplaces: Massachusetts Institute of Technology; University of Pisa; Istituto Italiano di Tecnologia; Arizona State University

Antonio Bicchi is an Italian scientist interested in robotics and intelligent machines. He is professor at the University of Pisa and senior researcher at Istituto Italiano di Tecnologia in Genoa. He is an adjunct professor at the School of Biological and Health Systems Engineering of Arizona State University in Tempe, Arizona, US.

He is the editor in chief of The International Journal of Robotics Research, the first scholarly publication on robotics research. He is a co-founder and current president of the Italian Institute of Robotics and Intelligent Machines.

He is a Fellow of IEEE since 2005, and received the IEEE Saridis Leadership Award and the “Ordine del Cherubino” from University of Pisa in 2019.

In 2025, he was recognized as a Pioneer of Robotics and Automation by IEEE .

== Academic career ==
After obtaining a Laurea (magna cum laude) from the University of Pisa in 1984 and a Ph.D. from University of Bologna in 1988, Bicchi was with the Artificial Intelligence Lab of the Massachusetts Institute of Technology in Cambridge, MA, USA.

From 1990s to 2012 he directed the Research Center “E. Piaggio” at the University of Pisa where he was also chairman of the Robotics in the Department of Information Engineering. During his direction, the Center grew in size and in scientific prestige, leading it to count more than 100 researchers and manage over 60 fundamental and applied research projects.

In 2009 he was appointed as senior scientist by the Istituto Italiano di Tecnologia in Genoa, where he leads the research line on Soft Robotics for Human Cooperation and Rehabilitation.

Since 2013 he serves as an adjunct professor of the School of Biological and Health Systems Engineering, Arizona State University in Tempe, Arizona, where he collaborates with Marco Santello and other colleagues in NSF and DARPA rehabilitation-oriented projects.

== Research ==
Bicchi has contributed to the fields of automatic control (the science and engineering of systems), to haptics (the science and technology for the sense of touch), and to robotics, specifically articulated soft robotics.

He has coordinated several important research projects funded by the EU in the FP7 and H2020 programmes, including CHAT (on the scalability, reconfigurability and security of distributed control for heterogeneous cyberphysical systems), PHRIENDS (on dependability and safety of physical human-robot interaction), THE Hand Embodied (on natural and artificial hands), and SoftPro (on the theory and open-source technologies for upper limb prosthetics and rehabilitation). He was scientific co-coordinator of several others, including TOUCH-HAPSYS (on haptics science and interfaces), WALK-MAN (on humanoid robots for disaster intervention), and SOMA (on soft manipulation systems).

His 2012-17 ERC AG project SoftHands used neuroscience and soft robotics technologies to develop a new generation of artificial hands. Two subsequent ERC PoC projects (SoftHands Pro-H and SoftHandler) explored the translation of these concepts in real-world products for prosthetics and industrial applications, respectively.

The ERC Synergy 2019 project “Natural BionicS” is producing the first completely integrated bionic limb system with direct spinal interfacing, through the cooperation of three groups at Imperial College (led by D. Farina), University Hospital Wien (O. Aszmann) and IIT (A. Bicchi). Two further ERC PoC grants have been awarded to explore technology transfer of haptic displays for prosthetics (project WISH) and of variable-stiffness upper limb prostheses (project V-Soft Pro).

== Organizer and Educator ==
Bicchi was president of the Italian Society of Automatic Control, twice vice-president of the IEEE Robotics and Automation Society, and collaborates with major centers for technology transfer in the Italian and European industry. He is a consultant for the European Commission, the Italian Ministry of Education and Research (MIUR) and agencies in many countries in Europe, America and Asia for the scientific evaluation and accreditation of research centers and universities, research projects, and researchers' careers.

In 2005 he founded the WorldHaptics Conference, since then the largest biennial research meeting in the sciences of touch. In 2011 he started the series of conferences Automatica which is the main Italian event in the field of Automatic Controls. In 2015 he founded and was subsequently editor-in-chief of the IEEE Robotics and Automation Letters magazine, which in just two years has become the largest scientific journal in the entire field. In 2019 he co-founded the Institute of Robotics and Intelligent Machines (I-RIM), the association of researchers and industrialists in the field whose motto is "AI, fleshed out." Since January, 2023, he is the editor in chief of The International Journal of Robotics Research.

The European Research Council (ERC) granted his research on human and robot hands with an Advanced Grant in 2012, a Synergy Grant in 2019, and four Proof-of-Concept grants.

He created and coordinates scientifically the JOiiNT Lab, an advanced tech transfer lab with leading-edge industries in the Kilometro Rosso Technology District in Bergamo, Italy.

Bicchi has 80 Ph.D.s awarded under his guidance. More than 20 former students of his hold now professorships in many universities and research institutions worldwide. Seven were finalists, and three won the ``G. Giralt Award'' for Best Ph.D. thesis in Robotics in 2013, 2019, and 2020. Two won the EuroHaptics Best Ph.D. Thesis award in 2015 and 2023. The IEEE RAS Early Career Award was awarded to two of his former students in 2021 and in 2023.
