= Amir Hussain (disambiguation) =

Amir Hussain may refer to:

- Amir Hussain, Pakistani Islamic scholar
- Amir Husain Al-Kurdi, 16th-century Egyptian governor
- Amir Hussain (cognitive scientist)
- Amir Hussain, boxer who competed for Iraq at the 1988 Summer Olympics
- Amir Husain, Pakistani-American AI entrepreneur
- Amir Hussain Lone, Indian cricketer
- Amir Hussain Sikder, Bangladeshi diplomat
- Amir Hossain, Bangladeshi judge
- Amir Hossain Amu, Bangladeshi politician
- Amir Hossain Babu, Bangladeshi dancer
- Amir Hosein Fardi, Iranian writer
- Amir Husayn
