= Roberto Cingolani =

Italian physicist, academic, and politician (born 1961)

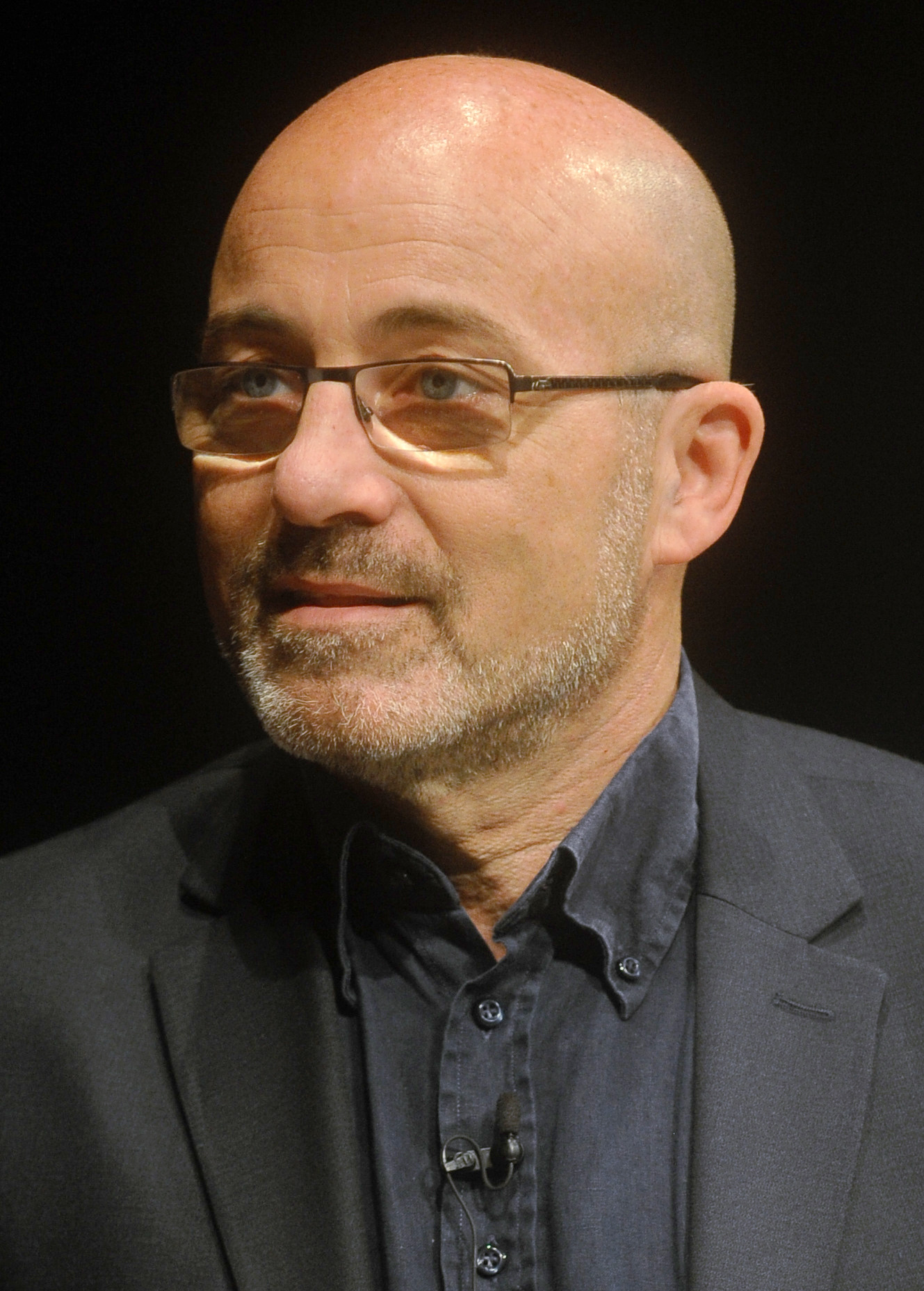
- Cingolani in 2018.

CEO and General Manager of Leonardo
- Incumbent
- Assumed office 9 May 2023
- Preceded by: Alessandro Profumo

Minister for Ecological Transition
- In office 13 February 2021 – 22 October 2022
- Prime Minister: Mario Draghi
- Preceded by: Sergio Costa (Environment)
- Succeeded by: Gilberto Pichetto Fratin

Personal details
- Born: 23 December 1961 (age 64) Milan, Italy
- Party: None
- Education: University of Bari; Scuola Normale di Pisa

Roberto Cingolani (born 23 December 1961) is an Italian physicist, academic, and manager who served as Minister for Ecological Transition in the Draghi government from 2021 to 2022. On 10 May 2023, the board of directors of Leonardo appointed Cingolani to the position of Chief Executive Officer (CEO) and General Manager.

== Early life and education ==
Cingolani was born on 23 December 1961 in Milan, in the Italian region of Lombardy. He spent his childhood in Bari, in the Southern Italy region of Apulia, where he graduated from the University of Bari in 1985 with a degree in physics. He obtained his doctorate there in November 1988, and his PhD at the Scuola Normale Superiore in Pisa in 1990.

== Academic career ==
From 1988 to 1991, Cingolani was a staff member of the Max Planck Institute in Stuttgart, Germany, under the direction of Nobel laureate Klaus von Klitzing. He planned to move permanently to Japan to work at the University of Tokyo but returned to Italy due to the death of his father. From 1991 to 1999, Cingolani was first researcher and then associate professor of general physics at the Materials Science Department of the University of Salento (then called the University of Lecce). Between 1997 and 2000, he was a visiting professor at the University of Tokyo, then at Virginia Commonwealth University in the United States.

From 2000 to 2005, Cingolani returned to the University of Salento, where he was professor of general physics at the Faculty of Engineering. There, he founded and directed the National Laboratory of Nanotechnologies in Lecce. In 2001, Cingolani worked as an expert for the Public Prosecutor's Office of Rome, giving expert opinions on the Marta Russo and Unabomber cases. From 2005 to 2019, Cingolani was scientific director of the Italian Institute of Technology (IIT) in Genoa. In December 2015, he was awarded the Rome Science Prize. In 2016, he worked on the birth of the Human Technopole in Milan, the project for a research institute for biology.

== Career in the private sector ==
From 2019 until 2021, Cingolani was Chief Technology and Innovation Officer at Leonardo; before this, he was scientific director at the IIT in Genoa from 2005 to 2019. In April 2019, he joined the board of directors of Illycaffè. In April 2020, he was appointed non-executive director on Ferrari's board of directors. He resigned from the board of directors of Ferrari on 16 February 2021. On 12 April 2023, the Italian government nominated Cingolani as the next CEO of Leonardo, a partially state-owned Italian multinational company specialising in aerospace, defence, and security. Cingolani initially joined Leonardo in 2019, becoming chief technology and innovation officer and spearheading cyber and AI programs, leaving in 2021. Stefano Pontecorvo was made the new Leonardo chairman. In an interview in May 2025, Cingolani stated that Europe would create large defence companies through mergers and acquisitions.

Cingolani returned to the internal negotiations within the Meloni government on the appointments of the top management of Leonardo, Enel, Eni, and Poste Italiane. Some observed argued that Law No. 60 of 1953 (Art. 6) would make the position of managing director of a subsidiary incompatible with that of former member of Parliament for a period of one year after leaving office, as in the case of Cingolani. In 2024, the Ethical Finance Foundation submitted a report on this matter to Leonardo's audit committee.

== Political career ==
After the Ponte Morandi collapse in 2018, Cingolani was selected by the first Conte government as a special commissioner for the reconstruction of the bridge; Cingolani refused this charge and suggested the name of Marco Bucci, who was subsequently appointed. On 13 February 2021, Cingolani was appointed minister for ecological transition in the national unity government led by Mario Draghi. The newly created role took over energy matters previously shared with other ministries and combined them with the environment portfolio. He criticized environmental activists for being too ideological in their approach and called for a slower sustainable transition. In turn, climate activists expressed concern over Cingolani's calls for a slower transition and his statements supporting increased use of natural gas. Together with the then Foreign Minister Luigi Di Maio, Cingolani appointed senior diplomat Alessandro Modiano as Italy's first-ever special envoy for climate change in January 2022. Since leaving government office, Cingolani began to informally advising Prime Minister Giorgia Meloni on energy policy.

== Other activities ==
Since 2023, Cingolani is a member the board of directors of De Mora.
