= Milan Innovation District =

Urban development in Milan, Italy

Milan Innovation District Science technology park MIND
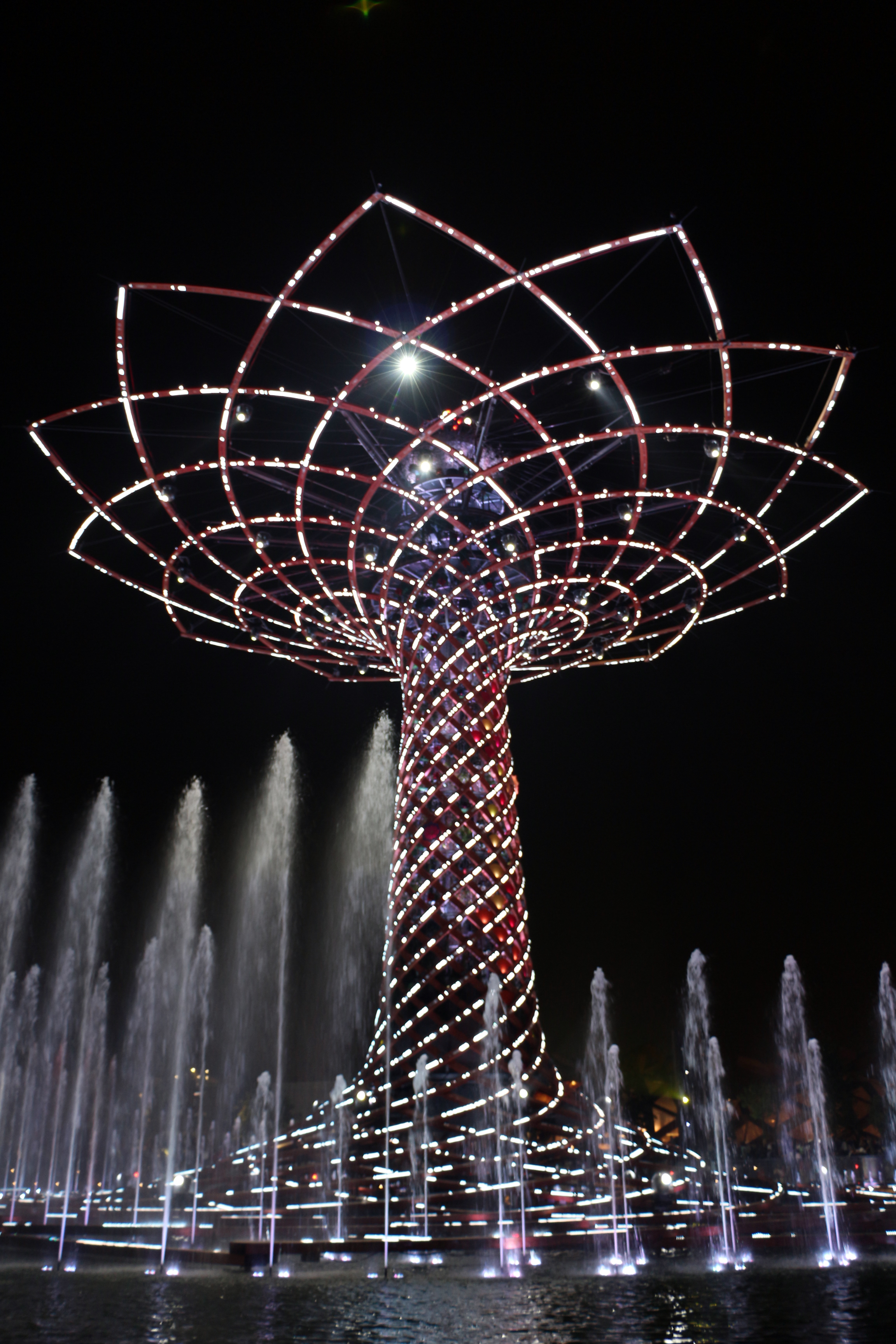
- Interactive map of Milan Innovation District
- Coordinates: 45°31′7″N 9°6′24″E
- Country: Italy
- City: Milan
- Time zone: CEST
- Website: www.mindmilano.it

Milano Innovation District (MIND) is the name given to the project dedicated to the area where Expo 2015 took place in Milan.

== History ==
=== Construction ===
The Milan Innovation District site is about 15 kilometres (9.3 mi) northwest of Milan, in the municipalities of Rho and Pero, and covers an area of 1.1 km2 (0.42 sq mi).
The site includes the reuse of the same exhibition areas used for Expo 2015.

=== Master Plan ===
- Human Technopole - The Italian Research Institute for Life Sciences (located at Palazzo Italia)
- Hospital Galeazzi (operational since August 2022)
- The campus of the University of Milan (currently under construction)
- Fondazione Triulza

== Companies ==
- AstraZeneca

== See also ==
- Genoa Erzelli GREAT Campus
- Istituto Italiano di Tecnologia
