= International Journal of Humanoid Robotics =

- Discipline: Robotics, engineering
- Language: English

Publication details
- Publisher: World Scientific
- Frequency: Quarterly
- Impact factor: 0.908 (2017)

Standard abbreviations
- ISO 4: Int. J. Humanoid Robot.

Indexing
- ISSN: 0219-8436 (print); 1793-6942 (web)
- OCLC no.: 648909734

Links
- Journal homepage; Online archive

The International Journal of Humanoid Robotics is a quarterly peer-reviewed scientific journal covering the development of intelligent humanoid robots, both theoretical and practical, with an emphasis on future projections. Some areas covered include design, mental architecture, kinematics, visual perception and human–robot interaction. It was established in 2004 and is published by World Scientific. The editors-in-chief are Ming Xie (Nanyang Technological University), Juyang Weng (Michigan State University), and Jean-Guy Fontaine (Istituto Italiano di Tecnologia).

== Abstracting and indexing ==
The journal is abstracted and indexed in Compendex, Science Citation Index Expanded, Current Contents/Engineering, Computing, and Technology, Inspec, and Scopus. According to the Journal Citation Reports, the journal has a 2012 impact factor of 0.368.

== See also ==
- List of robotics journals
