= Reconfigurable manufacturing system =

20th-century reconfigurable machine

A reconfigurable manufacturing system (RMS) is a system invented in 1998 that is designed for the outset of rapid change in its structure, as well as its hardware and software components, in order to quickly adjust its production capacity and functionality within a part family in response to sudden market changes or intrinsic system change. A reconfigurable machine can have its features and parts machined.

== History ==
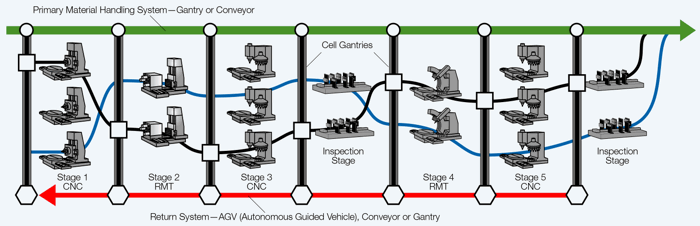
A schematic diagram of Koren's RMS, drawn by Rod Hill

The RMS, as well as one of its components—the reconfigurable machine tool (RMT)—were invented in 1998 in the Engineering Research Center for Reconfigurable Manufacturing Systems (ERC/RMS) at the University of Michigan College of Engineering. The term reconfigurability in manufacturing was likely coined by Kusiak and Lee.

From 1996 to 2007, Yoram Koren received an NSF grant of $32.5 million to develop the RMS science base and its software and hardware tools. RMS technology is based on an approach that consists of key elements, the compilation of which is called the RMS science base.

== System operations ==
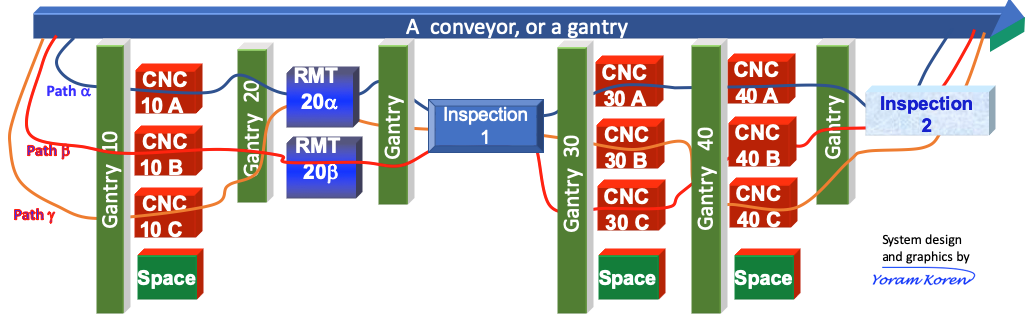
Reconfigurable Manufacturing System Architecture by Y. Koren

The system is composed of stages: 10, 20, 30, etc. Each stage consists of identical machines, such as CNC milling machines. The system produces one product. The manufactured product moves on the horizontal conveyor. Then Gantry-10 grips the product and brings it to one of CNC-10. When CNC-10 finishes the processing, Gantry-10 moves it back to the conveyor. The conveyor moves the product to Gantry-20, which grips the product and loads it on the RMT-20, and so on. Inspection machines are placed at several stages and at the end of the manufacturing system.

The product may move during its production in many production paths. In practice, there are small variations in the precision of identical machines, which create accumulated errors in the manufactured product; each path has its own "stream-of-variations" (a term coined by Y. Koren).

== Characteristics ==
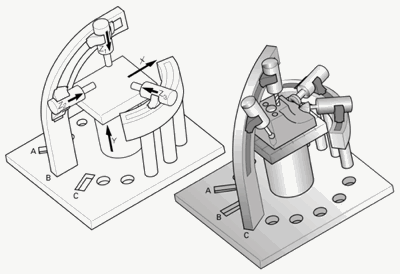
RMT patent drawing: US 5943750. A patent of a reconfigurable machine tool with a modular structure, containing spindle modules that can be reconfigured to allow different machining operations.

Ideal reconfigurable manufacturing systems, according to professor Yoram Koren in 1995, possess six characteristics: modularity, integrability, customized flexibility, scalability, convertibility, and diagnosability. Characteristics for its components are: reconfigurable machines, controllers, and system control software. An RMS does not necessarily have all of the characteristics. These principles are called Koren's RMS principles. Supposedly, the more of these principles applicable to a given manufacturing system, the more reconfigurable that system is. The RMS principles are:

The components of RMS are CNC machines, reconfigurable tools, reconfigurable inspection machines, and material transport systems (such as gantries and conveyors) that connect the machines to form the system. Different arrangements and configurations of these machines will affect the system's productivity. A collection of mathematical tools, which are defined as the RMS science base, may be used to maximize system productivity with the smallest possible number of machines.

== See also ==
- Modular design
