= Amir Husain =

Pakistani-American entrepreneur

- Amir Husain
- Born: November 7, 1977 (age 48); Lahore, Punjab, Pakistan
- Education: Punjab Institute of Computer Science (BS); University of Texas at Austin (BS, MS)
- Occupations: Entrepreneur, author, technologist, inventor
- Known for: Artificial intelligence expertise
- Relatives: Tasneem Zehra Husain (sister)
- Website: amirhusain.com

Amir Husain is a Pakistani-American entrepreneur, artificial intelligence technologist, inventor, and author whose work has focused on autonomous systems, robotics, and emerging technologies in computer science.

== Early life ==
Husain was born in Lahore, Punjab, Pakistan. His father was a businessman and his mother an educator. As a child, Husain attended Aitchison College. He first encountered a computer, a Commodore 64, at the age of four. He later recalled becoming fascinated with computing, constructing a model computer from toys and cardboard. Husain left conventional schooling after the eighth grade and began writing and selling software. At age 15, Husain enrolled at the Punjab Institute of Computer Science, graduating two years later with a bachelor's degree in computer science.

Husain subsequently moved to the United States to continue his education at the University of Texas at Austin. He arrived in 1996 intending to enter the master's program in computer science, but was denied admission because of his age. He instead enrolled in the undergraduate computer science program and earned a second bachelor's degree. While still an undergraduate, he joined the university's Distributed Multimedia Computing Laboratory (DMCL). Husain later entered the doctoral program but left in 1999 before completing his Ph.D. to found his first startup, Kurion. He later completed a Master of Science in computer science at the University of Texas at Austin.

== Career ==
Husain founded Kurion, a web services company focused on personalized online services, in 1999. In 2001, the company was acquired by iSyndicate, then the world's largest internet content syndication company.

He subsequently founded Inframanage, a systems-management software company that merged with ClearCube Technology in 2002. Husain joined ClearCube as chief technology officer and chief architect, remaining with the company until 2008. He later was chief executive officer of VDIworks, a virtualization and cloud-computing software company, from 2008 to 2013.

In 2013, Husain founded SparkCognition, an artificial intelligence software company based in Austin. He was its chief executive officer until 2024. His first investor at the new company was Michael Dell. Boeing, CME Group, Verizon, State Street and others followed. The company gained clients such as Apergy, Boeing and Aker BP, Honeywell Aerospace, Flowserve, and Defense Innovation Unit.

In 2018, Husain co-founded SkyGrid, a joint venture between Boeing and SparkCognition focused on autonomous aviation and airspace management. He was its president and chief executive officer until 2023 and as a director until 2024. In 2025, SkyGrid became a subsidiary of Wisk Aero, a Boeing-owned autonomous aviation company.

Husain also founded SparkCognition Government Systems (SGS), an artificial intelligence company focused on government applications, in 2020. The company was later renamed Avathon Government.

In January 2022, SparkCognition raised $123 million in Series D financing at a unicorn valuation of more than $1.4 billion, bringing its total capital raised to $300 million. The company was renamed Avathon in 2024, with Husain remaining a member of its board of directors.

In 2024, Husain was appointed chairman of WorldQuant Predictive and subsequently became chairman of WorldQuant Foundry, a technology venture-incubation platform launched later that year. He has also founded or co-founded several technology ventures including SpecFive, a mesh-networking company, and Argon Mechatronics, a robotics company focused on precision manufacturing.

== Advisory and policy work ==
Amir and Zaib Husain attending sessions at the United Nations General Assembly 2026

In 2018, Husain joined the Center for a New American Security (CNAS) Task Force on Artificial Intelligence and National Security, which examined the national-security implications of artificial intelligence. The task force was co-chaired by former U.S. Deputy Secretary of Defense Robert O. Work and Carnegie Mellon University computer scientist Andrew W. Moore.

In April 2018, Husain presented at the National Academies of Sciences, Engineering, and Medicine's Presidents' Circle meeting, Intelligence: Real and Artificial. He delivered a presentation titled "Traversing the Ideascape: Idea Generation and Pruning in Synthetic Systems" and led a panel on artificial intelligence.

Husain was on NATO's Maritime Unmanned Systems Innovation and Coordination Cell's (MUSIC^2) MUS Innovation Advisory Board, established to advise NATO on the development and integration of maritime autonomous and unmanned technologies. Contemporary accounts of the board's formation cited Husain's talks on exponential technologies as one of its inspirations.

Husain also was on the Council on Foreign Relations Independent Task Force on U.S. Innovation Strategy and National Security, co-chaired by Admiral William H. McRaven and James Manyika. The task force, whose members also included Eric Schmidt and Yahoo! co-founder Jerry Yang, published the 2019 report Innovation and National Security: Keeping Our Edge.

In September 2026, Husain was appointed a founding member of the inaugural Industrial Advisory Board of the Asian American Academy of Sciences and Engineering.

== Writing and ideas ==
Husain has written extensively on artificial intelligence, computing, autonomous systems and technology policy. He is a contributor to Forbes, where his essays have addressed subjects including artificial intelligence and employment, robotics and physical AI, autonomous agents, cybersecurity, programming, computing infrastructure, and military applications of AI. His work has also appeared in publications including Computerworld, Network World, Proceedings of the U.S. Naval Institute, and Foreign Policy.

In 2017, Husain and retired four-star U.S. Marine Corps General John R. Allen introduced the modern concept of hyperwar, a term now used to describe a form of AI-enabled warfare in which increasingly autonomous systems compress military decision-making cycles to machine speed. They first developed the concept publicly in an article, On Hyperwar, for the U.S. Naval Institute's Proceedings and later expanded on it in the 2018 book Hyperwar: Conflict and Competition in the AI Century. Since its introduction, the term has been widely adopted in literature discussing AI-enabled conflicts. In 2018, Allen and Husain further developed the concept in a second Proceedings article, AI Will Change the Balance of Power, arguing that artificial intelligence and autonomous systems would alter traditional measures of military power.

Husain's first book, The Sentient Machine: The Coming Age of Artificial Intelligence (2017), examined the growing role of artificial intelligence in society and argued for a broadly optimistic approach to human coexistence with increasingly capable machines while also considering the risks of automation and malicious uses of AI. He subsequently wrote works on generative artificial intelligence, computational creativity, and the history of computing, including Generative AI for Leaders (2023), Generative Art (2023), and Serious Machines (2024).

In The Cybernetic Society: How Humans and Machines Will Shape the Future Together (2025), Husain developed the idea of a "cybernetic society", in which humans and intelligent machines increasingly operate as parts of interconnected feedback systems across business, cities, politics, economics, and warfare. Husain argued that artificial intelligence is evolving from a discrete technological tool into an increasingly integrated participant in human institutions and decision-making.

== Honors, patents, and institutional service ==
Husain was named Top Technology Entrepreneur of the year by the Austin Business Journal, and received the Austin Under 40 Technology and Science Award in 2016. He was also named an Onalytica Top 100 Artificial Intelligence Influencer, and was a finalist for EY Entrepreneur of the Year in 2018.

In 2023, the University of Texas at Austin College of Natural Sciences inducted Husain into its Hall of Honor as a Distinguished Alumnus. In 2025, he received the university's Presidential Citation, UT Austin's highest honor. He was also the commencement speaker for the College of Natural Sciences graduating class that year.

Husain holds 50 patents in artificial intelligence and distributed systems. He has also received various awards from CRN, Nokia, PC World, and VMworld, among others. In 2013, a low-cost computing platform designed by Husain was inducted into the collection of the Computer History Museum in Mountain View, California.

Husain was on the Board of Advisors for IBM Watson, and is on the University of Texas at Austin's Computer Science Advisory Council and President's Advisory Council. Together with his wife, Zaib Husain, he gave $5 million in 2020 to establish UT Austin's Machine Learning Laboratory, which houses the National Science Foundation's AI Institute for Foundations of Machine Learning.

In 2025, Husain was appointed to the University Advisory Board of the Lahore University of Management Sciences (LUMS). He delivered the keynote address at the university's 2026 convocation.

== Personal life ==
Husain married Zaib Iqtidar in 2002. He lives in Austin, Texas.

== Bibliography ==
- Durrani, Q.S.; Husain, S.A.; Khawaja, M.N.; Yaqub, M. (1995). "The distributed learning environment (DLE)". 1995 IEEE International Conference on Systems, Man and Cybernetics. Intelligent Systems for the 21st Century. Vol. 5. IEEE. pp. 4313–4318. doi:10.1109/ICSMC.1995.538470. ISBN 0-7803-2559-1. S2CID 62699272.
- Husain, S.A.; Durrani, Q.S.; Ajmal, A. (1997). "The Interaktiv tutor". 1997 IEEE International Conference on Systems, Man, and Cybernetics. Computational Cybernetics and Simulation. Vol. 3. IEEE. pp. 2632–2637. doi:10.1109/ICSMC.1997.635332. ISBN 0-7803-4053-1. S2CID 61764781.
- Husain, Amir (2017). The Sentient Machine: The Coming Age of Artificial Intelligence. New York, NY: Scribner. ISBN 978-1501144677.
- Husain, Amir; Allen, John R.; Work, Robert O.; Cole, August; Scharre, Paul; Porter, Bruce; Anderson, Wendy R.; Townsend, Jim (2018). Hyperwar: Conflict and Competition in the AI Century. SparkCognition Press. ISBN 978-1732597006.
- Husain, Amir (2023). Generative AI for Leaders: Unleash the Power of Generative AI to Transform Your Business and Lead the Future. AM Press. ISBN 978-8-9884751-5-6
- Husain, Amir (2023). Generative Art: Use the Power of Algorithms to Create Stunning Patterns. AM Press. ISBN 979-8-9884751-3-2
- Husain, Amir (2024). Serious Machines: The Story of the Computers That Built the Modern World. AM Press. ISBN 979-8-9884751-8-7
- Husain, Amir (2025). The Cybernetic Society: How Humans and Machines Will Shape the Future Together. New York: Basic Books. ISBN 978-1-5416-0571-8
