= Tasneem Zehra Husain =

Pakistani physicist

- Born: Lahore, Pakistan
- Citizenship: Pakistani
- Education: Kinnaird College; Quaid-i-Azam University; International Center for Theoretical Physics; Stockholm University
- Relatives: Amir Husain (brother)
- Scientific career
- Fields: Theoretical Physics
- Workplaces: Lahore University of Management Sciences (LUMS); International Center for Theoretical Physics (ICTP); Delaware University (DU); National Center for Physics (NCP)
- Doctoral advisor: Ansar Fayyazuddin
- Website: tasneemzehrahusain.com

Tasneem Zehra Husain is a Pakistani theoretical physicist. She has represented Pakistan at the Meeting of Nobel Laureates in Lindau, Germany and led the Pakistan team to the World Year of Physics (WYP) Launch Conference in Paris. In 2013, Husain was invited by the Cambridge Science Festival to be the moderator for a panel of eminent scientists.

== Biography ==
=== Early life ===
Husain received her early education in Lahore. At the age of eleven, Husain dropped out of a regular school and was home schooled. Husain sat for her O Levels (privately, through the British Council) at the age of 13 and went on to take her A Levels at the age of 15. During these years, Husain wrote extensively. In 1988, she won an international essay competition held by the Children as the Peacemakers Foundation based in California, USA. In an interview given to the Dawn news, Husain has been misquoted as saying that this 'isolation' created problems for her at Kinnaird College, when she went there for her under-graduate education.

=== Education ===
Husain attended Kinnaird College in Lahore where she obtained her Bachelor of Science (BSc) in Mathematics and Physics. This was followed by a Master of Science (M.S.) in Physics from the Quaid-i-Azam University in Islamabad. She then went to Trieste, Italy on a scholarship awarded by the Abdus Salam International Centre for Theoretical Physics (ICTP) for a yearlong post-graduate degree in the field of High-Energy Physics. Husain obtained her PhD in theoretical physics from Stockholm University in 2003, where her thesis advisor was Ansar Fayyazuddin. She completed her PhD in theoretical physics at the age of twenty-six, becoming the first Pakistani woman string theorist, after which she went to Harvard University for a two-year post-doctoral research position.

== Career in physics ==
After her post-doctoral stint at Harvard University, Husain moved back to Pakistan, where she joined the Lahore University of Management Sciences's School of Science and Engineering.

She became an assistant professor of physics. Husain's academic research focuses on using eleven-dimensional supergravity to arrive at a classification of the flux backgrounds that arise when M-branes wrap supersymmetric cycles.

Tasneem is also a writer, known for her novel, Only The Longest Threads. She has also written columns for 3quarksdaily.com, and teaches writing classes at CERN.

== Advocate for science in Pakistan ==
Husain has become a vocal and vehement supporter of science in Pakistan. Keenly interested in education and science popularisation in her country, she designed Pakistan's logo for the World Year of Physics (WYP) and was an active participant in the WYP Physics Stories project, led by Argonne National Laboratory of the United States. Husain helped the Lahore University of Management Sciences in establishing a School of Science and Engineering to allow students to stay in Pakistan to pursue an education in the sciences.

Husain has made contemporary efforts to make basic theoretical physics accessible to high-school students, and has developed a series of animated presentations which she delivered to various high school and college students. Husain has also taught both Mathematics and Physics at her alma mater, Kinnaird College.

== Writing ==
In November 2014, Husain released her first novel, Only the Longest Threads. Kirkus Reviews described the novel as, "A fictional approach to physics that captures both the substance of the theory and the passion of its practitioners."

== External resources ==
- Husain, Tasneem-Zehra (8 August 2003). "A brane teaser". Journal of High Energy Physics. 2003 (8): 014. arXiv:hep-th/0306248. Bibcode:2003JHEP...08..014Z. doi:10.1088/1126-6708/2003/08/014. S2CID 50322937.
