= Genoa Erzelli GREAT Campus =

GREAT Campus Science technology park Genoa Erzelli
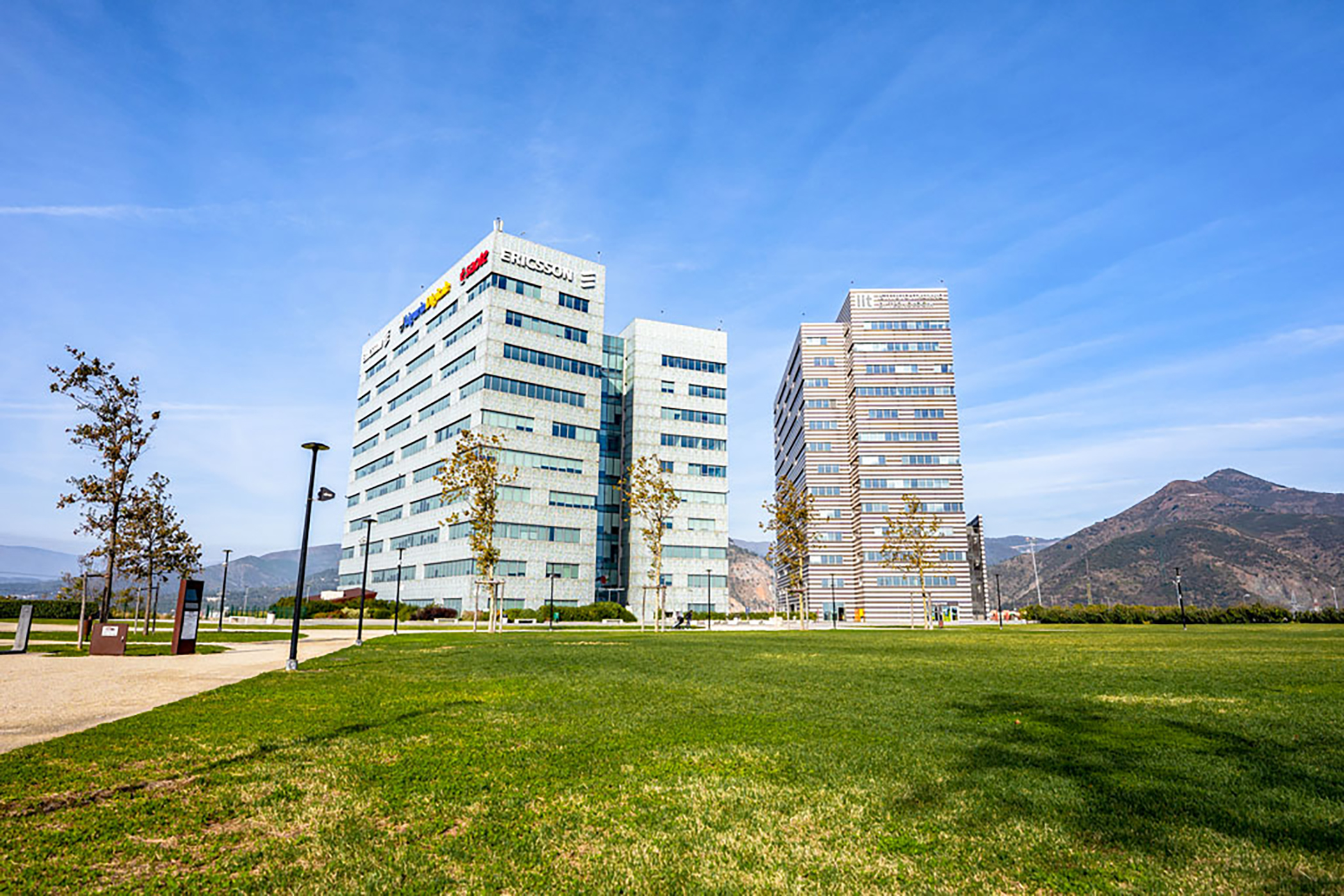
- Skyscrapers in the Erzelli GREAT campus in December 2018
- Interactive map of GREAT Campus
- Coordinates: 44°25′32.87″N 8°51′46.37″E
- Nation: European Union
- Country: Italy
- City: Genoa
- Established: 2 April 2003

Government
  - Founder: Carlo Castellano
  - Project company: Genova High Tech S.p.A.

Area
  - Total: 0.44 km^{2} (0.17 sq mi)
- Time zone: CEST
- Website: Great-Campus.it

The GREAT Campus is a science technology park located on the Erzelli hill in Genoa, in northwest Italy. The park is partly under ongoing construction and partly already working. At the moment, it hosts several high tech corporations such as Ericsson, Siemens, and Esaote, in addition to a robotics laboratory of the Istituto Italiano di Tecnologia (IIT) and other companies.

== History ==
=== The foundation ===
In the early 2000s, a group of entrepreneurs and managers gathered in the Ligurian Dixet association, constitute the Genova High Tech S.p.A. company aimed precisely to the realization of the technology park. The company is led by Carlo Castellano, CEO of Esaote S.p.A., and Giuseppe Rasero, former director of the Institute for Industrial Reconstruction (IRI). Your company has, among others, shares of Intesa Sanpaolo, Banca Carige, Aurora Construction, Coop Liguria, Prometheus srl, Talea S.p.A. and EuroMilano S.p.A.

=== The construction ===
The Erzelli is an area about 0.44 km^{2} wide located in Genoa between the neighborhoods of Sestri Ponente and Cornigliano. It was created by clipping the top of the Monte Guano and using the resulting material for the construction of the Genoa Cristoforo Colombo Airport. Thanks to a major urban improvement project, it is set to house the Erzelli Science and Technology Village which will give the city of Genoa an innovative high technology, research, training and business center. It is destined to change Genoa's image while giving the city a 100 thousand square metre park with many facilities and 200 thousand square meters of green areas along the slopes of Monte Guano. Sports, leisure and entertainment facilities will be set up here.

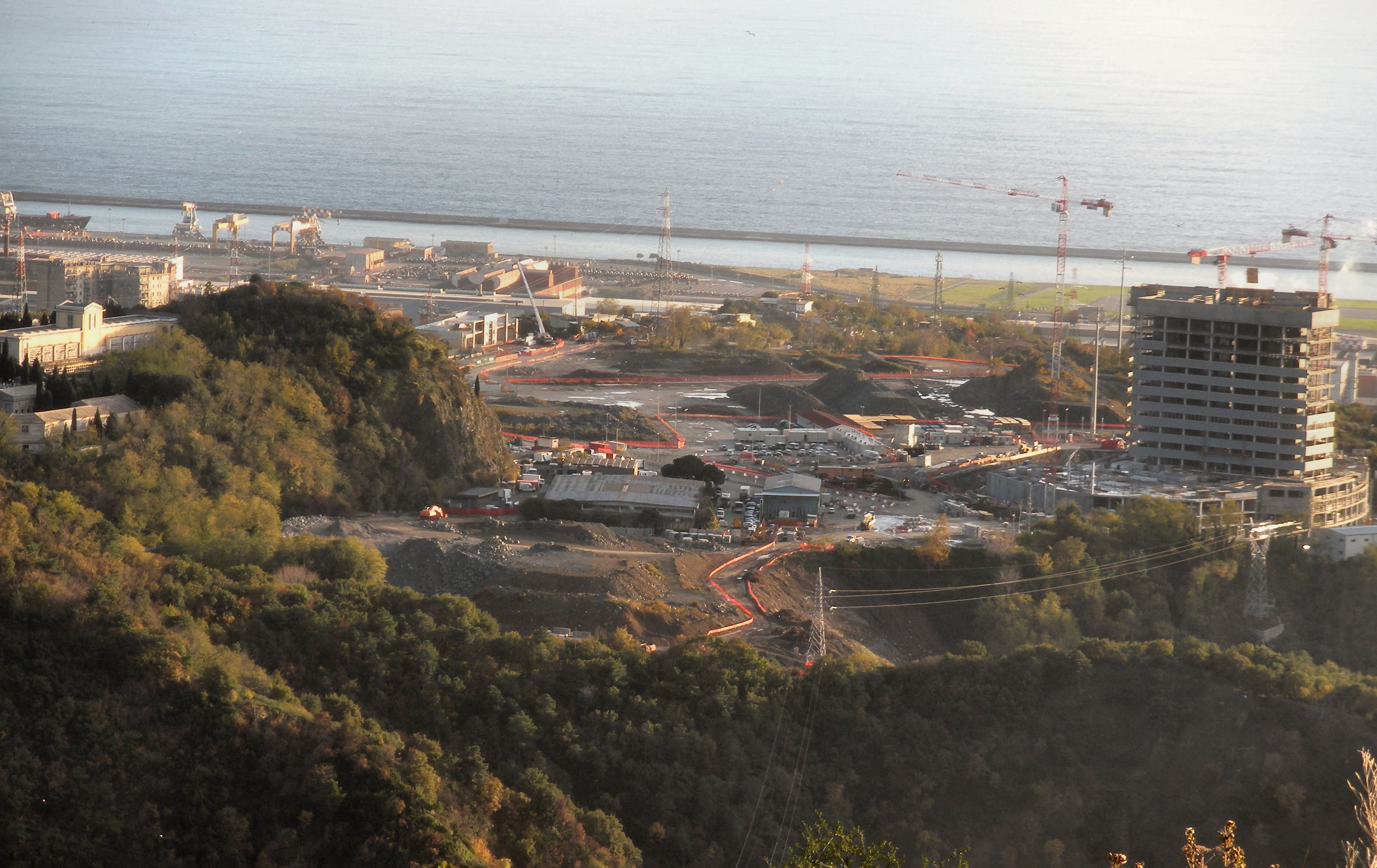
The Erzelli esplanade and the works in progress for building the new technology center (November 2010)

=== The Master Plan ===
The Master Plan foresees that some 70% of the Village will be used for high tech and training/education with around 200 businesses established, 15,000 new users including 5,000 students and the creation of at least 6,000 jobs for highly qualified persons. The residential areas will be developed in the most scenic locations and shall be close to parks and facilities. Genoa University Faculty of Engineering, buildings for high tech businesses, urban village/park, recreation facilities, commercial services, residences for students and researchers.
These high technology companies are relocated in the Erzelli park:

- Ericsson (May 2012)
- Talent Garden (December 2013)
- Siemens (January 2014)
- Alten Italia (March 2016)
- Enega (March 2016)
- Esaote (May 2016)
- IIT - Istituto Italiano di Tecnologia (December 2016)
- Liguria Digitale (Regione Liguria) (March 2017)
- FOS – Liguria Innovation Exchange (July 2020)
- H4E – Hub For Entrepreneurship (June 2023)

=== The expansion ===
On March 28, 2025, the "Genova Capitale dell’High Performance Computing per la Ricerca Biomedica" protocol was signed between research bodies, companies and institutions such as Consiglio Nazionale delle Ricerche, Camera di Commercio di Genova, Confindustria Genova, Istituto Italiano di Tecnologia, Istituto Giannina Gaslini, Leonardo, Liguria Digitale, Mnesys, Ospedale Policlinico San Martino, RAISE and the University of Genoa. The event, held at the Great Campus Parco Scientifico Tecnologico - Edificio A in via Enrico Melen 77, organized by the CEO Pier Paolo Greco and the general director Enrico Castanini of Liguria Digitale, was attended by President Marco Bucci for the Liguria Region and the acting Deputy Mayor Pietro Piciocchi for the Municipality of Genoa, the CEO of Leonardo Roberto Cingolani, the undersecretary to the Presidency of the Council of Ministers for technological innovation Alessio Butti, the Deputy Minister of Infrastructure and Sustainable Mobility Edoardo Rixi, the Full Professor Mario Marchese for the University of Genoa, the Scientific Director of IIT Giorgio Metta and many others. The interviews with the participants were conducted by the director of the daily newspaper Il Secolo XIX, Michele Brambilla. The purpose of the event is also to nominate Genoa as the "Capitale del Super Calcolo" to start the construction of one of the 4 European AI gigafactories in Genoa. While the signing of the Protocol constitutes a strategic step towards the goal of "Genova Capitale italiana del Dato". The candidacy of Genoa is supported by the presence of two supercomputers, Leonardo's Davinci-1 in Torre Fiumara and IIT's Franklin, hosted by Liguria Digitale, both of which are destined to be further upgraded.

In 2026, the GREAT Campus will host the new Faculty of Engineering of the local Università di Genova.

== See also ==
- University of Genoa
- Italian Institute of Technology
- Artificial Intelligence Exposition | C1A0 EXPO in Genoa
