= Esaote =

Biomedical equipment company

- Type: Private
- Industry: Medical equipment
- Founded: 1982; 44 years ago
- Founder: Carlo Castellano
- Headquarters: Genoa, Italy
- Products: Medical ultrasound, Magnetic resonance imaging
- Website: www.esaote.com

Esaote SpA is an Italian company operating in the biomedical sector that deals with the design, production, sale and maintenance of equipment for medical diagnostics.

== History ==
Esaote was founded in Genoa in 1982 as a division of Biomedical Electronics Ansaldo Ansaldo SpA. In 1984, its activities with those of Elsag SpA converge in Esacontrol. In 1986 STET acquires Tuscan Officine Elettromeccaniche Biomedica - OTE Biomedica Elettronica SpA and in 1988 moved to the Finmeccanica which shall merge it with the biomedical sector Esacontrol, giving rise to Esaote Biomedica SpA, created by Elsag, Selenia and Ansaldo (hence the acronym ESA). Privatized by the state in 1994, it changed its name to Esaote SpA and two years later was listed on the Milan Stock Exchange, which was released in 2003 following a takeover bid for 100% of the share capital sponsored by Bracco SpA, already the majority shareholder since 1998 through Bracco Holding NV.

In May 2016, Esaote opened a new office at the Erzelli science and technology park of Genoa.

In March 2017, the company inaugurated in Florence the new Center of Excellence for the production of probes and transducers for ultrasound diagnostic systems and a new hub, worldwide, located in Sesto Fiorentino (Florence). In May Esaote moved the production of dedicated magnetic resonance systems from the "historic" headquarters in Genoa, in via Siffredi, to a new, modern production plant built in Genoa Multedo. The activities of the Group's Research and Development laboratories for magnetic resonance imaging, the ultrasound diagnostic system repair center and the spare parts center for all equipment are also concentrated in the same location.

In December 2017, 100% of Esaote was sold for between 300-400 million euros to a consortium of entrepreneur investors made up of six chinese leading companies in the medical technology sector and investment funds with experience in healthcare. Under the agreement, finalized in April 2018 after the favorable opinion of the Italian government in February, the headquarters of Esaote remain in Genoa and Karl-Heinz Lumpi at the helm of the company. In May 2019 new CEO: Franco Fontana, in the company since 2008.

== See also ==
- Genoa Erzelli GREAT Campus
