= Modar Alaoui =

Moroccan-American entrepreneur

- Alaoui in 2025
- Born: Fez, Morocco
- Education: Concordia University; HEC Montréal
- Occupations: venture capital investor, entrepreneur
- Years active: 2008–present
- Known for: ALM Ventures, Humanoids Summit, Eyeris
- Title: Founder and General Partner of ALM Ventures; Founder and Chairman of Humanoids Summit

Modar Alaoui is an American tech entrepreneur and venture capitalist based in Silicon Valley, known for his work in artificial intelligence (AI), humanoid robotics, and computer vision. He is the founder and general partner of ALM Ventures, a Silicon Valley-based venture capital firm. He is also the founder and chair of the Humanoids Summit and the founder and chief executive officer (CEO) of Eyeris Technologies, Inc., an AI software company based in Mountain View, California.

== Early life and education ==
Born in Fez, Morocco, Alaoui moved to Montréal for his education, attending HEC Montréal and Concordia University. While at Concordia, Alaoui founded AIM Banking; a fintech company providing card terminals and managing processing rates for merchants. He later sold the company and moved to the United States.

== Career ==
After completing his education at Concordia University, Alaoui worked at Dell for two years before joining InVision. Following InVision's acquisition by AudioVox, two years later, he left the company.

In March 2008, Modar founded Eyeris TV, a U.S.-based in-store television network that applied facial recognition technology to measure audience demographics and deliver targeted short-form video content and advertisements. The company received several awards, including one for innovation and technology from the Florida Business Expo. In 2011, it initiated a research and development project focused on facial microexpression-based emotion recognition and additional facial analytics beyond age and gender classification. In 2013, the company relocated to Silicon Valley. It then adopted deep learning methods built on artificial neural networks for emotion recognition and related facial analytics, and rebranded as Eyeris Technologies, Inc. Its primary product at that time was computer vision software designed to analyze facial microexpressions in real-time.

In early 2014, Alaoui and his engineering team adapted the technology for automotive applications to support Advanced Driver Assistance Systems (ADAS). In June 2014, in Detroit, Michigan, Alaoui publicly announced a driver monitoring system (DMS) that detects driver attention, cognitive awareness and emotional distraction.

In 2019, regulatory developments in the automotive industry, such as Euro NCAP mandate for camera-based Driver Monitoring System and Occupant Monitoring System (OMS) aligned with Eyeris' interior monitoring technology. In 2020, Alaoui introduced an in-cabin sensor fusion AI at the CES 2020 which was held in Las Vegas, Nevada.

In 2022, Alaoui unveiled a monocular 3D sensing technology that converts 2D sensor data into depth-aware outputs for 3D scene reconstruction. It debuted at the first InCabin conference in Brussels.

== Awards and recognition ==
Alaoui and Eyeris have received multiple industry awards, including four AutoTech Awards (Automotive Tech Company of the Year, Automotive Product of the Year), and three Global Automotive Awards.
