= IEEE Robotics and Automation Society =

The IEEE Robotics and Automation Society (IEEE RAS) is a professional society of the IEEE that supports the development and the exchange of scientific knowledge in the fields of robotics and automation, including applied and theoretical issues.

== History ==
The initial IEEE Robotics and Automation (R&A) entity, the Robotics and Automation Council, was founded in 1984 by a number of IEEE Societies including Aerospace and Electronic Systems, Circuits and Systems, Components, Hybrids, and Manufacturing Technology, Computers, Control Systems, Industrial Electronics, Industry Applications, and Systems, Man and Cybernetics. In 1987 the council became the IEEE Robotics and Automation Society.

== Field of interest ==
The Society states in its constitution that it "is interested in both applied and theoretical issues in robotics and automation. Robotics is here defined to include intelligent machines and systems used, for example, in space exploration, human services, or manufacturing; whereas automation includes the use of automated methods in various applications, for example, factory, office, home, or transportation systems to improve performance and productivity."

== Publications ==
The society publishes a range of peer-reviewed journals, including

- IEEE Transactions on Robotics
- IEEE Transactions on Automation Science and Engineering
- IEEE Robotics and Automation Magazine
- IEEE Robotics and Automation Letters

Co-sponsored publications include:

- IEEE/ASME MicroElectroMechanical Systems Journal (MEMS)
- IEEE/ASME Transactions on Mechatronics
- IEEE Transactions on Haptics
- IEEE Transactions on Mobile Computing
- IEEE Transactions on Nano–Bio Science
- IEEE Transactions on Nanotechnology
- IEEE Sensors Journal
- IEEE Systems Journal

== Conferences ==
The IEEE Robotics and Automation Society sponsors and co-sponsors a number of annual international conferences such as the International Conference on Robotics and Automation, the International Conference on Automation Science and Engineering and International Conference on Intelligent Robots and Systems.
