= Amir Hussain (cognitive scientist) =

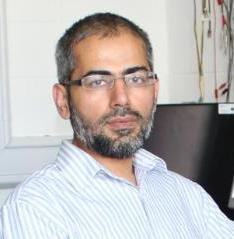
- Occupations: Chair Professor of Artificial Intelligence, King Fahd University of Petroleum and Minerals

Academic background
- Education: BEng (1st Class Honours with distinction), PhD (University of Strathclyde, Glasgow, UK)
- Alma mater: University of Strathclyde

Academic work
- Discipline: Artificial Intelligence
- Website: https://www.napier.ac.uk/people/amir-hussain

Amir Hussain is a cognitive scientist, Director of the Cognitive Big Data and Cybersecurity (CogBID) Research Lab and Chair Professor of Artificial Intelligence at King Fahd University of Petroleum and Minerals. He is founding editor-in-chief of Springer Nature's internationally leading Cognitive Computation journal. He is founding editor-in-chief for two Springer Book Series: Socio-Affective Computing and Cognitive Computation Trends, and also serves on the Editorial Board of a number of other world-leading journals including, as associate editor for the IEEE Transactions on Neural Networks and Learning Systems, IEEE Transactions on Systems, Man, and Cybernetics (Systems) and the IEEE Computational Intelligence Magazine.

== Key achievements ==
- Prof Hussain has co-authored 3 international patents, more than 400 papers, including 150+ international journal papers, over 12 co-authored Books/monographs and over 70 Book chapters to-date (Jan 2020).
- He is the founding editor-in-chief of two internationally leading journals: Springer's Cognitive Computation (ISI SCI Impact Factor (IF): 4.29) and BMC Big Data Analytics. He serves on editorial boards of several other world-leading journals in his field, including the IEEE Transactions on Neural Networks and Learning Systems (IF: 11.7), IEEE Transactions on Emerging Topics in Computational Intelligence, IEEE Computational Intelligence Magazine (IF: 6.6), (Elsevier) Information Fusion (IF 10.7) and Frontiers in Human Neuroscience (top cited journal in Psychology, with IF: 3.2).
- In 2017-18, in independent surveys published in leading journals () including in Elsevier's Information Processing Management journal, Prof Amir Hussain and his collaborator (and former PhD student), Dr Erik Cambria, were ranked as the world's top two most productive/influential researchers in the field of Sentiment Analysis (since 2000).
- His works on biologically inspired, multi-modal sentiment and opinion mining are amongst the most highly cited papers in the field. For example, his paper with Poria S, Cambria E, Howard N, and Huang G-B, on "Fusing audio, visual and textual clues for sentiment analysis from multimodal content", published in (Elsevier) Neurocomputing 174: 50-59 (2016), is an ISI highly cited paper.
- His pioneering research on Sentic Computing (natural language 'concept'-based sentiment and emotion analysis), was awarded the top “4* (Outstanding)” (industrial) Impact evaluation by UK Government's REF2014 exercise. It was also awarded the Best Performing Approach Award for 'Semantic Parsing' Task at the joint-industry & academic-led 'Concept-Level Sentiment Analysis Challenge (SemWebEval)', organized as part of the 11th Extended Semantic Web Conference (ESWC), Greece.
- He is general co-chair of the IEEE World Congress on Computational Intelligence (IEEE WCCI'2020) being held in Glasgow, 19–25 July 2020 http://wcci2020.org - WCCI is the world's largest and top-ranked scientific event on computational intelligence (attended by ~2,000 delegates from academia and industry), organized by the IEEE Computational Intelligence Society (CIS). He is vice-chair of the IEEE CIS Technical Committee on Emerging Topics in CI.

== Research ==
Prof Hussain's personal and collaborative research mainly centres around developing and applying novel cognitively-inspired multi-modal computational intelligence and machine learning techniques to a range of complex real-world applications. More generally, he is interested in novel cross-disciplinary research for brain-inspired modelling, analysis and control for engineering the complex systems of tomorrow – both theory and applications.

He has co-authored 3 international patents, more than 320 papers, including 120+ international journal papers, over 12 co-authored Books/monographs and over 70 Book chapters to-date (March 2018). He has published in leading high impact journals including, amongst others: IEEE Transactions on Neural Networks and Learning Systems, IEEE Transactions on Cybernetics, IEEE Intelligent Systems, IEEE Computational Intelligence, IEEE Transactions on Communications, IEEE Communications Magazine, IEEE Sensors Journal, Neural Networks, Knowledge Based Systems (KBS), IET Proceedings on Vision, Image & Signal Processing, Neurocomputing, Speech Communication, (IET) Electronics Letters, Journal of Theoretical Biology, and others.

== Selected works ==
=== Selected books ===
- Cambria E, Hussain A Sentic Computing: A Common-Sense-Based Framework for Concept Level Sentiment Analysis, Springer Book Series on Socio-Affective Computing
- Abel A, Hussain Cognitively Inspired Audiovisual Speech Filtering: Towards an Intelligent, Fuzzy Based, Multimodal, Two-Stage Speech Enhancement System
- Cambria E, Hussain A, Sentic Computing: Techniques, Tools and Applications

=== Selected, recent research articles ===
- Xiong F, Sun B, Yang X, Qiao H, Huang K, Hussain A, Liu Z: "Guided Policy Search for Sequential Multitask Learning", in IEEE Transactions on Systems, Man, and Cybernetics: Systems, 49(1): 216-226 (2019) (doi: 10.1109/TSMC.2018.2800040) (SCI Impact Factor (IF): 7.35)
- Zhang L, Liu Z, Zhang S, Yang X, Qiao H, Huang K, Hussain A, "Cross-modality interactive attention network for multispectral pedestrian detection", (Elsevier) Information Fusion, Vol.50, pp. 20–29 (2019)(https://doi.org/10.1016/j.inffus.2018.09.015)
- Ieracitano C, Adeel A, Morabito F C, Hussain A, "A novel statistical analysis and autoencoder driven Intelligent intrusion detection approach", (Elsevier) Neurocomputing, in press, (2019) (https://doi.org/10.1016/j.neucom.2019.11.016)
- Mahmud M, Kaiser M S, Hussain A and Vassanelli S, "Applications of Deep Learning and Reinforcement Learning to Biological Data," in IEEE Transactions on Neural Networks and Learning Systems, vol. PP, no. 99, pp. 1–17 (2018) (doi: 10.1109/TNNLS.2018.2790388)
- Scardapane S, Van Vaerenbergh S, Hussain A and Uncini A, "Complex-Valued Neural Networks With Nonparametric Activation Functions," in IEEE Transactions on Emerging Topics in Computational Intelligence (2018) (doi: 10.1109/TETCI.2018.2872600)
- Poria S, Cambria E, Bajpai R, Hussain A: A Review of Affective Computing: From Unimodal Analysis to Multimodal Fusion, (Elsevier) Information Fusion, Vol. 37, pp. 98–125 (2017)
- Poria S, Cambria E, Howard N, Huang G-B, Hussain A: Fusing audio, visual and textual clues for sentiment analysis from multimodal content. (Elsevier) Neurocomputing 174: 50-59 (2016)
- Hussain, A., Cambria, E., Schuller, B., Howard, N. (2014). Affective Neural Networks and Cognitive Learning Systems for Big Data Analysis, Neural Networks, Special Issue, 58, 1-3.
- Poria S, Gelbukh A, Hussain A, Howard N, Das D and Bandyopadhyay S, "Enhanced SenticNet with Affective Labels for Concept-Based Opinion Mining," in IEEE Intelligent Systems, vol. 28, no. 2, pp. 31–38 (March–April 2013) (doi: 10.1109/MIS.2013.4)
- Cambria E, Livingston A, Hussain A: The Hourglass of emotions In Lecture Notes in Computer Science,(LNCS), Springer-Verlag, Berlin Heidelberg, vol. 7403, 144-157, 2012
- Cambria E, Havasi C, Hussain A: SenticNet 2: A Semantic and Affective Resource for Opinion Mining and Sentiment Analysis. In Proceedings of the 25th International Florida Artificial Intelligence Research Society (FLAIRS) Conference, Marco Island, Florida. May 23–25, 2012. AAAI Press, 202-207, 2012
- Poria, S., Agarwal, Basant., Gelbukh, A., Hussain, A., Howard, N. (2014) Dependency-Based Semantic Parsing for Concept-Level Text Analysis. Computational Linguistics and Intelligent Text Processing. Lecture Notes in Computer Science, 8403, 113-127

== International recognition ==
- Founding Editor-in-Chief: Cognitive Computation (Springer Nature Neuroscience, NY, USA - ISI SCI Impact Factor: 4.29)
- Founding Editor-in-Chief of new Open-Access journal: Big Data Analytics (Springer Nature / BioMed Central)
- Associate Editor: IEEE Transactions on Neural Networks & Learning Systems
- Associate Editor: IEEE Computational Intelligence Magazine
- Associate Editor: Information Fusion
- Associate Editor: IEEE Transactions on Emerging Topics in Computational Intelligence
- Editor-in-Chief of new Book Series: SpringerBriefs on Cognitive Computation (Springer Nature)
- Editor-in-Chief of new Book Series: Socio-Affective Computing (Springer Nature)
- IEEE UK & RI Chapter Chair: IEEE UKRI Industry Applications Society Chapter
- Founding Publications co-Chair for INNS Big Data Section and annual 2015 INNS Big Data Conference
- Publications Chair and Organizing Committee member, IEEE IJCNN2015, Killarney, Ireland, July 12–16, 2015
- Founding General Chair: Annual IEEE International Symposium on Computational Intelligence in Healthcare and e-Health (part of the flagship IEEE SSCI Conference)
- Founding General Chair: Annual International Conference on Brain Inspired Cognitive Systems
- General co-Chair of the IEEE World Congress on Computational Intelligence (IEEE WCCI'2020) being held in Glasgow, 19–25 July 2020. WCCI is the world's largest and top ranked international event on computational intelligence, organized by the IEEE Computational Intelligence Society (CIS).
- Vice-Chair of the IEEE CIS Technical Committee on Emerging Topics in CI.
