= Neurocomputing (journal) =

- Discipline: Neural networks, machine learning
- Language: English
- Edited by: Zidong Wang

Publication details
- History: 1989-present
- Publisher: Elsevier
- Frequency: 18/year
- Impact factor: 5.5 (2023)

Standard abbreviations
- ISO 4: Neurocomputing

Indexing
- ISSN: 0925-2312

Links
- Journal homepage; Online access

Neurocomputing is a peer-reviewed scientific journal covering research on artificial intelligence, machine learning, and neural computation. It was established in 1989 and is published by Elsevier. The editor-in-chief is Zidong Wang (Brunel University London). Independent scientometric studies noted that despite being one of the most productive journals in the field, it has kept its reputation across the years intact and plays an important role in leading the research in the area. The journal is abstracted and indexed in Scopus and Science Citation Index Expanded. According to the Journal Citation Reports, its 2023 impact factor is 5.5.
