= IEEE Transactions on Mobile Computing =

- Discipline: Computer science
- Language: English
- Edited by: Ramesh Govindan

Publication details
- History: 2002–present
- Publisher: IEEE Computer Society
- Frequency: Bimonthly
- Impact factor: 7.9 (2022)

Standard abbreviations
- ISO 4: IEEE Trans. Mob. Comput.

Indexing
- CODEN: ITMCCJ
- ISSN: 1536-1233 (print); 1558-0660 (web)
- LCCN: 2001211738

Links
- Journal homepage; Online access

IEEE Transactions on Mobile Computing is a bimonthly peer-reviewed scientific journal covering technology related to the mobility of users, systems, data and computing. It was established in 2002 and is published by the IEEE Computer Society. The editor-in-chief is Marwan M. Krunz (University of Arizona). According to the Journal Citation Reports, the journal has a 2021 impact factor of 6.075.
