= International Journal of Approximate Reasoning =

- Discipline: Artificial intelligence
- Language: English
- Edited by: Thierry Denoeux

Publication details
- History: 1987–present
- Publisher: Elsevier
- Frequency: Monthly
- Impact factor: 3.816 (2020)

Standard abbreviations
- ISO 4: Int. J. Approx. Reason.
- MathSciNet: Internat. J. Approx. Reason.

Indexing
- ISSN: 0888-613X (print); 1873-4731 (web)

Links
- Journal homepage

The International Journal of Approximate Reasoning is a monthly peer-reviewed scientific journal in artificial intelligence. It was established in 1987 by Jim Bezdek and is published by Elsevier, with Thierry Denoeux as its editor-in-chief.
