= Andrew W. Moore =

British-American computer scientist

- Born: Andrew William Moore; Bournemouth, England
- Education: University of Cambridge (BA, PhD)
- Known for: Auton Lab; Prioritized sweeping; Parti-game algorithm; Google Cloud AI
- Awards: Fellow, Association for the Advancement of Artificial Intelligence (2005)
- Scientific career
- Fields: Machine learning; Artificial intelligence; Robotics; Reinforcement learning; Data mining
- Workplaces: Carnegie Mellon University; Google; Lovelace AI
- Thesis: Efficient Memory-based Learning for Robot Control (1991)
- Doctoral advisor: William F. Clocksin
- Website: www.cs.cmu.edu/~awm/

Andrew William Moore is a British-American computer scientist whose research spans machine learning, artificial intelligence, robotics, and large-scale statistical data mining. He is the co-founder and CEO of Lovelace AI, a Pittsburgh-based technology company. Moore previously served as Dean of the Carnegie Mellon School of Computer Science from 2014 to 2018 and held senior roles at Google, including leading Google Cloud AI. In 2023, he was appointed the first adviser for artificial intelligence, robotics, and cloud computing to the United States Central Command.

== Early life and education ==
=== Early life ===
Moore grew up in Bournemouth, on the south coast of England. During his childhood in Bournemouth, he developed an early interest in computing by writing video games for 6502-based personal computers, including the Tangerine Microtan 65.

=== Education ===
Moore studied mathematics and computer science at the University of Cambridge, where he subsequently completed his doctorate. His 1991 thesis, titled Efficient Memory-based Learning for Robot Control, was supervised by William F. Clocksin and examined machine learning techniques applied to robot control. Following his doctorate, Moore held a postdoctoral position at the Massachusetts Institute of Technology (MIT) in Chris Atkeson's Robot Learning group, where his work included research on robot juggling, manipulation, and the application of non-parametric regression to tasks such as pool playing. Before beginning his graduate studies, Moore spent a year as a researcher at Hewlett-Packard Research Labs in Bristol, England.

== Career ==
=== Carnegie Mellon University faculty (1993–2006) ===
Moore joined the Carnegie Mellon University faculty in 1993 as an assistant professor in machine learning, reinforcement learning, manufacturing, and non-parametric regression. He received tenure in 2000 and held appointments in the Computer Science Department, the Machine Learning Department, and the Robotics Institute. He founded the Auton Laboratory, which focused on large-scale statistical methods, and co-founded a consultancy applying statistical data mining to manufacturing problems. He left Carnegie Mellon in 2006 to join Google.

=== Google (2006–2014) ===
Moore joined Google in 2006 as the founding director of its Pittsburgh engineering office, sited on the Carnegie Mellon campus, which grew to employ hundreds of people. In October 2011, while continuing to lead the Pittsburgh office, he was named vice president of engineering for Google Commerce. He left in August 2014 to return to Carnegie Mellon.

=== Dean of Carnegie Mellon School of Computer Science (2014–2018) ===
Moore was appointed Dean of the Carnegie Mellon School of Computer Science in April 2014, succeeding Randal Bryant, who had held the role since 2004, and took up the position in August of that year. New undergraduate degrees were introduced in computational biology and artificial intelligence, and outreach programs were established for K–12 students and underrepresented minorities in computing. In 2017, Moore established the CMU AI initiative, which drew together more than 200 faculty members from across the university to work on machine learning, robotics, natural language processing, and the societal implications of AI. Moore stepped down as dean in August 2018, with his departure effective at the end of the year. CMU President Farnam Jahanian noted his contributions to the school's engagement with technology's societal implications and to Pittsburgh's standing as a center for computing research.

=== Google Cloud AI (2018–2023) ===
In September 2018, Google announced that Moore would lead Google Cloud AI, succeeding Fei-Fei Li, who returned to academia. He began in an advisory capacity before taking on the full-time role in January 2019. He held the position until 2023.

=== Lovelace AI (2023–present) ===
Moore co-founded Lovelace AI in 2023 and serves as its CEO. The company, based in Pittsburgh's Bakery Square neighborhood, develops AI systems for high-stakes analytical work at the intersection of national security, financial services, defense, and disaster response. In May 2025, the company closed a seed round of $16.2 million led by RRE Ventures.

== Government and advisory work ==
=== United States Central Command ===
In April 2023, Moore was appointed the first adviser for artificial intelligence, robotics, and cloud computing to the United States Central Command (CENTCOM). In the role, Moore assisted CENTCOM on the adoption of AI, data collection and structuring, computer algorithms, and network-related efforts.

=== Dropbox Board of Directors ===
In December 2023, Moore was appointed to the Dropbox Board of Directors. Dropbox cited his expertise in AI, machine learning, and robotics, noting that his experience building AI-powered products would offer perspective as the company invested in AI across its product portfolio and through Dropbox Ventures.

== Research ==
=== Statistical machine learning and big data ===
Moore's research has focused on statistical machine learning and the application of computational statistics to big data, emphasizing efficient algorithms capable of handling massive datasets to uncover patterns and extract meaningful information. His work applies statistical methods and mathematical formulations to large volumes of data from diverse sources, including web searches, astronomy, and medical records, enabling the identification of subtle patterns and the derivation of actionable insights. A key aspect of Moore's contributions lies in developing scalable techniques for statistical data mining and computational statistics, particularly through the founding of the Auton Lab at Carnegie Mellon University in 1993. The lab has pioneered methods for performing large-scale statistical operations efficiently, often achieving improvements over prior state-of-the-art performance by several orders of magnitude. These advances have supported applications in areas such as Bayesian networks, data mining, medical informatics, and social network analysis. Moore has advanced non-parametric regression and related techniques, including kernel methods and locally weighted learning, which provide flexible modeling without rigid parametric assumptions and are well-suited to complex, high-dimensional data. His research also encompasses density estimation, Gaussian mixture models, and probabilistic frameworks for large-scale inference. To disseminate knowledge in these fields, Moore created extensive online tutorials covering foundational and advanced topics in statistical machine learning and big data. These include probability and density estimation, Bayesian networks (with coverage of inference, structure learning, and naive Bayes classifiers), non-parametric methods such as instance-based learning, and efficient algorithms for tasks like clustering and regression. These resources have been widely accessed and used in education and practice. As of early 2025, Moore's work has been cited over 48,700 times according to Google Scholar, making him one of the most-cited researchers in machine learning and artificial intelligence.

=== Robotics and reinforcement learning ===
Moore's contributions to robotics and reinforcement learning began during his doctoral studies at the University of Cambridge, where he focused on efficient machine learning methods for robot control. In his 1991 PhD thesis, Efficient Memory-based Learning for Robot Control, Moore developed memory-based techniques that allowed robots to learn control policies directly from sensory data and experience, emphasizing fast, instance-based generalization over parametric models. These methods were demonstrated through experiments including simulated robot juggling tasks, where the system learned to maintain stable ball manipulation with relatively few trials. After joining Carnegie Mellon University, Moore advanced reinforcement learning techniques tailored to the challenges of robotic systems, such as high-dimensional state spaces and real-time constraints. In 1993, he co-authored "Prioritized Sweeping: Reinforcement Learning with Less Data and Less Time" with Christopher G. Atkeson, introducing an efficient model-based approach that prioritizes updates to state values with the largest expected change, significantly reducing the number of required interactions and computations compared to standard methods. Moore further addressed scalability in complex environments through variable resolution reinforcement learning. His 1994 paper "Variable Resolution Reinforcement Learning" presented the parti-game algorithm, which adaptively partitions state space using kd-trees and incorporates a continuity assumption to minimize unnecessary exploration. The method was validated on robotic tasks, including navigation of a 9-joint snakelike manipulator around obstacles and control of a puck on a non-linear bumpy surface.

=== Auton Laboratory ===
The Auton Laboratory was founded by Moore in 1993 at Carnegie Mellon University. Moore has served as a founder and director of the lab, which is co-directed by Artur Dubrawski and Jeff Schneider. The lab develops efficient algorithms, intelligent data structures, and learning methods for large-scale statistical operations in machine learning and statistical data mining. It emphasizes practical, scalable approaches to detecting patterns in massive datasets while addressing real-world constraints in AI trustworthiness, interpretability, and data readiness. The Auton Lab has grown into one of the largest applied machine learning research groups in academia and has produced work deployed across commercial, university, and government settings. Its algorithms and systems have been applied through collaborations with government agencies including the CDC, the USDA, and the Allegheny County Health Department on initiatives such as monitoring food-borne illness outbreaks, forecasting COVID-19 spread via wastewater analysis, and radiological nuclear threat evaluation. The lab has also partnered with industrial research groups, supported predictive maintenance in safety-critical systems, and spun out concepts into successful startups. Its contributions include anomaly detection and biosurveillance techniques applied in public health and security contexts.

=== Notable applications and projects ===
Moore's work through the Auton Lab has produced several high-impact real-world applications of statistical machine learning and data mining techniques. In astronomy, Auton Lab algorithms enabled efficient detection of asteroids in the Pan-STARRS telescope project, processing tens of billions of noisy data points to identify potential threats from near-Earth objects. In biosurveillance and public health, the lab developed anomaly detection systems for DARPA programs and contributed spatial scan algorithms to the Real-time Outbreak and Disease Surveillance (RODS) system, which monitored hospital admissions and national retail data to detect disease outbreaks. These tools also supported homeland security efforts by enabling tractable searches over trillions of spatial regions daily for anomaly detection.

== Personal life ==
=== Citizenship ===
Moore is a naturalized United States citizen, having become a U.S. citizen in 2003.

=== Residence ===
Moore resides in Pittsburgh, Pennsylvania.

== Publications ==
=== Books ===
Wagner, M.M., Moore, A.W., and Aryel, R.M., eds. (2006). The Handbook of Biosurveillance. Academic Press.

=== Selected articles ===
Moore, A.W. and Atkeson, C.G. (1993). "Prioritized Sweeping: Reinforcement Learning with Less Data and Less Real Time." Machine Learning, 13(1): 103–130. Wong, W.K., Moore, A.W., Cooper, G.F., and Wagner, M.M. (2005). "What's Strange About Recent Events (WSARE): An Algorithm for the Early Detection of Disease Outbreaks." Journal of Machine Learning Research, 6: 1961–1998. Liu, T., Moore, A.W., and Gray, A. (2006). "New Algorithms for Efficient High-Dimensional Nonparametric Classification." Journal of Machine Learning Research, 7: 1135–1158. Moore, A.W. (1991). "An Introductory Tutorial on Kd-trees" (from Ph.D. thesis: Efficient Memory-based Learning for Robot Control). University of Cambridge.

== Recognition ==
Moore was elected a Fellow of the Association for the Advancement of Artificial Intelligence in 2005.
