= The International Journal of Advanced Manufacturing Technology =

- Discipline: Engineering
- Language: English
- Edited by: A.Y.C. Nee

Publication details
- History: 1985-present
- Publisher: Springer Science+Business Media
- Frequency: 18/year
- Impact factor: 3.226 (2020)

Standard abbreviations
- ISO 4: Int. J. Adv. Manuf. Technol.

Indexing
- ISSN: 0268-3768 (print); 1433-3015 (web)
- OCLC no.: 43068796

Links
- Journal homepage; Online archive

The International Journal of Advanced Manufacturing Technology is a peer-reviewed scientific journal published by Springer Science+Business Media in 18 issues per year. It covers all aspects of advanced manufacturing technology, such as robotics, artificial intelligence (including speech technology), vision and tactile sensing, grippers, programmable controllers, lasers and other advanced processes, programmable assembly, flexible manufacturing systems, computer integrated manufacturing, inspection, automatic test equipment, simulation, motors, controls and drives, local area networking, production planning and control, logistics and supply chain management, human factors, and economics. The editor-in-chief is A.Y.C. Nee (National University of Singapore).

== Abstracting and indexing ==
The journal is abstracted and indexed in EBSCO databases, Science Citation Index Expanded, and Scopus. According to the Journal Citation Reports, the journal has a 2017 impact factor of 2.601.
