= Humanoids Summit =

Annual robotic technology conferencen

- Status: Active
- Genre: AI and Robotics technology
- Venue: Computer History Museum
- Location: Mountain View, California
- Country: US
- Inaugurated: December 11-12, 2024
- Organizer: Modar Alaoui, ALM Ventures
- Website: humanoidssummit.com

The Humanoids Summit is an annual technology conference dedicated to advancing humanoid robotics. Founded in 2024 by Modar Alaoui and ALM Ventures, the summit aims to accelerate the mass production, commercialization, and investment in humanoid robotic technologies. The inaugural event was held on December 11–12, 2024, at the Computer History Museum in Mountain View, California.

== Background ==
The inaugural Humanoids Summit took place on December 11–12, 2024, at the Computer History Museum in Mountain View, California. The event was organized by ALM Ventures, a venture capital firm led by Modar Alaoui and convened industry leaders, innovators, and investors to discuss advancements in humanoid robotics.

The event aims to accelerate the mass production, commercialization, and capital allocation needed for humanoid robots. The summit features the Humanoid VC Day track, where humanoid ecosystem startups connect with investors. The Humanoids Summit hosted its first European edition in London, UK, on May 29–30, 2025, at Novotel London West. The first two editions, hosted in Silicon Valley and London respectively, drew over 3,000 attendees from more than 80 countries, featured 110 speakers, and showcased more than 100 exhibitors. It also marked the introduction of International Humanoids Day, observed annually on December 12.

=== International Humanoids Day ===
International Humanoids Day is observed annually on December 12. It was established by Modar Alaoui in conjunction with the inaugural Humanoids Summit in 2024. The day is dedicated to raising awareness and fostering global collaboration in the field of humanoid robotics. It aims to promote ethical standards, responsible innovation, and inclusivity in the development and deployment of humanoid robots.

== Future events ==
The third edition of the Humanoids Summit is scheduled to return to the Computer History Museum in Mountain View, California, on December 11–12, 2025, aligning once again with International Humanoids Day on December 12. The fourth edition will take place in Tokyo, Japan, in May 2026.
