= Cognitive Computation =

- Discipline: Computer Science; Artificial intelligence Computational neuroscience
- Language: English
- Edited by: Amir Hussain

Publication details
- History: 2009-present
- Publisher: Springer Science+Business Media
- Frequency: Bimonthly
- Impact factor: 5.418 (2020)

Standard abbreviations
- ISO 4: Cogn. Comput.

Indexing
- ISSN: 1866-9956 (print); 1866-9964 (web)
- OCLC no.: 310751700

Links
- Journal homepage

Cognitive Computation is an international, peer-reviewed scientific journal, interdisciplinary journal that publishes articles describing original basic and applied work involving bio-inspired computational accounts of all aspects of natural and artificial cognitive systems. The journal is published by Springer Science+Business Media.

It provides a platform for the dissemination of research, current practices and future trends in the emerging discipline of cognitive computation that bridges gap between life sciences, social sciences, engineering, physical and mathematical sciences, and humanities.

== Abstracting and indexing ==
The journal is abstracted and indexed in the following databases: Science Citation Index Expanded (SciSearch), Journal Citation Reports/Science Edition, SCOPUS, PsycINFO, Google Scholar, Academic OneFile, Current Contents/Engineering, Computing and Technology, DBLP, EI-Compendex, OCLC, SCImago, Summon by Serial Solutions, Neuroscience Citation Index

According to the Journal Citation Reports, the journal had a 2020 impact factor of 5.418.
