= Journal of Intelligent and Robotic Systems =

- Discipline: Robotics
- Language: English
- Edited by: Kimon P. Valavanis

Publication details
- History: 1988-present
- Publisher: Springer Science+Business Media
- Frequency: Monthly
- Impact factor: 3.3 (2022)

Standard abbreviations
- ISO 4: J. Intell. Robot. Syst.

Indexing
- CODEN: JIRSES
- ISSN: 0921-0296 (print); 1573-0409 (web)
- LCCN: 88659214
- OCLC no.: 38095195

Links
- Journal homepage

The Journal of Intelligent and Robotic Systems is a monthly peer-reviewed scientific journal that covers theory and practice in all areas of intelligent systemss and robotics. It is published by Springer Science+Business Media and the editor-in-chief is Kimon P. Valavanis (University of Denver).

== Abstracting and indexing ==
The journal is abstracted and indexed in PsycINFO, Science Citation Index Expanded, and Scopus. According to the Journal Citation Reports, the journal has a 2022 impact factor of 3.3. The founding editor-in-chief was Spyros G. Tzafestas, who continued his editorship until his retirement in 2006.

== See also ==
- List of robotics journals
