= IEEE Transactions on Robotics =

- Discipline: Robotics
- Language: English
- Edited by: Wolfram Burgard

Publication details
- Former names: IEEE Journal on Robotics and Automation, IEEE Transactions on Robotics and Automation
- History: 1985–present
- Publisher: IEEE
- Frequency: Bimonthly
- Open access: Hybrid
- Impact factor: 11.1 (2025)

Standard abbreviations
- ISO 4: IEEE Trans. Robot.

Indexing
- ISSN: 1552-3098 (print); 1941-0468 (web)
- LCCN: 2004242138
- OCLC no.: 56202666

Links
- Journal homepage; Online archive

IEEE Transactions on Robotics is a bimonthly peer-reviewed scientific journal published by the Institute of Electrical and Electronics Engineers (IEEE). It covers all aspects of robotics and is sponsored by the IEEE Robotics and Automation Society. The editor-in-chief is Wolfram Burgard.

== Publication history ==
The journal was established in 1985 as the IEEE Journal on Robotics and Automation, but changed name in 1989 to IEEE Transactions on Robotics and Automation. In 2004 the journal split into IEEE Transactions on Automation Science and Engineering and IEEE Transactions on Robotics.

== Abstracting and indexing ==
The journal is abstracted and indexed in:

- Science Citation Index Expanded
- Scopus

According to the Journal Citation Reports, the journal has a 2025 impact factor of 11.1, ranking it 4th out of 46 journals in the category "Robotics"

== See also ==
- List of robotics journals
