= Yoram Koren =

Israeli-American engineering academic

- יורם קורן
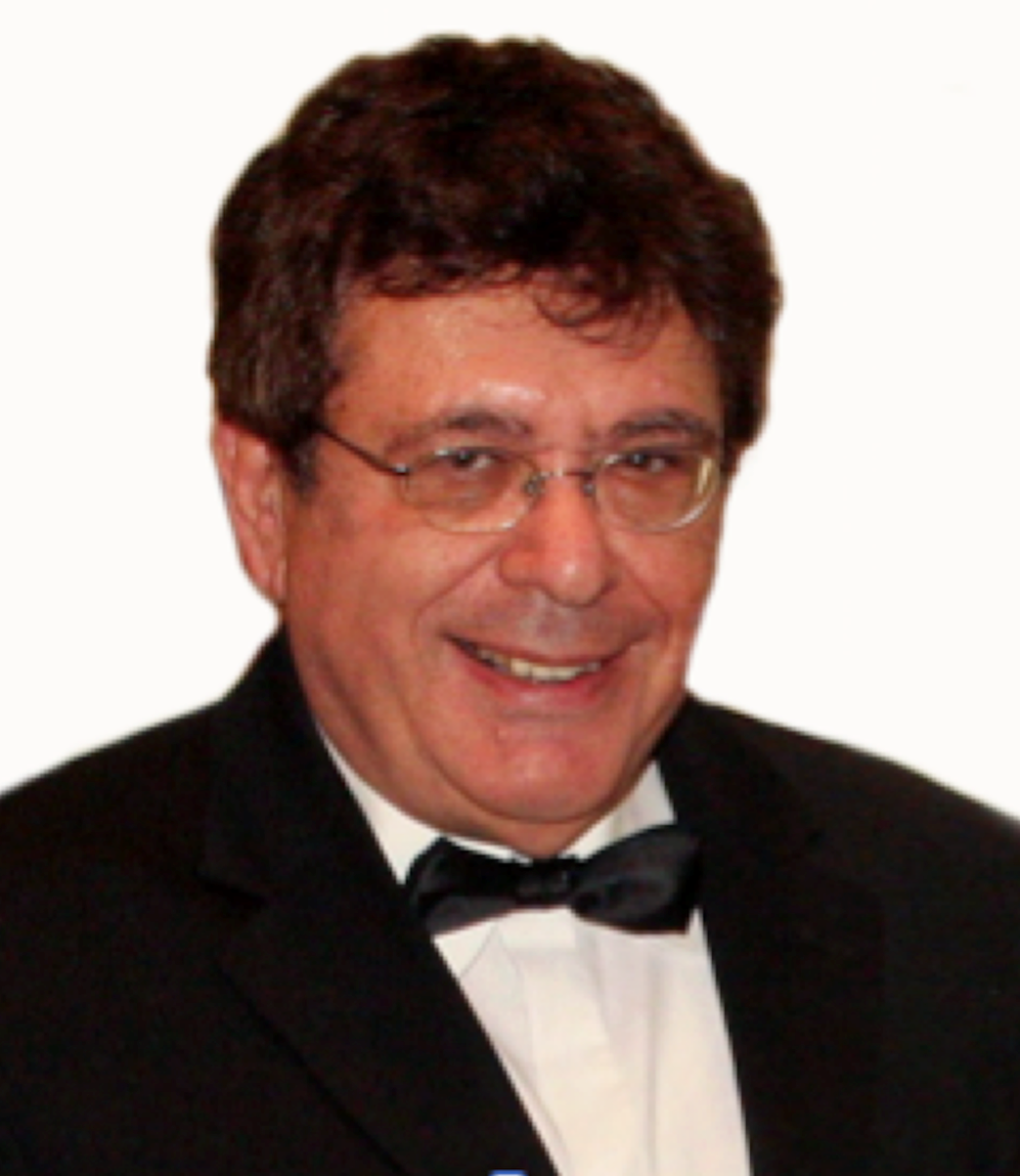
- Known for: Reconfigurable Manufacturing System; CNC and Adaptive Control; Mobile Robot
- Scientific career
- Fields: Manufacturing; Robotics
- Workplaces: University of Michigan; Technion – Israel Institute of Technology

Yoram Koren (Hebrew: יורם קורן) is an Israeli-American academic. He is the James J. Duderstadt Distinguished University Professor Emeritus of Manufacturing and the Paul G. Goebel Professor Emeritus of Engineering at the University of Michigan, Ann Arbor. Since 2014 he is a distinguished visiting professor at the Technion – Israel Institute of Technology.

In 2004 Koren was elected to the National Academy of Engineering (NAE) “For contributions to the science, education, and practice of manufacturing through innovations in reconfigurable manufactring systems, robotics, and manufacturing system control". He is also an honorary member of the Society of Manufacturing Engineers (SME). He is a Fellow of the International Academy for Production Engineering (CIRP), the Society of Manufacturing Engineers (SME), the American Society of Mechanical Engineers (ASME), and of the Institute of Electrical and Electronics Engineers (IEEE) "for contributions to flexible automation and manufacturing systems".

== Early life and education ==
Yoram Koren was born in Tel-Aviv, Mandatory Palestine. He studied at Ironi Alef High School in Tel-Aviv and served at the Israeli Air Force as an electronics technician.

He received B.Sc. in Electrical Engineering from the Technion - Israel Institute of Technology, in 1965. His M.Sc. was received from the same department in 1968. He continued his Ph.D. studies in Mechanical Engineering at the Technion and graduated in January 1971. His thesis on "Model and Optimization of a Machining Process and its Control", was supervised by Prof. Ehud Lenz.

== Career ==
Koren started his career at the Technion–Israel Institute of Technology, where he was a lecturer from 1971 to 1973, and a professor from 1975 to 1985. Koren was the head of the Technion Robotics Laboratory from 1982 to 1985. From 1980 to 1982, Koren was on sabbatical and leave of absence at the University of Michigan, where he was the Paul G. Goebel Visiting Professor of Engineering. In 1986 he joined U-M as a tenured professor, and in 1993 he was approved as the Paul G. Goebel Professor of Engineering by the board of regents. In 2010 Koren was named the James J. Duderstadt Distinguished University Professor of Manufacturing.

Koren retired in 2014, becoming a professor emeritus. Since 2015 Koren has been a distinguished visiting professor at Technion, where he was also the Edmond J. Safra Distinguished Visiting Professor Chair in 2007.

Koren is the founding director (in 1996) of the NSF-sponsored Engineering Research Center (ERC) for Reconfigurable Manufacturing Systems (RMS), an ERC that was financially sponsored (at $47 million) by the National Science Foundation and 25 industrial companies until 2012. Under Koren's leadership, 70 Ph.D. students and 270 M.S. graduated from the RMS center.

== Research ==
Koren is a member of the U.S. National Academy of Engineering (NAE) "For contributions to the science, education, and practice of manufacturing through innovations in reconfigurable manufacturing systems, robotics, and manufacturing system control".

Koren holds 18 U.S. patents in these fields. He has published 4 books and more than 310 scholarly papers that have over 40,000 citations, with an h-index of 82 (according to Google Scholar).

=== Flexible Automation and CNC ===
Koren's research in the 1970s was focused on developing methods for the precise control of CNC (computer numerically controlled) machines aimed at enhancing their precision and increasing their productivity. In 1973 Koren invented the first computerized real-time adaptive controller for a milling machine. In 1976 Koren published the first scientific paper on interpolators for CNC machines. In 1980 he published the Cross-Coupled Controller, which coordinates the output of two control loops for enhancing CNC precision by software.

=== Robotics ===
Koren started his robotics research (and mobile robot research in particular) in 1980. Koren and Johann Borenstein developed the autonomous mobile robot CARMEL (Computer-Aided Robotics for Maintenance, Emergency, and Life-support), featured on a CNN national program in 1988. CARMEL's motion algorithms are described in [Papers 9, 10]. In 1992, CARMEL won the first Autonomous Mobile Robot Competition sponsored by the Association for the Advancement of Artificial Intelligence.

In 1991 Koren received a grant of $220,000 to develop "Sensor-Based Control of a Mechanical Snake. Shan and Koren built a 7-link snake; its first link had a camera, and 6 motors were installed at the 6 joints to provide forward motion. Shan and Koren were the first to develop a model of how external objects could affect kinematic constraints on the movement of a snake robot in 1993.

=== Reconfigurable Manufacturing Systems (RMS) ===
Koren is the inventor of the Reconfigurable Machine Tool, the Reconfigurable Manufacturing Systems, and the Reconfigurable Apparatus for Inspection. Koren introduced the RMS structural architecture and its benefits to the international manufacturing research community in 1999. Koren presented at the CIRP Annual Meeting in France the keynote paper "Reconfigurable Manufacturing Systems", defining RMS as: "A manufacturing system that has an adjustable structure that enable rapid system scalability in response to market demands, and system adaptability to new products". He is credited with identifying the basic principles of such systems.

=== Mass-Individualization ===
Koren proposed a new manufacturing system architecture that enables producing Market-of-One products at affordable cost. [Papers 14, 15]. To achieve buyer's satisfaction, proximity between the mass-individualization factory and the customer is required.

== Books ==
- Koren, Y.; Ben-Uri, J. (1978). Numerical Control of Machine Tools. Khanna Publishers.
- Koren, Yoram (1983). Computer control of manufacturing systems. New York: McGraw-Hill. ISBN 978-0-07-035341-1.
- Koren, Yoram (1985). Robotics for engineers. New York: McGraw-Hill. ISBN 978-0-07-035399-2. (This book was also translated by the publisher to Japanese and French)
- Koren, Yoram (2010). The Global Manufacturing Revolution: Product-Process-Business Integration and Reconfigurable Systems (1st ed.). New York, NY: Wiley. ISBN 978-0-470-92080-0. (This book was also translated to Chinese).

== Selected articles ==
=== RMS ===
1. Koren, Y.; Heisel, U.; Jovane, F.; Moriwaki, T.; Pritschow, G.; Ulsoy, G.; Van Brussel, H. (1 January 1999). "Reconfigurable Manufacturing Systems". CIRP Annals. 48 (2): 527–540. doi:10.1016/S0007-8506(07)63232-6. ISSN 0007-8506.
2. Mehrabi, M. G.; Ulsoy, A. G.; Koren, Y. (1 August 2000). "Reconfigurable manufacturing systems: Key to future manufacturing". Journal of Intelligent Manufacturing. 11 (4): 403–419. doi:10.1023/A:1008930403506. hdl:2027.42/46513. ISSN 1572-8145. S2CID 6250362.
3. Koren, Yoram; Shpitalni, Moshe (October 2010). "Design of reconfigurable manufacturing systems" (PDF). Journal of Manufacturing Systems. 29 (4): 130–141. doi:10.1016/J.JMSY.2011.01.001. S2CID 18516443.
4. Koren, Yoram; Gu, Xi; Guo, Weihong (16 March 2018). "Reconfigurable manufacturing systems: Principles, design, and future trends". Frontiers of Mechanical Engineering. 13 (2): 121–136. Bibcode:2018FrME...13..121K. doi:10.1007/s11465-018-0483-0. ISSN 2095-0233. S2CID 255275506.

=== CNC ===
5. Koren, Yoram (January 1976). "Interpolator for a Computer Numerical Control System" (PDF). IEEE Transactions on Computers. C-25 (1): 32–37. doi:10.1109/TC.1976.5009202. S2CID 10286089.
6. Koren, Yoram (1 December 1980). "Cross-Coupled Biaxial Computer Control for Manufacturing Systems". Journal of Dynamic Systems, Measurement, and Control. 102 (4): 265–272. doi:10.1115/1.3149612. ISSN 0022-0434.
7. Lin, Rong-Shine; Koren, Y. (1 February 1996). "Efficient Tool-Path Planning for Machining Free-Form Surfaces". Journal of Engineering for Industry. 118 (1): 20–28. doi:10.1115/1.2803642. ISSN 0022-0817.
8. Koren, Yoram (1 November 1997). "Control of Machine Tools" (PDF). Journal of Manufacturing Science and Engineering. 119 (4B): 749–755. doi:10.1115/1.2836820.

=== Robotics ===
9. Borenstein, J.; Koren, Y. (1991). "The vector field histogram-fast obstacle avoidance for mobile robots" (PDF). IEEE Transactions on Robotics and Automation. 7 (3): 278–288. doi:10.1109/70.88137. S2CID 757244.
10. Koren, Y.; Borenstein, J. (1991). "Potential field methods and their inherent limitations for mobile robot navigation" (PDF). Proceedings. 1991 IEEE International Conference on Robotics and Automation. pp. 1398–1404. doi:10.1109/ROBOT.1991.131810. ISBN 0-8186-2163-X. S2CID 9995682.
11. Shan, Y.; Koren, Y. (1993). "Design and motion planning of a mechanical snake". IEEE Transactions on Systems, Man, and Cybernetics. 23 (4): 1091–1100. doi:10.1109/21.247890.
12. Shoval, S.; Borenstein, J.; Koren, Y. (1998). "The NavBelt-a computerized travel aid for the blind based on mobile robotics technology" (PDF). IEEE Transactions on Biomedical Engineering. 45 (11): 1376–1386. doi:10.1109/10.725334. PMID 9805836. S2CID 7089061.

=== Mass-Individualization ===
13. Koren, Y.; Hu, S.J.; Gu, Peihua; Shpitalni, M. (2013). "Open-architecture products". CIRP Annals. 62 (2): 719–729. doi:10.1016/j.cirp.2013.06.001.
14. Koren, Y.; Shpitalni, M.; Gu, P.; Hu, S.J. (2015). "Product design for mass-individualization". Procedia CIRP. 36: 64–71. doi:10.1016/j.procir.2015.03.050. Archived from the original on 2021-12-08.
15. Koren, Yoram (2021). "The Local Factory of the Future for Producing Individualized Products". The Bridge. 51 (1): 20–26.

== Honors and awards ==
- CIRP Fellow (1985)
- SME Fellow (1987)
- ASME Fellow (1990)
- Member of National Academy of Engineering (2004)
- Hideo Hanasufa Outstanding Investigator Award (2004)
- M. Eugene Merchant Manufacturing Medal of ASME/SME (2006)
- Yoram and Alina Koren Conference Room at the University of Michigan (2012)
- IEEE Life Fellow (2013)
- SME Honorary Member (2015)

== Personal life ==
Yoram is married to Alina (MA in literature) who was a lecturer at the University of Michigan, and they have two children: Shlomy and Esther (who died in October 2020).
