= Zidong Wang =

Zidong Wang from Brunel University London, Uxbridge, UK was named Fellow of the Institute of Electrical and Electronics Engineers (IEEE) in 2014 for contributions to networked control and complex networks.
