= Journal of Artificial Intelligence and Consciousness =

Academic journal

- Discipline: Artificial intelligence, consciousness studies, cognitive science, philosophy of mind
- Language: English
- Edited by: Ryota Kanai

Publication details
- Former name: International Journal of Machine Consciousness
- History: 2009–present
- Publisher: World Scientific
- Frequency: Biannual
- Open access: Hybrid

Standard abbreviations
- ISO 4: J. Artif. Intell. Conscious.

Indexing
- ISSN: 2705-0785 (print); 2705-0793 (web)
- OCLC no.: 1365392331
- International Journal of Machine Consciousness
- ISSN: 1793-8430 (print); 1793-8473 (web)

Links
- Journal homepage; Online access; Online archive

Journal of Artificial Intelligence and Consciousness is a biannual peer-reviewed academic journal covering research on the theoretical and practical aspects of artificial intelligence and its relationship to consciousness, encompassing computational science, psychology, philosophy of mind, ethics, and neuroscience. The journal is published by World Scientific and the editor-in-chief is Ryota Kanai (Araya Research).

The journal was established in 2009 with Antonio Chella (University of Palermo) as founding editor-in-chief, entitled International Journal of Machine Consciousness (volume 1–6, 2009–2014). After a period of inactivity, the journal continued under its current name in 2020 (volume 7).

== Abstracting and indexing ==
The journal is abstracted and indexed in Scopus.
