= International Conference on Robotics and Automation =

Academic conference sponsored by IEEE

- Abbreviation: ICRA
- Discipline: robotics

Publication details
- Publisher: IEEE
- History: 1984-present
- Frequency: annual

The IEEE International Conference on Robotics and Automation (ICRA) is an annual academic conference covering advances in robotics. It is one of the premier conferences in its field, alongside the International Conference on Intelligent Robots and Systems (IROS), with an 'A' rating from the Australian Ranking of ICT Conferences obtained in 2010 and an 'A1' rating from the Brazilian ministry of education in 2012.

The 2025 IEEE International Conference on Robotics and Automation (ICRA 2025) is held from May 19th to 23rd, 2025, in Atlanta, USA. ICRA 2025 gathers the world's top researchers and industry leaders to share ideas, exchange knowledge, and advance the field of robotics for the benefit of humanity.
