= The International Journal of Robotics Research =

- Discipline: Robotics
- Language: English
- Edited by: Antonio Bicchi

Publication details
- History: 1982-present
- Publisher: SAGE Publications
- Frequency: 14/year
- Impact factor: 2.503 (2013)

Standard abbreviations
- ISO 4: Int. J. Robot. Res.

Indexing
- ISSN: 0278-3649 (print); 1741-3176 (web)
- LCCN: 82647259
- OCLC no.: 640842819

Links
- Journal homepage; Online access; Online archive

The International Journal of Robotics Research is a peer-reviewed scientific journal that covers the field of robotics on topics from sensors and sensory interpretations to kinematics in motion planning. Its editor-in-chief is Antonio Bicchi (University of Pisa). The journal was established in 1982 and is published by SAGE Publications.

== Abstracting and indexing ==
The journal is abstracted and indexed in Scopus and the Science Citation Index. According to the Journal Citation Reports, its 2013 impact factor is 2.503, ranking it 3rd out of 21 journals in the category "Robotics".

== See also ==
- List of robotics journals
