= Istituto Italiano di Tecnologia =

Italian high tech research centre

Italian Institute of Technology

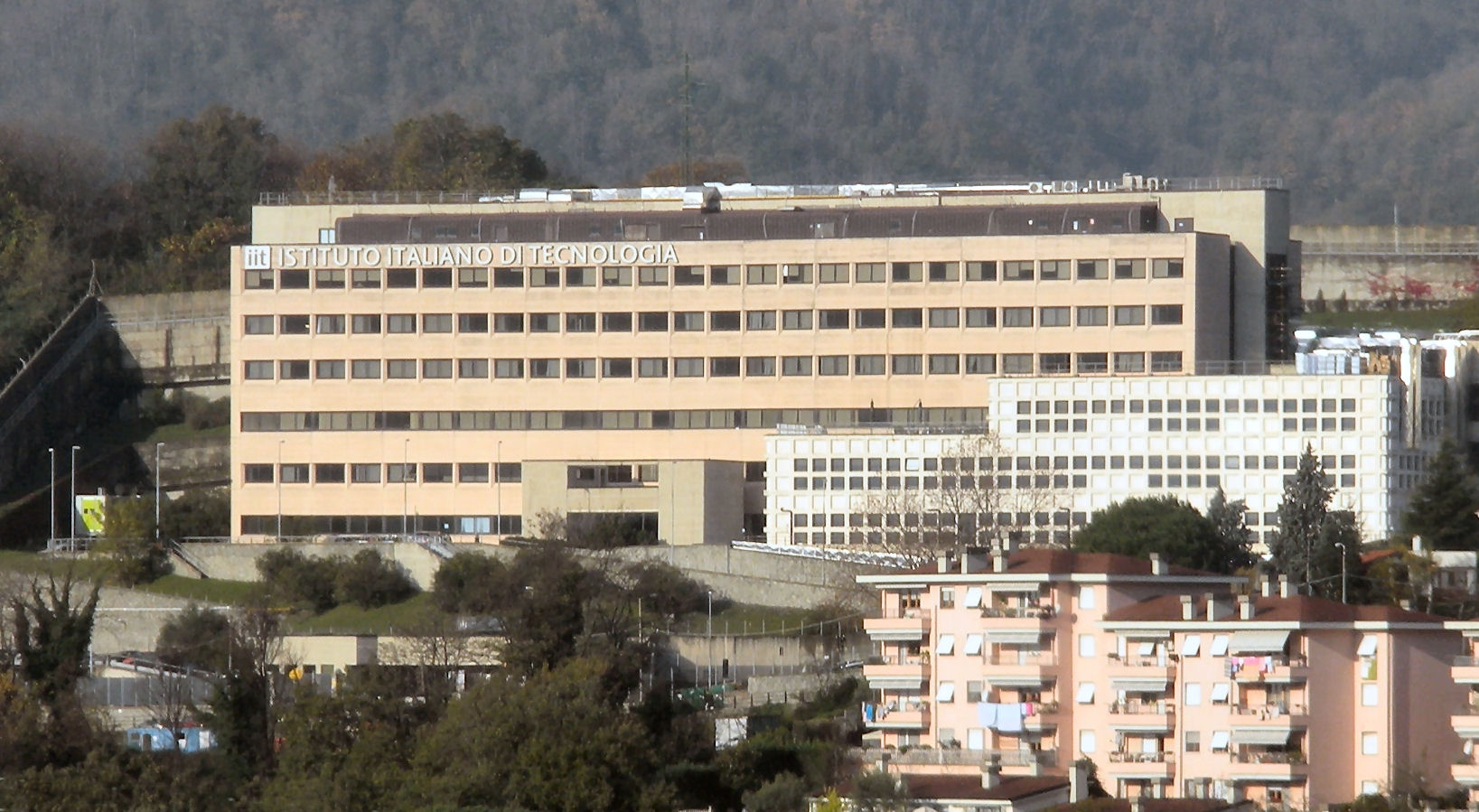
- Abbreviation: IIT
- Formation: October 2005; 21 years ago
- Type: governmental organisation
- Purpose: application-oriented scientific research
- Headquarters: Genoa, Italy, EU
- Location: Genoa, Arnesano, Ferrara, Milan, Turin, Parma, Pisa, Pontedera, Naples, Rome, Rovereto, Boston
- Coordinates: 44.4749°N 8.9062°E
- Fields: robotics, nanotechnology, and others
- Official language: British English, Italian
- Scientific Director - General Director: Giorgio Metta - Gianmarco Montanari
- Main organ: Istituto Italiano di Tecnologia
- Budget: ~ €90 million per year
- Staff: ~ 1,900
- Website: www.iit.it

The Istituto Italiano di Tecnologia (IIT) (in English: Italian Institute of Technology) is a scientific research centre based in Genoa (Italy, EU). Its main goal is the advancement of science, in Italy and worldwide, through projects and discoveries oriented to applications and technology. Some account IIT as the best Italian scientific research centre.

In June 2016, the science journal Nature named Italian Institute of Technology among the list of the top 100 rising stars scientific institutes in the world, that is the ranking of the top 100 institutions which most improved their publication quality scores in the Nature index between 2012 and 2015, on world basis.

In November 2016, the Nature Index database named IIT among the list of the top 100 scientific centres running successful international collaborations, on world basis.

In February 2017, the scientific evaluation agency Anvur of Italy's Ministry of Education evaluated and ranked the Italian Institute of Technology as the top national scientific research centre for computer science-mathematics, biology, industrial engineering, psychology, and as the second national top for physics.

== Structure and scientific sectors ==
IIT was established by Italian government in 2003, and it started to work in October 2005. It receives around €90 million per year from the Italian Government. The founders decided to create it in Genoa because of the presence of the branches of important hi-tech companies such as Siemens, Ericsson, and Ansaldo STS.

Differently from other scientific institutes such as universities or Italian National Research Council (CNR), its scientific research fields are limited to few sectors. These scientific areas include:

- robotics
- drug discovery
- neuroscience
- nanotechnology
- computer vision
- optical microscopy

IIT mainly collaborates to the local University of Genoa, and also has other affiliated research centres (twelve in Italy and two in Boston, United States).

=== Future expansions ===
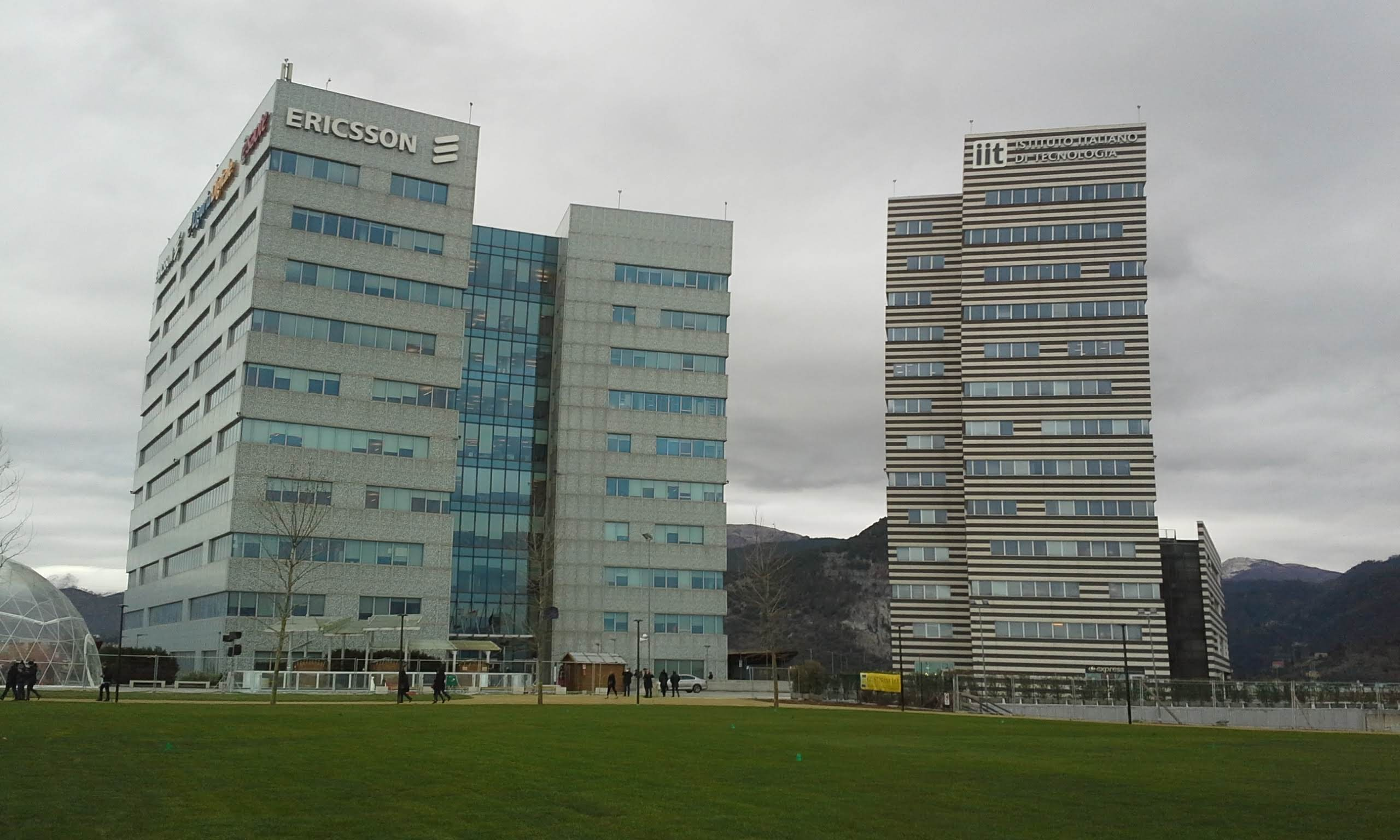
The Great Campus science technology park of Genoa Erzelli, Italy (December 2018)

IIT is currently constructing a new scientific centre, called Center for Human Technologies, in the GREAT Campus scientific technology park in Genoa Erzelli.

The first IIT laboratory in the Genoa Erzelli park opened in November 2016 and is part of the robotics department. Additional novel IIT laboratories were established and inaugurated in July 2019; for these new scientific laboratories, the institute plans to recruit approximately 300 new researchers.

The new research facilities will be dedicated to robotics, motion perception, neuroscience, human-robot interaction, computational statistics, neurogenomics, neurodiagnostics, and other scientific areas.

=== H4E – Hub For Entrepreneurship ===
On 13 June 2023, H4E – Hub For Entrepreneurship was inaugurated in the Erzelli headquarters.

== Delivered applications ==
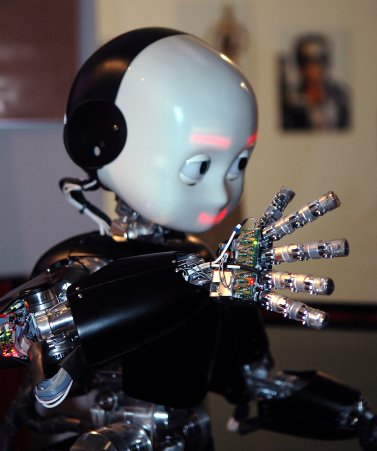
iCub making facial expressions

One of the main goals of IIT is to carry on projects able to produce real-life applications. Therefore, scientific projects are not oriented to reach theoretical discoveries, but rather to deliver new technologies in robotics and nanotechnology.

The Italian Institute of Technology developed the humanoid robot iCub. IIT dedicates a complete facility to the study and the development of this robot.

In 2014, IIT released BlindPad, an electronic device for blind people, developed by IIT researchers in collaboration with Istituto David Chiossone in Genoa.

In 2015, the Italian Institute of Technology produced a robotics application for an artificial hand, a prosthesis able to replace a missing human arm.

In June 2015, another of IIT's robot named Walkman, participated to the pre-eminent DARPA Robotics Challenge, in Los Angeles (USA).

In 2016, the Italian Institute of Technology won the robotics grasping challenge at the IEEE/RJS International Conference On Intelligent Robots and Systems (IROS 2016) in South Korea.

In 2017, IIT and Momodesign released a motorcycle helmet made of graphene.

In May 2020, Ferrari chairman John Elkann announced that Ferrari and the Italian Institute of Technology had jointly developed the FI5, a low-cost pulmonary ventilator for hospitals during the COVID-19 emergency.

== Scientific plans ==
The Scientific Plan 2009–2011 aims at developing the results of the start-up and sets a general framework which combines the integration and the reinforcement of the departments, the national network and the research platforms.

The Scientific Plan 2009–2011 is the evolution of the 2005–2008 plan, which was dealing with a large scale program on Humanoid Robotics. According to the 2005–2008 strategic plan, the Humanoid Robotics program had a strong interdisciplinary character, merging human and humanoid technologies through the development of 3 technology platforms: Robotics, Neuroscience and Drug Discovery and Development (D3), supported by a few facilities for nano-biotechnologies (such as material science, nanofabrication, chemistry and biochemistry, electron microscopy laboratories etc.). Each platform was meant to develop specific topics/tasks in different IIT research units, such as the Departments built in Genoa, or, in some cases, the external research units forming the multidisciplinary research network of IIT country-wide.

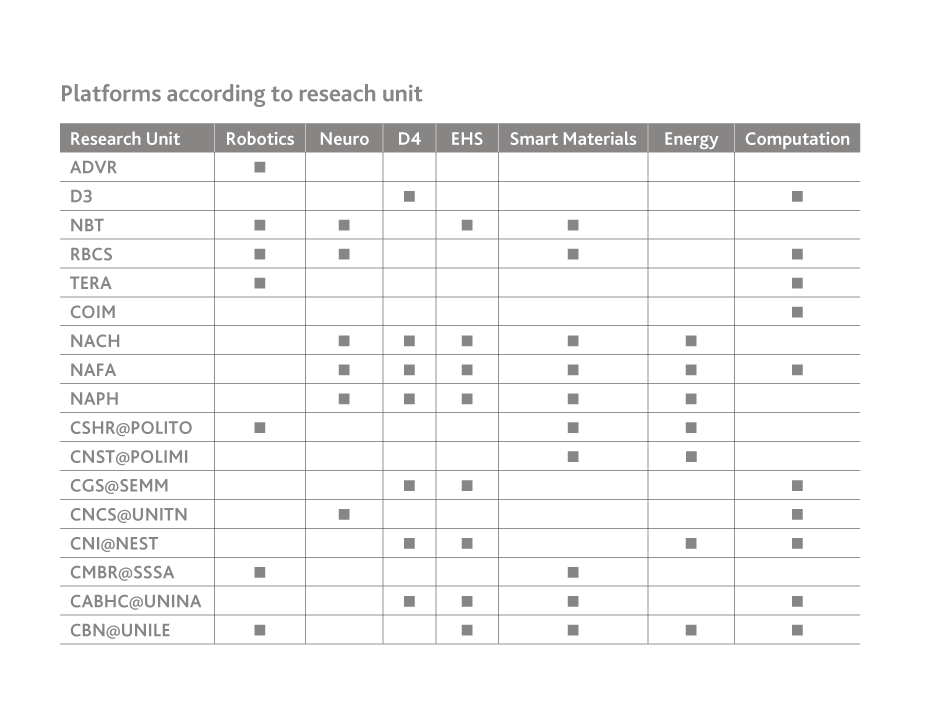
Platform-grid

To date the research infrastructure of IIT in Genoa has been completed. It consists of more than 500 staff from 30 countries, operating in a 25000 sqm facility equipped with laboratories distributed over three Robotics departments (Robotics, Brain and Cognitive Sciences; Advanced Robotics; TeleRobotics and Applications) and two life-science oriented departments (Neuroscience and Brain Technologies, and Drug Discovery and Development, D3), and a few shared facilities including nanofabrication clean room, material science lab, chemistry lab, biochemistry lab, animal facility, electron microscopy, mechanical and electronic workshops. The growth of the Humanoid Robotic program at IIT is witnessed by the exceptional development of the iCub robot (see the movie below), the way of engineering, the neuroscience, and the material science know-how existing at the Institute.

The new strategic plan 2009–2011 aims at consolidating the capabilities accomplished by IIT in the start-up phase, by developing a few new platforms instrumental to the evolution of the Humanoid Robotic program, meanwhile providing new opportunities to foster technological solutions useful in many fields of everyday life. The new platforms represent the natural evolution of the existing ones, and they originate from the idea of making iCub closer and closer to a human, namely: to power the robot with portable, high efficiency energy sources, to develop smart materials with biomimetic characteristics, to investigate the interaction between artificial nanosystems and biological entities (such as cells) in view of future interconnections but also to assess safety issues. These activities, will be supported by an integrated multiscale computation activity. Though each one the above topics have their own rationale and field of application, their combination and synergic development within the humanoid robotic program is the great challenge of the 2009–2011 strategic plan of IIT. With reference to the scheme above, the 2009–2011 strategic plan prioritised technological platforms can be identified as:

1. Energy: portable energy sources, plastic solar cells, energy harvesting, energy storage, energy scavenging, fuel cell technologies (descending from the Robotics platform. Relevant to self-powered technologies);
2. EHS (Environment, Health, Security): interaction of nanosystems with biological entities, in pharmacology, therapies, and any other human environment (descending from the Neuroscience platform, the Drug Discovery and Development platform and from the nanobiotech facilities. Relevant for future safety standards at nanoscale currently targeted by all advanced countries, and of great relevance for quality assessment in many fields such as new materials, environment, pharmacology, food and agriculture, new security standards for living creatures and human environment in the presence of nanosystems);
3. Smart Materials: lightweight nanocomposites, intelligent biocompatible surfaces, interface living systems/inorganic systems, textile/fiber engineering (descending from the Robotics platform and the nanobiotech facilities. Relevant for future non-metallic robots, for environmentally friendly materials, biocompatible materials, new generation sensors, etc.)
4. 4D (Diagnostic, Drug-Delivery Development): this is an extension and a completion of the existing drug discovery development platform (pursued by the D3 department) . In addition to the D3 activities, advanced diagnostic tools such as chip for genomic and proteomic analysis, multifunctional magnetic/fluorescent nanoprobes, nanocarrier for in vivo drug delivery, nanospectroscopies will be developed.
5. Integrated Multiscale Computational Technology: developing advanced modeling of complex systems of interest to the above platforms.

The implementation of the scientific program outlined so far will require the following actions:

1. Empowerment of the shared laboratories, consolidating the interdisciplinary facilities in the following structures:
2. Creation of eight IIT centers established nationwide:
3. Launch of exploratory research programs (Seed projects) in collaboration with other research Institutions.

== See also ==
- Genoa
- Genoa Erzelli GREAT Campus
- University of Genoa
- Liguria
- iCub
- DARPA Robotics Challenge
- Istituto Italiano per l'Intelligenza Artificiale nell'Industria (AI4I)
- Artificial Intelligence Exposition | C1A0 EXPO in Genoa
