= International Conference on Intelligent Robots and Systems =

Annual academic conference

- Abbreviation: IROS
- Discipline: robotics

Publication details
- Publisher: IEEE
- History: 1988-present
- Frequency: annual

IROS, the IEEE/RSJ International Conference on Intelligent Robots and Systems, is an annual academic conference covering advances in robotics. It is one of the premier conferences of its field (alongside ICRA, International Conference on Robotics and Automation) with an 'A' rating from the Australian Ranking of ICT Conferences obtained in 2010 and an 'A1' rating from the Brazilian ministry of education in 2012.

The acceptance rate can vary substantially (for example, it has been 32% in 2011 and 39% in 2012) and IROS typically receives more than 2000 paper submissions (for example, 790 out of 2459 submitted papers have been accepted for IROS 2011).

== Conferences ==
- 1st, IROS 1988, Tokyo, Japan (at Tokyo University of Science)
- 2nd, IROS 1989, Tsukuba, Japan
- 3rd, IROS 1990, Tsuchiura, Japan (at Hitachi MERL)
- 4th, IROS 1991, Osaka, Japan
- 5th, IROS 1992, Raleigh, USA
- 6th, IROS 1993, Yokohama, Japan
- 7th, IROS 1994, Munich, Germany
- 8th, IROS 1995, Pittsburgh, USA
- 9th, IROS 1996, Osaka, Japan
- 10th, IROS 1997, Grenoble, France
- 11th, IROS 1998, Victoria, Canada
- 12th, IROS 1999, Kyonggju, Korea
- 13th, IROS 2000, Takamatsu, Japan (at Kagawa University)
- 14th, IROS 2001, Maui, USA
- 15th, IROS 2002, Lausanne, Switzerland (at EPFL)
- 16th, IROS 2003, Las Vegas, USA
- 17th, IROS 2004, Sendai, Japan (at Tohoku University)
- 18th, IROS 2005, Edmonton, Canada
- 19th, IROS 2006, Beijing, China
- 20th, IROS 2007, San Diego, USA
- 21st, IROS 2008, Nice, France
- 22nd, IROS 2009, St. Louis, USA
- 23rd, IROS 2010, Taipei, Taiwan
- 24th, IROS 2011, San Francisco, USA
- 25th, IROS 2012, Vilamoura, Portugal
- 26th, IROS 2013, Tokyo, Japan
- 27th, IROS 2014, Chicago, USA
- 28th, IROS 2015, Hamburg, Germany
- 29th, IROS 2016, Daejeon, Korea
- 30th, IROS 2017, Vancouver, Canada
- 31st, IROS 2018, Madrid, Spain
- 32nd, IROS 2019, Macau, China
- 33rd, IROS 2020, Las Vegas, USA, held virtually due to the COVID-19 pandemic
- 34th, IROS 2021, Prague, Czech Republic, held virtually due to the COVID-19 pandemic
- 35th, IROS 2022, Kyoto, Japan (at the Kyoto International Conference Center)
- 36th, IROS 2023, Detroit, USA
- 37th, IROS 2024, Abu Dhabi, United Arab Emirates
- 38th, IROS 2025, Hangzhou, China

== Planned Conferences ==
- 39th, IROS 2026, Pittsburgh, USA
- 40th, IROS 2027, Florence, Italy
