= Michal Valko =

French-Slovak computer scientist and AI researcher

Michal Valko 马悯伽
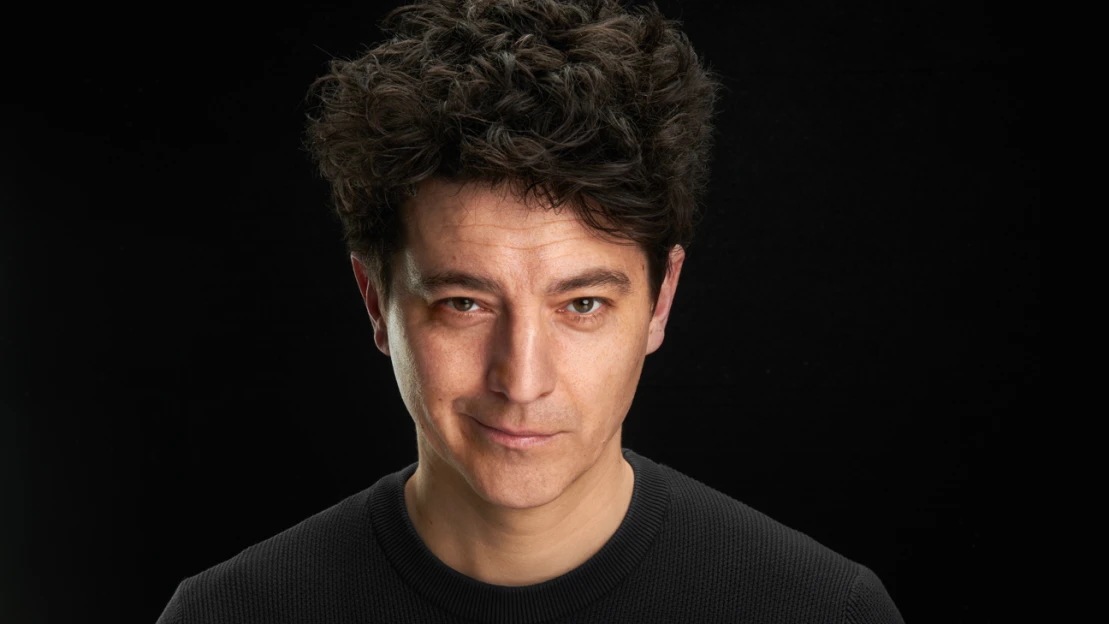
- Valko in 2025
- Born: Košice
- Education: Comenius University; University of Pittsburgh
- Known for: Bootstrap Your Own Latent (BYOL); Implicit exploration (IX) for multi-armed bandit algorithms; Nash Learning from Human Feedback (NLHF)
- Awards: ICML Outstanding Paper Award (2023)
- Scientific career
- Fields: Machine learning; Reinforcement learning; Self-supervised learning; Bandit algorithms; Large language models
- Workplaces: Inria; École normale supérieure Paris-Saclay; Google DeepMind; Meta AI; Isara Labs
- Theses: Adaptive Graph-Based Algorithms for Conditional Anomaly Detection and Semi-Supervised Learning (2011); Bandits on graphs and structures (2016)
- Doctoral advisor: Milos Hauskrecht
- Website: misovalko.github.io

Michal Valko (马悯伽) is a French-Slovak computer scientist and artificial intelligence researcher. He has held research positions at Inria, Google DeepMind and Meta AI, and has taught in the MVA master's programme at ENS Paris-Saclay. At DeepMind he worked on Bootstrap Your Own Latent (BYOL); at Meta, as Principal Llama Scientist, he worked on reinforcement learning and post-training for Llama 3. In 2025, he joined Isara Labs as a founding researcher and was also publicly identified as its Chief Models Officer. He was elected a Fellow of the European Laboratory for Learning and Intelligent Systems (ELLIS) in 2026 and has also undertaken venture-partner and startup-advisory roles.

His research spans machine learning, reinforcement learning, self-supervised learning and large language models. In 2014, he introduced implicit exploration (IX), an approach to exploration in adversarial multi-armed bandit problems. At DeepMind, he led the team that developed Bootstrap Your Own Latent (BYOL), a self-supervised representation-learning method. In 2023, he and his co-authors received an ICML Outstanding Paper Award for work on learning in zero-sum imperfect-information games. In 2024, he co-authored Nash Learning from Human Feedback (NLHF), which formulates preference learning using a pairwise preference model and a Nash-equilibrium objective.

== Childhood and education ==
Michal Valko was born in Košice in Slovakia. His mother Mária Valko (born Kmec) studied artificial intelligence at Pavol Jozef Šafárik University, graduating in 1979; his great-aunt Mary (Mária) Kmec worked on the ENIAC computer. Michal obtained his Master of Science degree in computer science from Comenius University in Bratislava in 2005. He subsequently obtained a Ph.D. in machine learning from the University of Pittsburgh in 2011, during which time he undertook a visiting research programme at Carnegie Mellon University. In 2016, he was awarded a Habilitation to conduct research in Mathematics from the École normale supérieure Paris-Saclay.

He attended Gymnázium Alejová in Košice and later studied artificial intelligence and mathematical methods in informatics at Comenius University's Faculty of Mathematics, Physics and Informatics. His doctoral advisor at Pittsburgh was Miloš Hauskrecht, and his subsequent postdoctoral research was supervised by Rémi Munos.

== Professional career ==
From 2003 to 2006, Valko worked as a research assistant in the Department of Neurophysiology at the Slovak Academy of Sciences. During his undergraduate studies he also spent a semester in 2005 at the Artificial Intelligence Centre of Universidade Nova de Lisboa in Portugal.

Valko subsequently undertook internships at Intel Labs in Silicon Valley (2009–2010). There he worked on face-recognition systems intended to help blind people identify other people. In 2011, he joined the French national research institute Inria, where he secured a permanent position as a research fellow in 2012 and subsequently began lecturing on machine learning as part of the MVA master's programme at ENS Paris-Saclay. He taught Graphs in Machine Learning in that programme. He also participated in projects with Adobe, Technicolor and Microsoft Research.

In 2018, he co-created the Google DeepMind research laboratory in Paris with Rémi Munos, where he worked from 2019 to 2024. His involvement in founding the Paris group was described in interviews with Forbes and Startitup. After work on representation learning, he contributed to research involving large language models such as Sparrow, Bard and Gemini.

In 2024, he joined Meta's generative-AI group in Paris as a Principal Llama Scientist, working on reinforcement learning and post-training for Llama 3. Some contemporary accounts described his position as principal Llama engineer.

In March 2024, reports described Mark Zuckerberg personally contacting Valko as part of the competitive recruitment of researchers for generative AI. In later interviews with Denník N and Forbes, Valko said that Zuckerberg called him while he was on holiday, that Meta made an offer within minutes without a conventional interview, and that the company needed reinforcement-learning expertise for Llama 3.

In 2025, he joined Isara Labs as a founding researcher. In the programme of ESET World 2025 he was described as the startup's Chief Models Officer and a member of its founding team, and delivered a keynote entitled World Models and How to Find Them.

In March 2026, The Wall Street Journal reported that OpenAI was backing Isara, describing the company's work on systems in which multiple AI agents communicate and cooperate on complex problems.

== Research ==
Valko's early research included graph-based methods for online semi-supervised learning. His 2011 doctoral dissertation studied approximate graph methods for settings in which data arrive in a stream and computation and storage become limiting.

In 2014, with Tomáš Kocák, Gergely Neu and Rémi Munos, Valko introduced implicit exploration for bandit problems with side observations. The method incorporates exploration through biased loss estimates, and their NeurIPS paper gave a near-optimal regret algorithm that does not require the observation system to be known before an action is selected. Implicit exploration was later included in Valko's 2016 habilitation thesis, Bandits on Graphs and Structures.

Another line of his research concerned the scalability of graph and kernel methods. In 2017, Daniele Calandriello, Alessandro Lazaric and Valko introduced SQUEAK, a single-pass kernel approximation algorithm that avoids constructing the full kernel matrix. The work addressed the quadratic time and storage needed to construct and store such matrices; its running time is linear in the number of samples, up to its dependence on the effective dimension. In 2018, with Calandriello, Lazaric and Ioannis Koutis, he applied distributed spectral sparsification to large-scale graph learning. Their method constructs a sparsified graph using near-linear memory and extends effective-resistance approaches associated with Daniel Spielman and Nikhil Srivastava to a regularized setting used in machine learning.

Valko also studied sequential optimisation with evaluations of different computational costs and accuracies. In a 2020 AISTATS paper with Côme Fiegel and Victor Gabillon, he co-developed Kometo, an algorithm for adaptive multi-fidelity optimisation. The work analysed how a learner can balance the expense of high-fidelity evaluations against the bias of cheaper approximations, without requiring prior knowledge of smoothness or fidelity parameters.

At DeepMind, Valko led the team that designed and published Bootstrap Your Own Latent (BYOL), a self-supervised representation-learning method presented at NeurIPS in 2020. BYOL uses an online and a target neural network, with the online network trained to predict the target network's representation of another augmented view of the same image. Unlike the contrastive methods with which it was compared, BYOL does not require negative example pairs.

Another strand of work addressed goal-directed exploration. In Adaptive Multi-Goal Exploration (AISTATS 2022), Valko and his co-authors introduced AdaGoal, a goal-selection strategy that targets states according to uncertainty about whether they are reachable, with provable sample-efficiency guarantees for reward-free reinforcement learning.

Related research extended prediction-based representation learning to reinforcement-learning exploration. Valko was among the co-authors of BYOL-Explore (NeurIPS 2022), which used prediction errors in learned representations to guide exploration in visually complex environments. In 2023, he co-authored Curiosity in Hindsight, which developed an approach for separating environmental stochasticity from novelty in intrinsic-exploration signals.

In the 2023 NeurIPS paper Model-free Posterior Sampling via Learning Rate Randomization, Valko and colleagues introduced Randomized Q-learning (RandQL). Their model-free reinforcement-learning algorithm uses randomised learning rates to obtain exploration behaviour without explicit exploration bonuses, and the paper analysed regret guarantees in both finite and metric state-action spaces. He also co-authored Half-Hop, an ICML 2023 paper on modifying graph structure to slow message passing in graph neural networks.

In 2023, Valko, Côme Fiegel, Pierre Menard, Tadashi Kozuno, Rémi Munos and Vianney Perchet studied learning in zero-sum imperfect-information games through self-play with trajectory feedback. They established a problem-independent lower bound on the number of game trajectories required to learn near-optimal strategies and introduced two follow-the-regularized-leader algorithms: Balanced FTRL, which matches the lower bound when the information-set structure is known in advance, and Adaptive FTRL, which adapts its regularization without requiring that prior knowledge. The paper received an ICML Outstanding Paper Award.

In 2024, Valko co-authored Nash Learning from Human Feedback (NLHF), an alternative to standard reinforcement learning from human feedback. Rather than learning a scalar reward model from pairwise preferences and then optimizing that reward, NLHF models preferences between pairs of responses directly and seeks a policy that forms a Nash equilibrium of the preference model. The work introduced Nash-MD, a mirror-descent algorithm whose last iterate converges to a regularized Nash equilibrium, and evaluated the approach on text summarization.

His work on learning in imperfect-information games continued beyond the award-winning 2023 paper. Local and Adaptive Mirror Descents in Extensive-Form Games (NeurIPS 2024) studied local online mirror descent with adaptive learning rates and fixed trajectory-sampling policies, obtaining convergence guarantees for zero-sum imperfect-information games. A 2025 ICML paper, The Harder Path, analysed the rate limits of last-iterate convergence for independently learning players in zero-sum matrix games with bandit feedback, and presented algorithms attaining the established optimal rate.

Other joint work in 2024 examined learning from human preferences through identity preference optimisation (IPO), including a theoretical framework for pairwise preference models. A separate ICML paper established conditions under which online IPO is equivalent to Nash-MD and proposed IPO-MD, an approach using regularised sampling.

Reports in 2024 described Mark Zuckerberg's personal involvement in recruiting Valko to Meta, as part of wider competition for AI researchers. At Meta, Valko worked on reinforcement learning and post-training for Llama 3 and co-authored The Llama 3 Herd of Models, the technical report describing the model family, including its 405-billion-parameter model, multilinguality, coding, reasoning, tool use and multimodal capabilities, as well as its training and post-training methods.

In 2026, Valko co-authored Language Generation with Replay: A Learning-Theoretic View of Model Collapse with Giorgio Racca and Amartya Sanyal. The ICML paper analysed, in a learning-theoretic framework, the effects of including model-generated text in subsequent training data.

=== Research software ===
Valko is a co-author of rlberry, a Python-based reinforcement-learning library intended for research and education. The project provides implementations and tools to compare learning algorithms and reproduce experiments; the software was released through Zenodo with contributions from Omar Darwiche Domingues, Yannis Flet-Berliac, Édouard Leurent, Pierre Ménard and Xuedong Shang. His research-project catalogue also includes publicly released code associated with BYOL, Half-Hop and bandit algorithms.

== Awards and recognition ==
During his doctoral studies, Valko received an Andrew Mellon Predoctoral Fellowship for 2008–2009. His professional biography also lists Compunetix Best Research Awards at the University of Pittsburgh in 2008 and 2011, and recognition at the university's 2009 Honors Convocation.

In 2010, the paper Conditional Outlier Detection for Clinical Alerting, which Valko co-authored with Milos Hauskrecht and colleagues, received the American Medical Informatics Association's Homer R. Warner Award at its Annual Symposium. A second co-authored work, Online Semi-Supervised Perception: Real-Time Learning without Explicit Feedback, received the best-paper award at the 2010 IEEE Online Learning for Computer Vision workshop associated with CVPR.

Valko received Inria's Prime d'excellence scientifique for 2014–2017 and again for 2018–2021. In 2015, the International Conference on Machine Learning recognised him with a Reviewer Award, as recorded in its conference booklet. In the same year, Comenius University included him among its distinguished alumni. In 2018, the conference also named him among its ten top reviewers. In 2023, he and his co-authors received an ICML Outstanding Paper Award for Adapting to game trees in zero-sum imperfect information games. In 2024, the Slovak edition of Forbes included Valko in its Changemakers list, in a category covering artificial intelligence and large language models.

In 2026, he was elected a Fellow of the European Laboratory for Learning and Intelligent Systems (ELLIS) through its 2025–2026 selection process. The official ELLIS announcement lists Valko among the new Fellows in the Paris unit. That year he received first place in the AI Social Impact of the Year category and second place in the AI Innovator of the Year category of the ASAI AI Personality of the Year awards.

== Scientific community and public engagement ==
=== Mathematics education ===
Valko was among the organizers of the Korešpondenčný matematický seminár (KMS) in the 2002/03 school year, alongside Richard Kollár and Alexander Erdélyi. KMS brought together the Stredoslovenský korešpondenčný matematický seminár (SKMS), the Bratislavský korešpondenčný matematický seminár (BKMS), and Bratislava-based organizers of STROM. Its organizers described the unification as a way to broaden participation, with separate categories for beginning and more experienced students, while continuing to operate on a voluntary, unpaid basis. The camp archive lists Valko among the leaders of KMS's BETA residential mathematics camps in 2003 and 2004.

=== Scientific organization, publishing and evaluation ===
Valko has served as an action editor for Transactions on Machine Learning Research. He was an area chair for NeurIPS in 2018, 2019 and 2020, and for the International Conference on Learning Representations in 2021, as well as a senior programme committee member for IJCAI in 2017. The International Conference on Machine Learning recognized him among its ten top reviewers in 2018.

His later conference service included area-chair responsibilities at NeurIPS in 2023 and 2024, senior area-chair work at ICML 2024, and participation in the organisation of a 2024 ICML workshop on aligning large language models with human preferences.

His programme committee service has also included the 2019 Conference on Learning Theory and the 2021 workshop Graph Neural Networks and Systems (GNNSys).

At Inria, Valko was an elected member of the institute's evaluation committee, serving on researcher-recruitment, promotion and scientific-excellence-award committees. His responsibilities included national junior-researcher selection and a working group on deontological ethics; he also served on a faculty-recruitment committee at CMLA, ENS Paris-Saclay. In 2018, he participated in the working group for the creation of the RandOpt research team and the national committee for secondments at Inria.

Valko was programme co-chair of the 2018 CNRS summer school on Networks, Graphs, and Machine Learning (RESCOM), and organizing co-chair of the Optimizing Human Learning workshop that year. With Laura Toni, he co-organized the June 2019 UCL–French Embassy workshop on graph-based machine learning and sequential decision-making in London.

As a member of Inria's SequeL team, he helped organize the 2019 Reinforcement Learning Summer School in Lille. The two-week school combined lectures and practical sessions on reinforcement learning and bandit algorithms, selecting 110 participants from about 300 applications. He also served on the programme committee of the 2015 European Workshop on Reinforcement Learning (EWRL). SequeL hosted EWRL in Lille in 2008, 2015 and 2018; its successor team, Scool, was announced as the organizer of the October 2026 Lille edition.

=== Teaching and research mentorship ===
Valko has taught Graphs in Machine Learning in the MVA master's programme and co-supervised doctoral research on sequential decision-making, bandit algorithms and graph learning. His doctoral-examination service includes thesis juries at Toulouse III University in 2017 and 2018, and serving as the opponent at a doctoral defence at Chalmers University of Technology in 2019.

His involvement in the Eastern European Machine Learning Summer School (EEML) has included mentoring, lecturing and facilitating journal clubs between 2020 and 2022, and co-organising the 2023 edition in Košice. EEML seeks to strengthen machine-learning communities in Eastern Europe and offers need-based financial support for participation.

His teaching and invited lectures have also addressed machine-learning theory, model alignment and self-supervised representation learning in Europe and beyond. In 2025, he spoke at a Helmholtz–ELLIS workshop on foundation models in science in Berlin, presenting alternatives to conventional reward-model-based LLM alignment.

Valko serves on the advisory board of GHOST Day, an applied-machine-learning conference in Poznań. He has also lectured at DataFest Yerevan in 2023 and 2025, and at Yerevan State University's seventh Mathematics and Applications summer school, held in Tsaghkadzor, Armenia, in 2025.

He delivered the opening keynote at the May 2026 GHOST Day conference, The Genesis of Predictive Architectures: How AI Can Extract Meaning from Unlabeled Data, focused on self-supervised learning and BYOL.

The programme of the 2023 AI for Africa TechInnovDays in Morocco included two sessions by Valko on representation learning and reinforcement learning.

=== Scientific and venture advisory work ===
Valko's startup mentoring has included companies applying artificial intelligence to healthcare, materials discovery and mineral exploration. In a 2025 interview with Forbes, he discussed his work with Sword Health, Entalpic and Lithosquare, and his angel investment in Entalpic. He has also advised the materials-science company Altrove and the healthcare-technology company Tortus.

His work with venture-capital firms has included venture-partner roles at KAYA VC, Formula VC and Sparkle Ventures. EU-Startups described Valko as part of KAYA's network of specialists supporting portfolio companies, alongside founders and technology practitioners, in its coverage of KAYA's €70 million fundraising round in 2025.

Valko's professional website also lists venture-partner affiliations with Cherry Ventures, Visionaries and RAISE Ventures.

The companies identified in his publicly documented advisory and investment work span several application areas. Entalpic, a French company applying AI to industrial chemistry, listed him among its academic and industry advisers in a 2024 financing announcement, together with researchers and entrepreneurs including Yoshua Bengio and Thomas Wolf. Altrove lists Valko as an adviser and named him among its angel investors when announcing a $10 million financing round. Tortus lists him on its board-and-advisors page for its healthcare documentation technology.

Additional advisory relationships named in Valko's own professional records include companies developing medical and clinical AI (Doctolib, HinLab and Seerlinq), scientific and materials applications (Sigma Nova and Lithosquare), procurement and document automation (Forgent AI and Retab), and AI model and evaluation technology (Mistral AI, Fastino, Mercor, HaizeLabs and Atla). His listed angel investments include Entalpic and Forgent AI.

His website also lists broader advisory work with AI startups in areas such as autonomous agents, robotics, procurement, finance and developer tools, as well as advisory-board positions at GHOST Day, FOST Paris, OpenEuroLLM and The Benchmarks and Baselines and an ambassador role with the FR8 initiative.

=== Public engagement and volunteering ===
Valko is an ambassador of the ESET Science Award. He has also volunteered with senior citizens, an activity described by both the award's organizers and Forbes Slovensko.

In that ambassador role he has supported the award's aim of raising awareness of science in Slovakia and connecting scientists and research institutions internationally. The award's international jury is distinct from its ambassadors; in 2026 it was chaired by Serge Haroche, the 2012 Nobel Prize laureate in Physics.

At a November 2024 conference hosted by the Faculty of Mathematics, Physics and Informatics of Comenius University, Valko delivered the opening keynote, Gamification of Large Language Models. The university described the inaugural MatFyz CONNECTIONS event as a meeting of researchers, alumni and industrial collaborators.

In 2025, Valko spoke at Slovakia's European Researchers' Night in Bratislava, delivering a presentation on training large language models amid noisy and conflicting data and opinions. His biography for the ESET Science Award also describes longstanding volunteer activities with older people.

On 24 November 2025, Valko participated in the Responsible Intelligence: Shaping the Future of AI Together panel at the BratislavAI Forum's High-Level Summit on AI in Bratislava, organized by Slovakia's Ministry of Education in cooperation with the OECD. Chaired by Slovak education minister Tomáš Drucker, the panel also included OECD Secretary-General Mathias Cormann, UN technology envoy Amandeep Singh Gill, UNESCO Director-General Khaled El-Enany, and European Commission Executive Vice-President Roxana Mînzatu. The summit featured opening remarks by Slovak president Peter Pellegrini and a keynote by Christine Lagarde, president of the European Central Bank.

Valko also delivered closing remarks at the summit. A draft programme published by the National Bank of Slovakia had listed both Valko and Drucker for this portion of the event, and a recording of the closing remarks was subsequently made available online.

In 2026, Slovak public broadcaster STVR reported Valko's comments on the potential for AI agents to facilitate cyberattacks, as well as his views on AI regulation and the concentration of technological power.

In April 2026, the Kempelen Institute of Intelligent Technologies (KInIT) hosted a public discussion with Valko in Bratislava on uncertainty in artificial intelligence, the future of companies and the development of Slovakia's research ecosystem. KInIT published an interview under the title Where Are Humans Still Better Than AI? in May 2026. He also discussed artificial-intelligence sovereignty at the European AI Forum in 2026.
