= AAAI Conference on Artificial Intelligence =

Conference series on artificial intelligence

- Abbreviation: AAAI
- Discipline: Machine learning, artificial intelligence

Publication details
- History: 1980–present
- Frequency: Annual
- Open access: yes (on AAAI Digital Library Conference Proceedings - www.aaai.org/Library/conferences-library.php)
- Website: https://www.aaai.org/Conferences/AAAI/aaai.php

The AAAI Conference on Artificial Intelligence is a leading international academic conference in artificial intelligence held annually. It ranks 4th in terms of H5 Index in Google Scholar's list of top AI publications, after ICLR, NeurIPS, and ICML. It is supported by the Association for the Advancement of Artificial Intelligence (AAAI), after which it is named. Precise dates vary from year to year, but paper submissions are generally due at the end of August to beginning of September, and the conference is generally held during the following February. The first AAAI was held in 1980 at Stanford University, Stanford California.

During AAAI-20 conference, AI pioneers and 2018 Turing Award winners (often referred to as the Nobel Prize of Computing) Yann LeCun and Yoshua Bengio, among eight other researchers, were honored as the AAAI 2020 Fellows.

Along with other conferences such as NeurIPS and ICML, AAAI uses an artificial-intelligence algorithm to assign papers to reviewers.

== Sponsors ==
Many leading technology companies, including Google, Microsoft, Amazon (company), IBM, Baidu, Bytedance, and Huawei, sponsor and participate in AAAI to publish and showcase their latest theoretical and applied research. Sponsoring companies also actively recruit AI talents at the conference.

== Locations ==
- AAAI-2026 Singapore Expo, Singapore
- AAAI-2025 Pennsylvania Convention Center, Philadelphia, Pennsylvania, United States
- AAAI-2024 Vancouver Convention Centre, Vancouver, British Columbia, Canada
- AAAI-2023 Washington Convention Center, Washington, D.C., United States
- (Canada) AAAI-2022 Virtual Conference
- (Canada) AAAI-2021 Virtual Conference
- AAAI-2020 Hilton New York Midtown, New York, New York, United States
- AAAI-2019 Hilton Hawaiian Village, Honolulu, Hawaii, United States
- AAAI-2018 Hilton New Orleans Riverside, New Orleans, Louisiana, United States
- AAAI-2017 San Francisco, California, United States
- AAAI-2016 Phoenix, Arizona, United States
- AAAI-2015 Austin, Texas, United States
- AAAI-2014 Québec Convention Center, Québec City, Québec, Canada
- AAAI-2013 Bellevue, Washington, United States
- AAAI-2012 Toronto, Ontario, Canada
- AAAI-2011 San Francisco, California, United States
- AAAI-2010 Westin Peachtree Plaza, Atlanta, Georgia, United States
- AAAI-2008 Chicago, Illinois, United States
- AAAI-2007 Toronto, Ontario, Canada
- AAAI-2006 Boston, Massachusetts, United States
- AAAI-2005 Pittsburgh, Pennsylvania, United States
- AAAI-2004 San Jose, California, United States
- AAAI-2002 Shaw conference center in Edmonton, Alberta, Canada
- AAAI-2000 Austin, Texas, United States
- AAAI-1999 Orlando, Florida, United States
- AAAI-1998 Madison, Wisconsin, United States
- AAAI-1997 Providence, Rhode Island, United States
- AAAI-1996 Portland, Oregon, United States
- AAAI-1994 Seattle, Washington, United States
- AAAI-1993 Washington Convention Center, Washington, D.C., United States
- AAAI-1992 San Jose Convention Center, San Jose, California, United States
- AAAI-1991 Anaheim Convention Center, Anaheim, California, United States
- AAAI-1990 Boston, Massachusetts, United States
- AAAI-1988 Saint Paul, Minnesota, United States
- AAAI-1987 Seattle, Washington, United States
- AAAI-1986 Philadelphia, Pennsylvania, United States
- AAAI-1984 University of Texas, Austin, Texas, United States
- AAAI-1983 Washington, D.C., United States
- AAAI-1982 Carnegie Mellon University and the University of Pittsburgh, Pittsburgh, Pennsylvania, United States
- AAAI-1980 Stanford, California, United States

== See also ==
- Journal of Machine Learning Research
- Machine Learning (journal)
- NeurIPS
