= Eric Brewer =

Eric Brewer may refer to:

- Eric Brewer (ice hockey) (born 1979), Canadian ice hockey player
- Eric Brewer (scientist), American computer scientist
