= Stefanie Jegelka =

German computer scientist

Stefanie Sabrina Jegelka is a German computer scientist whose research in machine learning includes submodular optimization in computer vision and deep learning for graph neural networks. She is an associate professor of computer science at the Massachusetts Institute of Technology, and Alexander von Humboldt Professor at the Technical University of Munich.

== Education and career ==
As a high school student from a small town in Germany, Jegelka won an award in an annual ThinkQuest competition for the design of educational web sites; her site concerned butterflies. She became a bioinformatics student at the University of Tübingen, advised by Ulrike von Luxburg and Michael Kaufmann, with an exchange year at the University of Texas at Austin, and earned a diploma in 2007. Continuing her studies jointly at the Max Planck Institute for Intelligent Systems in Tübingen and at ETH Zurich, she completed a Ph.D. in 2012. Her dissertation, Combinatorial Problems with Submodular Coupling in Machine Learning and Computer Vision, was jointly supervised by Jeff Bilmes, Bernhard Schölkopf, and Andreas Krause.

After postdoctoral research from 2012 to 2014 at the University of California, Berkeley with Michael I. Jordan and Trevor Darrell, she became X-Consortium Career Development Assistant Professor in the Department of Electrical Engineering and Computer Science at the Massachusetts Institute of Technology in 2015, and was promoted to associate professor with tenure in 2022. She was awarded a Humboldt Professorship in 2022 and joined TU Munich as a Humboldt Professor in 2024.

== Recognition ==
Jegelka received the 2015 German Pattern Recognition Award. She became a Sloan Research Fellow in 2018.

She was an invited speaker at the 2022 (virtual) International Congress of Mathematicians.
