= Freedom Network =

Freedom Network may refer to:

- Freedom Network, an anonymity network controlled by Zero Knowledge Systems from 1997 to 2001
- Freedom Network, a series of HMO health insurance plans by Oxford Health Plans in the New York metropolitan area
- Texas Freedom Network, an activist organization to counter right-wing Christian social doctrine

== See also ==
- Network to Freedom
