= Von Luxburg =

Von Luxburg is a German surname. Notable people with the name include:

- Friedrich von Luxburg (1783–1856), German diplomat
- Friedrich von Luxburg (1829–1905), German judge and jurist
- Johann Friedrich von Luxburg (1748–1820), German nobleman
- Johannes Girtanner von Luxburg (1705–1781), German politician
- Karl von Luxburg (1872–1956), German diplomat
- Karl August von Luxburg (1782–1849), German theatre director
- Ulrike von Luxburg (born 1975), German computer scientist

== See also ==
- Counts of Luxburg
