= ZKS =

ZKS may refer to

- Communist League of Slovakia
- League of Communists of Slovenia
- ZKS Granat Skarżysko
- Zero Knowledge Systems, privacy technology company
