= David A. Wagner =

American computer scientist (born 1974)

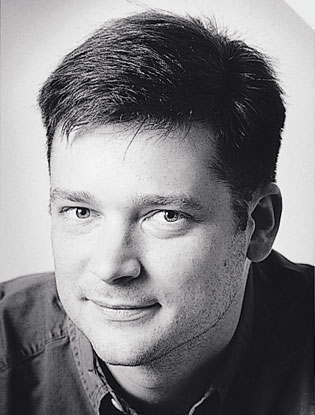
- Born: 1974
- Education: University of California, Berkeley (PhD)
- Employer(s): University of California, Berkeley
- Known for: Cryptanalysis, cipher design, electronic voting
- Scientific career
- Fields: Computer science
- Doctoral advisor: Eric Brewer
- Website: http://www.cs.berkeley.edu/~daw/

David A. Wagner (born 1974) is an American professor of computer science at the University of California, Berkeley and a well-known researcher in cryptography and computer security. He is a member of the Election Assistance Commission's Technical Guidelines Development Committee, tasked with assisting the EAC in drafting the Voluntary Voting System Guidelines. He was also a member of the ACCURATE project.

== Biography ==
Wagner received an A.B. in mathematics from Princeton University in 1995, an M.S. in computer science from Berkeley in 1999, and a Ph.D. in computer science from Berkeley in 2000. He joined the faculty of Berkeley after graduation, became a Full Professor in 2010, and was chair of the Computer Science Department from 2020 to 2022. He has received awards for his teaching.

== Research ==
Wagner has published two books and over 200 peer-reviewed scientific papers. His notable achievements include:

- 2017 Development of the Carlini-Wagner attack on machine learning models (with Nicholas Carlini); used it to break 20 adversarial machine learning defenses.
- 2007 Served as principal investigator for the source code review and also the documentation review of the historic California state Top-to-Bottom review of electronic voting systems certified for use. Flaws found with vendor-supplied voting machines resulted in decertification and provisional recertification by the Secretary of State.
- 2001 Cryptanalysis of WEP, the security protocol used in 802.11 "WiFi" networks (with Nikita Borisov and Ian Goldberg).
- 2000 Cryptanalysis of the A5/1 stream cipher used in GSM cellphones (with Alex Biryukov and Adi Shamir).
- 1999 Cryptanalysis of Microsoft's PPTP tunnelling protocol (with Bruce Schneier and "Mudge").
- 1999 Invention of the slide attack, a new form of cryptanalysis (with Alex Biryukov); also the boomerang attack and mod n cryptanalysis (the latter with Bruce Schneier and John Kelsey).
- 1998 Development of Twofish block cipher, which was a finalist for NIST's Advanced Encryption Standard competition (with Bruce Schneier, John Kelsey, Doug Whiting, Chris Hall, and Niels Ferguson).
- 1997 Cryptanalyzed the CMEA algorithm used in many U.S. cellphones (with Bruce Schneier).
- 1995 Discovered a flaw in the implementation of SSL in Netscape Navigator (with Ian Goldberg).
