= Ed Posner =

American mathematician

Edward Charles Posner (August 10, 1933 – June 15, 1993) was an American information theorist and neural network researcher. He became chief technologist at the Jet Propulsion Laboratory, and founded the Conference on Neural Information Processing Systems.

== Education and career ==
Posner was born on August 10, 1933, in Brooklyn, and graduated from Stuyvesant High School in 1950; at Stuyvesant, one of his close friends was mathematician Paul Cohen. He took only two years to complete his undergraduate studies in physics at the University of Chicago, graduating in 1952, and he then switched to mathematics for a master's degree in 1953 and a PhD in 1957. While a graduate student, he also visited Bell Labs, and later claimed that he had been assigned to the desk there that had formerly been Harry Nyquist's. His doctoral thesis, supervised by Irving Kaplansky, was on the subject of ring theory and entitled Differentiably Simple Rings; at only 26 pages long, it held the record for the shortest doctoral thesis at the university.

After finishing his studies, he became a mathematics instructor at the University of Wisconsin and then an assistant professor of mathematics at Harvey Mudd College. In 1961, Solomon W. Golomb hired him to lead the Information Processing Group at JPL. He led the group for 10 years and then, after a sequence of positions in higher management, he became chief technologist in JPL's Office of Telecommunications and Data Acquisition in 1982. He also held lecturer and visiting faculty positions in the applied mathematics and electrical engineering departments of the California Institute of Technology beginning in 1970.

He died after being hit by a truck while bicycling to work on June 15, 1993.

== Contributions ==
In ring theory, Posner is the namesake of Posner's theorem, stating that certain tensor products of algebras with the fields of fractions of their centers are central simple algebras.

Posner's research in information theory and coding theory was applied in the design of the NASA Deep Space Network, used for the communications between spacecraft and their base stations on Earth. He also studied communications networks and cellular telephone switching systems, and was an advocate for basic research in the US space program.

Beginning in the early 1980s, Posner founded the study of neural networks at JPL and Caltech, and helped create the interdisciplinary graduate program in Computation and Neural Systems at Caltech. He also helped found the annual Conference on Neural Information Processing Systems, served as general chair of the first conference in 1987, and chaired its oversight body, the NIPS Foundation.
