= Eric Brewer (scientist) =

American computer scientist

Eric A. Brewer
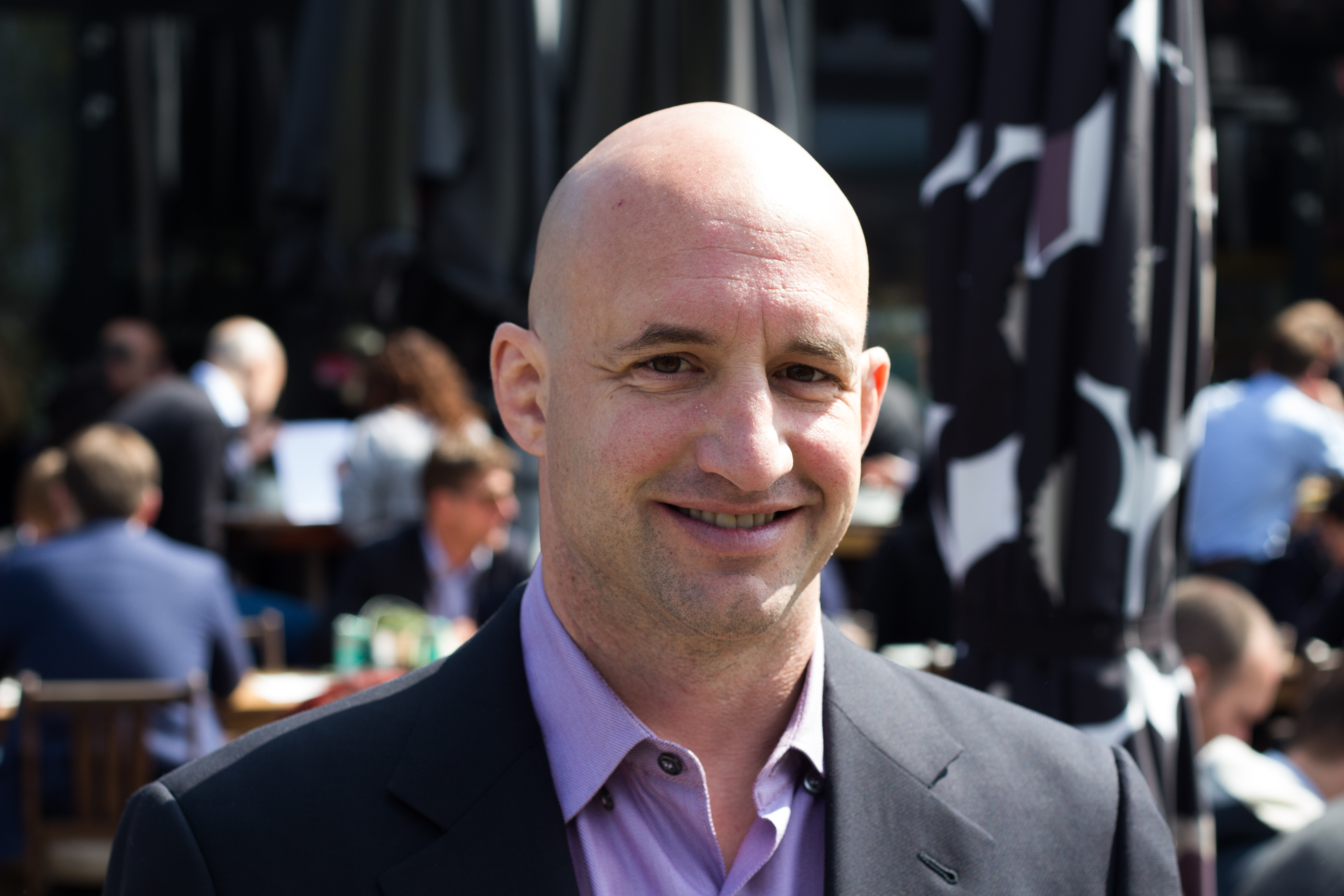
- Eric Brewer at TNW Conference 2015
- Education: Massachusetts Institute of Technology; University of California, Berkeley
- Known for: CAP theorem
- Awards: ACM Fellow; NAE Member
- Scientific career
- Fields: Computer science
- Workplaces: University of California, Berkeley; Google
- Thesis: Portable High-Performance Supercomputing: High-Level Platform-Dependent Optimization (1994)
- Doctoral advisor: William E. "Bill" Weihl
- Doctoral students: Nikita Borisov; Ian Goldberg; David A. Wagner; Matt Welsh
- Eric Brewer introducing himself recorded April 2015
- Website: www.cs.berkeley.edu/~brewer/

Eric Allen Brewer is professor emeritus of computer science at the University of California, Berkeley and vice-president of infrastructure at Google. His research interests include operating systems and distributed computing. He is known for formulating the CAP theorem about distributed network applications in the late 1990s.

In 1996, Brewer co-founded Inktomi Corporation (bought by Yahoo! in 2003) and became a paper billionaire during the dot-com bubble. Working with the United States federal government during the presidency of Bill Clinton, he helped to create USA.gov, which launched in 2000. His research also included a wireless networking scheme called WiLDNet, which promises to bring low-cost connectivity to rural areas of the developing world. He has worked at Google since 2011.

== Education ==
Brewer received a Bachelor of Science in electrical engineering and computer science (EECS) from UC Berkeley where he was a member of the Pi Lambda Phi fraternity. Later he earned a Master of Science and PhD in EECS from MIT. He received tenure from UC Berkeley in 2000.

== Awards ==
In 1999, he was named to the MIT Technology Review TR100 as one of the top 100 innovators in the world under the age of 35.

In 2007, Brewer was inducted as a Fellow of the Association for Computing Machinery "for the design of scalable, reliable internet services." That same year, he was also inducted into the National Academy of Engineering "for the design of highly scalable internet services."

Brewer is the 2009 recipient of the ACM-Infosys Foundation Award in the Computing Sciences "for his contributions to the design and development of highly scalable Internet services."

In 2009, Brewer received the SIGOPS Mark Weiser Award.

In 2013, the ETH Zurich honored him with the title Dr. sc. tech. (honoris causa).
