= Posner's theorem =

Theorem in algebra

In algebra, Posner's theorem states that given a prime polynomial identity algebra A with center Z, the ring $A \otimes_Z Z_{(0)}$ is a central simple algebra over $Z_{(0)}$, the field of fractions of Z. It is named after Ed Posner.
