= Nikita Borisov =

Cryptographer (born 1977)

- Born: 24 December 1977 (age 48); Moscow, USSR
- Occupations: Professor, University of Illinois at Urbana-Champaign
- Known for: OTR
- Website: http://hatswitch.org/~nikita/

Nikita Borisov is a cryptographer and computer security researcher, currently a professor at the University of Illinois at Urbana-Champaign. His notable work includes one of the first cryptanalyses of the WEP wireless encryption protocol together with Ian Goldberg and David Wagner, and the design of the Off-the-Record Messaging protocol with Goldberg.

Borisov received a B. Math in computer science and pure math in 1997 from the University of Waterloo. He received an M.S. and a Ph.D. in computer science from the University of California, Berkeley, in 2002 and 2005, respectively.
