= Vladimir Dmitriev (mathematician) =

Russian scientist in the field of mathematical physics (1932–2020)

Vladimir Ivanovich Dmitriev
- Владимир Иванович Дмитриев
- Born: 20 October 1932; Baku, Azerbaijan SSR, Soviet Union
- Died: 24 November 2020; Moscow, Russia
- Education: Moscow State University
- Known for: Electromagnetic fields in inhomogeneous media; inverse problems in geophysics; mathematical modelling
- Awards: Order of Honour (2003); Order of the Badge of Honour (1980); USSR State Prize (1976); USSR Council of Ministers Prize (1986); Lomonosov Prize (1983); Honoured Scientist of the Russian Federation (1993); Honoured Professor of Moscow State University (1994)
- Scientific career
- Fields: Mathematical physics, Computational mathematics, Geophysics
- Workplaces: Faculty of Computational Mathematics and Cybernetics, Moscow State University
- Doctoral advisor: Andrey Tikhonov

Vladimir Ivanovich Dmitriev (Russian: Владимир Иванович Дмитриев; 20 October 1932 – 24 November 2020) was a Russian scientist in the field of mathematical physics, doctor of physical and mathematical sciences (1967), and professor at the MSU Faculty of Computational Mathematics and Cybernetics (CMC MSU). He served as head of the Laboratory of Mathematical Physics and as deputy dean of the faculty.

== Biography ==
Dmitriev graduated from secondary school in Baku in 1950 and from the Faculty of Physics at Moscow State University in 1955. In 1959 he completed postgraduate studies and defended his candidate (Ph.D.) dissertation on “Electromagnetic fields applied to problems of aero-electrical exploration,” supervised by Andrey N. Tikhonov. He received the degree of Doctor of Physical and Mathematical Sciences in 1967 for the dissertation “Electromagnetic fields in inhomogeneous media” and was awarded the title of professor in 1969.

From 1960 to 1962, he worked as scientific secretary of the Magnetic Laboratory of the A. A. Baikov Institute of Metallurgy and Materials Science. In 1962 he joined the Kurchatov Institute as a senior researcher.

From 1962 to 1982 Dmitriev worked at the Research Computing Centre of Moscow State University as senior researcher, head of sector, and deputy director. From 1982 until his death he was professor at the Department of Mathematical Physics of CMC MSU, head of its Laboratory of Mathematical Physics, and since 1986, deputy dean of the faculty.

== Research ==
Dmitriev developed mathematical methods for modelling electromagnetic fields in inhomogeneous media and contributed to inverse problems in geophysics. He worked on the mathematical theory of antenna design, radiating systems, and electromagnetic sounding methods used in exploration geophysics and geo-electrics. His algorithms were implemented in the software library Electromagnetic Fields in Geophysics used for applied research. He was a full member of the Russian Academy of Natural Sciences (1992), where he headed the section “Applied Mathematics and Mathematical Physics.” He also served as an editor for Applied Mathematics and Informatics (CMC MSU proceedings), the journal Computational Mathematics and Modeling, and on editorial boards of other scientific periodicals.

== Teaching ==
At CMC MSU Dmitriev taught courses on Differential Equations, Mathematical Modelling Systems, and Inverse Problems in Geophysics.

== Recognition ==
Dmitriev’s biography appears in reference works such as Professors of Moscow University: 1755–2004 and Faculty of Computational Mathematics and Cybernetics: History and Modernity, which document his contributions to mathematical physics and computational geophysics.

== Awards ==
- Order of Honour (2003)
- Order of the Badge of Honour (1980)
- USSR State Prize (1976)
- USSR Council of Ministers Prize (1986)
- Lomonosov Prize (1983)
- Honoured Scientist of the Russian Federation (1993)
- Honoured Professor of Moscow State University (1994)
- Three gold and one silver VDNKh medals

== Selected publications ==
Dmitriev authored more than 300 scientific papers and 27 books and textbooks, including:

- Differential Equations (Moscow: Argamak-Media, 2016, 284 pp., ISBN 978-5-00-024049-6).
- Marine Electromagnetic Soundings (Moscow: Argamak-Media, 2014, 192 pp., ISBN 978-5-00-024022-9).
- Inverse Problems of Geophysics (Moscow: MAKS Press, 2012, 340 pp.).

He also co-edited Numerical Methods in Mathematical Physics (Moscow State University, 1998).
