= Computational Optimization and Applications =

- Discipline: Mathematical optimization
- Language: English
- Edited by: William Hager

Publication details
- History: 1992–present
- Publisher: Springer Science+Business Media
- Frequency: 9 issues/3 vols./yr.
- Impact factor: 2.0 (2024)

Standard abbreviations
- ISO 4: Comput. Optim. Appl.

Indexing
- ISSN: 0926-6003 (print); 1573-2894 (web)
- OCLC no.: 905470758

Links
- Journal homepage; Online Archive

Computational Optimization and Applications is a peer-reviewed academic journal published by Springer Science+Business Media. The journal focuses on the analysis and development of computational algorithms and modeling technology for optimization. It also covers linear programming, computational complexity theory, automatic differentiation, approximations and error analysis, parametric programming, sensitivity analysis, and management science.

== Abstracting and indexing ==
Computational Optimization and Applications is abstracted and indexed in DBLP, Journal Citation Reports, Mathematical Reviews, Research Papers in Economics SCImago Journal Rank, Scopus, Science Citation Index, Zentralblatt MATH, among others. According to the Journal Citation Reports, the journal has a 2021 impact factor of 2.005.
