= Peer Review Week =

Annual week in September

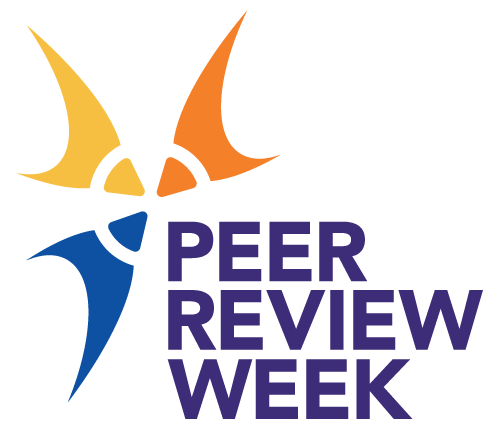
- Significance: Celebrates the importance of peer review
- Begins: 2016
- Date: 25-29 September
- Duration: 1 week
- Frequency: Annual

Peer Review Week is an annual scholarly communication event celebrating the value of peer review. It has taken place globally every September since 2015 in a multitude of locations both on- and offline. Typical activities include blogs, webinars, video and social media. Since 2016, each week has been themed. The number of organizations involved in the planning of the week, including scholarly societies, university libraries, publishers, vendors, funders and more, had increased to 55 in 2025, starting from "over 20" in the early years.

== History ==
Peer Review Week was founded in 2015. Founding organisations included ORCID, ScienceOpen, Sense about Science and Wiley (publisher).

== Themes ==
- 2025: "Rethinking Peer Review in the AI Era"
- 2024: "Innovation and Technology in Peer Review"
- 2023: "Peer Review and The Future of Publishing"
- 2022: "Research Integrity: Creating and supporting trust in research"
- 2021: "Identity in Peer Review"
- 2020: "Trust in Peer Review"
- 2019: "Quality in Peer Review"
- 2018: "Diversity in Peer Review"
- 2017: "Transparency in Peer Review"
- 2016: "Recognizing Peer Review"
