= Journal of Machine Learning Research =

- Discipline: Machine learning
- Language: English
- Edited by: Pradeep Ravikumar, Tong Zhang

Publication details
- History: 2000–present
- Publisher: JMLR, Inc. and Microtome Publishing (United States)
- Open access: Yes
- Impact factor: 4.091 (2018)

Standard abbreviations
- ISO 4: J. Mach. Learn. Res.

Indexing
- CODEN: JMLRAJ
- ISSN: 1532-4435 (print); 1533-7928 (web)
- LCCN: 00212568
- OCLC no.: 712803341

Links
- Journal homepage; Online archive

The Journal of Machine Learning Research is a peer-reviewed open access scientific journal covering machine learning. It was established in 2000 and the first editor-in-chief was Leslie Kaelbling. The current editors-in-chief are Pradeep Ravikumar (Carnegie Mellon University) and Tong Zhang (University of Illinois Urbana-Champaign), who replaced Francis Bach (Inria) and David Blei (Columbia University).

== History ==
The journal was established as an open-access alternative to the journal Machine Learning. In 2001, forty editorial board members of Machine Learning resigned, saying that in the era of the Internet, it was detrimental for researchers to continue publishing their papers in expensive journals with pay-access archives. The open access model employed by the Journal of Machine Learning Research allows authors to publish articles for free and retain copyright, while archives are freely available online.

Print editions of the journal were published by MIT Press until 2004 and by Microtome Publishing thereafter. From its inception, the journal received no revenue from the print edition and paid no subvention to MIT Press or Microtome Publishing.

In response to the prohibitive costs of arranging workshop and conference proceedings publication with traditional academic publishing companies, the journal launched a proceedings publication arm in 2007 and now publishes proceedings for several leading machine learning conferences, including the International Conference on Machine Learning, COLT, AISTATS, and workshops held at the Conference on Neural Information Processing Systems.
