= Zero Knowledge Systems =

Software company in Canada

- Industry: Privacy Technology
- Founded: 1998
- Headquarters: Montreal, Quebec, Canada
- Key people: Austin Hill (CEO) and Hamnett Hill (COO)
- Products: Freedom network freedom pseudonymous mail system
- Number of employees: 300
- Website: zero-knowledge.com

Zero-Knowledge Systems (also known as ZKS) was a Canadian privacy technology software and services company, best known for the Freedom Network, its privacy network. It was founded by brothers Austin Hill & Hamnett Hill and their father Hamnett Hill Sr. (aka Hammie Hill) in 1997. Its headquarters were in Montreal, Quebec. Early investors and board members were Mike Santer and Alex Hern co-founder Inktomi. The company rebranded under the new name Radialpoint though was no longer a developer of privacy-enhancing technologies. Most recently, it was acquired by AppDirect and rebranded as AppHelp.

Zero-Knowledge Systems was one of the first large-scale commercial attempts to combine cypherpunk principles with a for-profit technology. During its heyday, ZKS captured the media's imagination and successfully drew attention to the privacy risks of unsuspecting internet users.

Being based in Canada allowed it to circumvent the US ban on strong cryptography, considered "munitions" at the time. ZKS was featured in Wired magazine as early as 1999.

The ZKS Freedom Network was a pioneer of anonymous networking technology, predating the Tor network. Some of the enterprise privacy research was also inherited by the IBM Tivoli digital rights management suite.

Several of the company's employees were from an academic privacy-enhanced technology background: Stefan Brands (senior cryptographer) and cypherpunk background Ian Goldberg (chief scientist) and Adam Back (architect & cryptographer). Other employees included Mike Shaver (chief software officer), Adam Shostack, Anton Stiglic, Christian Paquin, Jonathan Wilkins and Ulf Moller. Stephanie Perrin served as Chief Privacy Officer for the firm before she became Director of Research and Policy at the Office of the Privacy Commissioner of Canada, and helped to draft PIPEDA, the Canadian privacy law.
