= Ulrike von Luxburg =

German computer scientist

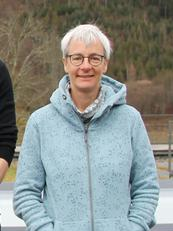
Von Luxburg at Oberwolfach in 2025

Ulrike von Luxburg (born 1975) is a German computer scientist known for her work on spectral clustering and graph Laplacians in machine learning. She is a professor of computer science at the University of Tübingen.

== Education and career ==
Von Luxburg was born in 1975 in Regensburg. She studied mathematics at the University of Konstanz, University of Grenoble, and University of Tübingen, completing a diplom (the German equivalent of a master's degree) in 2001. She became a researcher at the Max Planck Institute for Biological Cybernetics in Tübingen, and completed a doctorate through work there in 2004. Her dissertation, Statistical Learning with Similarity and Dissimilarity Functions, was promoted through Technische Universität Berlin, jointly by Stefan Jähnichen and Bernhard Schölkopf.

She headed the data mining group at the Fraunhofer Society's Fraunhofer Institute for Integrated Publications and Information Systems in Darmstadt from 2005 until the institute was dissolved in 2006. From 2007 to 2012, she was a research group leader in learning theory at the Max Planck Institute for Intelligent Systems.

Next, she became Heisenberg Professor for Machine learning at the University of Hamburg from 2012 to 2015, when she took her current position at the University of Tübingen as professor for the theory of machine learning.

== Recognition ==
Von Luxburg was a member of the Junge Akademie from 2008 to 2013. She was elected to the German National Academy of Sciences Leopoldina in 2020.
