= International Conference on Machine Learning =

Academic conference in machine learning

- Abbreviation: ICML
- Discipline: Machine learning, artificial intelligence, feature learning

Publication details
- History: 1980–present
- Frequency: Annual
- Open access: yes (on openreview.net)
- Website: https://icml.cc/

Proceedings of Machine Learning Research
- Language: English
- Edited by: Tegan Emerson, Hoel Kervadec, Neil Lawrence

Publication details
- History: 2017–present
- Open access: Yes

Standard abbreviations
- ISO 4: PMLR

Indexing
- ISSN: 2640-3498

Links
- Journal homepage

The International Conference on Machine Learning (ICML) is an international academic conference in machine learning held annually since 1980. It is the oldest and, along with NeurIPS and ICLR, one of the three primary conferences of highest impact and reputation in machine learning and artificial intelligence research. It is organized by the International Machine Learning Society (IMLS). Precise dates vary year to year, but paper submissions are generally due at the end of January, and the conference is generally held the following July.

== History ==
ICML began as the International Workshop on Machine Learning, first held at Carnegie Mellon University in Pittsburgh in July 1980 and organized by Jaime Carbonell, Ryszard S. Michalski, and Tom M. Mitchell. In 1993 it transitioned to a full conference series under the current name, building on nearly a decade of workshops. Since the 2010s its proceedings have been published open-access in the Proceedings of Machine Learning Research (PMLR), which grew out of JMLR’s Workshop & Conference Proceedings and was renamed PMLR in 2015.

ICML has published many important research papers that form the foundation of modern Artificial Intelligence. Some notable works include Lawrence Berkeley National Laboratory's K-means clustering via PCA (ICML 2004); Google's Batch Normalization; Google Brain's EfficientNet (ICML 2019); OpenAI's CLIP (ICML 2021) and the UC Berkeley's Soft Actor-Critic (ICML 2018).

The number of submitted (and accepted) papers has sharply increased within 10 years; from 1037 (270) in 2015 to 12107 (3260) in 2025. Meanwhile, the acceptance rate continues to average between 21 % (2020) and 30 % (2024). 2026 marked a new record with 24,371 submitted papers, more than doubling the previous year. Accepted submissions are presented on-site as posters; furthermore, particularly outstanding contributions are presented orally or are designated by a committee as "spotlight papers." In 2026, 2.2% of submitted contributions were designated as "spotlight" and 0.7% additionally as "oral". In addition, the best contribution is honored annually by a jury with an "Outstanding Paper Award" (formally "Best Paper Award").

== Profile ==
ICML’s scope spans the full breadth of machine learning, with particular emphasis on theoretical analysis, algorithmic innovation, and statistical learning. Compared to the other two big machine learning conferences NeurIPS and ICLR, ICML traditionally features more content on statistical learning theory, reinforcement learning and robotics, and optimization theory. Its annual proceedings are published in the open-access Proceedings of Machine Learning Research (PMLR).

ICML attracts sponsors seeking access to ML research and talent. Technology companies such as Google, Microsoft, Amazon, Meta, Apple are among sponsors, regularly publishing their research and recruiting researchers at the conference. Financial firms, such as Citadel Securities, Jane Street Capital and D.E. Shaw, also often have a presence at ICML.

== Locations ==
Year	Location	Country	Submissions	Accepted	Acceptance rate
2027	Rio de Janeiro	Brazil			
2026	Seoul	South Korea	23,918	6352	26.6%
2025	Vancouver	Canada	12,107	3260	26.93%
2024	Vienna	Austria	9653	2944	30.50%
2023	Honolulu	United States	6538	1828	27.96%
2022	Baltimore	United States	5630	1233	21.90%
2021	Vienna (virtual)	Austria	5513	1183	21.46%
2020	Vienna (virtual)	Austria	4990	1084	21.72%
2019	Los Angeles	United States	3424	773	22.58%
2018	Stockholm	Sweden	2473	621	25.11%
2017	Sydney	Australia	1676	434	25.89%
2016	New York City	United States	—	322	—
2015	Lille	France	1037	270	26.04%
2014	Beijing	China	—	310	—
2013	Atlanta	United States	—	283	—
2012	Edinburgh	United Kingdom	—	—	—
2011	Bellevue	United States	—	—	—
2010	Haifa	Israel	—	—	—
2009	Montréal	Canada	—	—	—
2008	Helsinki	Finland	—	—	—
2007	Corvallis	United States	—	—	—
2006	Pittsburgh	United States	—	—	—
2005	Bonn	Germany	—	—	—
2004	Banff	Canada	—	—	—
2003	Washington, D.C.	United States	—	—	—
2002	Sydney	Australia	—	—	—
2001	Williamstown	United States	—	—	—
2000	Stanford	United States	—	—	—
1999	Bled	Slovenia	—	—	—
1998	Madison	United States	—	—	—
1997	Nashville	United States	—	—	—
1996	Bari	Italy	—	—	—
1995	Tahoe City	United States	—	—	—
1994	New Brunswick	United States	—	—	—
1993	Amherst	United States	—	—	—
1992	Aberdeen	United Kingdom	—	—	—
1991	Evanston	United States	—	—	—
1990	Austin	United States	—	—	—
1989	Ithaca	United States	—	—	—
1988	Ann Arbor	United States	—	—	—
1987	Irvine	United States	—	—	—
1985	Skytop	United States	—	—	—
1983	Monticello	United States	—	—	—
1980	Pittsburgh	United States	—	—	—

== See also ==
- ICLR
- Journal of Machine Learning Research
- Machine Learning (journal)
- NeurIPS
