= International Conference on Learning Representations =

Academic conference in machine learning

- Abbreviation: ICLR
- Discipline: Machine learning, artificial intelligence, feature learning

Publication details
- History: 2013–present
- Frequency: Annual
- Open access: yes (on openreview.net)
- Website: https://iclr.cc/

The International Conference on Learning Representations (ICLR) (Note: Often informally pronounced /ˈaɪˌklɪər/ ("eye-clear"). https://www.linkedin.com/posts/yann-lecun_i-say-eye-clear-and-i-co-created-iclr-activity-7326128990165884928-MNdQ) is a machine learning conference typically held in late April or early May each year. Along with NeurIPS and ICML, it is one of the three primary conferences of highest impact and reputation in machine learning and artificial intelligence research.

The conference includes invited talks as well as oral and poster presentations of refereed papers. Since its inception in 2013, ICLR has employed an open peer review process to referee paper submissions (based on models proposed by Yann LeCun). It was founded by Yann LeCun and Yoshua Bengio in 2012.

== Editions ==
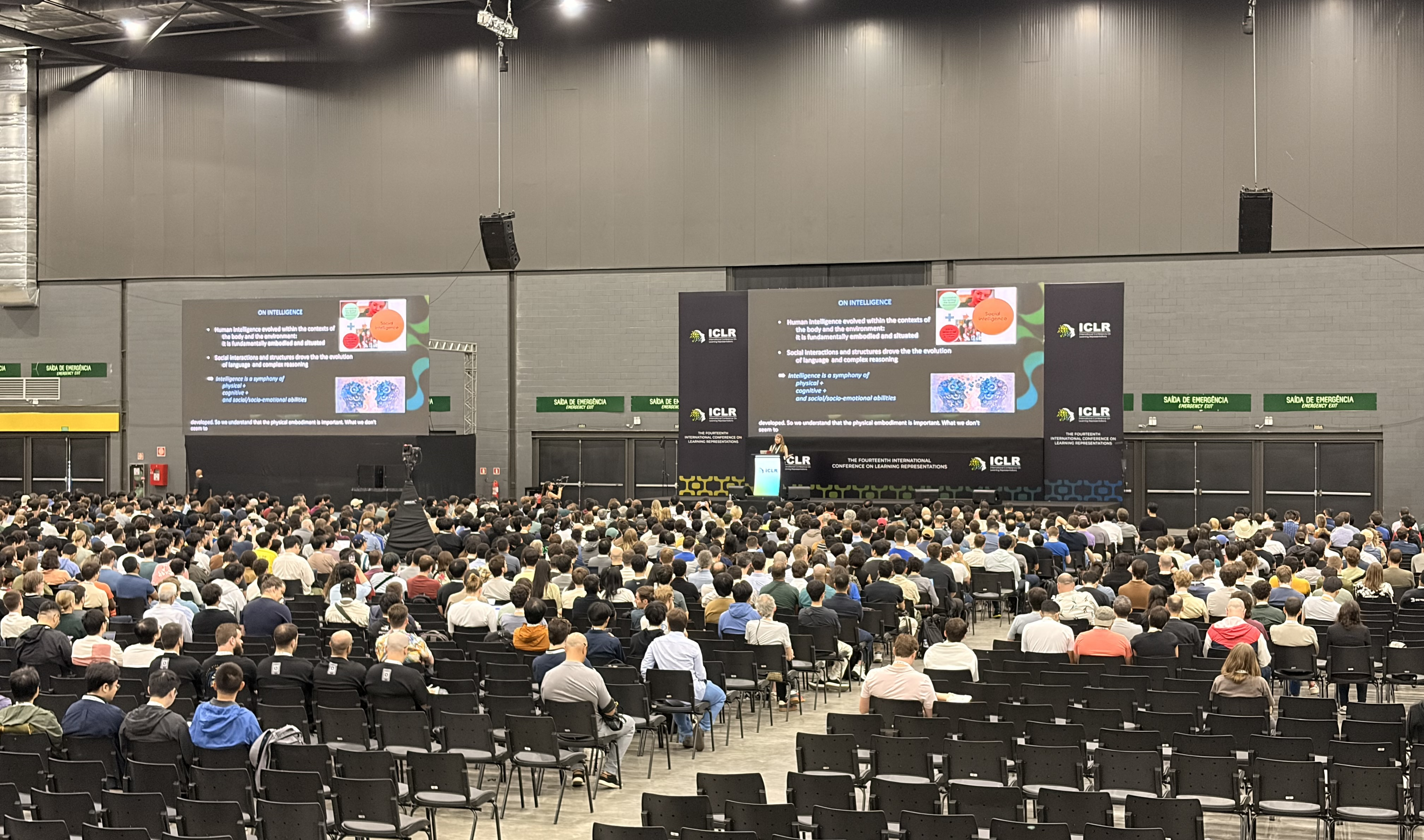
Main stage of ICLR 2026 in Rio

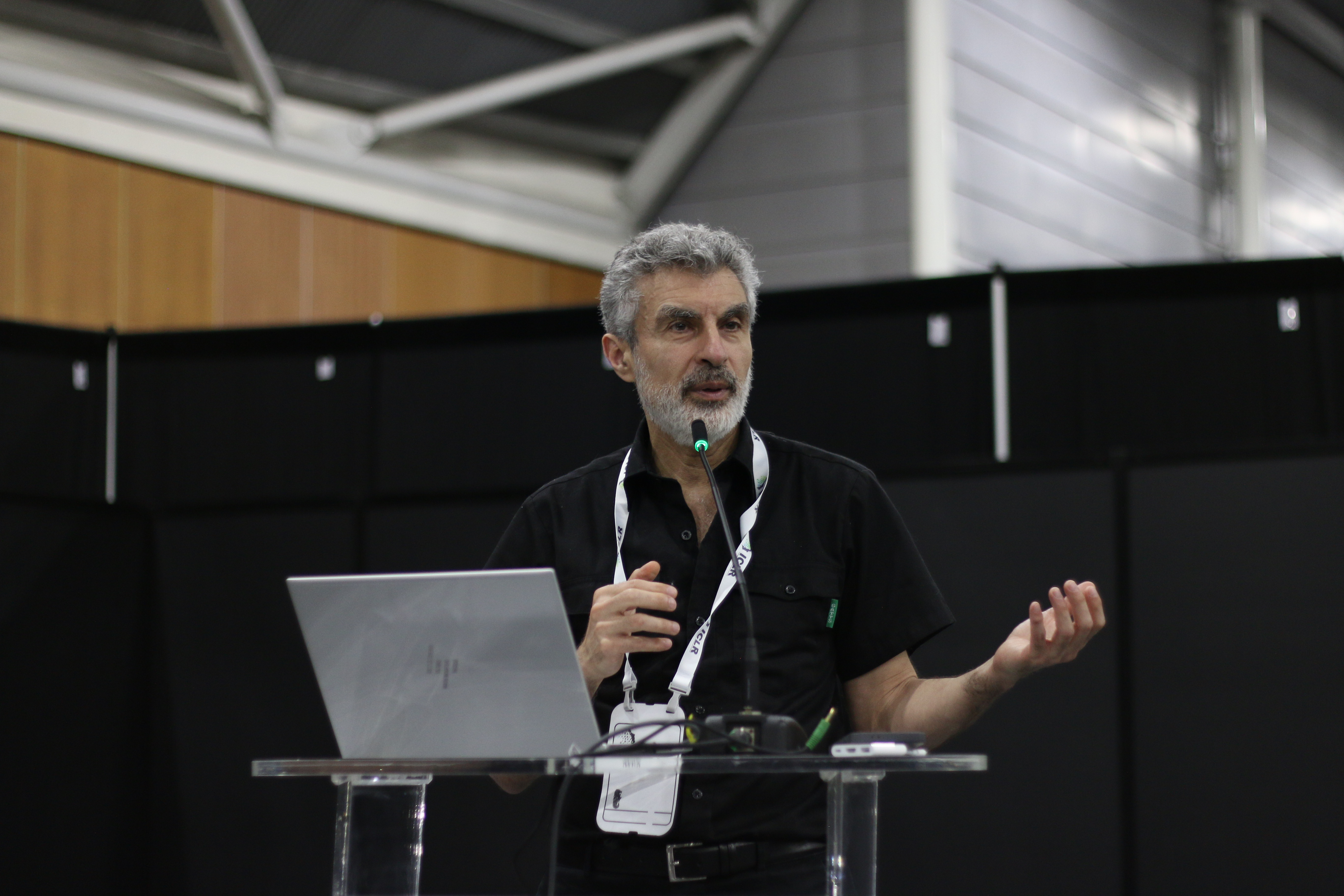
Founder Yoshua Bengio at ICLR 2025

Year	Location	Country	No. of Participants	...from No. of Countries	No. of paper submissions	...thereof accepted	Acceptance rate
2026	Rio de Janeiro	Brazil	?		19,525	5,355	27%
2025	Singapore	Singapore	11,039	85	11,603	3,704	31.92%
2024	Vienna	Austria	6,533	79	7,304	2,260	30.94%
2023	Kigali	Rwanda	3,758	73	4,955	1,575	31.79%
2022		(virtual conference)	5,200	81	3,422	1,095	32.00%
2021	Vienna	Austria (virtual conference)	6,300	64	3,014	860	28.53%
2020	Addis Ababa	Ethiopia (virtual conference)	5,600	76	2,594	687	26.48%
2019	New Orleans, Louisiana	United States	2,600	50	1,579	502	31.79%
2018	Vancouver	Canada	1,950	38	1,013	337	33.27%
2017	Toulon	France	?		490	198	40.41%
2016	San Juan, Puerto Rico	United States	?		?		
2015	San Diego, California	United States	?		?		
2014	Banff National Park	Canada	?		69	69	100.00%
2013	Scottsdale, Arizona	United States	?		67	23	34.33%

== See also ==
- ICML
- NeurIPS
- AAAI Conference on Artificial Intelligence
