= Conference on Neural Information Processing Systems =

Machine-learning and computational-neuroscience conference

- Abbreviation: NeurIPS (formerly NIPS)
- Discipline: Machine learning, statistics, artificial intelligence, computational neuroscience

Publication details
- History: 1987–present
- Frequency: Annual
- Website: neurips.cc

The Conference on Neural Information Processing Systems (abbreviated as NeurIPS and formerly NIPS) is a machine learning and computational neuroscience conference held annually in December. Along with ICLR and ICML, it is one of the three primary conferences of high impact in machine learning and artificial intelligence research.

The conference includes three days of invited talks along with oral and poster presentations of refereed papers, followed by two days of workshops and competitions.

== History ==
The NeurIPS meeting was first proposed in 1986 at the annual invitation-only Snowbird Meeting on Neural Networks for Computing organized by The California Institute of Technology and Bell Laboratories. NeurIPS was designed as a complementary open interdisciplinary meeting for researchers exploring biological and artificial Neural Networks. Reflecting this multidisciplinary approach, NeurIPS began in 1987 with information theorist Ed Posner as the conference president and learning theorist Yaser Abu-Mostafa as program chairman. Research presented in the early NeurIPS meetings included a wide range of topics from efforts to solve purely engineering problems to the use of computer models as a tool for understanding biological nervous systems. Since then, the biological and artificial systems research streams have diverged, and recent NeurIPS proceedings have been dominated by papers on machine learning, artificial intelligence and statistics.

From 1987 until 2000 NeurIPS was held in Denver, United States. Since then, the conference was held in Vancouver, Canada (2001–2010), Granada, Spain (2011), and Lake Tahoe, United States (2012–2013). In 2014 and 2015, the conference was held in Montreal, Canada, in Barcelona, Spain in 2016, in Long Beach, United States in 2017, in Montreal, Canada in 2018 and Vancouver, Canada in 2019. Reflecting its origins at Snowbird, Utah, the meeting was accompanied by workshops organized at a nearby ski resort up until 2013, when it outgrew ski resorts.

The first NeurIPS Conference was sponsored by the IEEE. The following NeurIPS Conferences have been organized by the NeurIPS Foundation, established by Ed Posner. Terrence Sejnowski has been the president of the NeurIPS Foundation since Posner's death in 1993. The board of trustees consists of previous general chairs of the NeurIPS Conference.

The first proceedings was published in book form by the American Institute of Physics in 1987, and was entitled Neural Information Processing Systems, then the proceedings from the following conferences have been published by Morgan Kaufmann (1988–1993), MIT Press (1994–2004) and Curran Associates (2005–present) under the name Advances in Neural Information Processing Systems.

The conference was originally abbreviated as "NIPS". By 2018 a few commentators were criticizing the abbreviation as encouraging sexism due to its association with the word nipples, and as being a slur against Japanese. The board changed the abbreviation to "NeurIPS" in November 2018.

== Topics ==
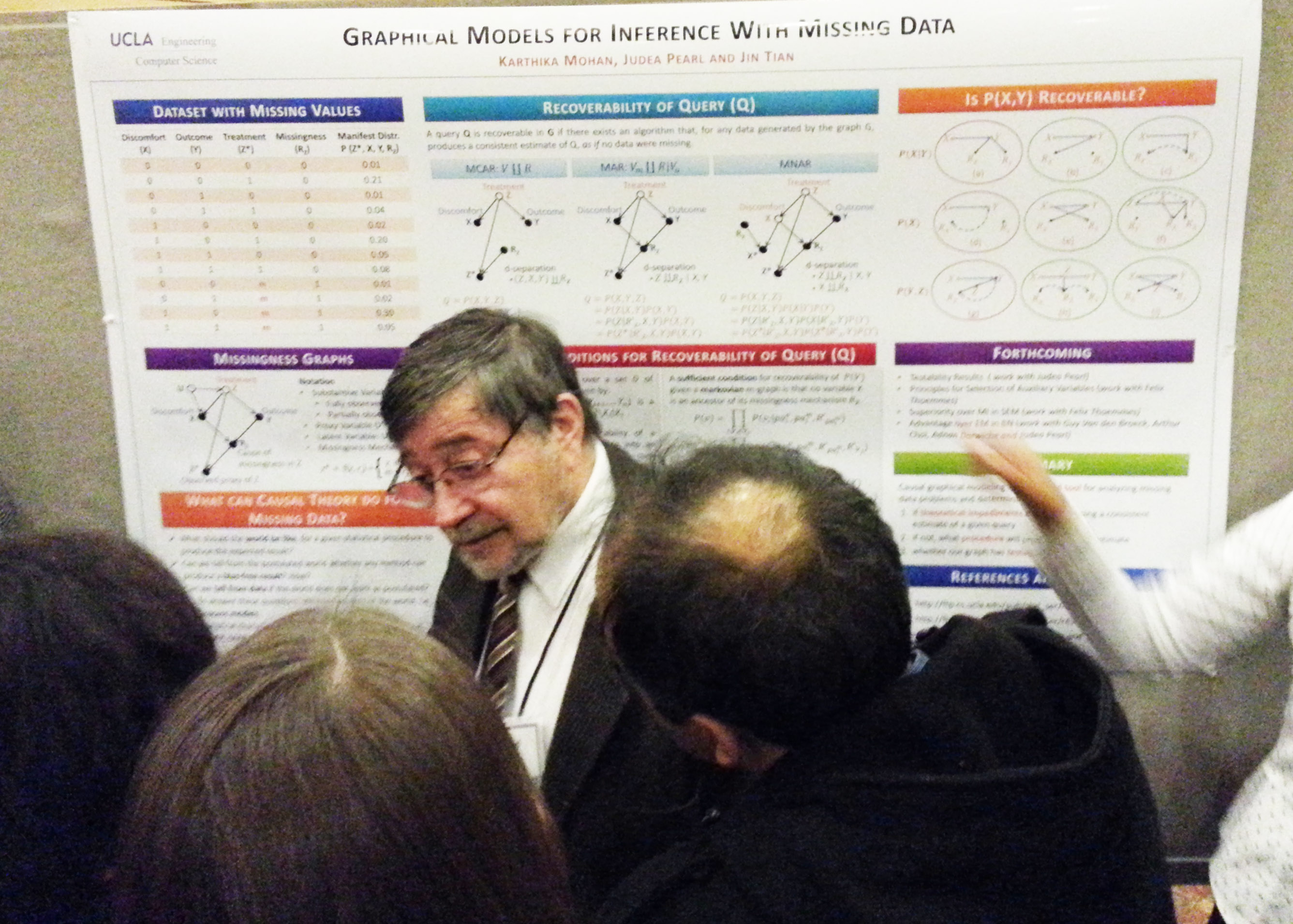
Judea Pearl at his poster at the 2013 Conference on Neural Information Processing Systems

Along with machine learning and neuroscience, other fields represented at NeurIPS include cognitive science, psychology, computer vision, statistical linguistics, and information theory. Over the years, NeurIPS became a premier conference on machine learning and although the 'Neural' in the NeurIPS acronym had become something of a historical relic, the resurgence of deep learning in neural networks since 2012, fueled by faster computers and big data, has led to achievements in speech recognition, object recognition in images, image captioning, language translation and world championship performance in the game of Go, based on neural architectures inspired by the hierarchy of areas in the visual cortex (ConvNet) and reinforcement learning inspired by the basal ganglia (Temporal difference learning).

Notable affinity groups have emerged from the NeurIPS conference and displayed diversity, including Black in AI (in 2017), Queer in AI (in 2016), and others.

=== Named lectures ===
In addition to invited talks and symposia, NeurIPS also organizes two named lectureships to recognize distinguished researchers. The NeurIPS Board introduced the Posner Lectureship in honor of NeurIPS founder Ed Posner; two Posner Lectures were given each year up to 2015. Past lecturers have included:

- 2010 – Josh Tenenbaum and Michael I. Jordan
- 2011 – Rich Sutton and Bernhard Schölkopf
- 2012 – Thomas Dietterich and Terry Sejnowski
- 2013 – Daphne Koller and Peter Dayan
- 2014 – Michael Kearns and John Hopfield
- 2015 – Zoubin Ghahramani and Vladimir Vapnik
- 2016 – Yann LeCun
- 2017 – John Platt
- 2018 – Joëlle Pineau
- 2019 – Yoshua Bengio
- 2020 – Christopher Bishop
- 2021 – Peter Bartlett

In 2015, the NeurIPS Board introduced the Breiman Lectureship to highlight work in statistics relevant to conference topics. The lectureship was named for statistician Leo Breiman, who served on the NeurIPS Board from 1994 to 2005. Past lecturers have included:

- 2015 – Robert Tibshirani
- 2016 – Susan Holmes
- 2017 – Yee Whye Teh
- 2018 – David Spiegelhalter
- 2019 – Bin Yu
- 2020 – Marloes Maathuis
- 2021 – Gabor Lugosi
- 2022 – Emmanuel Candes
- 2023 – Susan Murphy
- 2024 – Arnaud Doucet

== NeurIPS consistency experiment ==
In NIPS 2014, the program chairs duplicated 10% of all submissions and sent them through separate reviewers to evaluate randomness in the reviewing process. Several researchers interpreted the result. Regarding whether the decision in NIPS is completely random or not, John Langford writes: "Clearly not—a purely random decision would have arbitrariness of ~78%. It is, however, quite notable that 60% is much closer to 78% than 0%." He concludes that the result of the reviewing process is mostly arbitrary. In NeurIPS 2021, the program chairs repeated the 2014 experiment and found similar levels of review inconsistency; 23% of duplicated submissions received different accept/reject decisions, and 50.6% of accepted papers would have been rejected under re-review.

== Locations ==
- 1987–2000: Denver, Colorado, United States
- 2001–2010: Vancouver, British Columbia, Canada
- 2011: Granada, Spain
- 2012 & 2013: Stateline, Nevada, United States
- 2014 & 2015: Montréal, Quebec, Canada
- 2016: Barcelona, Spain
- 2017: Long Beach, California, United States
- 2018: Montréal, Quebec, Canada
- 2019: Vancouver, British Columbia, Canada
- 2020: Vancouver, British Columbia, Canada (virtual conference)
- 2021: Virtual conference
- 2022 & 2023: New Orleans, Louisiana, United States
- 2024: Vancouver, British Columbia, Canada
- 2025: San Diego, California, United States and Mexico City, Mexico
- 2026: Sydney, New South Wales, Australia, with satellite events in Atlanta and Paris

== See also ==
- AAAI Conference on Artificial Intelligence (AAAI)
- Computational and Systems Neuroscience (COSYNE)
- International Conference on Computational Intelligence Methods for Bioinformatics and Biostatistics (CIBB)
- International Conference on Learning Representations (ICLR)
- International Conference on Machine Learning (ICML)
