= Boston Public Library =

Library system in Massachusetts, US

- Motto: Omnium Lux Civium (Latin) "The Light of All People"
- 42°20′57.55″N 71°4′41.78″W
- Location: Boston, Massachusetts, US
- Type: Public
- Established: 1848
- Branches: 24

Collection
- Size: 24,079,520

Access and use
- Circulation: 7.6 million (FY 2025)
- Population served: 6,547,629

Other information
- Budget: $49.5 million (FY 2026)
- Director: David Leonard (president); Ray Liu (chair of the board)
- Affiliation: Boston Library Consortium
- Public transit access: Copley
- Website: bpl.org

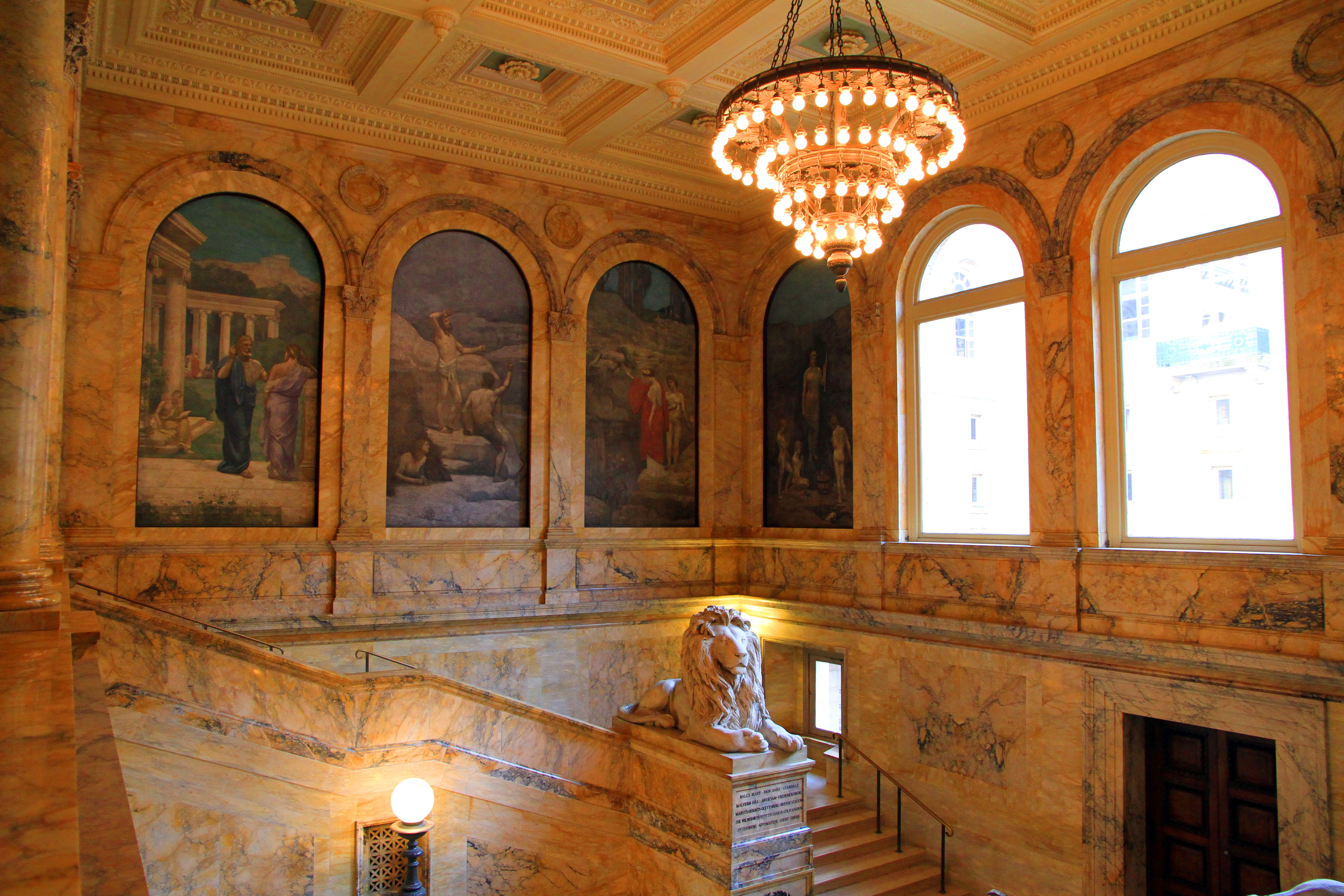
The Chavannes Gallery at the McKim Building with murals painted by Pierre Puvis de Chavannes

The Boston Public Library (BPL) is a municipal public library system in Boston, Massachusetts, United States, founded in 1848. The Boston Public Library is also Massachusetts' Library for the Commonwealth (formerly library of last recourse), meaning all adult residents of the state are entitled to borrowing and research privileges, and the library receives state funding. The Boston Public Library contains approximately 24 million items, making it the third-largest public library in the United States behind the federal Library of Congress and New York Public Library, which is also privately endowed. The Boston Central Library in Copley Square was designated as a Boston Landmark by the Boston Landmarks Commission in 2000.

== Overview ==
Boston Public Library has a collection of more than 23.7 million items, which makes it one of the largest municipal public library systems in the United States. The vast majority of the collection—over 22.7 million volumes—is held in the Central Branch research stacks. In fiscal year 2025, the total circulation of the BPL was 7.6 million, split between a digital circulation of 5.4 million and a physical circulation of 2.2 million. Because of the strength and importance of its research collection, the Boston Public Library is a member of the Association of Research Libraries (ARL), a not-for-profit organization comprising the research libraries of North America. The New York Public Library is the only other public library that is a member of the ARL, and it also has a private endowment. The library has established collections of distinction, based on the collection's depth and breadth, including subjects such as Boston history, the Civil War, Irish history, etc. In addition, the library is both a federal and state depository of government documents.

Included in the BPL's research collection are more than 1.7 million rare books and manuscripts. It possesses wide-ranging and important holdings, including medieval manuscripts and incunabula; early editions of William Shakespeare (among which are a number of Shakespeare quartos and the First Folio); the George Ticknor collection of Spanish literature, a major collection of Daniel Defoe; records of colonial Boston; the personal 3,800 volume library of John Adams; the mathematical and astronomical library of Nathaniel Bowditch; important manuscript archives on abolitionism, including the papers of William Lloyd Garrison; and a major collection of materials on the Sacco and Vanzetti case. There are large collections of prints, photographs, postcards, and maps. The library, for example, holds one of the major collections of watercolors and drawings by Thomas Rowlandson. The library has a special strength in music, and holds the archives of the Handel and Haydn Society, scores from the estate of Serge Koussevitzky, and the papers of and grand piano belonging to the important American composer Walter Piston.

For all these reasons, the historian David McCullough has described the Boston Public Library as one of the five most important libraries in the United States, the others being the federal Library of Congress, the New York Public Library, and the university libraries of Harvard and Yale.

Digital Commonwealth provides access to materials of historical interest that have been digitized from across Massachusetts, supported by the Boston Public Library through the Library for the Commonwealth program.

== History ==
=== Founding and expansion ===
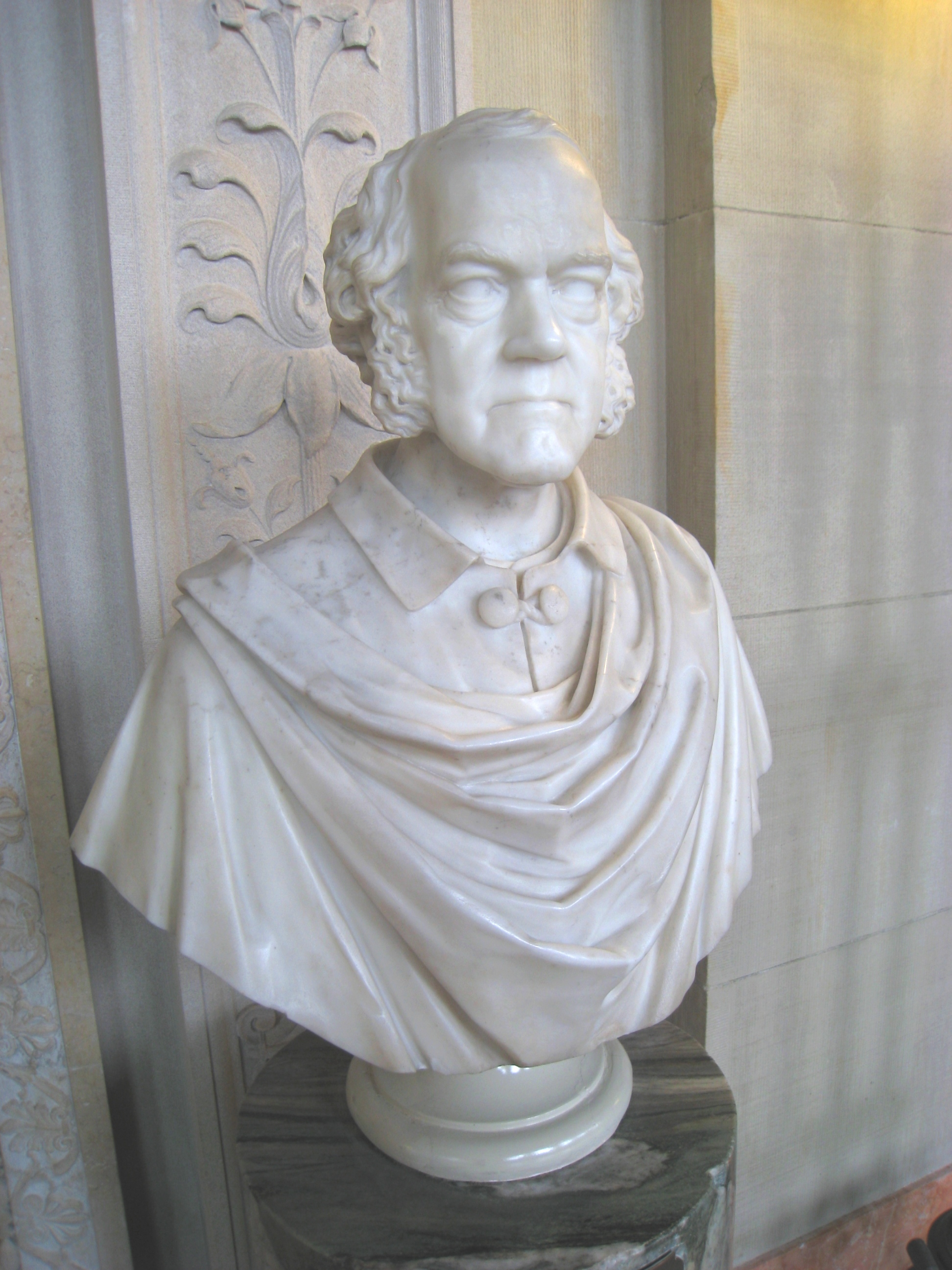
Bust of George Ticknor

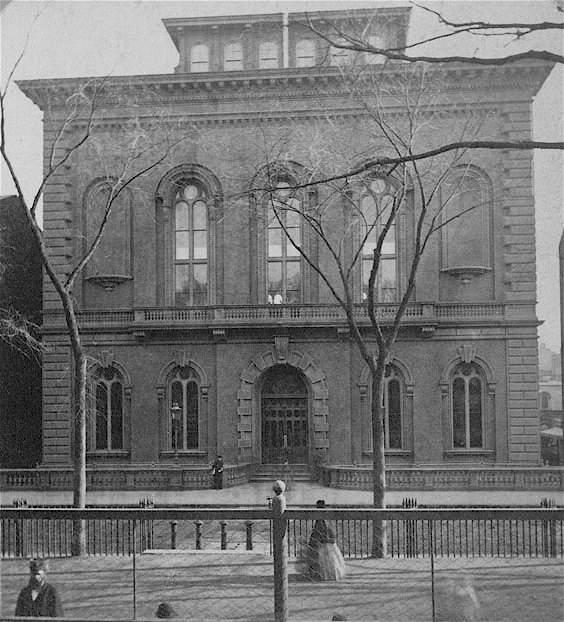
The Boston Public Library on Boylston Street, which was open between 1858 and 1895 and was demolished 1899

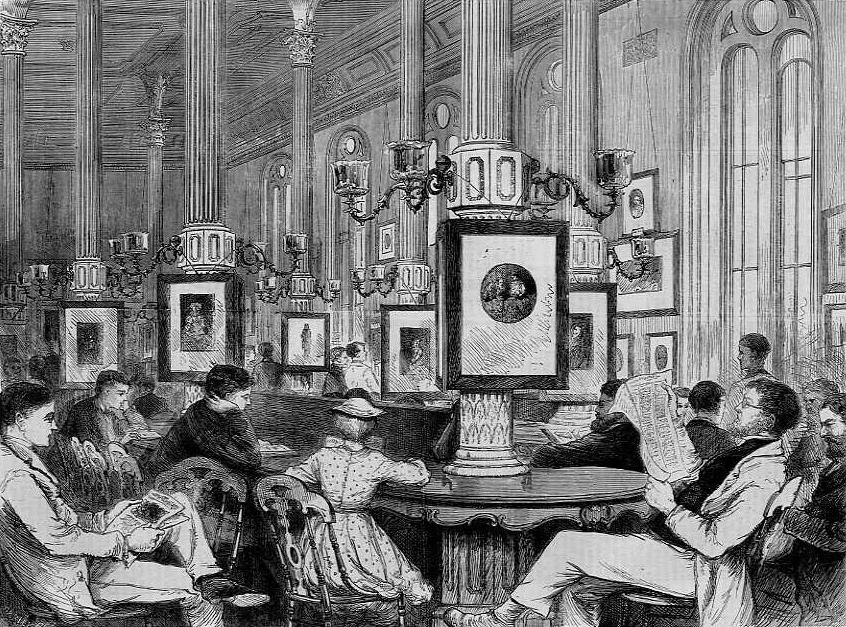
The library's reading room in 1871 at the first Boylston Street building

=== 19th century ===
In the mid-19th century, several people were instrumental in the establishment of the Boston Public Library. George Ticknor, a Harvard University professor and trustee of the Boston Athenaeum, proposed establishing a public library in Boston beginning as early as 1826. At the time, Ticknor could not generate enough interest.

In 1839, Alexandre Vattemare, a French philanthropist, suggested that all of Boston's libraries combine into one institution for the benefit of the public. The idea was presented to many Boston libraries, however, most were uninterested in the idea. At Vattemare's urging, Paris sent gifts of books in 1843 and 1847 to assist in establishing a unified public library. Vattemare made yet another gift of books in 1849.

Josiah Quincy Jr. anonymously donated $5,000 to begin funding a new library. Quincy made the donation while he was mayor of Boston. Indirectly, John Jacob Astor, businessman and philanthropist, also influenced the establishment of a public library in Boston. At the time of his death, Astor bequeathed $400,000 to New York to establish a public library there. Because of the cultural and economic rivalry between Boston and New York, this bequest prompted more discussion of establishing a public library in Boston. In 1848, a statute of the Great and General Court of Massachusetts enabled the creation of the library. The library was officially established in Boston by a city ordinance in 1852. Mayor Benjamin Seaver recommended to the city council that a librarian be appointed. In May 1852 the city council adopted the recommendations of the mayor and Edward Capen was chosen to become Boston Public Library's first librarian.

Eager to support the library, Edward Everett collected documents from both houses of Congress, bound them at his own expense, and offered this collection to help establish the new library. At the time of Everett's donation, George Ticknor became involved in the active planning for the new library. In 1852, financier Joshua Bates gave a gift of $50,000 to establish a library in Boston. After Bates' gift was received, Ticknor made lists of what books to purchase. He traveled extensively to purchase books for the library, visit other libraries, and set up book agencies.

To house the collection, a former schoolhouse located on Mason Street was selected as the library's first home. On March 20, 1854, the Reading Room of the Boston Public Library officially opened to the public. The circulation department opened on May 2, 1854.

The opening day collection of 16,000 volumes fit in the Mason Street building, but it quickly became obvious that its quarters were inadequate. So in December 1854, the library's commissioners authorized the library to move to a new building on Boylston Street. Designed by Charles Kirk Kirby to hold 240,000 volumes, the imposing Italianate edifice opened in 1858. Eventually the library outgrew that building as well; in 1878, an examining committee recommended replacing it with a new one at another location.

In 1870, the library opened the East Boston branch, the first branch library in the United States. With the aim of increasing its reach throughout the city and providing services to residents everywhere, the library opened 21 more branches in Boston neighborhoods between 1872 and 1900.

By 1880, the Massachusetts legislature authorized construction of an even grander library building. A site selected was in Back Bay on Copley Square, the prominent corner of Boylston Street and Dartmouth Street, opposite Richardson's Trinity Church and near the first Boston Museum of Fine Arts. After several years of debate over the selection of the architects and architectural style for the new library, in 1887 the prestigious New York firm of McKim, Mead, and White was chosen to design the new library. In 1888, Charles Follen McKim proposed a Renaissance style design based on the Bibliothèque Ste-Geneviève in Paris. The trustees of the library approved, and construction commenced. The vast new reading room was called Bates Hall.

=== 20th century ===
In 1972, the Boylston Street Building, previously referred to as the Johnson Building, opened at the central Copley Square location, adjacent to the McKim Building. The Boylston Street addition was designed by American architect Philip Johnson. In 1986, the National Park Service designated the McKim Building as a National Historic Landmark.

=== 21st century ===
As of 2006, the Library has had staffing and funding levels for conservation below that of its peers: the BPL's staff of two full-time conservators is significantly less than the thirty-five employed at the New York Public Library. Many colonial records and John Adams manuscripts are brittle, decaying, and so in need of attention that the Library's acting Keeper of Rare Books and Manuscripts said that "they are falling apart."

In 2011, the library completed a strategic plan, the BPL Compass, which featured eight community-identified "Principles for Excellence". The principles in the plan and all of the related outcomes were the result of a two-year community engagement process for which Boston Public Library received national recognition.

In 2012, the city of Boston spent 1.26% ($27,836,648) of its budget on the library, or $43.74 per person.

In 2013, the library unveiled its Collections of Distinction, an initial group of 18 collections that represent the most outstanding, expansive, and renowned of its holdings. Boston Public Library gives priority to Collections of Distinction with respect to public access, acquisition, digitization, preservation, and staff development.

In fall 2013, the city, in coordination with the library, began a renovation of the Central Library's Boylston Street Building. In February 2015, the first phase of renovation opened on the Boylston Street Building's second floor, including the new Children's Library, Teen Central, a community reading area, and the Adult Reference area. The renovated second floor cost a total of $18 million. The second phase of the Boylston Street Building renovations opened in the summer 2016 and included the first floor, mezzanine, and exterior.

In 2017, the Boston Public Library received joint awards from both the American Institute of Architects (AIA) and the American Library Association (ALA) for the Central Library Renovation of its Boylston Street Building, and for the East Boston Branch.

In 2017, the library had 3,818,883 visitors to all locations; 4,933,786 items borrowed; and 9,839,461 visits to its website. The library also gained 82,911 new library card holders.

In 2019, supporters of the library established a new philanthropic fund: The Fund for the Boston Public Library, announced by Mayor Marty Walsh. It began with a $2.8 million investment by "Bank of America Charitable Foundation, Barr Foundation, The Boston Foundation, Liberty Mutual Foundation, State Street Foundation, Inc. and an anonymous donor."

In response to the COVID-19 pandemic, all branches of the library temporarily closed starting on March 16, 2020. The library began offering limited in-person services in June of that year and reopened to the public in June 2021.

=== Presidents ===
Presidents of the Boston Public Library
President	Term	Length	Ref.
Bernard A. Margolis	1997 – 2008		
Amy E. Ryan	October 1, 2008 – July 3, 2015	18 years, 1 month, and 14 days	
David Leonard	June 14, 2016 – Present	10 years, 5 months, and 1 day	

== Central Library ==
The Boston Central Library is located in Copley Square in Boston's Back Bay neighborhood. The central library consists of the McKim Building and the Boylston Street Building, which are attached and interconnected with interior passageways. The Central Library as a whole with the two buildings combined contains 930,000 square feet (86,000 m^{2}) of space and houses 21 million items in its collections as of 2015.

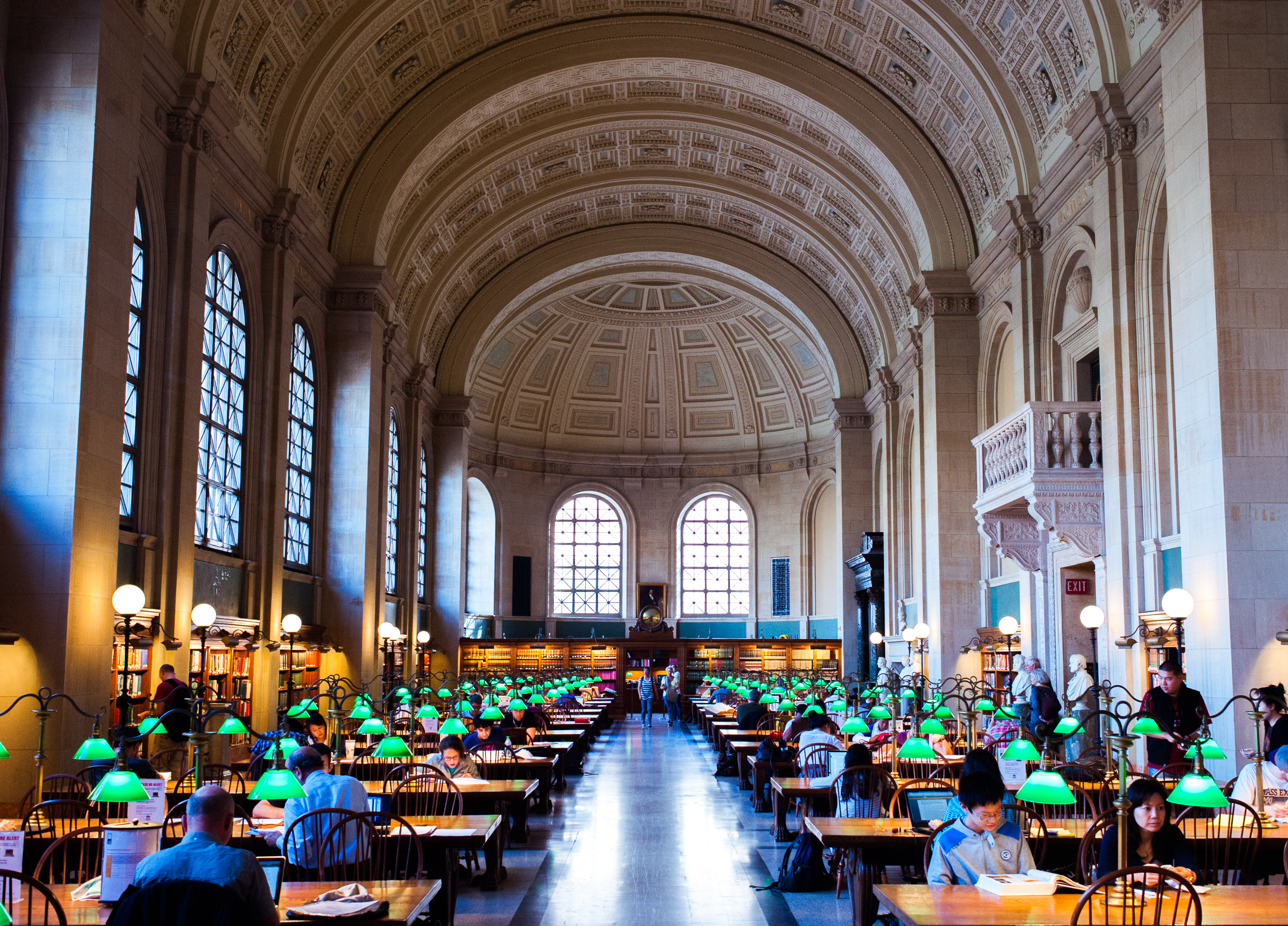
Bates Hall in the McKim Building in 2013

The McKim Building, designed by Charles Follen McKim and completed in 1895, houses the BPL's research collection. The Boylston Street Building, designed by Philip Johnson and completed in 1972, reflects similar proportions, and is built of the same pink Milford granite as the McKim Building. The Boylston Street Building underwent renovation in 2016, transforming the space into an open layout. Boylston Street Building is the home for the Boston Public Library's main circulating collection, which includes works in many languages. It also serves as headquarters for the Boston Public Library's 24 branch libraries.

== Current services ==
=== Public programs ===
The Boston Public Library, in its remit and logo, hosts thousands of free public programs each year, including Author Talks, Local and Family History lectures, the Lowell Lecture Series, Concerts in the Courtyard, and art and history exhibitions. The Boston Public Library also offers many daily events for children, teens, adults, and seniors, including story times, therapy dog story times, book discussions, film showings, ESL conversation groups, and research and technology classes.

=== Computers and Internet access ===
The Boston Public Library offers desktop computers with pay-for-print services for public use and wireless internet at the Central Library and all 24 branches for anyone who has a wireless-enabled mobile device. Plug-in Ethernet access is also available in the McKim Building's Bates Hall and the Honan-Allston Branch's Adult Reading Room for up to 2 hours. Library-card holders can borrow laptops for in-library use.

=== Digital services ===
The library offers a variety of digital services and collections. The online catalog, also available for mobile devices, allows users to browse and place holds on materials including books, audiobooks, DVDs, and CDs. Users can also download ebooks, e-audiobooks, music, and video through BPL's OverDrive site and check out Zinio magazines for the computer, tablet, or smartphone. Though parental supervision is recommended for children and teenagers, streaming movies, television shows, music, and audiobooks are available to library card holders and e-card holders can through Hoopla Streaming Media.

Many of the Boston Public Library's collections are available to the public online, including rare books and manuscripts, the slavery debate manuscript collection, historical children's books, the John Adams Library, historic maps from the Norman B. Leventhal Map Center, historical images, prints, and photographs, sound archives, and silent films. Many of the library's digitized works can be found either through the Boston Public Library Flickr page or through their collections on the Digital Commonwealth.

=== List of databases ===
As of August 2017, the library arranges for its patrons access to digital content from several providers:

List of databases

Title	Parent company	Subsidiary
17th & 18th Century Burney Collection Newspapers	Cengage Learning, Inc.	Gale
18th Century Collections Online	Cengage Learning, Inc.	Gale
19th Century Collections Online	Cengage Learning, Inc.	Gale
19th Century US Newspapers	Cengage Learning, Inc.	Gale
Academic OneFile	Cengage Learning, Inc.	Gale
American Doctoral Dissertations	EBSCO Industries	
American Music	Alexander Street Press	
AP Images	EBSCO Industries	
Archive Finder	Cambridge Information Group	ProQuest
Archives Unbound	Cengage Learning, Inc.	Gale
Art Full Text	EBSCO Industries	
Art Index Retrospective	EBSCO Industries	
Art Museum Image Gallery	EBSCO Industries	
Arts:Search	Cambridge Information Group	ProQuest
Asian American Drama	Alexander Street Press	
AtoZdatabases	DatabaseUSA.com	
Audio Drama: The L.A. Theatre Works Collection	Alexander Street Press	
Avery Index to Architectural Periodicals	EBSCO Industries	
Biography and Genealogy Master Index	Cengage Learning, Inc.	Gale
Biography in Context	Cengage Learning, Inc.	Gale
Black Drama, Second Edition	Alexander Street Press	
Boston Globe	Cambridge Information Group	ProQuest
Boston Herald, 2004-2011	Cengage Learning, Inc.	Gale
Britannica Learning Zone	Encyclopædia Britannica, Inc.	
Britannica Library	Encyclopædia Britannica, Inc.	
Britannica School Edition	Encyclopædia Britannica, Inc.	
Britannica Spanish Reference Center	Encyclopædia Britannica, Inc.	
British Library Newspapers	Cengage Learning, Inc.	Gale
British Literary Manuscripts Online	Cengage Learning, Inc.	Gale
Business & Industry	Cengage Learning, Inc.	Gale
Business and Management Practices	Cengage Learning, Inc.	Gale
Business Collection	Cengage Learning, Inc.	Gale
Career Transitions	Cengage Learning, Inc.	Gale
Children's Reference	Cengage Learning, Inc.	Gale
Classical Music Library	Alexander Street Press	
Classical Scores Library	Alexander Street Press	
Congressional	Cambridge Information Group	ProQuest
Contemporary World Music	Alexander Street Press	
Credo Reference	Credo Reference Ltd.	
Criminal Justice Collection	Cengage Learning, Inc.	Gale
Culinary Arts Collection	Cengage Learning, Inc.	Gale
Dance in Video	Alexander Street Press	
DemographicsNow: Business and People	Cengage Learning, Inc.	Gale
Economist Historical Archive	Cengage Learning, Inc.	Gale
Educator's Reference Complete	Cengage Learning, Inc.	Gale
Environmental Studies and Policy Collection	Cengage Learning, Inc.	Gale
Expanded Academic ASAP	Cengage Learning, Inc.	Gale
Financial Times Historical Archive	Cengage Learning, Inc.	Gale
Gale Courses	Cengage Learning, Inc.	Gale
Gale Directory Library	Cengage Learning, Inc.	Gale
Gale Newsvault	Cengage Learning, Inc.	Gale
Gale Virtual Reference Library	Cengage Learning, Inc.	Gale
Gardening, Landscape, and Horticulture Collection	Cengage Learning, Inc.	Gale
Garland Encyclopedia of World Music Online	Alexander Street Press	
General OneFile	Cengage Learning, Inc.	Gale
Global Issues In Context	Cengage Learning, Inc.	Gale
Health & Wellness Resource Center	Cengage Learning, Inc.	Gale
Health Reference Center Academic	Cengage Learning, Inc.	Gale
HeritageQuest Online	Cambridge Information Group	ProQuest
Hoopla Streaming Media	Midwest Tape, LLC	
Hospitality, Tourism, and Leisure Collection	Cengage Learning, Inc.	Gale
Index to Early American Periodicals	Computer Indexed Systems	
Index to English Literary Periodicals	Computer Indexed Systems	
Infotrac Junior Edition	Cengage Learning, Inc.	Gale
Infotrac Newsstand	Cengage Learning, Inc.	Gale
Infotrac Student Edition	Cengage Learning, Inc.	Gale
Irish Times	Cambridge Information Group	ProQuest
Jazz Music Library	Alexander Street Press	
Jewish Advocate	Cambridge Information Group	ProQuest
JSTOR	Ithaka Harbors	
Kids InfoBits	Cengage Learning, Inc.	Gale
Latino Literature	Alexander Street Press	
LearningExpress Library	EBSCO Industries	
Library, Information Science & Technology Abstracts	EBSCO Industries	
Listener History Archive	Cengage Learning, Inc.	Gale
Literature Criticism Online	Cengage Learning, Inc.	Gale
Literature Resource Center	Cengage Learning, Inc.	Gale
Little Pim	Creative Empire, LLC	Mango Languages
Lynda.com	Microsoft Corporation	
Making of the Modern World	Cengage Learning, Inc.	Gale
Mango Languages	Creative Empire, LLC	
Massachusetts Driving Permit Practice Tests	Elegant E-Learning, Inc	Driving-Tests.org
Mergent Archives - Historical Annual Report Collection	London Stock Exchange Group	Mergent, Inc.
Mergent EventsData	London Stock Exchange Group	Mergent, Inc.
Mergent Intellect	London Stock Exchange Group	Mergent, Inc.
Mergent Online	London Stock Exchange Group	Mergent, Inc.
Modern Language Association (MLA) International Bibliography	Cengage Learning, Inc.	Gale
Morningstar Investment Research Center	Morningstar, Inc.	
Music & Performing Arts	Alexander Street Press	
National Geographic Virtual Library	Cengage Learning, Inc.	Gale
The New York Times (1851-2013)	Cambridge Information Group	ProQuest
The New York Times (1985–Present)	Cengage Learning, Inc.	Gale
Newspaper Archive	Heritage Microfilm, Inc.	
North American Indian Drama	Alexander Street Press	
North American Women's Drama	Alexander Street Press	
NoveList K-8 Plus	EBSCO Industries	
NoveList Plus	EBSCO Industries	
Nursing & Allied Health Collection	Cengage Learning, Inc.	Gale
OmniFile Full Text Select	EBSCO Industries	
Opera in Video	Alexander Street Press	
OverDrive eBooks, Audio Books, and Music	Rakuten, Inc.	OverDrive, Inc.
Oxford Art Online	University of Oxford	Oxford University Press
Oxford English Dictionary	University of Oxford	Oxford University Press
Oxford Music Online	University of Oxford	Oxford University Press
Physical Therapy and Sports Medicine Collection	Cengage Learning, Inc.	Gale
Popular Music Library	Alexander Street Press	
PressReader	NewspaperDirect Inc.	
Primary Sources	Cengage Learning, Inc.	Gale
Readers' Guide Retrospective	EBSCO Industries	
RISM International Inventory of Musical Sources	EBSCO Industries	
Sabin Americana, 1500–1926	Cengage Learning, Inc.	Gale
Science in Context	Cengage Learning, Inc.	Gale
Slavery and Anti-Slavery	Cengage Learning, Inc.	Gale
Slavery in America and the World	William S. Hein & Co., Inc.	HeinOnline
Small Business Collection	Cengage Learning, Inc.	Gale
Smithsonian Collections Online	Cengage Learning, Inc.	Gale
Smithsonian Global Sound	Alexander Street Press	
Statistical Abstract of the U.S.	Cambridge Information Group	ProQuest
Statistical Insight	Cambridge Information Group	ProQuest
Sunday Times (London) Digital Archive	Cengage Learning, Inc.	Gale
Tablebase	Cengage Learning, Inc.	Gale
Theatre in Video	Alexander Street Press	
Times (London) Digital Archive	Cengage Learning, Inc.	Gale
Twentieth Century North American Drama	Alexander Street Press	
US History in Context	Cengage Learning, Inc.	Gale
Value Line	Value Line, Inc.	
Vocations and Careers Collection	Cengage Learning, Inc.	Gale
World History in Context	Cengage Learning, Inc.	Gale
Zinio Digital Magazines	Zinio LLC	

=== Digital partners ===
Boston Public Library has two digital partners-in-residence at the Central Library in Copley Square. The first is Internet Archive, a nonprofit digital library that offers permanent access to historical collections in digital format for researchers, historians, and the general public. The Digital Public Library of America provides access to digital content from American libraries, archives, museums, and historical societies.

== Branch library system ==
In the latter half of the 19th century, the library worked vigorously to develop and expand its branch library system. Viewed as a means to extend its presence throughout the city, the branch system evolved from an idea in 1867 to a reality in 1870, when the first branch library in the United States was opened in East Boston. The library currently has 25 branches serving diverse populations in the city's neighborhoods.

- Chinatown, Boston
  - Chinatown Branch, 2 Boylston Street. After lacking a local branch for 60 years, a temporary branch opened in the China Trade Center in February 2018 as a result of community activism. Prior to this, it had been served until the 1950s by a branch at 118 Tyler Street.
- North End, Boston
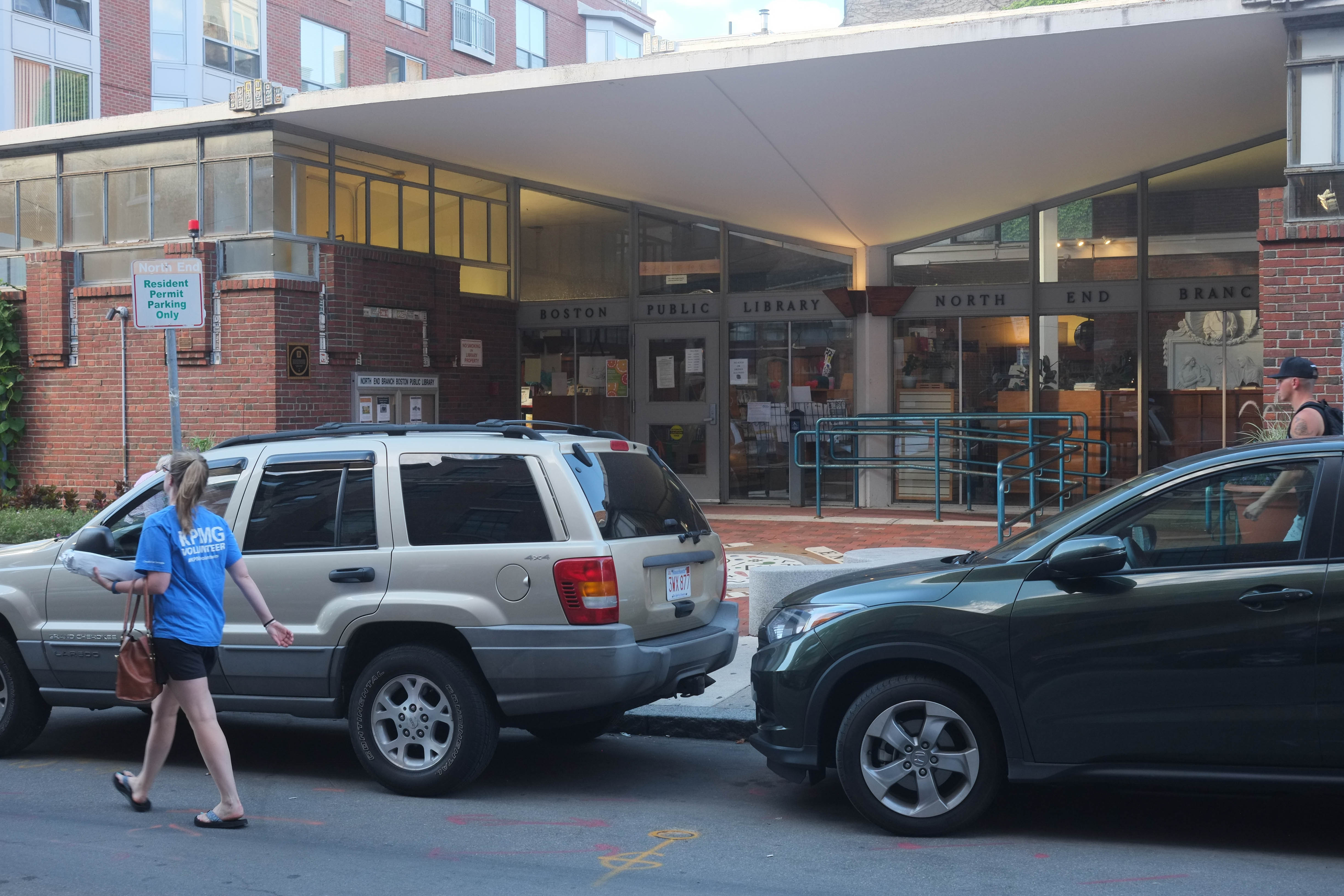
  North End Branch, 2016.
  - North End Branch, 25 Parmenter Street. A delivery station was first opened in 1882. In 1913 the branch was located at 3A North Bennett Street. In 1965 it moved to its current building, designed by Carl Koch and Associates.
- South End, Boston
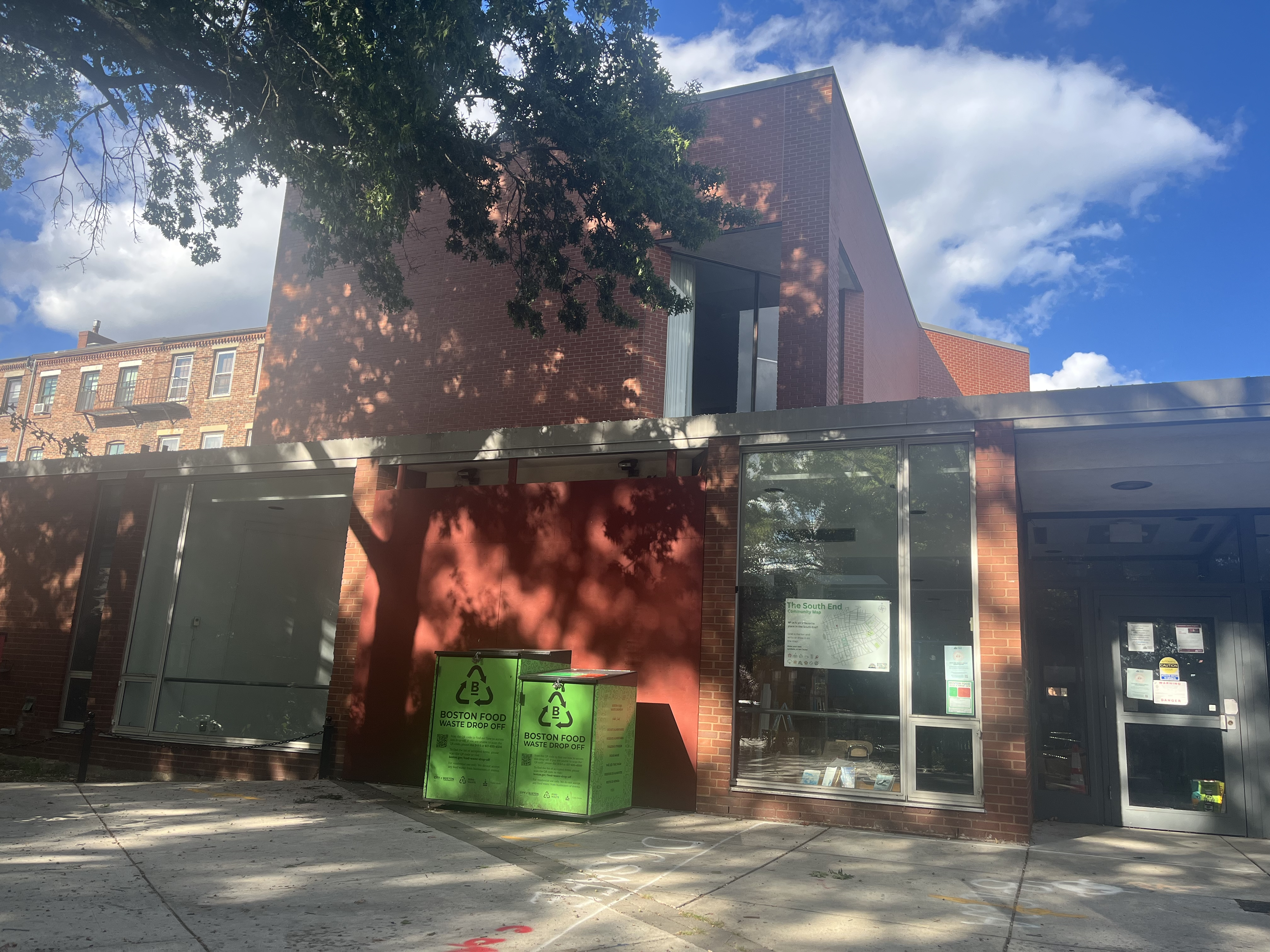
  South End branch, 2025
  - South End Branch, 685 Tremont Street. "Library service was established in the South End in 1877. The Branch was located in the Mercantile Library Association until 1879 when it was moved to the English High School. In 1904 the Branch relocated to 397 Shawmut Avenue and then again in 1923 to the John J. Williams Municipal Building at Shawmut Avenue and West Brookline Street. On June 7, 1971 the South End Branch Library moved to a new building at its present location, which was on the site of the original Mercantile building." The branch closed in April 2022 after severe flooding, and the library system made plans to replace it.
- West End, Boston
  - West End Branch, 151 Cambridge Street. "Library service in the West End was initiated in 1894 with the conversion of the Old West Church on the corner of Cambridge and Lynde Streets to library use. The West End Branch opened in February 1896. The West End Redevelopment Project necessitated closing the Branch in 1960. As part of the project a new building designed by Maginnis, Walsh and Kennedy opened in January 1968."
- Brighton
  Brighton Branch, Brighton, 2024
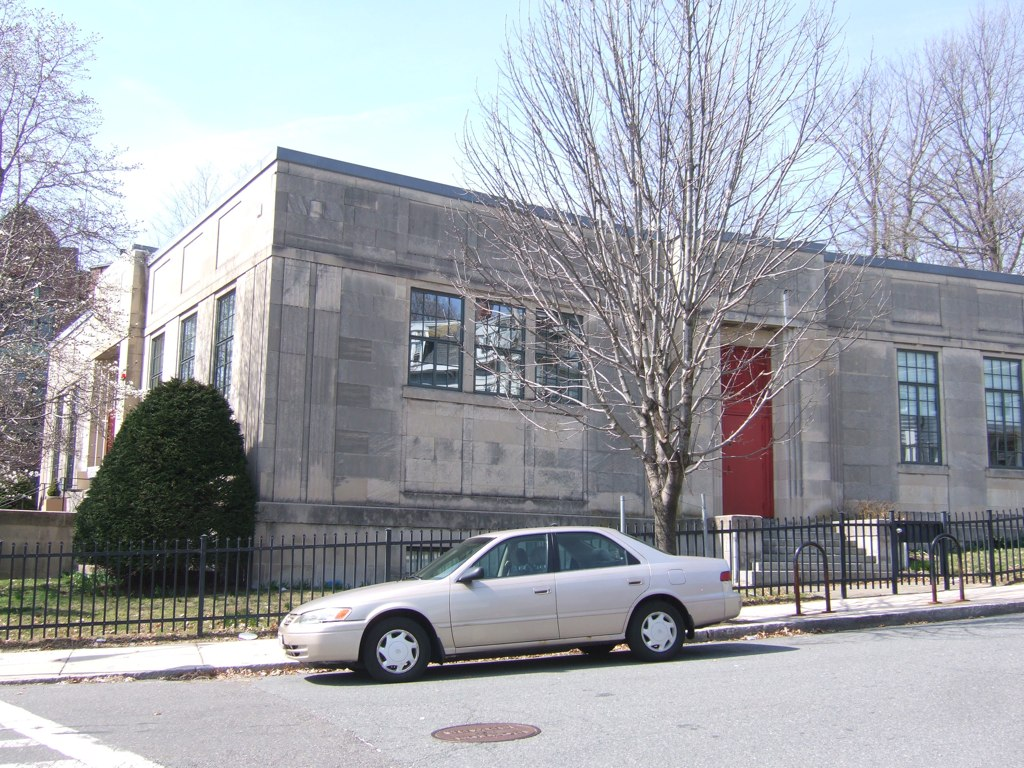
  Faneuil Branch, Brighton, 2010
  - Brighton Branch, 40 Academy Hill Road, Brighton. Branch service in Brighton began when the town was annexed to the city of Boston in 1874 and the Brighton Social Library became part of the Boston Public Library. That year also saw the collection move from the former town hall to a new library building named for James Holton, a prominent Brighton resident. A new branch building opened on the same location in 1969. In 2018, the library reopened after undergoing extensive renovations for almost two years.
  - Faneuil Branch, 419 Faneuil Street, Brighton. Located in Oak Square, the art-deco style building replaced a temporary location on nearby Brooks Street in 1931. In 2020, the branch temporarily closed for extensive renovations. It was expected to reopen by the end of 2022 but the reopening was delayed until January 2024. This building is currently under consideration for Boston Landmark status by the Boston Landmarks Commission.
    Faneuil Branch, Brighton, 2026

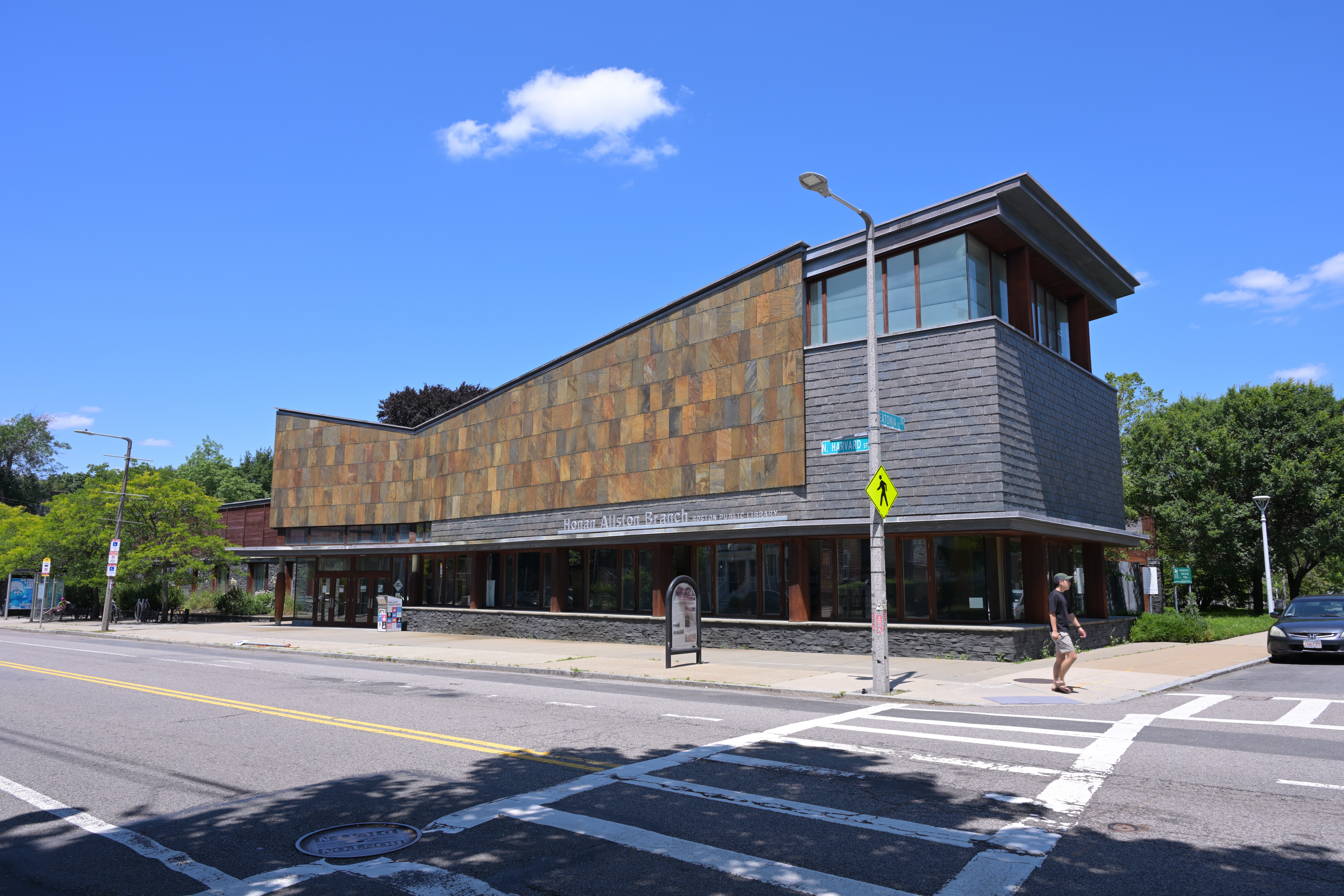
Honan-Allston Branch, 2025

- Allston
  - Honan-Allston Branch, 300 North Harvard Street, Allston. "Allston's library service began in 1889 in a delivery station in Frank Howe's drugstore at 26 Franklin Street. ... In 1905, the Allston Reading Room at 354 Cambridge Street replaced the 16-year-old delivery station. A BPL librarian staffed the reading room. It became a full-service branch of the Boston Public Library in 1924. The branch moved to rented space at 161 Harvard Avenue in 1929. ... In 1981, amid statewide budget cuts, the Allston branch was closed. ... On January 19, 2000 ground was broken for the Allston Branch Library. Designed by Machado and Silvetti Associates ... the branch officially opened for business on Saturday, June 16, 2001. On March 13, 2003 the branch was renamed the Honan-Allston branch in honor of City Councilor Brian Honan."
- Charlestown
  - Charlestown Branch, 179 Main Street, Charlestown. The Charlestown Branch Library originated with the addition of the town of Charlestown's public library when it was annexed in 1874. The library had opened at the start of 1862 in the Warren Institution for Savings Building with 6,000 volumes in its collection before moving to a space in the Charlestown City Hall in 1869. It remained at this location until it moved to the corner of Monument Square and Monument Avenue in 1913. It moved again in 1970 to its current location on Main Street.
- Dorchester
  - Adams Street Branch, 690 Adams Street, Dorchester. Library service in the Adams Street neighborhood began in 1875 with the implementation of a delivery station on Walnut street, followed by a reading room on Neponset Avenue in 1907. It moved to its current location in 1951. The 1951 building was replaced by a new, larger building in 2021.
  - Codman Square Branch, 690 Washington Street, Dorchester. "Opened in 1905 the branch was named for John Codman, a local preacher and patriot. It moved to 690 Washington Street in 1978, into a building designed by Eco-Texture, Inc."
  - Fields Corner Branch, 1520 Dorchester Avenue, Dorchester. The Fields Corner Branch was opened in 1969 to replace the first Dorchester Branch, which had been located nearby.
  - Grove Hall Branch, 41 Geneva Avenue, Dorchester. "The first library in this section of Roxbury opened May 1, 1898 in the rear of Mr. Mowry's Drug Store at the corner of Warren Street and Haynes Park with one table, eight chairs, two shelves and 200 books. ... In 1919 the building on the corner of Warren and Savin Streets officially became the Warren Street Branch Library. In 1926, this branch moved into its new quarters in the New Roxbury Memorial High School and thus became the Memorial Branch Library. The Memorial Branch was replaced in December 1970 by the Grove Hall Branch Library located at the corner of Warren and Crawford Streets. On April 4, 2009 the new branch library at 41 Geneva Avenue ... opened. Located in the newly-renovated Jeremiah E. Burke High School, the new library was designed by Schwartz/Silver Architects."
  - Lower Mills Branch, 27 Richmond Street, Dorchester. In 1875, a branch delivery post opened in the Lower Mills neighborhood of Dorchester supplied through the Central Library and the Dorchester Branch Library. It was promoted to branch status in 1876. The Branch moved in 1883 to the Blue Hills Bank building and built an addition in 1936. It moved to its current location on Richmond Street in 1981. The branch was scheduled to close in 2010, but as of 2021 is still in operation.
  - Uphams Corner Branch, 500 Columbia Road, Dorchester. Library service in Dorchester's Uphams Corner began with a temporary store-front location on Dudley Street before it moved in 1904 to an upper floor of a municipal building on Columbia Road. When the pool one floor below was closed, the library expanded into it and converted the former pool into a children's room.

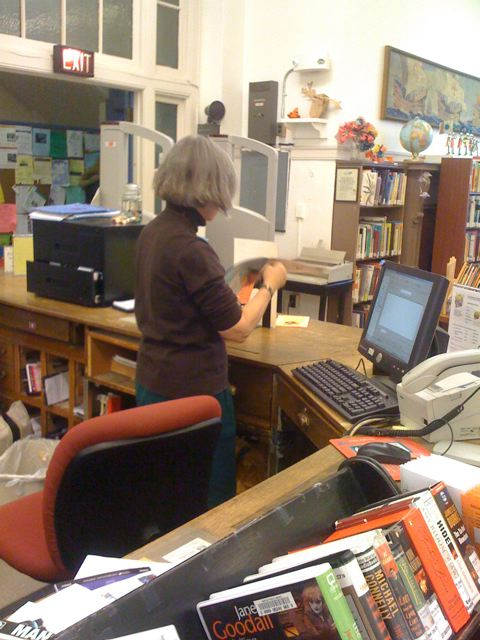
East Boston Branch, 2008

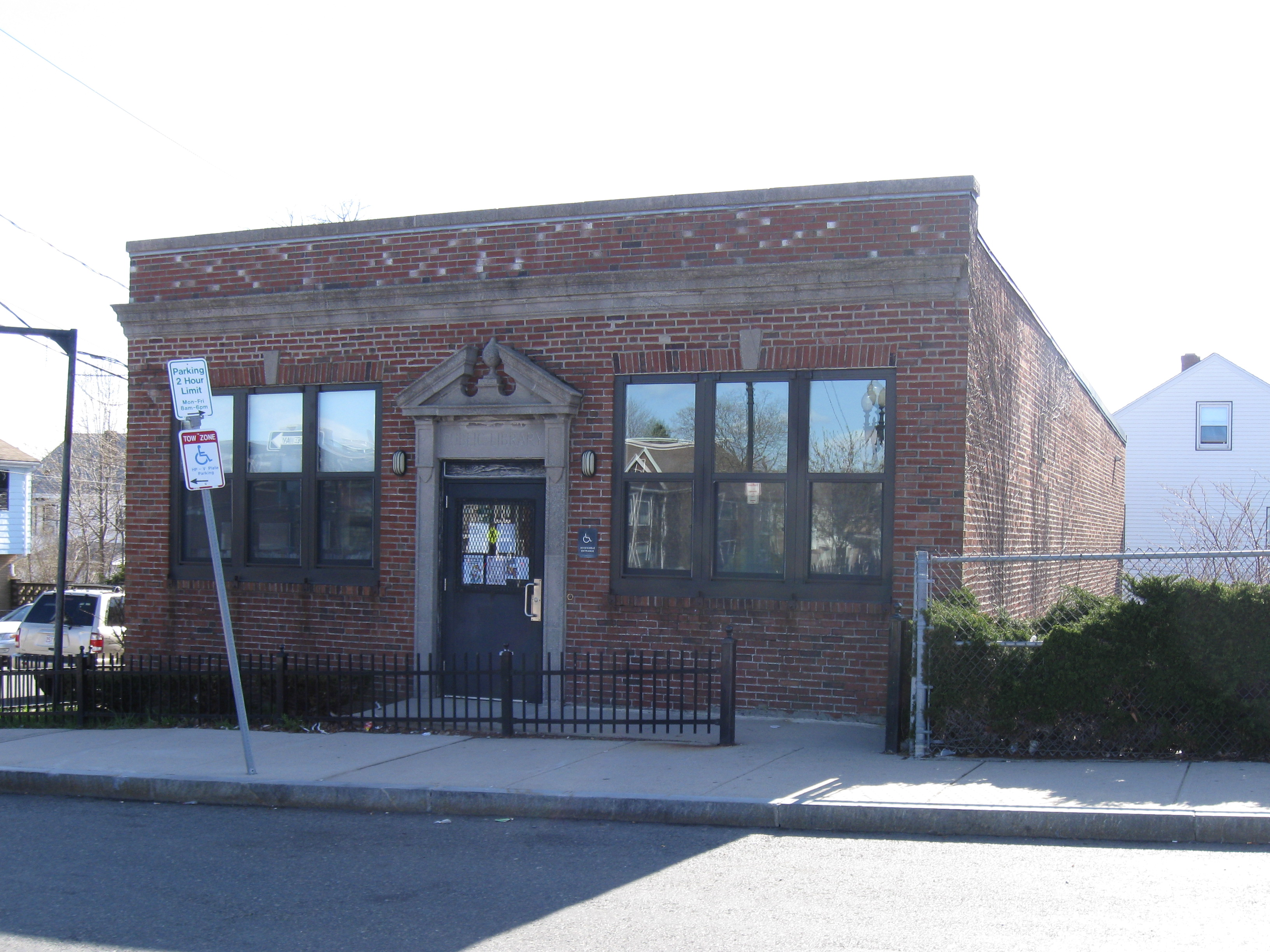
Orient Heights Branch, 2011. A branch in East Boston which closed in 2013.

- East Boston
  - East Boston Branch, 365 Bremen Street, East Boston. "Established in 1869, the East Boston Branch Library was the first municipally supported branch library in the United States. It opened in the old Lyman School with the collections of the East Boston Library Association and the Sumner Library." The current East Boston Branch, designed by William Rawn Associates, Architects, Inc., opened in November 2013.
- Hyde Park
  - Hyde Park Branch, 35 Harvard Avenue, Hyde Park. "The town of Hyde Park opened its first library in the Cobb's block of Everett Square in 1873. In 1884 it moved to larger quarters in the Masonic Block at the corner of Harvard Avenue and River Street. Ground was broken for the Town Library in December 1898 and the ... building was opened in September, 1899. The Library became a branch of the Boston Public Library when the town joined the City of Boston in 1912. ... In 1997 ground was broken for a new addition and a renovation of the existing building," completed in 2000. It is now the third-largest branch in Boston Public Library, after the Central Library and the West Roxbury branch, with area of 23,000 square feet (2,100 m^{2}).
- Jamaica Plain
  - Connolly Branch, 433 Centre Street, Jamaica Plain. "Library service to the Hyde Square area of Jamaica Plain began in 1897 with a small book deposit in the rear of a neighborhood pharmacy at the corner of Lamartine and Paul Gore Streets. Eventually, in 1905 the Boylston Branch, named for the Boylston Railroad Station, opened its doors. Responding to the need for larger space, a beautiful white limestone building was built and opened in 1932. Designed by Maginnis and Walsh in the Jacobean style, the large arched entrance leads to a large interior space with wood and glass partitions dividing the adult and children's area. The ceilings, decorated with plaster moldings, are reputedly inspired by the Rufford Abbey Library in England. On December 12, 1940, the name of the branch was officially changed to the Monsignor Arthur T. Connolly Branch, as a tribute to Monsignor Connolly, a long-time member of the Boston Public Library Board of Trustees and pastor of the neighboring Blessed Sacrament Church."
  - Jamaica Plain Branch, 12 Sedgwick Street, Jamaica Plain. "The Jamaica Plain Branch began in June, 1876, as a small Reading Room in Curtis Hall, with books supplied by the Roxbury Branch of the BPL. In September, 1877, it expanded and became the first BPL branch to purchase books from public funds. After a fire in 1908, the present building was constructed. The architecturally distinctive building features large schoolhouse windows and two fireplaces. It opened on July 24, 1911. An addition was built in 1936 and the interior was remodeled in 1963." In June 2015, it was closed for renovation. It reopened in May 2017.
- Mattapan
  - Mattapan Branch, 1350 Blue Hill Avenue, Mattapan. The Mattapan Branch started as a reading room and book delivery station in the Oakland Hall building before becoming an official Branch in 1923. It moved to 10 Hazelton Street in June 1931. It moved again in 2009, when the new Mattapan Branch building opened at its current location on Blue Hill Avenue. The new building was designed by William Rawn Associates Architects, Inc.

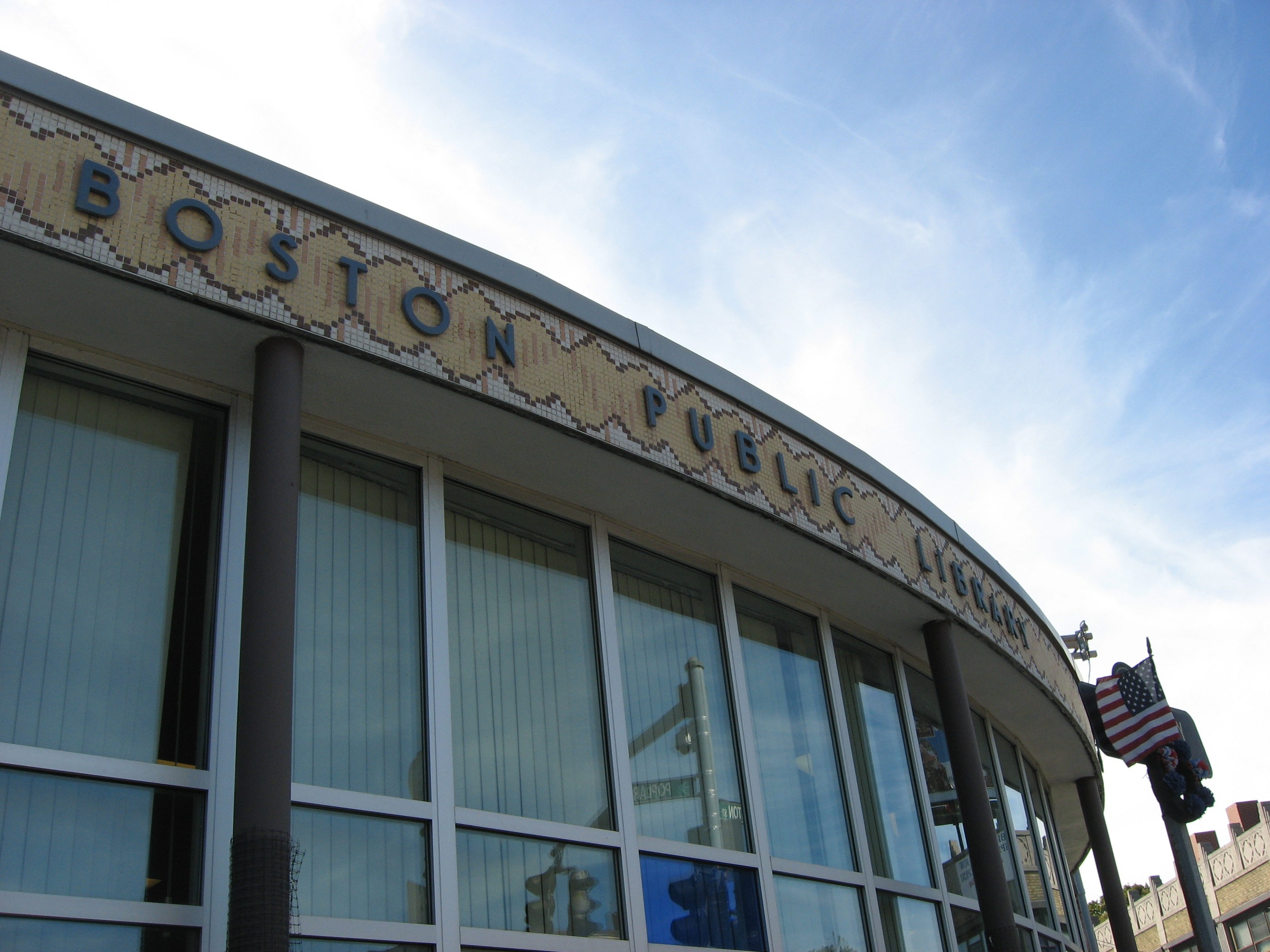
Roslindale Branch, 2008

- Roslindale
  - Roslindale Branch, 4238 Washington Street, Roslindale. "Library service has been provided to Roslindale since 1898. At that time, a book delivery station was located in a drugstore at the corner of Washington and Ashland Streets. ... In 1900 the library was moved to the Old Taft's Tavern building. In 1918, having outgrown its quarters, the library moved to the Municipal Building at the Corner of Washington Street and Cummins Highway. When the municipal facility became outmoded plans were made to move the library again. At the corner of Washington and Poplar Streets was a fire house which was torn down for the new library site. In 1961, a semi-circular building with huge glass windows, topped with a low blue dome, was designed by Isidor Richmond and Carny Goldberg."

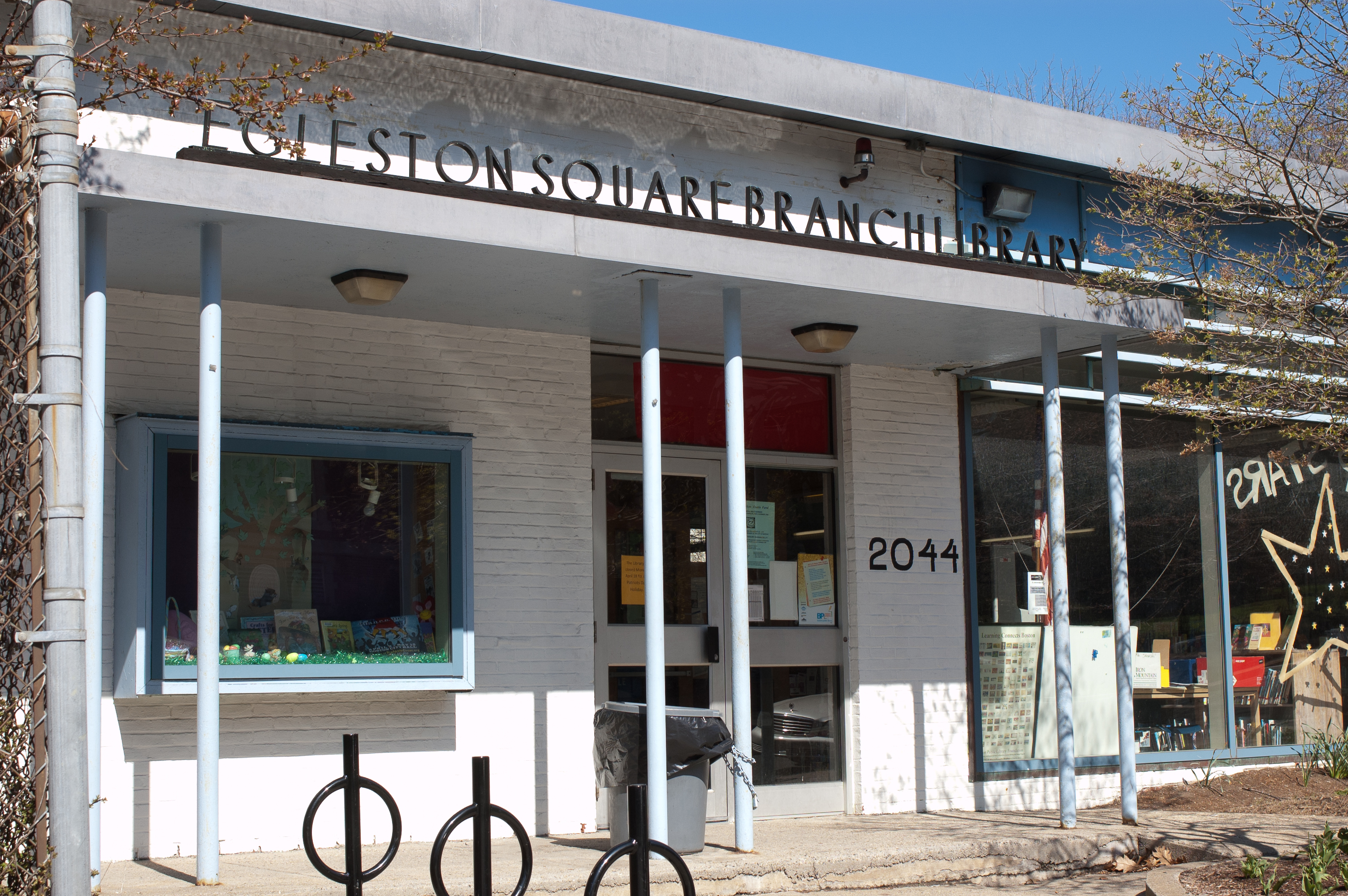
Egleston Square, 2011

- Roxbury
  - Shaw-Roxbury Branch, 65 Warren Street, Roxbury. Formerly known as the Roxbury Branch Library and the Dudley Branch Library. The Dudley Branch Library opened at its current location in April 1978. It replaced the Mount Pleasant Branch and the associated Fellowes Atheneaum. The Dudley Branch Library underwent renovation in 2019 and reopened in 2020 under the name Roxbury Branch of the Boston Public Library. The library was renamed again in 2025 in honor of Sarah-Ann Shaw, Boston's first Black woman TV reporter. The Shaw-Roxbury Branch is the largest in the Boston Public Library (BPL) system, excluding the central library location.
  - Egleston Square, 2044 Columbus Avenue, Roxbury. The Egleston Square Branch opened in its current location in July 1953. The building was designed by the firm of Isidor Richmond and Carney Goldberg. The Boston Mural Crew added a mural to the side in 2009.
  - Parker Hill Branch, 1497 Tremont Street, Roxbury. The first location opened just down the street at 1518 Tremont Street in 1907 before moving to the current Gothic-style building in 1931, which was designed by Ralph Adams Cram.
- South Boston
  - South Boston Branch, 646 East Broadway, South Boston. "The South Boston Branch first opened in April 1872 in the Masonic building at 372 West Broadway. It was the second branch library established in the United States. When the Masonic building was sold in 1948 the South Boston Branch was closed. ... The branch was reopened in June 1950 in a storefront at 385–8 West Broadway where it remained until destroyed by fire in May 1957. The present building ... consolidated the City Point Branch with the South Boston Branch."
- West Roxbury
  - West Roxbury Branch, 1961 Centre Street, West Roxbury. "In 1876 the Boston Public Library created a delivery station when it took over the collection of the West Roxbury Free Library. In 1896 it became a full branch of the Boston Public Library. In 1921–22, a new library building was built at the present site. In 1977 a devastating fire destroyed the neighboring West Roxbury Congregational Church and the land was deeded to the Trustees of the Boston Public Library for the purpose of an addition to the Branch building. On September 24, 1989 the new addition was opened to the public with community rooms, a gallery and a reading garden. The branch is home to the West Roxbury Historical Society." It is now the second-largest branch in Boston Public Library, after the Central Library, with area of 24,200 square feet (2,250 m^{2}).

== Gallery ==
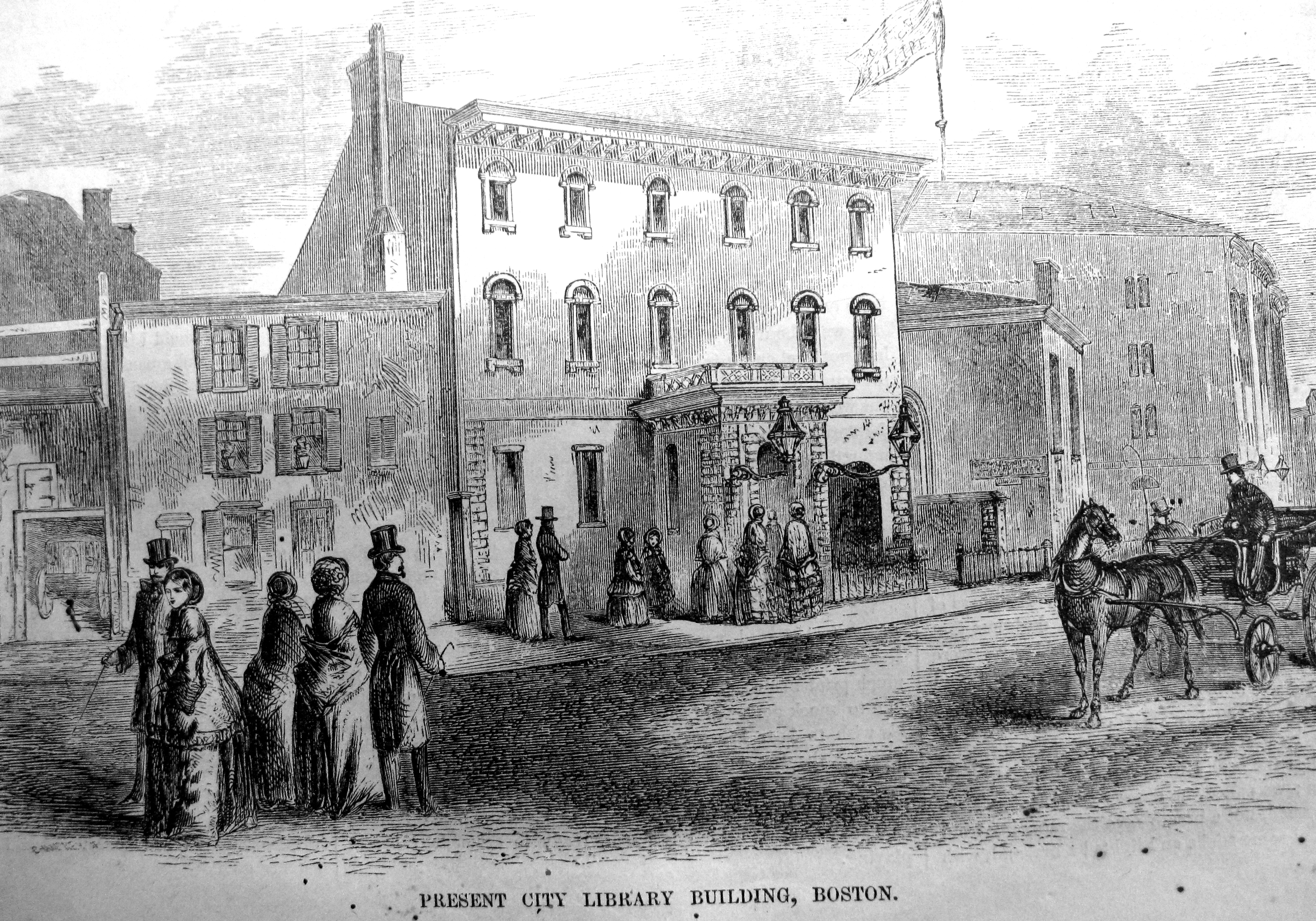
Temporary building, Mason Street, 1854-1858

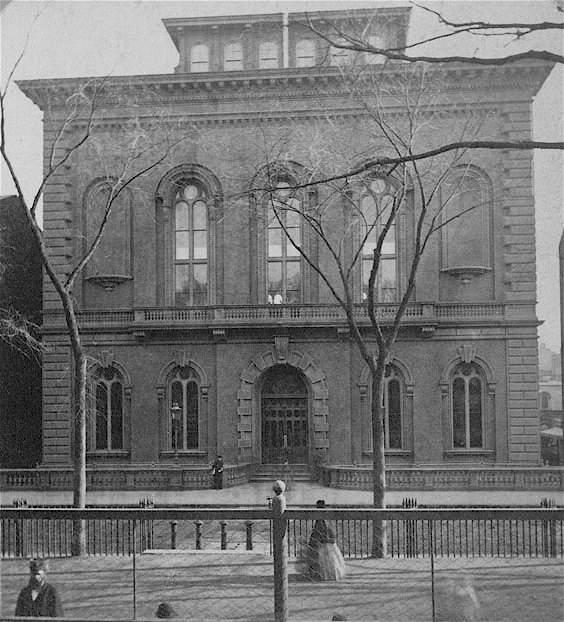
Exterior of Kirby Building, Boylston St., 1858–1895

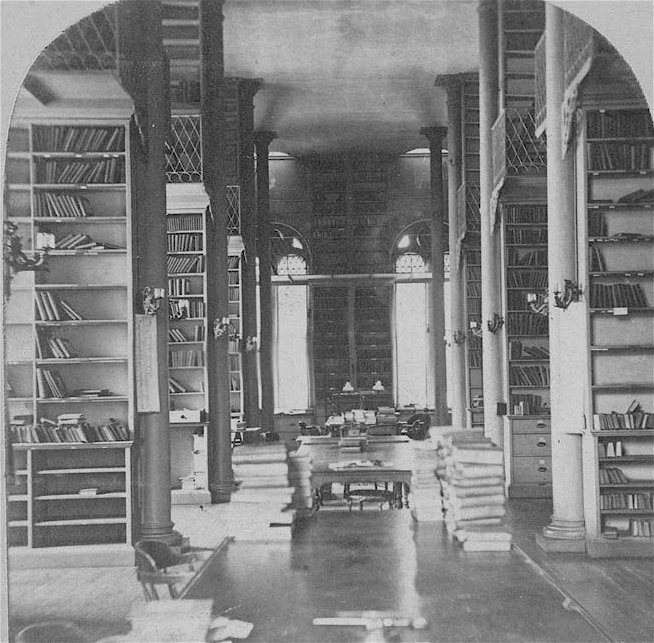
Lower hall stacks, Kirby Building, Boylston St., 1858–1895

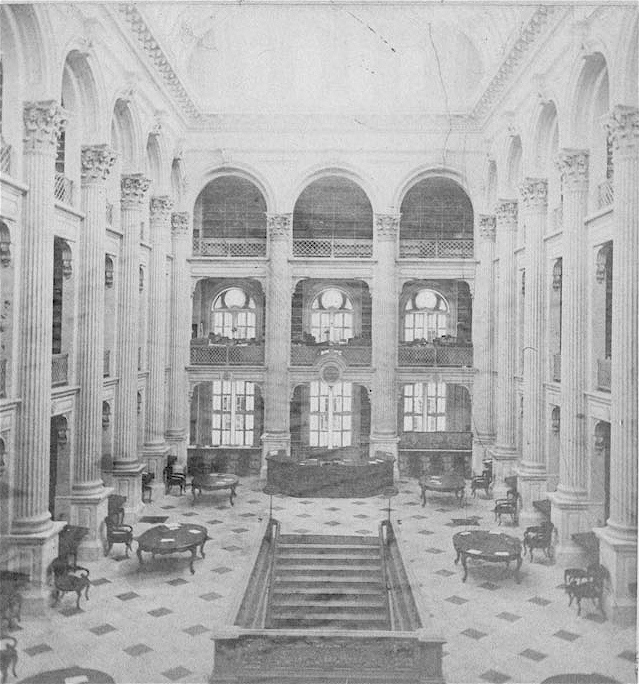
Upper (Bates) hall, Kirby Building, Boylston St., 1858–1895

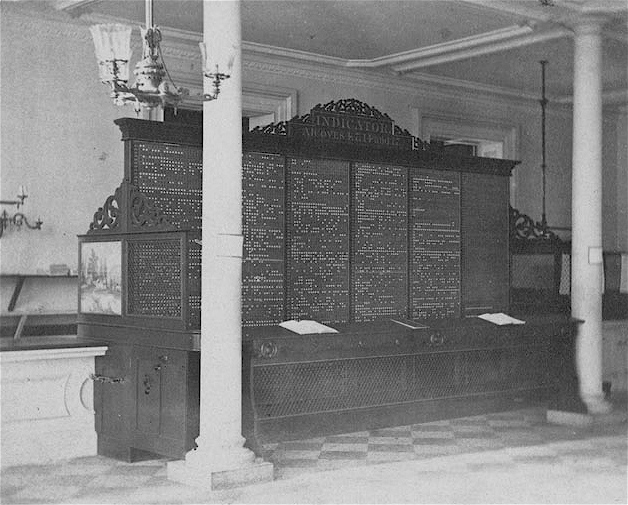
Lower hall indicator, Kirby Building, Boylston St., 1858–1895

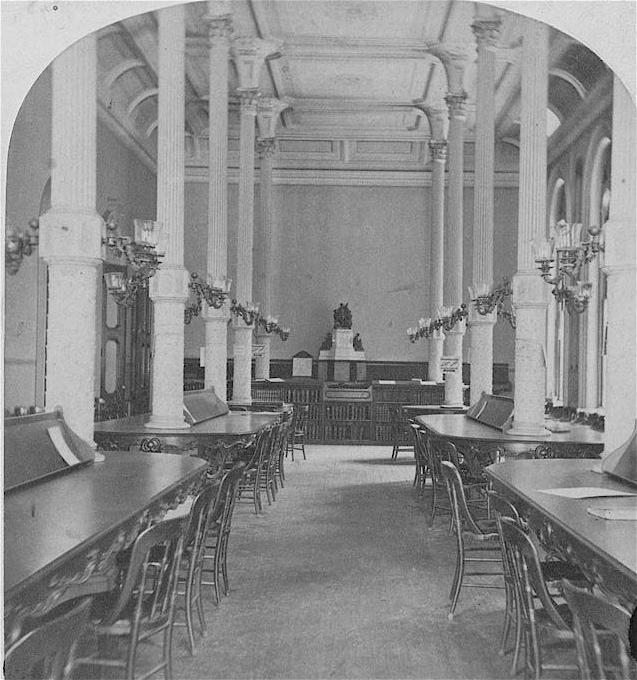
Lower hall reading room, Kirby Building, Boylston St., 1858–1895

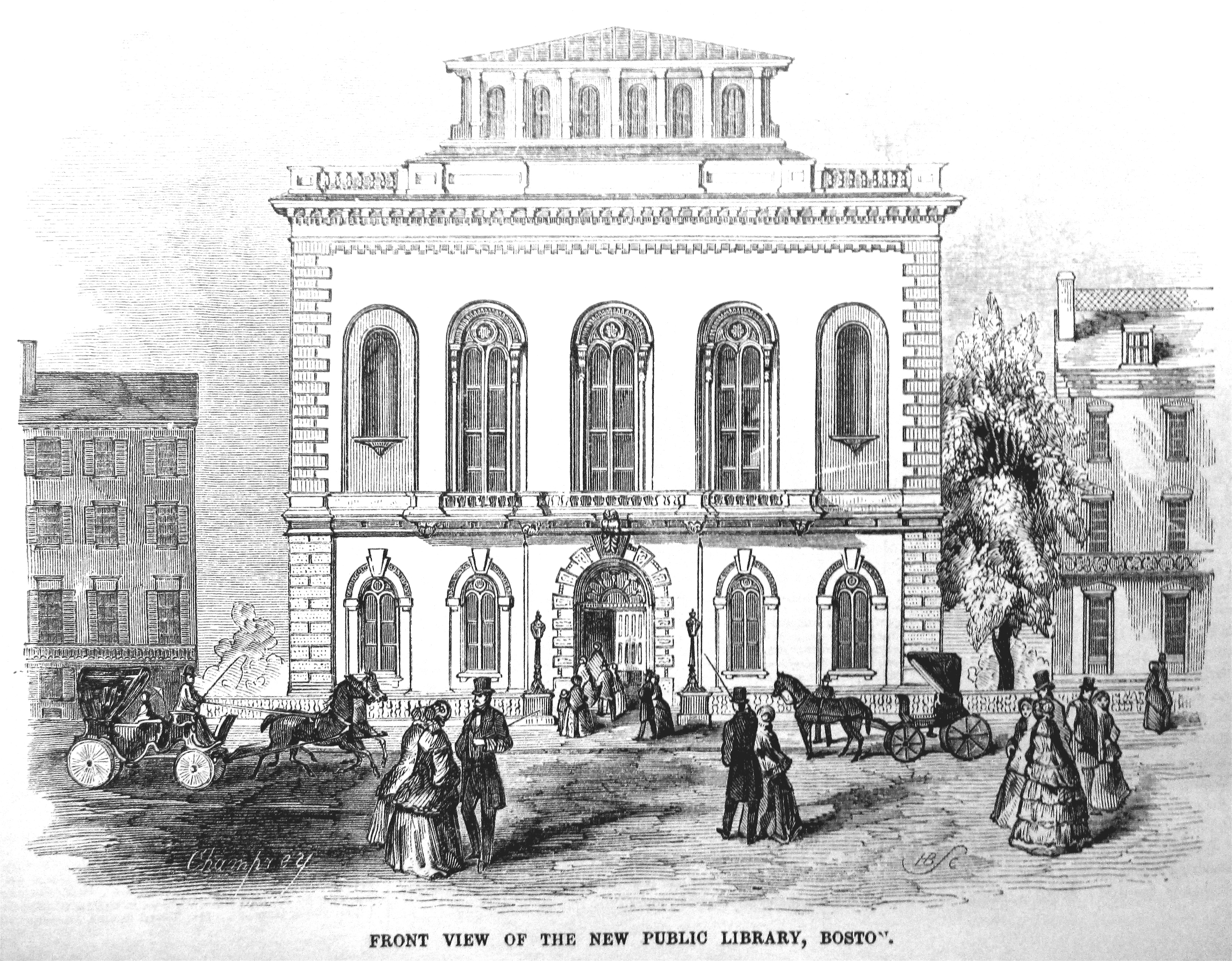
Engraving of exterior, Kirby Building, Boylston St., 1850s

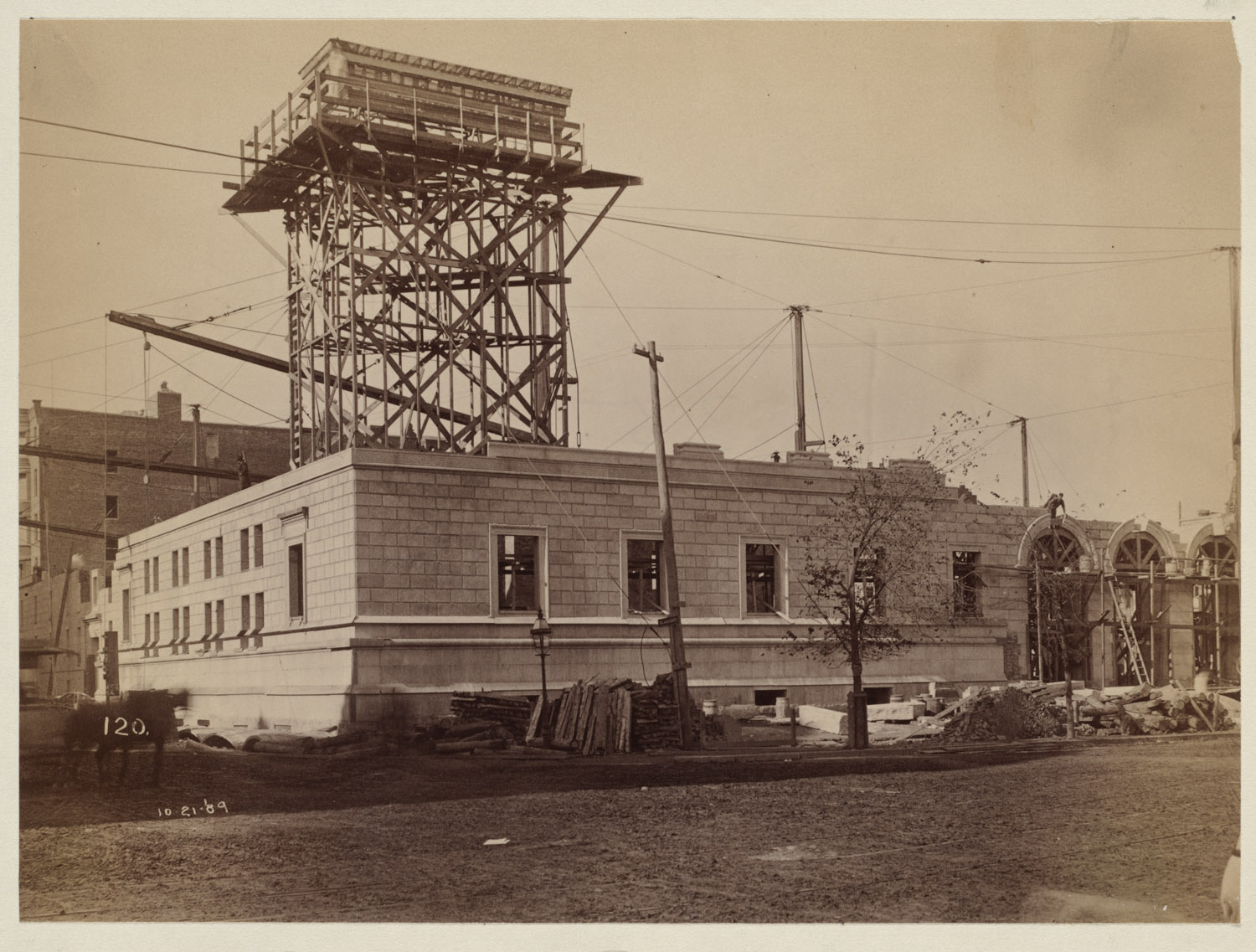
McKim Building construction 1889

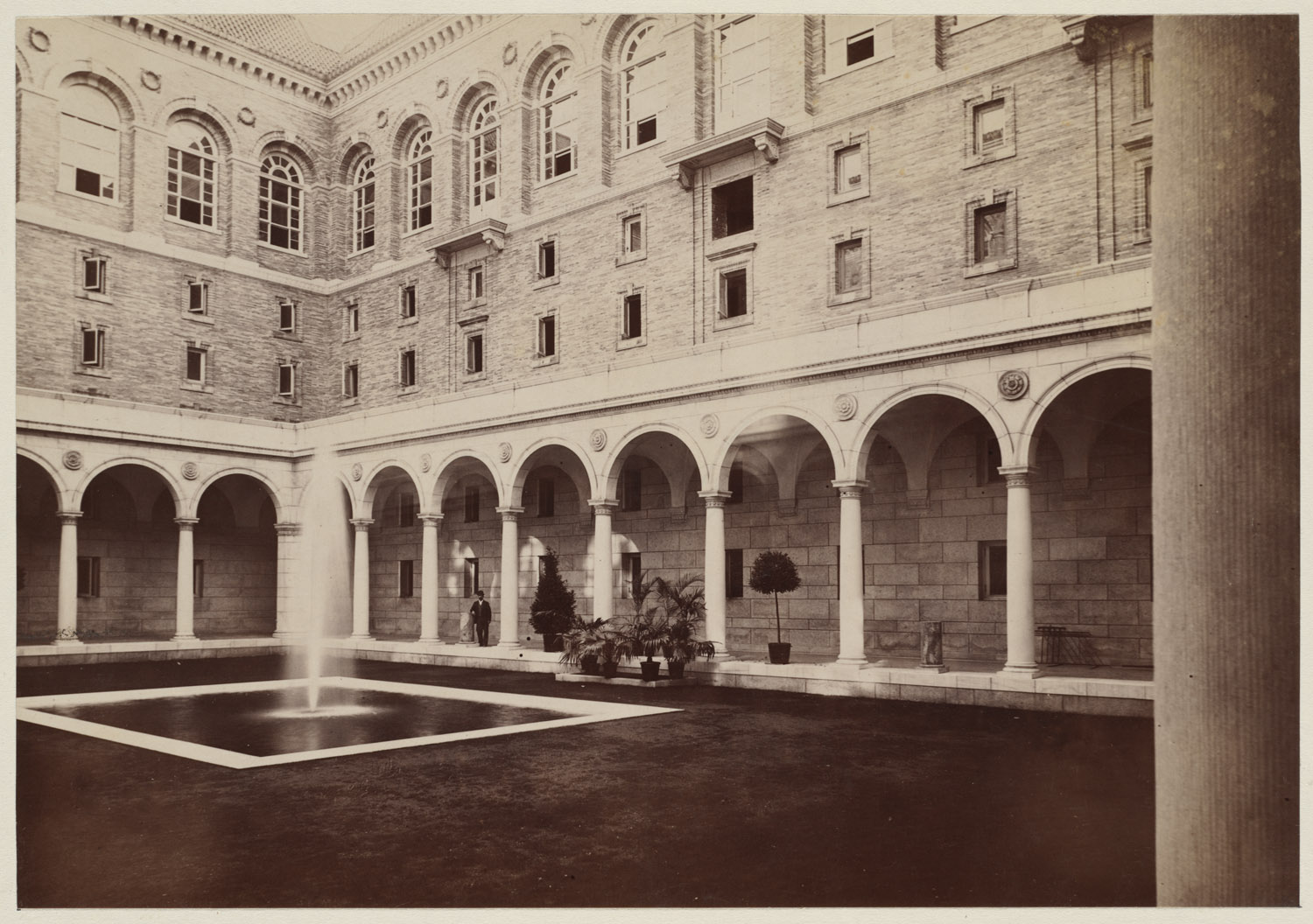
McKim Building courtyard, soon after opening, c. 1895.

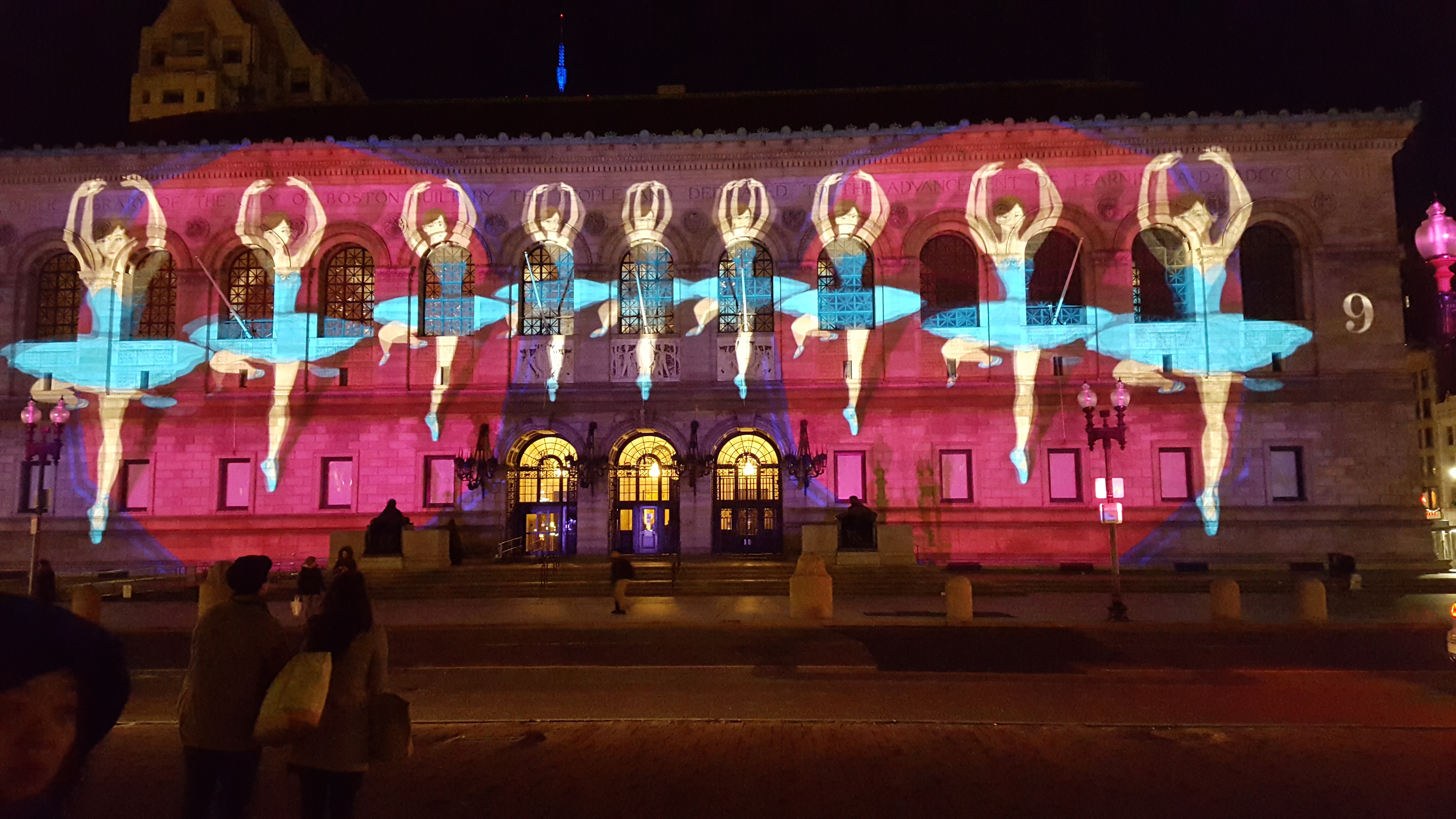
Dartmouth Street facade of McKim Building during the holiday season, December 2015

== See also ==
- Boston Public Library, McKim Building
- List of public libraries in Massachusetts
- Library system
