= Foundations and Trends in Electronic Design Automation =

- Discipline: Electronic Design Automation
- Language: English
- Edited by: Radu Marculescu

Publication details
- History: 2006-present
- Publisher: Now Publishers
- Frequency: Quarterly

Standard abbreviations
- ISO 4: Found. Trends Electron. Des. Autom.

Indexing
- ISSN: 1551-3939 (print); 1551-3947 (web)
- OCLC no.: 55964357

Links
- Journal homepage

Foundations and Trends in Electronic Design Automation is a journal published by Now Publishers. It publishes survey and tutorial articles on all aspects of electronic design automation. The editor-in-chief is Radu Marculescu (Carnegie Mellon University).

== Abstracting and indexing ==
The journal is abstracted and indexed in:

- Inspec
- EI-Compendex
- Scopus
- CSA databases
- ACM Digital Library

== See also ==
- Foundations and Trends
