= Foundations and Trends in Networking =

Engineering journal

- Discipline: Networking
- Language: English
- Edited by: Anthony Ephremides

Publication details
- History: 2004-present
- Publisher: Now Publishers
- Frequency: Quarterly

Standard abbreviations
- ISO 4: Found. Trends Netw.

Indexing
- ISSN: 1554-057X (print); 1554-0588 (web)
- OCLC no.: 57349705

Links
- Journal homepage

Foundations and Trends in Networking is a journal published by Now Publishers. It publishes survey and tutorial articles on all aspects of networking.

== Abstracting and indexing ==
The journal is abstracted and indexed in:

- Inspec
- EI-Compendex
- Scopus
- CSA databases
- ACM Digital Library

== See also ==
- Foundations and Trends
