= Foundations and Trends in Communications and Information Theory =

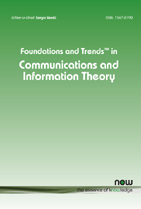
- Discipline: Information theory, wireless networks
- Language: English

Publication details
- History: 2004–present
- Publisher: Now Publishers
- Frequency: Quarterly

Standard abbreviations
- ISO 4: Found. Trends Commun. Inf. Theory

Indexing
- ISSN: 1567-2190 (print); 1567-2328 (web)
- OCLC no.: 637764199

Links
- Journal homepage

Foundations and Trends in Communications and Information Theory is a peer-reviewed academic journal that publishes long survey and tutorial articles in the field of communication and information theory. It was established in 2004 and is published by Now Publishers. The founding editor-in-chief was Sergio Verdú (Princeton University) and the current editor-in-chief is Alexander Barg (University of Maryland). Each issue comprises a single 100-250 page monograph.

== Abstracting and indexing ==
The journal is abstracted and indexed in:

- Inspec
- EI-Compendex
- Scopus
- CSA databases
- ACM Digital Library

== See also ==
- Foundations and Trends
