= Foundations and Trends in Computer Graphics and Vision =

- Discipline: Computer Graphics and Vision
- Language: English
- Edited by: Brian Curless, Luc Van Gool and Richard Szeliski

Publication details
- History: 2004-present
- Publisher: Now Publishers
- Frequency: Quarterly

Standard abbreviations
- ISO 4: Found. Trends Comput. Graph. Vis.

Indexing
- ISSN: 1572-2740 (print); 1572-2759 (web)
- OCLC no.: 55943053

Links
- Journal homepage

Foundations and Trends in Computer Graphics and Vision is a journal published by Now Publishers. It publishes survey and tutorial articles on all aspects of computer graphics and vision. The editor-in-chiefs are Brian Curless (University of Washington), Luc Van Gool (KU Leuven) and Richard Szeliski (Microsoft Research).

== Abstracting and indexing ==
The journal is abstracted and indexed in:

- Inspec
- EI-Compendex
- Scopus
- CSA databases
- ACM Digital Library

== See also ==
- Foundations and Trends
