= Foundations and Trends in Theoretical Computer Science =

- Discipline: Theoretical computer science
- Language: English
- Edited by: Salil Vadhan

Publication details
- History: 2005-present
- Publisher: Now Publishers
- Frequency: Quarterly

Standard abbreviations
- ISO 4: Found. Trends Theor. Comput. Sci.

Indexing
- ISSN: 1551-305X (print); 1551-3068 (web)
- OCLC no.: 55939292

Links
- Journal homepage

Foundations and Trends in Theoretical Computer Science is a peer-reviewed scientific journal that publishes long survey and tutorial articles in the field of theoretical computer science. It was established in 2005 and is published by Now Publishers. The founding editor is Madhu Sudan of Harvard University, a former principal researcher at Microsoft Research.

== Abstracting and indexing ==
The journal is abstracted and indexed in:

- Inspec
- EI-Compendex
- Scopus
- CSA databases
- ACM Digital Library

== See also ==
- Foundations and Trends
