= Foundations and Trends =

Academic journal series

Foundations and Trends (FnT) is a series of scientific journals published by Now Publishers focusing on review articles. Now was acquired by Emerald Group Publishing in 2025.

== List of Foundations and Trends journals ==
- Foundations and Trends in Communications and Information Theory
- Foundations and Trends in Theoretical Computer Science
- Foundations and Trends in Computer Graphics and Vision
- Foundations and Trends in Electronic Design Automation
- Foundations and Trends in Econometrics
- Foundations and Trends in Networking
