= Antonia Tulino =

Italian electrical engineer

Antonia Maria Tulino (born 1971) is an Italian electrical engineer whose research concerns information theory, multiple-input and multiple-output communication, and the applications of random matrix theory in wireless communication. She holds dual affiliations as a professor at the University of Naples Federico II and director of the 5G Academy of the University of Naples, and as a research professor in the New York University Tandon School of Engineering.

== Education and career ==
Tulino earned a PhD in 1999 from the Second University of Naples, now the Università degli Studi della Campania Luigi Vanvitelli. After postdoctoral research at Princeton University in the US, the University of Oulu in Finland, and the University of Sannio in Italy, she joined the University of Naples Federico II as an associate professor in 2002.

She has been a full professor at the University of Naples since 2017. From 2018 to 2019 she held the UC3M-Santander Chair of Excellence at Charles III University of Madrid. She added her research professorship at the New York University Tandon School of Engineering in 2019, and was named director of the 5G Academy of the University of Naples in 2020.

== Book ==
Tulino is a coauthor of the book Random Matrix Theory and Wireless Communications (with Sergio Verdú, Now Publishers, 2004).

== Recognition ==
Tulino received the 2009 Stephen O. Rice Prize from the IEEE Communications Society (jointly with Angel Lozano and Sergio Verdú), for the best paper in communication theory.

She was elected as an IEEE Fellow in 2013, "for contributions to the development and application of random matrix methods in information theory".
