= Sergio Verdú =

Spanish information theorist

Sergio Verdú (born Barcelona, Spain, August 15, 1958) is a former professor of electrical engineering and specialist in information theory. Until September 22, 2018, he was the Eugene Higgins Professor of Electrical Engineering at Princeton University, where he taught and conducted research on information theory in the Information Sciences and Systems Group. He was also affiliated with the program in Applied and Computational Mathematics. He was dismissed from the faculty following a university investigation of alleged sexual misconduct.

== Education and academic career ==
Verdu received the Telecommunications Engineering degree from the Polytechnic University of Catalonia, Barcelona, Spain, in 1980 and the PhD degree in Electrical Engineering from the University of Illinois at Urbana-Champaign in 1984. Conducted at the Coordinated Science Laboratory of the University of Illinois, his doctoral research was supervised by Vincent Poor and pioneered the field of multiuser detection. In 1998, his book Multiuser Detection was published by Cambridge University Press.

== Sexual harassment allegations and dismissal from tenured position ==
A Title IX investigation by Princeton, made public in November 2017 by the Huffington Post, concluded that Verdú had violated Princeton's sexual-misconduct policy. Yeohee Im, a graduate student at Princeton, had reported Verdu for sexual harassment in April 2017. According to the student, Verdú was initially required only to attend an 8-hour training session as a consequence of the university's finding, and he was allowed to continue teaching. The university said the training session had not been the only penalty, but declined to clarify what other penalties had been imposed. The student had changed advisers and changed her research topic after the alleged incidents.

According to the Princeton Dean of Faculty, there were allegations that Verdú had also harassed others, but only the one student was willing to make a formal complaint. Verdú denied the findings of the investigation, stating: "The university advised me not to reply but I categorically deny that there were any advances or any sexual harassment." Verdú was then placed on administrative leave at the beginning of the Spring 2018 semester and further sexual misconduct allegations against him were published in February 2018. He was subsequently dismissed from Princeton University as of September 22, 2018, following further consideration by the university, which said that "an investigation established that Dr. Verdu violated the university's policy prohibiting consensual relations with students, and its policy requiring honesty and cooperation in university matters".

Verdu filed a lawsuit against the university's action in a U.S. District Court. According to the materials of the United States Court of Appeals for the Third Circuit: "Verdu states three theories under which Princeton discriminated against him: erroneous outcome, selective enforcement, and retaliation." The District Court dismissed Verdu's complaint.

== Awards and honors ==
- IEEE Fellow (1993) for contribution to multi-user communication and information theory.
- Frederick Emmons Terman Award from the American Society for Engineering Education (2000)
- IEEE Third Millennium Medal (2000)
- Doctorate Honoris Causa from the Polytechnic University of Catalonia (2005)
- Member of the National Academy of Engineering (2007)
- Member of the National Academy of Sciences (2014)
- Corresponding Member of the Royal Academy of Engineering of Spain (2013)
- Claude E. Shannon Award from the IEEE Information Theory Society (2007)
- IEEE Richard W. Hamming Medal (2008)
- NAS Award for Scientific Reviewing (2016)

His papers have received several awards:

- 1992 IEEE Donald G. Fink Prize Paper Award
- 1998 Information Theory Paper Award from the IEEE Information Theory Society
- 1998 Golden Jubilee Paper Award from the IEEE Information Theory Society
- 2000 Paper Award from the Japan Telecommunications Advancement Foundation,
- 2002 Leonard G. Abraham Prize from the IEEE Communications Society (together with Ralf R. Müller), for best paper in the field of communications systems
- 2006 Communications Society & Information Theory Society Joint Paper Award from the IEEE Communications Society and the IEEE Information Theory Society
- 2008 EURASIP Journal on Wireless Communications and Networking Best Paper Award from the European Association for Signal Processing (EURASIP)
- 2009 Stephen O. Rice Prize from the IEEE Communications Society (together with Angel Lozano and Antonia Tulino), for best paper in the field of communications theory
- 2011 Information Theory Paper Award from the IEEE Information Theory Society

He served as president of the IEEE Information Theory Society in 1997. He was the founding editor-in-chief of the journal Foundations and Trends in Communications and Information Theory.
