= Research in Social Movements, Conflicts and Change =

- Discipline: Sociology
- Language: English
- Edited by: Patrick G. Coy

Publication details
- History: 1977–present
- Publisher: Emerald Group Publishing

Standard abbreviations
- ISO 4: Res. Soc. Mov. Confl. Change

Indexing
- ISSN: 0163-786X

Links
- Journal homepage

Research in Social Movements, Conflicts and Change is a peer-reviewed book series that covers sociological research on social conflict, social movements, collective behavior, and social change. The journal also publishes reviews of books on these topics. It was established in 1977 and is published by Emerald Group Publishing.

The journal's founding editor-in-chief was Louis Kriesberg (Syracuse University). Since 2010, the editor is Patrick G. Coy (Kent State University).
