= Foundations and Trends in Econometrics =

Academic journal

- Discipline: Econometrics
- Language: English
- Edited by: William H. Greene

Publication details
- History: 2005-present
- Publisher: Now Publishers
- Frequency: Quarterly

Standard abbreviations
- ISO 4: Found. Trends Econom.

Indexing
- ISSN: 1551-3084 (print); 1551-3076 (web)

Links
- Journal homepage

Foundations and Trends in Econometrics is a peer-reviewed scientific journal that publishes long survey and tutorial articles on econometrics. It was established in 2005 and is published by Now Publishers. The founding editor-in-chief is William H. Greene (New York University).

== Abstracting and indexing ==
The journal is indexed by the following services, among others:

- Cabell's International
- EconLit
- JEL
- Zentralblatt Math
- MathSciNet
- Google Scholar
- RePEc
- Scopus
- Ulrich's Periodicals Directory

== See also ==
- Foundations and Trends
