= William Greene (economist) =

American economist (born 1951)

William H. Greene
- Born: January 16, 1951 (age 75)

Academic background
- Education: University of Wisconsin–Madison; Ohio State University

Academic work
- Discipline: Econometrics
- Institutions: New York University
- Website: Information at IDEAS / RePEc

William H. Greene (born January 16, 1951) is an American economist. He was formerly the Robert Stansky Professor of Economics and Statistics at Stern School of Business at New York University. Greene is currently a professor of economics at the University of South Florida.

== Biography ==
In 1972, Greene graduated with a Bachelor of Science in business administration from Ohio State University. He also earned a master's degree (1974), and a Ph.D. (1976) in econometrics from the University of Wisconsin–Madison.

Before accepting his position in NYU, Greene worked as a consultant for the Civil Aeronautics Board in Washington, D.C.

Greene is the author of a popular graduate-level econometrics textbook: Econometric Analysis, which has run to 8th edition as of 2017. He is the founding editor-in-chief of Foundations and Trends in Econometrics journal.

== Selected publications ==
- Greene, William H. (1981). "On the Asymptotic Bias of the Ordinary Least Squares Estimator of the Tobit Model". Econometrica. 49 (2): 505–513. doi:10.2307/1913323. JSTOR 1913323.
- Greene, William H. (1980). "Maximum likelihood estimation of econometric frontier functions". Journal of Econometrics. 13 (1): 27–56. doi:10.1016/0304-4076(80)90041-X.
- Christensen, Laurits R.; Greene, William H. (1976). "Economies of Scale in U.S. Electric Power Generation". Journal of Political Economy. 84 (4): 655–676. doi:10.1086/260470. JSTOR 1831326. S2CID 154150052.

== See also ==
- LIMDEP
