= Multiuser detection =

Multiuser detection deals with demodulation of the mutually interfering digital streams of information that occur in areas such as wireless communications, high-speed data transmission, DSL, satellite communication, digital television, and magnetic recording. It is also being currently investigated for demodulation in low-power inter-chip and intra-chip communication. Multiuser detection encompasses both receiver technologies devoted to joint detection of all the interfering signals or to single-user receivers which are interested in recovering only one user but are robustified against multiuser interference and not just background noise.

Mutual interference is unavoidable in modern spectrally efficient wireless systems: even when using orthogonal multiplexing systems such as TDMA, synchronous CDMA or OFDMA, multiuser interference originates from channel distortion and from out-of-cell interference. In addition, in multi-antenna (MIMO) systems, the digitally modulated streams emanating from different antennas interfere at the receiver, and the MIMO receiver uses multiuser detection techniques to separate them. By exploiting the structure of the interfering signals, multiuser detection can increase spectral efficiency, receiver sensitivity, and the number of users the system can sustain.

Because of the mistaken belief in some quarters of the spread spectrum community that little could be gained from receivers more sophisticated than the single-user matched filter, multiuser detection did not start developing until the early 1980s. Verdu showed that the near-far problem suffered by CDMA was not inherent to this multiplexing technology and could be overcome by an optimum receiver that demodulates all users simultaneously. Verdu's receiver consisted of a bank of matched filters followed by a Viterbi algorithm. In the context of the capacity of the narrowband Gaussian two-user multiple-access channel, Cover showed the achievability of the capacity region by means of a successive cancellation receiver, which decodes one user treating the other as noise, re-encodes its signal and subtracts it from the received signal. The same near-far resistance of the optimum receiver can be achieved with the decorrelating receiver proposed in. Adaptive multiuser detectors that do not require prior knowledge of the interfering waveforms have also been proposed.

Large-system analyses of CDMA multiuser detection have also used methods from statistical mechanics. Toshiyuki Tanaka applied the replica method to randomly spread CDMA systems, deriving large-system performance expressions for individually optimum and jointly optimum multiuser detectors. Yoshiyuki Kabashima proposed a belief-propagation-based CDMA multiuser detection algorithm. Later work generalized randomly spread CDMA models by characterizing systems through the eigenvalue spectrum of the spreading-sequence cross-correlation matrix.
