= Cambridge Information Group =

Privately held holding company

- Type: Private
- Industry: Education; Information services; Technology
- Founded: 1971; 55 years ago
- Headquarters: Bethesda, Maryland, U.S.,
- Key people: Andy Snyder (CEO)
- Website: cig.com

Cambridge Information Group (CIG) is a privately held, family-owned global investment firm focusing on information services, education and technology.

The company is led by CEO Andy Snyder.

== History ==
CIG was founded in 1971 by Robert Snyder and a business partner. The companies initial holdings were Cambridge Scientific Abstracts (CSA), Disclosure Incorporated, and National Standards Association.

CIG purchased R. R. Bowker in 2001 and Sotheby's Institute of Art in 2003.

On February 9, 2007, CIG completed their acquisition of ProQuest. CIG sold ProQuest to Clarivate for $5.3 billion on December 1, 2021.

On June 10, 2022, CIG acquired Qatar-funded publisher Emerald Group Publishing, which they sold for $452 million in 2026.

As of 2024, CIG's portfolio of businesses included R. R. Bowker, Emerald Publishing, and CIG Education Group.

== See also ==
- ProQuest
- CSA (database company)
