= Mango Languages =

American online language-learning service

- Founded: 2007
- Founder: Jason Teshuba, Mike Teshuba, Ryan Whalen and Mike Goulas
- Headquarters: Farmington Hills, Michigan
- Website: www.mangolanguages.com

Mango Languages is an American online language-learning website and mobile app based in Farmington Hills, Michigan, for academic institutions, libraries, corporations, government agencies, and individuals. Mango Languages memberships range from $11.99 monthly for an individual user to $19.99 monthly for a family plan. Additionally, Mango Languages may also be accessed for free at select libraries through the Mango for Libraries program.

== History ==
Mango Languages was founded by Jason Teshuba (who also acts as CEO), Mike Teshuba, Ryan Whalen and Mike Goulas in 2007.

As of April 2019, Mango Languages offers 71 language courses. English lessons in 17 languages and specialty courses to teach cultural differences are also available.

Mango Languages employs organic language acquisition and emphasizes learning grammatical principles through realistic conversations. This is achieved through interactive lessons, spaced repetition, reinforcement exercises, color-coded translations, video content, and Google Translate integration. Another feature allows users to record their pronunciation and compare a visual image of its waveform to that of a native speaker's. Courses are accessible from a web browser or an app, and progress can be synced across devices.

In 2013, Mango Languages earned $7.9 million in revenue. In June 2019, Mango Languages launched a new brand identity and released “major advancements to its platform,” including “new personalized, adaptive, conversation-based lessons in over 70 languages for web, iOS, and Android.” Mango Languages offers licenses for its software to libraries, schools and other institutions.

== Languages ==
As of June 2026, Mango offered courses in the following languages:

Languages Offered for English Speakers
Language	Units	Chapters	Lessons
Arabic: Egyptian dialect	1	10	85
Arabic: Iraqi dialect	4	20	97
Arabic: Levantine dialect	5	41	594
Arabic: Modern Standard	4	20	99
Arabic - Arab Etiquette (MSA)	1	1	8
Arabic - Arab Superstitions (MSA)	1	1	6
Armenian	4	20	109
Azerbaijani	4	20	104
Aramaic: Sureth	1	10	104
Bengali	4	20	94
Cherokee	1	2	11
Chinese: Cantonese	1	10	56
Chinese: Mandarin	5	41	595
Mandarin - Business	1	5	87
Mandarin - Feng Shui	1	1	7
Mandarin - Zodiac Signs	1	1	11
Croatian	4	20	105
Czech	4	20	118
Danish	4	20	106
Dari Persian	1	2	13
Dutch	4	20	99
Dzongkha (Bhutanese)	1	2	13
Shakespearean English	1	1	9
Filipino: Tagalog	1	10	65
Finnish	4	20	95
French	5	41	585
French - Romance	1	1	7
French - Wine and Cheese	1	1	7
French - Argot	1	1	11
French: Canadian	4	20	95
German	5	41	757
German - Oktoberfest	1	1	16
Greek: Ancient	1	4	35
Greek: Koine (Biblical)	1	4	47
Greek: Modern	2	20	189
Haitian Creole	4	20	94
Hawaiian	4	20	118
Hebrew: Biblical	1	4	51
Hebrew: Modern	1	10	76
Hindi	1	10	55
Hungarian	4	20	104
Icelandic	4	20	93
Igbo	4	20	115
Indonesian	4	20	99
Irish	1	10	72
Irish - St. Patrick's Day	1	1	9
Italian	5	41	602
Italian - Romance	1	1	7
Italian - Carnival of Venice	1	1	7
Italian - Horse Race of Siena	1	1	8
Japanese	5	41	656
Japanese - English Loanwords	1	1	8
Japanese - Mimetic Words	1	1	11
Javanese	2	20	98
Kazakh	4	20	118
Korean	1	10	75
Korean - Academic Study	1	16	129
Latin	1	10	74
Malay	4	20	109
Malayalam	4	20	93
Norwegian	4	20	100
Pashto	1	2	12
Persian	2	20	200
Pirate	1	1	6
Polish	1	10	141
Portuguese: Brazilian	5	41	552
Portuguese - Romance	1	1	5
Portuguese - Soccer Celebration	1	3	15
Portuguese - Hospitality and Tourism	1	1	16
Potawatomi	1	10	133
Punjabi	4	20	114
Romanian	4	20	105
Russian	5	41	528
Russian - Slang	1	1	6
Russian - Superstitions	1	1	6
Scottish Gaelic	1	10	85
Serbian	4	20	105
Chinese: Shanghainese	1	2	14
Slovak	4	20	102
Spanish: Castilian	4	20	121
Spanish - Flamenco Dancing	1	1	7
Spanish - Soccer Celebration	1	1	7
Spanish: Latin American	5	41	700
Spanish - Business	1	5	45
Spanish - Romance	1	1	10
Spanish - Legal	1	1	15
Spanish - Librarian	1	5	41
Spanish - Medical	1	2	29
Spanish - Text Talk	1	1	7
Swahili	4	20	107
Swedish	4	20	93
Tamil	4	20	114
Telugu	4	20	115
Thai	1	10	66
Turkish	1	10	67
Tuvan	1	1	8
Ukrainian	4	20	107
Urdu	1	10	69
Uzbek	4	20	118
Vietnamese	1	10	70
Yiddish	4	20	96

As a novelty, Mango also offers a short course in "Pirate".

== See also ==
- List of language self-study programs
