= Biography and Genealogy Master Index =

Reference index and proprietary database

The Biography and Genealogy Master Index (BGMI) was a printed reference index, and is currently a proprietary database published by the Gale Research Company. The database indexes more than 15 million individuals, living and deceased, covered in more than 1700 biographical reference sources.

== History ==
The BGMI was initially published in print in 1975 under the editorship of M.C. Herbert and B. McNeil. The second print edition of eight volumes was published in 1980. The database version of BGMI indexes names exactly as they are spelled in the source indexes. Searches cover all volumes and supplements of the print publication, and returns an alphabetized list of all names retrieved.
