= Angel Lozano =

Electrical engineer

Angel Lozano is an electrical engineer at Universitat Pompeu Fabra in Barcelona, Spain. He was named a Fellow of the Institute of Electrical and Electronics Engineers (IEEE) in 2014 for his contributions to multiple-input, multiple-output antenna systems.
