= Cambridge Scientific Abstracts =

American database company

- Defunct: 2007
- Successor: ProQuest
- Country of origin: United States
- Headquarters location: Bethesda, Maryland
- Publication types: Databases
- Official website: www.csa.com

Cambridge Scientific Abstracts (later simply CSA) was a division of Cambridge Information Group and provider of online databases, based in Bethesda, Maryland, before merging with ProQuest of Ann Arbor, Michigan, in 2007. CSA hosted databases of abstracts and developed taxonomic indexing of scholarly articles. These databases were hosted on the CSA Illumina platform and were available alongside add-on products like CSA Illustrata (deep-indexing of tables and figures). The company produced numerous bibliographic databases in different fields of the arts and humanities, natural and social sciences, and technology. Thus, coverage included materials science, environmental sciences and pollution management, biological sciences, aquatic sciences and fisheries, biotechnology, engineering, computer science, sociology, linguistics, and other areas.

== Aluminium Industry Abstracts ==
Aluminium Industry Abstracts (AIA) was formerly known as World Aluminum Abstracts (WAA). Topical coverage in the technical literature includes aluminum, production processes, products, applications, and business applications. Coverage of the sources include periodicals, technical reports, conference proceedings, patents, trade journals, press releases, and books.

Subject coverage, in broad categories, of this database is the aluminum industry (including end uses of aluminum), aluminum intermetallics, business information, engineering testing and properties, extractive metallurgy, melting, casting, and foundry, metalworking, extraction, patents, metallurgy engineering, and quality control (including testing).

== Ceramic Abstracts ==
CSA publishes Ceramic Abstracts / World Ceramics Abstracts in conjunction with CERAM Research Ltd. This is database serves the ceramics industry. Coverage spans available global literature on the manufacture, processing, applications, properties and testing of traditional and advanced ceramics. In addition, this database is indexed for more than 3,000 published works of various formats such scientific and technical literature including monographs. Temporal coverage is generally from 1975 to the present day. The oldest record in the database has a publication date of 1971. This database is updated once per month, and approximately 15,000 new records are added each year. The size of the database is more than 454,000 records. The print equivalent for this database is World Ceramics Abstracts and Ceramic Abstracts.

== Civil Engineering Abstracts ==
CSA/ASCE Civil Engineering Abstracts encompasses global, indexing, and abstracting coverage of civil engineering technical literature. Coverage also includes the complementary fields of forensic engineering, engineering services management, engineering services marketing, engineering education, theoretical mechanics, theoretical dynamics, and computational studies. Serial and non-serial publications are part of this database. More than 3,000 abstracted titles encompass, books, conference proceedings, trade journal, scientific journals, technical journals, patents, government reports, dissertations, monographs newsletters, and press releases. Indexing with a controlled vocabulary (12,500 terms) also references items such as cited references, corresponding author's e-mail address, and publisher contact information. With a file size of 1,372,711 records (July 2010), an update frequency of once per month, about 40,000 records are added each year, and temporal coverage is from 1966 to present day.

== Computer and Information Systems Abstracts ==
Global coverage pertains to research and application, which is updated on a monthly basis. This database accesses periodicals, conference proceedings, technical reports, trade journals (including newsletter items), patents, books, and press releases. Non-serial publications are also covered. Research and application pertains to Artificial Intelligence, Computer Applications, Computer Programming, Computer Systems Organization, Computing Milieux Hardware, Information Systems, Mathematics of Computing, and Software Engineering.

== Earthquake Engineering Abstracts ==
The primary focus of Earthquake Engineering Abstracts (EEA) is coverage of earthquake engineering and earthquake hazard mitigation. This database contains 181,380 records which are full citations and abstracts, 52,000 journal articles, indexes and abstracts of major earthquake engineering research journals, along with 40,000 abstracts of proceedings (includes major meetings). 22,000 other records include abstracts of research monographs and technical reports. Coverage of sources is for more than 3,0000 periodicals, conference proceedings, technical reports, trade journal/newsletter items, patents, books, and press releases. Temporal coverage is from 1971 until present day.

== Electronics and Communications Abstracts ==
Electronics and Communications Abstracts indexes the fields of electronic engineering and communications; including theory, experiments, materials, equipment, and applications. Major subject areas are theory, circuits, components and materials, control and systems, power systems, telecommunications, Photonics, and subjects related to electronics or Electronic communications.

Temporal coverage is approximately from 1981 to the present, with the oldest record at 1961, 50% of the database indexes from 1994 to the present. Literature coverage spans periodicals, conference proceedings, technical reports, trade journal/newsletter items, patents, books, and press releases. It is updated monthly and 25,000 records are added annually. As of June 2013 this database contained more than 1,733,000 records.

== Engineered Materials Abstracts ==
Engineered Materials Abstracts, established in 1986, provides in-depth coverage of polymers, ceramics, and composites, including complex and advanced materials. The processes involving these materials such as research, manufacturing practices, properties and applications are also cited in this database. This electronic database also contains the sub-files named Ceramics, Composites and Polymers. In addition, this database is indexed for more than 3,000 relevant publications of various types, or groupings, which are related to scientific journal content. Dates of coverage span from approximately 1986 to present day. The oldest record in the database has a publication date of 1953. Furthermore, about 50% of its records have publication dates of 1993 or later. This database is updated once per month, and approximately 20,000 new records are added each year. As of June 2010 the size of the database is more than 796,357 records.

=== Advanced Polymers Abstracts ===
As a subfile of Engineered Materials Abstracts the focus of Advanced Polymers Abstracts is technical information about the uses, manufacturing, and properties of thermoset and thermoplastic resins. These materials are competing with metals to be the material for structures. The broad topical coverage includes molding, thermoplastic elastomers, extrusion, materials development, polymer blends, joining, bonding, synthesis, PVC, chain structure, performance testing, compounding, and filled plastics.

== Environmental Sciences & Pollution Management ==
This database provides abstracting and full bibliographic citation coverage of the available global literature which pertains to environmental sciences and pollution management. This database can link to full-text electronic journal articles. In addition, this database is indexed for more than 10,000 relevant publications of various types, or groupings, which are related to scientific journal content. Dates of coverage span from 1967 to present day. The update frequency is once a month, and approximately 6,000 new records are added each month. As of June 2010 the size of the database is more than 3,366,269 records. Temporal coverage is from 1967 to the present day.

General topical or subject coverage includes air, marine, and freshwater pollution; detection, monitoring, and analysis of pollution; effects of oil spills; point and non-point pollution; sewage and wastewater treatment; industrial and municipal disposal of sludge; hazardous wastes and refuse; toxicology of pesticides; heavy metals; agricultural chemicals; risk assessment, and environmental action; among other topics. Coverage of sources spans journal articles, conference proceedings, books and government publications.

"Environmental Sciences & Pollution Management" consists of twelve component or sub-file bibliographic databases that can be accessed independently. These are:

- Aquatic Pollution and Environmental Quality (ASFA 3)
- Bacteriology Abstracts (Microbiology B)
- Biotechnology Research Abstracts
- Ecology Abstracts
- Environmental Engineering Abstracts
- Health and Safety Science Abstracts
- Industrial and Applied Microbiology (Microbiology A)
- Pollution Abstracts
- Risk Abstracts
- Sustainability Science Abstracts
- Toxicology Abstracts
- Water Resources Abstracts

=== Environmental Engineering Abstracts ===
Environmental Engineering Abstracts provides abstracting and full bibliographic citation coverage of the available global literature which pertains to technological and engineering aspects of air and water quality, environmental safety, and energy production. General subject coverage spans relevant literature about mines and quarry equipment, nuclear power plants, thermoelectric energy, tidal and wind power, treatment of sewage and industrial wastes, water analysis and treatment techniques are included. 500 primary journals are indexed and abstracted. Relevant literature is added from more than 2,500 other sources such as monographs and conference proceedings. Temporal coverage is from 1990 to the present and the oldest record was published in 1973.

=== Environmental Periodicals Bibliography ===
Environmental Periodicals Bibliography (EPB), established in 1972, by the Environmental Studies Institute of the International Academy at Santa Barbara. This database contains more than 500,000 indexed citations, covering all environmental topics in scientific, technical, and popular journals. Comperehensive coverage of 500 journals is also included in this database. Citations are arranged by journal title and publisher, and when there are links to their respective cites, these are made available. CSA Illumina is a web access point, and this database is on CD-ROM as well.

== Health and Safety Science Abstracts ==
Authors are ProQuest – CSA Illumina and the University of Southern California. This database covers the relevant literature pertaining to public health, safety, and industrial hygiene. This also includes risks, hazards, and plausible solutions that affect individuals. Topical coverage includes aviation safety, aerospace safety, environmental safety, nuclear safety, medical safety, occupational safety, ergonomics, pollution, waste disposal, radiation, pesticides, epidemics, "and countless other phenomena having the potential to threaten the public, the environment, or the workplace itself...". The equivalent printed form is "Health and Safety Science Abstracts (1981–2003)".

== CSA High Technology Research Database with Aerospace ==
The CSA High Technology Research Database is a major abstracting and indexing database and category in the CSA Illumina database structure. It is considered to be the online equivalent of International Aerospace Abstracts (IAA) and Scientific and Technical Aerospace Reports (STAR from 1962 to 1993). These are also listed as the print counterparts.

It comprises four subtitles:

- Aerospace and High Technology Database
- Computer and Information Systems Abstracts
- Electronics and Communications Abstracts
- Solid State and Superconductivity Abstracts

The database covers theory, experimentation, application, emerging technologies, and companies that are involved in the space sciences (including aeronautics and astronautics), computer & information technology, solid state materials (including solid state devices), communications, chemistry geoscience, and finally electronics. Further research, application, and development coverage includes more than 40 countries including Japan and Eastern European nations.

More than 10.7 million records are available (February 2011), with a monthly update of approximately 100,000 records, and temporal coverage from 1962 to the present. It is indexed by references, abstracts, and 40,000 controlled vocabulary terms.

=== Aerospace & High Technology Database ===
The Aerospace and High Technology Database is a bibliographic database covering the space sciences as well as aeronautics and astronautics. This database also provides access to complementary disciplines, such as electronics, chemistry, physics, geoscience, and communications. The print equivalent is International Aerospace Abstracts (IAA) and Scientific and Technical Aerospace Reports (STAR from 1986 to 1993).

The Aerospace & High Technology Database began as two print publications, International Aerospace Abstracs (IAA) and Scientific and Technical Reports (STAR) Index. These were then incorporated into the Aerospace Database, produced by the American Institute of Aeronautics and Astronautics.

==== International Aerospace Abstracts ====
International Aerospace Abstracts was published by the Technical Information Service of the American Institute of Aeronautics and Astronautics, with an ISSN 0020-5842. Other previous authors was National Aeronautics and Space Administration (NASA) and the Institute of the Aerospace Sciences. It was published alternately with the Scientific and Technical Aerospace Reports in 1963. International Aerospace Abstracts was part of the International Aeronautical Abstracts section of the publication entitled Aerospace Engineering (ISSN 0096-669X).

==== Scientific and Technical Aerospace Reports ====
According to the NASA website: Effective May 2011, Scientific and Technical Aerospace Reports (STAR) is being retired, along with several other NASA scientific and technical information products.

Scientific and Technical Aerospace Reports (STAR) is an information resource listing citations and abstracts of NASA and worldwide aerospace-related scientific and technical information (STI). Updated biweekly, STAR highlights the most recent additions to the NASA Aeronautics and Space Database. Through this resource, the NASA STI Program provides timely access to the most current aerospace-related research and development (R&D) results.

STAR subject coverage includes all aspects of aeronautics and space research and development, supporting basic and applied research, and application, as well as aerospace aspects of Earth resources, energy development, conservation, oceanography, environmental protection, urban transportation and other topics of high national priority. The listing is arranged first by 11 broad subject divisions, then within these divisions by 76 subject categories and includes two indexes: subject and author.

=== Solid State and Superconductivity Abstracts ===
CSA Solid State and Superconductivity Abstracts (ISSN 0896-5900) provides online, international, coverage encompassing all aspects of theory, production, and application of solid state materials and devices. High and low temperature superconductivity technologies are included. Coverage is from approximately 1981 to the present day. The oldest record in the database has a publication date of 1970. About 50% of this database has records which were published since 1992. The database is updated once a month. Approximately 40,000 new records are added each year. As of June 2010, Solid State and Superconductivity Abstracts contains more than 967,000 records. There is a print equivalent of the same name.

== Mechanical Engineering Abstracts ==
Mechanical Engineering Abstracts is a continuation of the formerly named "ISMEC Bulletin" (v. 1, no. 1, July 10, 1973) (ISSN 0306-0039), which appears to have ceased under this title in December, 1987 (v. 20, no. 6). ISMEC Bulletin was published by Cambridge Scientific Abstracts. Now, Mechanical Engineering Abstracts is also known as "ISMEC, Mechanical Engineering Abstracts". Another title is "Information service in Mechanical Engineering Bulletin".

Temporal coverage for Mechanical Engineering Abstracts is from 1981 to 2002. Current information, beyond its temporal coverage, is not part of this database. Current information is located in Mechanical & Transportation Engineering Abstracts (see next section below). As of May 2010, this database contained more than 215,700 records.

Engineering Information is a co-publisher of this database. Global in scope, broad subject coverage comprises theory and application in mechanical engineering, engineering management, and Production engineering. Format coverage consists of scientific journals, articles, conference papers, methods, developments, and conclusions (including research results). The target audience is specialists, researchers, and engineers.

Further subject coverage includes all aspects of Mechanical engineering. Other subjects, which are covered in this database, are Aerospace engineering, Automotive engineering, Naval architecture and Marine engineering, Railroad engineering, and Materials handling. Nuclear technology is also part of this database covering: Fluid flow, Hydraulics, Pneumatics, and Vacuum Technology. Heat and Thermodynamics covers Industrial furnaces, process heating, space heating, air conditioning, refrigeration, and cryogenics.

- ISMEC, Mechanical Engineering Abstracts

(ISSN 0896-7113) (OCLC 17274450) (LCCN 88-647447)

== Mechanical & Transportation Engineering Abstracts ==
CSA Mechanical & Transportation Engineering Abstracts provides citations, abstracts, and indexing of the literature in mechanical and transportation engineering and other supporting engineering fields. This database is indexed for more than 3,000 relevant publications of various types which are related to scientific journal content. Dates of coverage are from 1966 to the present. The oldest record in the database has a publication date of 1895; about 50% of its records have publication dates of 1988 or later. The update frequency is once a month, and approximately 40,000 new records are added per year.

== METADEX ==
CSA METADEX is the database equivalent of Metals Abstracts, Metals Abstracts Index, and Alloys Index. It specializes in covering all topics pertaining to metals and alloys, which includes their properties, manufacturing, applications, and development. METADEX was established in 1966, and now contains more than 1,425,000 references. In addition, this database is indexed for more than 3,000 relevant publications of various types, or groupings, which are related to scientific journal content. Dates of coverage begin from, approximately, 1966 to the present day. The oldest record in the database has a publication date of 1939. However, about 50% of its records have publication dates of 1986 or later. METADEX is updated once a month. Approximately 45,000 new records are added per year. As of June 2010, this database contained more than 7,058,162 records.

=== CSA Materials Research Database with METADEX ===
Notable material science databases are combined under CSA Materials Research Database with METADEX. Contents up to the level of specialist are accessible, collected from the disciplines of materials science, metallurgy, ceramics, polymers, and composites used in engineering application. For all metals, alloys, polymers, ceramics, and composites in depth coverage of the industrial process is covered. This means, in depth coverage of raw materials, their processing and refining is included. The chain of processing continues with in depth coverage also of welding and fabrication developed for end uses. This is followed by performance, corrosion, and recycling, as related to all metals, alloys, polymers, ceramics, and composites. In addition, this database is indexed for more than 3,000 relevant publications of various types, or groupings, which are related to scientific journal content.

This database comprises the following:

- Aluminium Industry Abstracts
- Ceramic Abstracts/World Ceramics Abstracts
- Copper Technical Reference Library
- Corrosion Abstracts
- Engineered Materials Abstracts
- Materials Business File
- METADEX

== CSA Sociological Abstracts ==
Sociological Abstracts (SocioAbs) is a reliable and authoritative bibliographic resource that provide citations, abstracts, and indexing of the literature in sociology and related disciplines in the social and behavioral sciences. More specifically, abstracts of journal articles, books, book chapters, dissertations, conference papers, and citations for book reviews are indexed in a serially classified database of almost 2,000 publications. The database has been updated to include access to the complete backfiles of the print versions of Sociological Abstracts from its beginnings in 1952 through today. This database is updated monthly with approximately 30,000 records per year, and its total size exceeds 913,900 records.

Subjects covered are culture, social structure, demography, human biology, economic development environmental issues, family life conditions, social welfare, health, medicine, and law. Other subjects across the sociological spectrum are also included such as development, differentiation, arts, business, education, substance abuse, addiction, and women's studies.

== CSA Technology Research Database ==
CSA Technology Research Database is bibliographic platform that is updated monthly with temporal coverage from 1962 to the present. It combines a number of secondary databases: the Materials Research Database with METADEX (see above), the CSA High Technology Research Database with Aerospace (see above), and the CSA Engineering Research Database. Formats covered are periodicals, conference proceedings, technical reports, trade journal items, newsletter items, patents, books, and press releases. Subject coverage ranges across scientific and technology disciplines and includes the literature of materials science, aerospace, construction, mechanical engineering, electrical engineering, and information science. This database indexes more than 17.5 million records.

== See also ==
- List of academic databases and search engines
