= Emerald Group Publishing =

Journal publisher

- Parent company: Wiley
- Founded: 1967
- Founder: Keith Howard
- Country of origin: United Kingdom
- Headquarters location: Leeds, West Yorkshire, England
- Key people: Vicky Williams (CEO)
- Publication types: Academic journals, books, book series
- Nonfiction topics: Management, business, social sciences, library studies, education, health and social care, engineering, and more
- Revenue: ▲£39.3 m (2015)
- No. of employees: 350 (2025)
- Official website: emeraldgrouppublishing.com

Emerald Publishing Limited is a scholarly publisher of academic journals and books, headquartered in Leeds, England. Originally focused in the areas of social sciences and management, including management, business, education, and library studies, Emerald also publishes in the areas of health, science, engineering, and technology.

Emerald Publishing began as an independent publishing house, formed by Keith Howard (OBE) and a group of management academics from the University of Bradford. Howard stepped down as Chairman of the Emerald Group in 2017. Vicky Williams became the CEO of Emerald Publishing in 2018, replacing Richard Bevan, who took over Howard's role of Executive Chairman. Emerald Group Publishing was acquired by US-based Cambridge Information Group in 2022. Cambridge sold Emerald Publishing to Wiley in 2026.

== History ==
Emerald was founded in the United Kingdom in 1967 as Management Consultants Bradford (MCB) UP Ltd. The publisher changed its name to Emerald in 2002 following the success of its Emerald Fulltext database.

In 2007, Emerald acquired a programme of Management and Social Science book serials, series and monographs from Elsevier.

In 2011, Emerald acquired health and social care publisher Pier Professional Limited, and in 2015, they acquired GoodPractice, a provider of support tools for leaders and senior managers. In 2020, Good Practice, Towards Maturity and Mind Tools were combined under Emerald.

On 10 June 2022, Cambridge Information Group acquired Emerald Group Publishing.

As of 23 May 2023, Emerald Publishing Limited acquired the book catalogue of Thomas Telford Limited (TTL) including 35 journal titles and other related publishing assets, from the Institution of Civil Engineers (ICE). The New Engineering Contract (NEC) Guides were not included in the sale. In November 2024, Emerald acquired Information Age Publishing. In May 2025, Emerald acquired Now Publishers.

In 2026, Wiley purchased Emerald Publishing from Cambridge Information Group for $452 million.

== Sustainability and inclusivity ==
Emerald Publishing advocates for sustainability and inclusivity in research and publishing. In 2020, Emerald Publishing became a signatory to the SDG Publishers Compact, in support of the United Nations Sustainable Development Goals. Two of Emerald's journals, Smart and Sustainable Built Environment and Gender in Management, received the highest possible "Five Wheel" impact rating from the SDG Impact Intensity journal rating system, based on an analysis of data from 2016–2020 that assessed relevance to the Sustainable Development Goals (SDGs). Emerald commissioned two global inclusivity reports (2020 and 2022) to assess diversity and inclusion in the academic sector.

== Sponsorships ==
In 2017, Emerald became the title sponsor of Headingley Stadium, which was renamed Emerald Headingley. As part of the deal the new main stand was named The Emerald Stand. Emerald withdrew its sponsorship in November 2021, following an alleged racism scandal involving the Yorkshire County Cricket Club.

== See also ==
- Category:Emerald Group Publishing academic journals
