= List of twin towns and sister cities in Hungary =

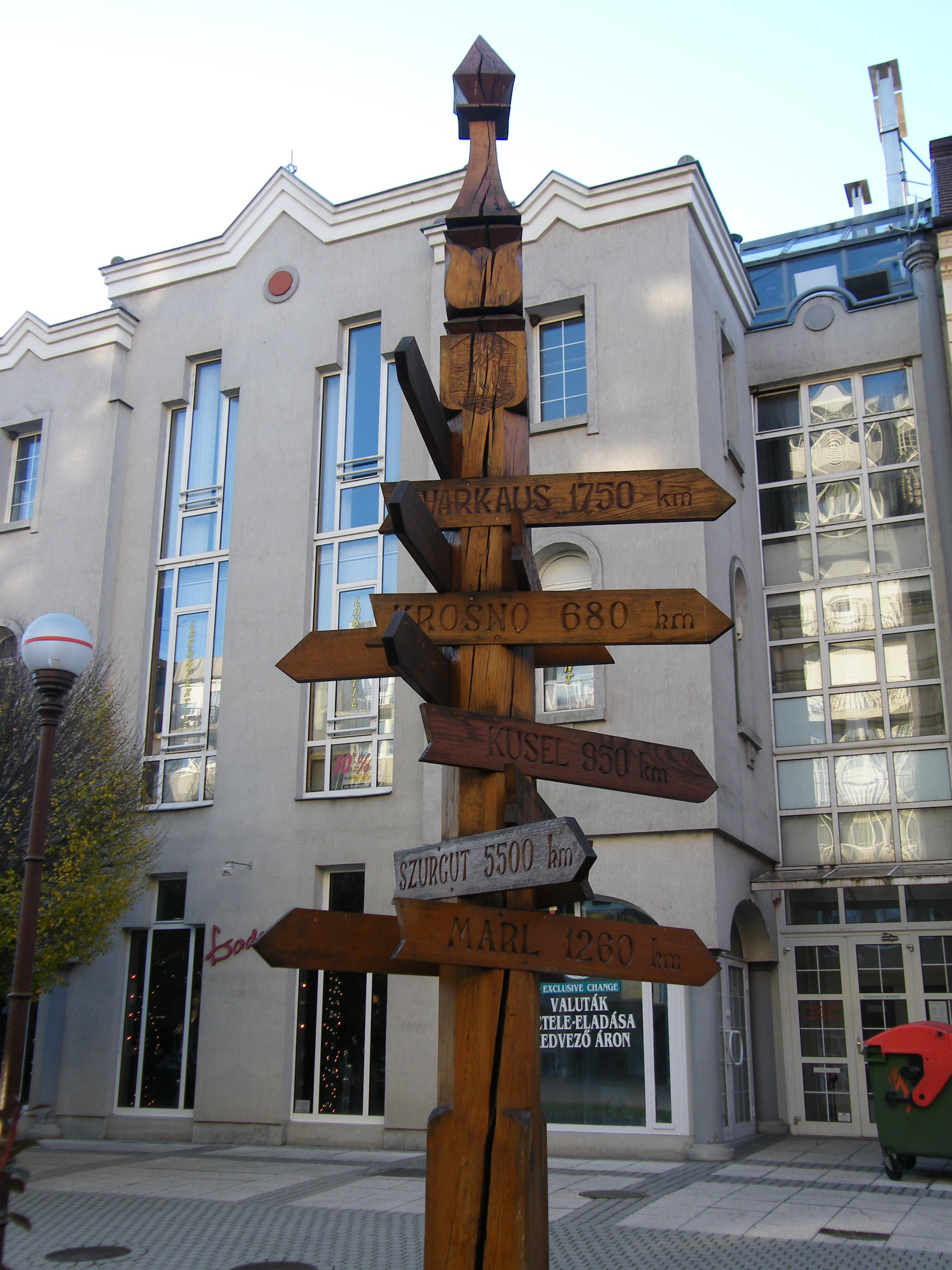
A sign showing twin towns of Zalaegerszeg

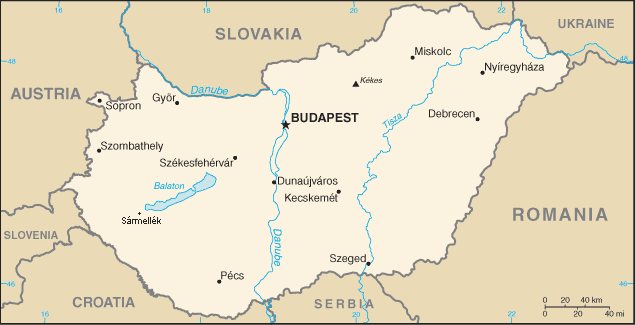
Map of Hungary

This is a list of municipalities in Hungary which have standing links to local communities in other countries known as "town twinning" (usually in Europe) or "sister cities" (usually in the rest of the world).

== A ==
Ábrahámhegy

- Dobruška, Czech Republic

Ajka

- Cristuru Secuiesc, Romania
- Donghai County, China
- Rovaniemi, Finland
- Unna, Germany
- Weiz, Austria

Adony

- Oberweser, Germany
- Szczekociny, Poland
- Cehu Silvaniei, Romania

Albertirsa

- Bourg-Saint-Andéol, France
- Gaggiano, Italy
- Malacky, Slovakia
- Șimleu Silvaniei, Romania
- Żnin, Poland

Algyő

- Hebertsfelden, Germany
- Martonoš (Kanjiža), Serbia
- Uivar, Romania

Alsózsolca

- Matei, Romania
- Plešivec, Slovakia

Aszód

- Miercurea Nirajului, Romania
- Obernburg, Germany
- Tăuții-Măgherăuș, Romania

== B ==
=== Ba ===
Bábolna

- Mariagerfjord, Denmark
- Mostová, Slovakia
- Sieghartskirchen, Austria
- Ypäjä, Finland

Bácsalmás

- Backnang, Germany
- Bajmok (Subotica), Serbia
- Bezdan (Sombor), Serbia
- Bizovac, Croatia
- Borsec, Romania
- Gizałki, Poland
- Veľký Meder, Slovakia

Baja

- Argentan, France
- Hódmezővásárhely, Hungary
- Labin, Croatia
- Sângeorgiu de Pădure, Romania
- Sombor, Serbia
- Târgu Mureş, Romania
- Thisted, Denmark
- Waiblingen, Germany

Baktalórántháza

- Ciumani, Romania
- Dány, Hungary
- Łańcut, Poland
- Nenince, Slovakia
- Ráckeve, Hungary
- Tiachiv, Ukraine

Balassagyarmat

- Dej, Romania
- Heimenkirch, Germany
- Lamezia Terme, Italy
- Ostrołęka, Poland
- Slovenské Ďarmoty, Slovakia

Balatonalmádi

- Băile Tușnad, Romania
- Eggenfelden, Germany
- Nitrianske Hrnčiarovce, Slovakia
- Serock, Poland

Balatonboglár

- Bönnigheim, Germany
- Gródek nad Dunajcem, Poland
- Kalinovac, Croatia
- Loosdorf, Austria
- Ormelle, Italy
- Vlăhița, Romania

Balatonföldvár

- Gaienhofen, Germany
- Kühbach, Germany
- Saint-Georges-de-Didonne, France
- Steckborn, Switzerland
- Ylöjärvi, Finland
- Zetea, Romania

Balatonfüred

- Arpino, Italy
- Covasna, Romania
- Germering, Germany
- Kouvola, Finland
- Opatija, Croatia

Balatonlelle

- Garešnica, Croatia
- Ramstein-Miesenbach, Germany
- Vlăhița, Romania

Balatonszentgyörgy

- Sfântu Gheorghe, Romania

Balmazújváros

- Gulbene, Latvia
- Łańcut, Poland
- Tiachiv, Ukraine
- Valea lui Mihai, Romania

Baracs

- Montois-la-Montagne, France
- Vlăhița, Romania

Barcs

- Knittelfeld, Austria
- Odorheiu Secuiesc, Romania
- Sinsheim, Germany
- Virovitica, Croatia
- Želiezovce, Slovakia

Bátaszék

- Besigheim, Germany
- Ditrău, Romania
- Tekovské Lužany, Slovakia

Bátonyterenye

- Fiľakovo, Slovakia
- Giresun, Turkey
- Jirkov, Czech Republic
- Kobylnica, Poland

Battonya

- Beočin, Serbia
- Lipova, Romania
- Pecica, Romania

=== Be–Bo ===
Békés

- Gheorgheni, Romania
- Myszków, Poland
- Novi Itebej (Žitiště), Serbia

Békéscsaba

- Beiuş, Romania
- Krompachy, Slovakia
- Martin, Slovakia
- Mikkeli, Finland
- Odorheiu Secuiesc, Romania
- Tarnowskie Góry, Poland
- Trenčín, Slovakia
- Uzhhorod, Ukraine
- Wittenberg, Germany
- Zrenjanin, Serbia

Bercel

- Căpâlnița, Romania
- Modrý Kameň, Slovakia

Berettyóújfalu

- Marghita, Romania
- Montegrotto Terme, Italy
- Porcia, Italy
- Vyshny Volochyok, Russia

Biatorbágy

- Dolný Štál, Slovakia
- Herbrechtingen, Germany
- Kiti, Cyprus
- Remetea, Romania
- Velyka Dobron, Ukraine

Bicske

- Altshausen, Germany
- Băile Tușnad, Romania
- Chop, Ukraine
- Reci, Romania

Bonyhád

- Borsec, Romania
- Jastrowie, Poland
- Pančevo, Serbia
- Siculeni, Romania
- Treuchtlingen, Germany
- Tvrdošovce, Slovakia
- Wernau, Germany

Borsodnádasd

- Smižany, Slovakia

=== Bu ===
Budakalász

- Ada, Serbia
- Kahl am Main, Germany
- Lueta, Romania

Budakeszi

- Balog nad Ipľom, Slovakia
- Biecz, Poland
- Delbrück, Germany
- Dyida, Ukraine
- Lich, Germany
- Miercurea Ciuc, Romania
- Neckarsulm, Germany
- Sankt Margarethen an der Raab, Austria

Budaörs

- Bretzfeld, Germany
- Kanjiža, Serbia
- Nová Vieska, Slovakia
- Pula, Croatia
- Pyrgos, Greece

Budapest

- Ankara, Turkey
- Beijing, China
- Berehove, Ukraine
- Berlin, Germany
- Bethlehem, Palestine
- Florence, Italy
- Fort Worth, United States
- Frankfurt am Main, Germany
- Košice, Slovakia
- Kraków, Poland
- Lendava, Slovenia
- Lisbon, Portugal
- New York City, United States
- Odorheiu Secuiesc, Romania
- Sarajevo, Bosnia and Herzegovina
- Shanghai, China
- Tehran, Iran
- Tel Aviv, Israel
- Zagreb, Croatia

Budapest I – Budavár

- Capestrano, Italy
- Carouge, Switzerland
- Innere Stadt (Vienna), Austria
- Lendava, Slovenia
- Marlow, England, United Kingdom
- Mukachevo, Ukraine
- Odorheiu Secuiesc, Romania
- Old Town (Bratislava), Slovakia
- Prague 1 (Prague), Czech Republic
- Regensburg, Germany
- Savonlinna, Finland
- Senta, Serbia
- Śródmieście (Warsaw), Poland

Budapest II

- Beşiktaş, Turkey
- Finike, Turkey
- Mosbach, Germany
- Żoliborz (Warsaw), Poland

Budapest III – Óbuda-Békásmegyer

- Bemowo (Warsaw), Poland
- Billigheim, Germany
- Büyükçekmece, Turkey
- Miercurea Ciuc, Romania
- Old Town (Košice), Slovakia
- Stirling, Scotland, United Kingdom
- Uzhhorod, Ukraine

Budapest V – Belváros-Lipótváros

- Bačka Topola, Serbia
- Charlottenburg-Wilmersdorf (Berlin), Germany
- Gheorgheni, Romania
- Inlăceni (Atid), Romania
- Mondragone, Italy
- Old Town (Kraków), Poland
- Rakhiv, Ukraine
- Rimetea, Romania
- Rožňava, Slovakia

Budapest VI – Terézváros

- Târgu Secuiesc, Romania
- Temerin, Serbia
- Zadar, Croatia

Budapest VII – Erzsébetváros

- Karlovac, Croatia
- Nevers, France
- Požega, Croatia
- Safed, Israel
- Stari Grad (Belgrade), Serbia
- Stavroupoli, Greece
- Sveti Vlas (Nesebar), Bulgaria

Budapest VIII – Józsefváros

- Pescina, Italy

Budapest IX – Ferencváros

- Berehove, Ukraine
- Kanjiža, Serbia
- Kráľovský Chlmec, Slovakia
- Sfântu Gheorghe, Romania

Budapest X – Kőbánya

- Bălan, Romania
- Jarosław, Poland
- Letovice, Czech Republic
- Litochoro, Greece
- Štúrovo, Slovakia
- Vinkovci, Croatia
- Wolverhampton, England, United Kingdom

Budapest XI – Újbuda

- Ada, Serbia
- Bad Cannstatt (Stuttgart), Germany
- Bahçelievler, Turkey
- Bene, Ukraine
- Berehove Raion, Ukraine
- District 1 (Ho Chi Minh City), Vietnam
- Prague 5 (Prague), Czech Republic
- Ruse, Bulgaria
- Sânzieni, Romania
- Târgu Mureș, Romania
- Trogir, Croatia
- Trstice, Slovakia
- Ustroń, Poland
- Yiwu, China
- Żoliborz (Warsaw), Poland

Budapest XII – Hegyvidék

- Arad, Romania

Budapest XIII

- Floridsdorf (Vienna), Austria
- Košice-Juh (Košice), Slovakia
- Ochota (Warsaw), Poland
- Osijek, Croatia
- Sovata, Romania

Budapest XIV – Zugló

- Ciceu, Romania
- Opava, Czech Republic
- Racibórz, Poland
- Racoş, Romania
- Steglitz-Zehlendorf (Berlin), Germany

Budapest XV

- Dabas, Hungary
- Donji Kraljevec, Croatia
- Liesing (Vienna), Austria
- Linyi, China
- Marzahn-Hellersdorf (Berlin), Germany
- Nad jazerom (Košice), Slovakia
- Obervellach, Austria
- Sanming, China
- Topliţa, Romania

Budapest XVI

- Tây Hồ District (Hanoi), Vietnam

Budapest XVII – Rákosmente

- Gheorgheni, Romania
- Krosno County, Poland
- Lovran, Croatia

Budapest XVIII – Pestszentlőrinc-Pestszentimre

- Artashat, Armenia
- Băile Tușnad, Romania
- Dąbrowa County, Poland
- Izvoru Crișului, Romania
- Moldava nad Bodvou, Slovakia
- Nesebar, Bulgaria
- Nin, Croatia
- Odorheiu Secuiesc, Romania
- Roding, Germany
- San Nicola la Strada, Italy
- Tiachiv, Ukraine

Budapest XIX – Kispest

- Krzeszowice, Poland
- Pendik, Turkey
- Smolyan, Bulgaria
- Sombor, Serbia
- Tășnad, Romania
- Vrbovec, Croatia

Budapest XX – Pesterzsébet

- Alushta, Ukraine
- Belin, Romania
- Cristuru Secuiesc, Romania
- Nowa Słupia, Poland
- Olgiate Comasco, Italy
- Nord-Ost (Frankfurt), Germany

Budapest XXI – Csepel

- Băile Tușnad, Romania
- Gănești, Romania
- Kielce, Poland
- Rijeka, Croatia
- Salonta, Romania
- Wołomin, Poland

Budapest XXII – Budafok-Tétény

- Baraolt, Romania
- Białołęka (Warsaw), Poland
- Bonn (Bonn), Germany
- Koson, Ukraine
- Kristianstad, Sweden
- Primorski District (Varna), Bulgaria

Budapest XXIII – Soroksár

- Nürtingen, Germany
- Odorheiu Secuiesc, Romania
- Sędziszów Małopolski, Poland
- Tongzhou (Beijing), China
- Törökbálint, Hungary
- Tvarditsa, Bulgaria

Bük

- Illingen, Germany
- Törökbálint, Hungary

== C ==
Cegléd

- Gheorgheni, Romania
- Miercurea Ciuc, Romania
- Mühldorf, Germany
- Odorheiu Secuiesc, Romania
- Plauen, Germany
- Sfântu Gheorghe, Romania
- Vasvár, Hungary
- Vlăhița, Romania

Celldömölk

- Mukachevo, Ukraine
- Neudau, Austria
- Pagnacco, Italy
- Poděbrady, Czech Republic
- Sângeorgiu de Pădure, Romania
- Serramazzoni, Italy

Császártöltés

- Deggenhausertal, Germany
- Krenglbach, Austria

Csenger

- Covasna, Romania
- Hauenstein, Germany
- Negrești-Oaș, Romania
- Tășnad, Romania
- Vetiș, Romania

Csobánka

- Wertheim, Germany

Csókakő

- Byczyna, Poland
- Malinovo, Slovakia

Csömör

- Mojmírovce, Slovakia
- Rimetea, Romania

Csongrád

- Bečej, Serbia
- Bełchatów, Poland
- Breuilaufa, France
- Le Buis, France
- Chamboret, France
- Chaptelat, France
- Nantiat, France
- Nieul, France
- Raisio, Finland
- Saint-Jouvent, France
- Thouron, France
- Vaulry, France

Csopak

- Kavarna, Bulgaria
- Myślenice, Poland
- Ortovero, Italy
- Sovata, Romania

Csorna

- Dingzhou, China
- Lunca de Sus, Romania
- Miercurea Nirajului, Romania
- Sinzing, Germany
- Zlaté Klasy, Slovakia

Csorvás

- Ozun, Romania
- Senta, Serbia
- Sládkovičovo, Slovakia

Csurgó

- Aumale, France
- Cristuru Secuiesc, Romania
- Đurđevac, Croatia
- Haimhausen, Germany
- Vráble, Slovakia
- Vrsar, Croatia

== D ==
Dabas

- Abrud, Romania
- Aiton, Romania
- Albenga, Italy
- Banská Bystrica, Slovakia
- Baraolt, Romania
- Budapest XV (Budapest), Hungary
- Kalinkovo, Slovakia
- Mukachevo, Ukraine
- Senta, Serbia
- Staunton, United States
- Tržič, Slovenia

Dány

- Baktalórántháza, Hungary
- Ciumani, Romania
- Ráckeve, Hungary
- Nenince, Slovakia

Debrecen

- Brno, Czech Republic
- Cattolica, Italy
- Jyväskylä, Finland
- Klaipėda, Lithuania
- (Republic of Ireland) County Limerick, Ireland
- Lublin, Poland
- New Brunswick, United States
- North-Eastern AO (Moscow), Russia
- Oradea, Romania
- Paderborn, Germany
- Patras, Greece
- Rishon LeZion, Israel
- Saint Petersburg, Russia
- Setúbal, Portugal
- Shumen, Bulgaria
- Syktyvkar, Russia
- Taitung, Taiwan
- Toluca, Mexico
- Tongliao, China

Decs

- Čoka, Serbia

Derecske

- Cristuru Secuiesc, Romania
- Držkovce, Slovakia
- Koszyce, Poland
- Huedin, Romania
- Mátraderecske, Hungary

Deszk

- Dealu, Romania
- Donnery, France
- Dumbrava, Romania
- Königstein, Germany
- Ninove, Belgium
- Novi Kneževac, Serbia
- Rakhiv, Ukraine
- Wiesenbach, Germany

Dévaványa

- Cristuru Secuiesc, Romania

Diósd

- Alsbach-Hähnlein, Germany
- Brâncovenești, Romania
- Cieszanów, Poland
- Keť, Slovakia
- Velyki Heivtsi, Ukraine

Domaszék

- Bački Vinogradi (Subotica), Serbia
- Lueta, Romania
- Wolbrom, Poland

Dombegyház

- Iratoșu, Romania

Dombóvár

- Kernen im Remstal, Germany
- Ogulin, Croatia
- Vir, Croatia
- Höganäs, Sweden

Dorog

- Feliceni, Romania
- Marienberg, Germany
- Wendlingen, Germany
- Žirany, Slovakia

Dunaharaszti

- Altdorf bei Nürnberg, Germany

Dunakeszi

- Casalgrande, Italy
- Cristuru Secuiesc, Romania
- Ravda (Nesebar), Bulgaria
- Stary Sącz, Poland

Dunaszeg

- Trstice, Slovakia

Dunaszentgyörgy

- Ghelința, Romania
- Nieste, Germany
- Senta, Serbia

Dunaújváros

- Alchevsk, Ukraine
- Elbasan, Albania
- Giurgiu, Romania
- İnegöl, Turkey
- Leszno, Poland
- Silistra, Bulgaria
- Sremska Mitrovica, Serbia
- Terni, Italy
- Villejuif, France
- Vukovar, Croatia

Dunavarsány

- Chetfalva, Ukraine
- Gemmingen, Germany
- Slavec, Slovakia

== E ==
Ebes

- Polička, Czech Republic

Edelény

- Bad Sobernheim, Germany
- Moldava nad Bodvou, Slovakia
- Siewierz, Poland
- Worb, Switzerland

Eger

- Cheboksary, Russia
- Dolný Kubín, Slovakia
- Esslingen am Neckar, Germany
- Gheorgheni, Romania
- Jericho, Palestine
- Kutná Hora, Czech Republic
- Mâcon, France
- Mukachevo, Ukraine
- Pori, Finland
- Przemyśl, Poland
- Sarzana, Italy

Emőd

- Praid, Romania

Encs

- Bad Dürrenberg, Germany
- Ghelința, Romania
- Kępno, Poland
- Moldava nad Bodvou, Slovakia

Enying

- Bad Urach, Germany
- Huedin, Romania
- Świerklany, Poland
- Yukamenskoye, Russia

Érd

- Kolín, Czech Republic
- Levice, Slovakia
- Lubaczów, Poland
- Poynton, England, United Kingdom
- Reghin, Romania
- Xuzhou, China

Esztergom

- Bamberg, Germany
- Cambrai, France
- Canterbury, England, United Kingdom
- Ehingen, Germany
- Espoo, Finland
- Gniezno, Poland
- Maintal, Germany
- Mariazell, Austria
- Ourém, Portugal
- Štúrovo, Slovakia
- Székesfehérvár, Hungary

== F ==
Fajsz

- Trun, France

Fehérgyarmat

- Nisko, Poland

Felsőzsolca

- Draganovo (Dobrichka), Bulgaria
- Kanjiža, Serbia
- Kráľovský Chlmec, Slovakia
- Lupeni, Romania
- Olsztynek, Poland
- Vyshkovo, Ukraine

Fényeslitke

- Laarne, Belgium

Fonyód

- Borsec, Romania
- Krotoszyn, Poland
- Leipheim, Germany
- Mettet, Belgium
- Nové Zámky, Slovakia

Fót

- Bălăușeri, Romania

== G ==
Gárdony

- Gieboldehausen, Germany
- Kirchbach, Austria
- Lesquin, France
- Mörlenbach, Germany
- Postbauer-Heng, Germany
- Salo, Finland
- Valea Crișului, Romania
- Żary, Poland

Göd

- Marignane, France
- Monthey, Switzerland
- Paleu, Romania
- Yanoshi, Ukraine

Gödöllő

- Aichach, Germany
- Bad Ischl, Austria
- Beit Aryeh-Ofarim, Israel
- Bogor, Indonesia
- Brandýs nad Labem-Stará Boleslav, Czech Republic
- Dunajská Streda, Slovakia
- Forssa, Finland
- Giessen, Germany
- Laxenburg, Austria
- Miercurea Ciuc, Romania
- Senta, Serbia
- Turnhout, Belgium
- Valdemoro, Spain
- Wageningen, Netherlands
- Zhangzhou, China
- Żywiec, Poland

Gyál

- Chibed, Romania

Gyomaendrőd

- Aiud, Romania
- Pilzno, Poland
- Schöneck, Germany

Gyömrő

- Regéc, Hungary
- Štvrtok na Ostrove, Slovakia

Gyöngyös

- Luohe, China
- Manisa, Turkey
- Pieksämäki, Finland
- Ringsted, Denmark
- Sanok, Poland
- Štip, North Macedonia
- Târgu Secuiesc, Romania
- Zeltweg, Austria

Gyönk

- Bar-le-Duc, France
- Darmstadt, Germany
- Griesheim, Germany
- Wilkau-Haßlau, Germany

Győr

- Brașov, Romania
- Colmar, France
- Erfurt, Germany
- Ingolstadt, Germany
- Kuopio, Finland
- Nizhny Novgorod, Russia
- Nof HaGalil, Israel
- Poznań, Poland
- Sindelfingen, Germany
- Wuhan, China

Győrújbarát

- Neulingen, Germany
- Rubiera, Italy
- Thorigné-Fouillard, France

Gyula

- Arad, Romania
- Budrio, Italy
- Covasna, Romania
- Ditzingen, Germany
- Krumpendorf am Wörther See, Austria
- Miercurea Ciuc, Romania
- Schenkenfelden, Austria
- Wągrowiec, Poland

== H ==
Hajdúböszörmény

- Berehove, Ukraine
- Harkány, Hungary
- Joseni, Romania
- Kraśnik, Poland
- Montesilvano, Italy
- Salonta, Romania
- Siilinjärvi, Finland
- Trogir, Croatia
- Újrónafő, Hungary

Hajdúdorog

- Lubartów, Poland
- Miercurea Nirajului, Romania
- Odorheiu Secuiesc, Romania
- Ștei, Romania

Hajdúhadház

- Łęczna, Poland

Hajdúnánás

- Piešťany, Slovakia
- Ustroń, Poland
- Valea lui Mihai, Romania

Hajdúsámson

- Belene, Bulgaria
- Sândominic, Romania

Hajdúszoboszló

- Bad Dürrheim, Germany
- Dzierżoniów, Poland
- Kežmarok, Slovakia
- Lanškroun, Czech Republic
- Târnăveni, Romania

Halásztelek

- Ilieni, Romania
- Leisnig, Germany
- Nikopol, Bulgaria
- Oggiono, Italy
- Polikraishte (Gorna Oryahovitsa), Bulgaria
- Rousínov, Czech Republic

Harkány

- Bačko Petrovo Selo (Bečej), Serbia
- Băile Tușnad, Romania
- Bruchköbel, Germany
- Crikvenica, Croatia
- Hajdúböszörmény, Hungary
- Kurchatov, Russia
- Szczawnica, Poland
- Trogir, Croatia

Hatvan

- Barberino Tavarnelle, Italy
- Berehove, Ukraine
- Jarocin, Poland
- Kokkola, Finland
- Maassluis, Netherlands
- Nižný Hrušov, Slovakia
- Târgu Secuiesc, Romania

Helvécia

- Cârța, Romania
- Sirnach, Switzerland
- Vršac, Serbia
- Zatín, Slovakia

Heves

- Breganze, Italy
- Ciumani, Romania
- Miercurea Ciuc, Romania
- Sulejów, Poland
- Tornaľa, Slovakia

Hévíz

- Čazma, Croatia
- Guilin, China
- Herbstein, Germany
- Pfungstadt, Germany
- Pyatigorsk, Russia

Hódmezővásárhely

- Arad, Romania
- Baia Mare, Romania
- Baja, Hungary
- Brețcu, Romania
- Bruckneudorf, Austria
- Debeljača (Kovačica), Serbia
- Hechingen, Germany
- Kelmė, Lithuania
- Kiskunhalas, Hungary
- Senta, Serbia
- Sokobanja, Serbia
- Solotvyno, Ukraine
- Tamar, Israel
- Turda, Romania
- Vallauris, France
- Vidin, Bulgaria
- Zgierz, Poland

Hollókő

- Boqueixón, Spain
- Gallodoro, Italy
- Hortobágy, Hungary
- Kalonda, Slovakia
- Rimetea, Romania
- Salers, France
- Șiclod (Atid), Romania

== I ==
Ibrány

- Głogów Małopolski, Poland
- Gornești, Romania
- Gradisca d'Isonzo, Italy
- Krásnohorská Dlhá Lúka, Slovakia

Inárcs

- Ada, Serbia
- Bene, Ukraine
- Reci, Romania
- Rytro, Poland
- Trstice, Slovakia

Isaszeg

- Bojanów, Poland
- Cozmeni, Romania
- Kechnec, Slovakia
- Sânmartin, Romania
- Suza (Kneževi Vinogradi), Croatia
- Trstená, Slovakia

Iváncsa

- Beckerich, Luxembourg
- Joseni, Romania

== J ==
Jánoshalma

- Băile Tușnad, Romania
- Corund, Romania
- Mirebeau, France
- Nawojowa, Poland
- Rafainovo, Ukraine
- Srbobran, Serbia
- Temerin, Serbia

Jászapáti

- Glodeni, Romania
- Kamenín, Slovakia
- Temerin, Serbia

Jászárokszállás

- Tarłów, Poland

Jászberény

- Conselve, Italy
- Lajosmizse, Hungary
- Lunca de Sus, Romania
- Sângeorgiu de Mureș, Romania
- Sedalia, United States
- Sucha Beskidzka, Poland
- Tiachiv, Ukraine
- Topoľčany, Slovakia
- Vechta, Germany
- Yazd, Iran

Jászfényszaru

- Borș, Romania
- Hat, Ukraine
- Kiskunfélegyháza, Hungary
- Zakliczyn, Poland

== K ==
=== Ka–Ke ===
Kalocsa

- Altino, Italy
- Bethlehem, Palestine
- Cristuru Secuiesc, Romania
- Kirchheim unter Teck, Germany
- Kula, Serbia
- Totana, Spain

Kaposvár

- Bath, England, United Kingdom
- Cần Thơ, Vietnam
- Darkhan, Mongolia
- Glinde, Germany
- Koprivnica, Croatia
- Miercurea Ciuc, Romania
- Rauma, Finland
- Saint-Sébastien-sur-Loire, France
- Schio, Italy
- Tver, Russia
- Üsküdar, Turkey

Kapuvár

- Biharia, Romania
- Dębica, Poland
- Dębica (rural gmina), Poland
- Hrubieszów, Poland
- Mattersburg, Austria
- Svishtov, Bulgaria

Karcag

- Cristuru Secuiesc, Romania
- Krosno Odrzańskie, Poland
- Kunszentmiklós, Hungary
- Longueau, France
- Merki District, Kazakhstan
- Moldava nad Bodvou, Slovakia
- Schwarzheide, Germany
- Stara Moravica (Bačka Topola), Serbia

Kazincbarcika

- Burgkirchen an der Alz, Germany
- Dimitrovgrad, Bulgaria
- Knurów, Poland
- Revúca, Slovakia
- Sânnicolau Mare, Romania
- Świdnica, Poland

Kecel

- Lupeni, Romania
- Schwarzenbruck, Germany

Kecskemét

- Aomori, Japan
- Berehove, Ukraine
- Coventry, England, United Kingdom
- Dornbirn, Austria
- Galanta, Slovakia
- Hyvinkää, Finland
- Lidköping, Sweden
- Nahariya, Israel
- Rüsselsheim am Main, Germany
- Sfântu Gheorghe, Romania
- Târgu Mureș, Romania
- Tekirdağ, Turkey
- Wadowice, Poland

Kenderes

- Kozy, Poland
- Predappio, Italy
- Sabinov, Slovakia
- Sânmartin, Romania

Kerekegyháza

- Hamuliakovo, Slovakia

Kerepes

- Dealu, Romania
- Dolné Obdokovce, Slovakia
- Hořice, Czech Republic
- Pabianice, Poland

Keszthely

- Alanya, Turkey
- Boppard, Germany
- Hof van Twente, Netherlands
- Jędrzejów, Poland
- Levoča, Slovakia
- Odorheiu Secuiesc, Romania
- Piwniczna-Zdrój, Poland
- Stary Sącz, Poland
- Turnov, Czech Republic

=== Ki ===
Kisbér

- Câmpia Turzii, Romania
- Eslohe, Germany
- Kolárovo, Slovakia

Kiskőrös

- Krimpen aan den IJssel, Netherlands
- Lapua, Finland
- Liptovský Mikuláš, Slovakia
- Marghita, Romania
- Nesvady, Slovakia
- Stadtlengsfeld (Dermbach), Germany
- Tarnów, Poland
- Zhenjiang, China

Kiskunfélegyháza

- Bagnols-sur-Cèze, France
- Braunfels, Germany
- Corund, Romania
- Die, France
- Feltre, Italy
- Jászfényszaru, Hungary
- Kikinda, Serbia
- Rabka-Zdrój, Poland
- Sighișoara, Romania
- Turda, Romania
- Uhrovec, Slovakia

Kiskunhalas

- Aizkraule, Latvia
- Hódmezővásárhely, Hungary
- Kanjiža, Serbia
- Kronach, Germany
- Nowy Sącz, Poland
- Sfântu Gheorghe, Romania
- Subotica, Serbia

Kiskunmajsa

- Bačka Topola, Serbia
- Bad Schönborn, Germany
- Baiyin, China
- Gheorgheni, Romania
- Lommatzsch, Germany
- Lubliniec, Poland
- Ukmergė, Lithuania

Kistarcsa

- Beluša, Slovakia
- Fanchykovo, Ukraine
- Milovice, Czech Republic
- Radomyśl nad Sanem, Poland
- Turia, Romania

Kistelek

- Gerace, Italy
- Poręba, Poland

Kisújszállás

- Eberschwang, Austria
- Pačir (Bačka Topola), Serbia
- Săcele, Romania
- Serne, Ukraine
- Spišská Nová Ves, Slovakia
- Wilamowice, Poland

Kisvárda

- Bistrița, Romania
- Hildburghausen, Germany
- Karmiel, Israel
- Kráľovský Chlmec, Slovakia
- Mukachevo, Ukraine
- Strzyżów, Poland
- Târgu Secuiesc, Romania

=== Ko–Ku ===
Komárom

- Gratwein-Straßengel, Austria
- Khust, Ukraine
- Komárno, Slovakia
- Lieto, Finland
- Naumburg, Germany
- Sebeș, Romania
- Sosnowiec, Poland

Komló

- Beiuș, Romania
- Éragny, France
- Neckartenzlingen, Germany
- Torrice, Italy
- Valpovo, Croatia

Kondoros

- Atid, Romania
- Gabčíkovo, Slovakia
- Hanhofen, Germany
- Kikinda, Serbia
- Tekovské Lužany, Slovakia

Körmend

- Heinävesi, Finland
- Fürstenfeld, Austria
- Kranenburg, Germany
- Pivdenne, Ukraine
- Rožnov pod Radhoštěm, Czech Republic

Környe

- Praid, Romania
- Tvrdošovce, Slovakia

Kőszeg is a member of the Douzelage, a town twinning association of towns across the European Union. Kőszeg also has four other twin towns.

Douzelage

- Agros, Cyprus
- Altea, Spain
- Asikkala, Finland
- Bad Kötzting, Germany
- Bellagio, Italy
- (Republic of Ireland) Bundoran, Ireland
- Chojna, Poland
- Granville, France
- Holstebro, Denmark
- Houffalize, Belgium
- Judenburg, Austria
- Marsaskala, Malta
- Meerssen, Netherlands
- Niederanven, Luxembourg
- Oxelösund, Sweden
- Preveza, Greece
- Rokiškis, Lithuania
- Rovinj, Croatia
- Sesimbra, Portugal
- Sherborne, England, United Kingdom
- Sigulda, Latvia
- Siret, Romania
- Škofja Loka, Slovenia
- Sušice, Czech Republic
- Tryavna, Bulgaria
- Türi, Estonia
- Zvolen, Slovakia

Other

- Mödling, Austria
- Senec, Slovakia
- Senj, Croatia
- Vaihingen an der Enz, Germany

Kozármisleny

- Kopačevo (Bilje), Croatia
- Ocna Mureș, Romania
- Orimattila, Finland
- Pag, Croatia
- Sezze, Italy
- Várda, Hungary

Kunhegyes

- Baia Sprie, Romania
- Feketić (Mali Iđoš), Serbia
- Szerzyny, Poland

Kunszentmárton

- Teterow, Germany

Kunszentmiklós

- Băicoi, Romania
- Blumberg, Germany
- Chepa, Ukraine
- Cristuru Secuiesc, Romania
- Karcag, Hungary
- Miggiano, Italy
- Skorenovac (Kovin), Serbia
- Suhindol, Bulgaria
- Trzemeszno, Poland
- Xagħra, Malta
- Zadvarje, Croatia

== L ==
Lajosmizse

- Felsőlajos, Hungary
- Jászberény, Hungary
- Palić (Subotica), Serbia
- Remetea, Romania

Lenti

- Bad Radkersburg, Austria
- Lendava, Slovenia
- Mursko Središće, Croatia

Lőrinci

- Sankt Lorenz, Austria

== M ==
Mád

- Heidenrod, Germany
- Vranov nad Topľou, Slovakia

Maglód

- Bene, Ukraine
- Dlhá Ves, Slovakia
- Lueta, Romania
- Mýtne Ludany, Slovakia

Magyarcsanád

- Gănești, Romania

Makó

- Ada, Serbia
- Atça (Sultanhisar), Turkey
- Bodo (Balinț), Romania
- Dumbrava, Romania
- Jasło, Poland
- Kiryat Yam, Israel
- Lugoj, Romania
- Martinsicuro, Italy
- Maumee, United States
- Miercurea Ciuc, Romania
- Radomsko, Poland
- Rusko Selo (Kikinda), Serbia
- Xinyang, China
- Želiezovce, Slovakia

Marcali

- Künzelsau, Germany
- Medulin, Croatia
- Morrovalle, Italy
- Toplița, Romania

Martfű

- Tăuții-Măgherăuș, Romania
- Tuchów, Poland

Mátészalka

- Carei, Romania
- Humenné, Slovakia
- Kolbuszowa, Poland
- Mukachevo, Ukraine
- Oberkochen, Germany
- Vittoria, Italy
- Zevenaar, Netherlands

Mezőberény

- Čantavir (Subotica), Serbia
- Gronau, Germany
- Kolárovo, Slovakia
- Münsingen, Germany
- Sovata, Romania

Mezőhegyes

- Mordano, Italy
- Ozun, Romania
- Peregu Mare, Romania
- San Giorgio di Nogaro, Italy
- Târgu Secuiesc, Romania
- Túrkeve, Hungary

Mezőkovácsháza

- Moneasa, Romania
- Praid, Romania
- Semlac, Romania
- Vinga, Romania

Mezőkövesd

- Bad Salzungen, Germany
- Petriolo, Italy
- Rüdesheim am Rhein, Germany
- Târgu Secuiesc, Romania
- Żory, Poland

Mezőtúr

- Arcuș, Romania
- Blatná na Ostrove, Slovakia
- Maków Podhalański, Poland
- Novi Bečej, Serbia
- Valea Crișului, Romania

Miskolc

- Asan, South Korea
- Aschaffenburg, Germany
- Burgas, Bulgaria
- Cleveland, United States
- Katowice, Poland
- Kayseri, Turkey
- Košice, Slovakia
- Ostrava, Czech Republic
- Tampere, Finland
- Yantai, China

Mohács

- Beli Manastir, Croatia
- Bensheim, Germany
- Beykoz, Turkey
- Câmpia Turzii, Romania
- Siemianowice Śląskie, Poland
- Sveti Filip i Jakov, Croatia
- Wattrelos, France

Mór

- Freudenberg, Germany
- Miercurea Nirajului, Romania
- Valdobbiadene, Italy
- Wolsztyn, Poland

Mórahalom

- Chamerau, Germany
- Evje og Hornnes, Norway
- Fiumalbo, Italy
- Jimbolia, Romania
- Pievepelago, Italy
- Sânmartin, Romania
- Temerin, Serbia
- Uniejów, Poland

Mosonmagyaróvár

- Berehove, Ukraine
- Hattersheim am Main, Germany
- Neusiedl am See, Austria
- Olováry, Slovakia
- Pezinok, Slovakia
- Piotrków Trybunalski, Poland
- Šamorín, Slovakia
- Senec, Slovakia
- Sfântu Gheorghe, Romania
- Stockerau, Austria

== N ==
Nádudvar

- Sălard, Romania
- Urzędów, Poland

Nagyatád

- Debeljača (Kovačica), Serbia
- Križevci, Croatia
- Nußloch, Germany
- San Vito al Tagliamento, Italy
- Târgu Secuiesc, Romania
- Tvrdošovce, Slovakia

Nagycenk is a member of the Charter of European Rural Communities, a town twinning association across the European Union. Nagycenk also has one other twin town.

Charter of European Rural Communities

- Bienvenida, Spain
- Bièvre, Belgium
- Bucine, Italy
- (Republic of Ireland) Cashel, Ireland
- Cissé, France
- Desborough, England, United Kingdom
- Esch (Haaren), Netherlands
- Hepstedt, Germany
- Ibănești, Romania
- Kandava (Tukums), Latvia
- Kannus, Finland
- Kolindros, Greece
- Lassee, Austria
- Medzev, Slovakia
- Næstved, Denmark
- Nadur, Malta
- Ockelbo, Sweden
- Pano Lefkara, Cyprus
- Põlva, Estonia
- Samuel (Soure), Portugal
- Starý Poddvorov, Czech Republic
- Strzyżów, Poland
- Svoge, Bulgaria
- Tisno, Croatia
- Troisvierges, Luxembourg
- Žagarė (Joniškis), Lithuania

Other

- Deutschkreuz, Austria

Nagyecsed

- Berveni, Romania
- Perechyn, Ukraine

Nagyhegyes

- Gănești, Romania
- Gelenau, Germany
- Puchaczów, Poland

Nagykálló

- Borša, Slovakia
- Limanowa, Poland
- Metzingen, Germany
- Miguelturra, Spain
- Tășnad, Romania
- Tiachiv, Ukraine

Nagykanizsa

- Acre, Israel
- Bihać, Bosnia and Herzegovina
- Čakovec, Croatia
- Covasna, Romania
- Gleisdorf, Austria
- Kanjiža, Serbia
- Kazanlak, Bulgaria
- Puchheim, Germany
- Salo, Finland
- Shijiazhuang, China
- Tolyatti, Russia

Nagykáta

- Alfonsine, Italy
- Negotino, North Macedonia
- Ozun, Romania

Nagykőrös

- Castrocaro Terme e Terra del Sole, Italy
- Espelkamp, Germany
- Haaksbergen, Netherlands
- Reghin, Romania
- Salonta, Romania

Nagykovácsi

- Andovce, Slovakia
- Bolatice, Czech Republic
- Canéjan, France
- Linum (Fehrbellin), Germany
- Poggio Mirteto, Italy
- Stupava, Slovakia

Nagymaros

- Gabčíkovo, Slovakia
- Grevesmühlen, Germany
- Velyki Heivtsi, Ukraine

Nyékládháza

- Chrzanów, Poland

Nyergesújfalu

- Karlsdorf-Neuthard, Germany
- Neu Wulmstorf, Germany

Nyírbátor

- Carei, Romania
- Khust, Ukraine
- Rawa Mazowiecka, Poland
- Șimleu Silvaniei, Romania
- Vynohradiv, Ukraine

Nyíregyháza

- Baia Mare, Romania
- Bielsko-Biała, Poland
- Harbin, China
- Iserlohn, Germany
- Kajaani, Finland
- Kiryat Motzkin, Israel
- Prešov, Slovakia
- Rzeszów, Poland
- Satu Mare, Romania
- St Albans, England, United Kingdom
- Uzhhorod, Ukraine

Nyírmada

- Jasov, Slovakia

Nyírtelek

- Veľký Šariš, Slovakia

== O ==
Ócsa

- Dalgety Bay and Hillend, Scotland, United Kingdom
- Kose, Estonia
- Plášťovce, Slovakia

Örkény

- Dvory nad Žitavou, Slovakia
- Koson, Ukraine
- Miercurea Nirajului, Romania
- Ulieș, Romania
- Wörth an der Donau, Germany

Orosháza

- Băile Tușnad, Romania
- Carei, Romania
- Kuusankoski (Kouvola), Finland
- Llanes, Spain
- Panjin, China
- Srbobran, Serbia
- Zomba, Hungary

Oroszlány

- Końskie, Poland
- Kuhmo, Finland
- Plochingen, Germany
- Šaľa, Slovakia

Ózd

- Bichiș, Romania
- Chorzów, Poland
- Neaua, Romania
- Rimavská Sobota, Slovakia
- Veľký Blh, Slovakia

== P ==
Paks

- Galanta, Slovakia
- Gornji Vakuf-Uskoplje, Bosnia and Herzegovina
- Loviisa, Finland
- Novovoronezh, Russia
- Reichertshofen, Germany
- Târgu Secuiesc, Romania
- Vyshkovo, Ukraine

Pápa

- Casalecchio di Reno, Italy
- Covasna, Romania
- Gorlice, Poland
- Hurbanovo, Slovakia
- Kampen, Netherlands
- Leinefelde-Worbis, Germany
- Lučenec, Slovakia
- Schwetzingen, Germany
- Vyshkovo, Ukraine

Pásztó

- Ruffec, France

Pécel

- Mistelbach, Austria
- Iisalmi, Finland

Pécs

- Arad, Romania
- Beyoğlu, Turkey
- Cluj-Napoca, Romania
- Fellbach, Germany
- Graz, Austria
- Kraków, Poland
- Kütahya, Turkey
- Lahti, Finland
- Novi Sad, Serbia
- Olomouc, Czech Republic
- Osijek, Croatia
- Seattle, United States
- Shiraz, Iran
- Shkodër, Albania
- Sliven, Bulgaria
- Terracina, Italy
- Tucson, United States
- Tuzla, Bosnia and Herzegovina
- Zagreb, Croatia

Pécsvárad

- Hausmannstätten, Austria
- Jur nad Hronom, Slovakia
- Külsheim, Germany
- Pannonhalma, Hungary
- Satu Mare, Romania
- Unterschleißheim, Germany
- Velyki Berehy, Ukraine

Pilis

- Piazza al Serchio, Italy

Piliscsév

- Igram, Slovakia
- Tvrdošovce, Slovakia

Pilisvörösvár

- Borsec, Romania
- Gerstetten, Germany
- Gröbenzell, Germany

Polgárdi

- Dinkelland, Netherlands
- Grafrath, Germany
- Petrești, Romania
- Vlčany, Slovakia

Pomáz

- Krzywiń, Poland
- Oberhausen-Rheinhausen, Germany

Püspökladány

- Fischamend, Austria
- Ghindari, Romania
- Hämeenlinna, Finland
- Hattem, Netherlands
- Krasnystaw, Poland

Putnok

- Fécamp, France
- Ludgeřovice, Czech Republic
- Nowy Żmigród, Poland
- Tisovec, Slovakia
- Tornaľa, Slovakia

== R ==
Rácalmás

- Dransfeld, Germany

Ráckeve

- Baktalórántháza, Hungary
- Calden, Germany
- Ciumani, Romania
- Dány, Hungary
- Kovin, Serbia
- Nenince, Slovakia
- Shom, Ukraine

Rajka

- Deutsch Jahrndorf, Austria
- Hamuliakovo, Slovakia

Rimóc

- Dłutów, Poland
- Kalonda, Slovakia
- Rosice, Czech Republic
- Sic, Romania
- Strenči, Latvia
- Zmajevac (Kneževi Vinogradi), Croatia

== S ==
=== Sa ===
Sajószentpéter

- Dobšiná, Slovakia
- Kobiór, Poland

Salgótarján

- Banská Bystrica, Slovakia
- Gliwice, Poland
- Kemerovo, Russia
- Lučenec, Slovakia
- Uricani, Romania
- Vantaa, Finland
- Vigarano Mainarda, Italy

Sándorfalva

- Baragiano, Italy
- Dumbrăvița, Romania
- Loitz, Germany
- Novi Bečej, Serbia

Sárbogárd

- Bene, Ukraine
- Zetea, Romania

Sarkad

- Baraolt, Romania
- Niestetal, Germany
- Salonta, Romania
- Snagov, Romania

Sárospatak

- Bardejov, Slovakia
- Collegno, Italy
- Eisenach, Germany
- Izvoru Crișului, Romania
- Jindřichův Hradec, Czech Republic
- Krosno, Poland
- Soest, Germany
- Tekirdağ, Turkey

Sárvár

- Seini, Romania
- Sonntagberg, Austria
- Steinheim an der Murr, Germany
- Uherské Hradiště, Czech Republic

Sátoraljaújhely

- Opole Lubelskie, Poland
- Sărățeni, Romania
- Sindos, Greece
- Waadhoeke, Netherlands

=== Si–Su ===
Siklós

- Aiud, Romania
- Donji Miholjac, Croatia
- Feldbach, Austria
- Fornovo di Taro, Italy
- Moldava nad Bodvou, Slovakia

Simontornya

- Marpingen, Germany
- Miercurea Nirajului, Romania
- Milies, Greece
- Steinberg, Germany

Siófok

- Daruvar, Croatia
- Gheorgheni, Romania
- Landsberg am Lech, Germany
- Netanya, Israel
- Oulu, Finland
- Pärnu, Estonia
- Poreč, Croatia
- Puerto Vallarta, Mexico
- Saint-Laurent-du-Var, France
- Waldheim, Germany
- Walnut Creek, United States

Solt

- Dănești, Romania
- Habichtswald, Germany
- Kerava, Finland

Soltvadkert

- Aiud, Romania
- Bodelshausen, Germany
- Sărmășag, Romania

Sopron

- Bad Wimpfen, Germany
- Banská Štiavnica, Slovakia
- Bolzano, Italy
- Eilat, Israel
- Eisenstadt, Austria
- Kazuno, Japan
- Kempten, Germany
- Mediaș, Romania
- Rorschach, Switzerland
- Seinäjoki, Finland
- Sparta, Greece

Sümeg

- Aichtal, Germany
- Sovata, Romania
- Tapolca, Hungary
- Vobarno, Italy

=== Sz ===
Szarvas

- Baraolt, Romania
- Bucine, Italy
- Keuruu, Finland
- Malacky, Slovakia
- Poprad, Slovakia
- Șimleu Silvaniei, Romania
- Vlăhița, Romania

Százhalombatta

- Brzesko, Poland
- Sannazzaro de' Burgondi, Italy
- Sovata, Romania

Szécsény

- Fiľakovo, Slovakia
- Kováčovce, Slovakia
- Niepołomice, Poland
- Warta, Poland

Szeged

- Cambridge, England, United Kingdom
- Darmstadt, Germany
- Kotor, Montenegro
- Larnaca, Cyprus
- Liège, Belgium
- Łódź, Poland
- Nice, France
- Odesa, Ukraine
- Parma, Italy
- Pula, Croatia
- Rakhiv, Ukraine
- Subotica, Serbia
- Târgu Mureș, Romania
- Timișoara, Romania
- Toledo, United States
- Turku, Finland
- Weinan, China

Székesfehérvár

- Alba Iulia, Romania
- Biograd na Moru, Croatia
- Birmingham, United States
- Blagoevgrad, Bulgaria
- Bratislava, Slovakia
- Cento, Italy
- Chorley, England, United Kingdom
- Erdenet, Mongolia
- Esztergom, Hungary
- Kemi, Finland
- Kocaeli, Turkey
- Luhansk, Ukraine
- Luxor, Egypt
- Miercurea Ciuc, Romania
- Opole, Poland
- Schwäbisch Gmünd, Germany
- Zadar, Croatia

Szekszárd

- Bečej, Serbia
- Bezons, France
- Bietigheim-Bissingen, Germany
- Făget, Romania
- Jajce, Bosnia and Herzegovina
- Lugoj, Romania
- Ravenna Province, Italy
- Tornio, Finland
- Waregem, Belgium

Szendrő

- Leutershausen, Germany

Szentendre

- Barbizon, France
- Godmanchester, England, United Kingdom
- Hội An, Vietnam
- Huntingdon, England, United Kingdom
- Kruševac, Serbia
- Salon-de-Provence, France
- Stari Grad, Croatia
- Târgu Secuiesc, Romania
- Uusikaupunki, Finland
- Wertheim, Germany
- Zalău, Romania

Szentes

- Bačka Topola, Serbia
- Buñol, Spain
- Dumbrăvița, Romania
- Hof Ashkelon, Israel
- Kaarina, Finland
- Markgröningen, Germany
- Sankt Augustin, Germany
- Sevlievo, Bulgaria
- Sfântu Gheorghe, Romania
- Skierniewice, Poland
- Svätuše, Slovakia

Szentgotthárd

- Delle, France
- Dilovası, Turkey
- Frumoasa, Romania
- Izola, Slovenia
- Lendava, Slovenia
- Tarvisio, Italy
- Walldürn, Germany

Szerencs

- Geisenheim, Germany
- Hesperange, Luxembourg
- Malchin, Germany
- Miercurea Nirajului, Romania
- Podgora, Croatia
- Pułtusk, Poland
- Rožňava, Slovakia

Szigethalom

- Fiľakovo, Slovakia
- Jaworzno, Poland
- Söderhamn, Sweden

Szigetszentmiklós

- Busko-Zdrój, Poland
- Gheorgheni, Romania
- Gorna Oryahovitsa, Bulgaria
- Kočani, North Macedonia
- Oulu, Finland
- Specchia, Italy
- Steinheim, Germany
- Sveti Martin na Muri, Croatia

Szigetvár

- Čakovec, Croatia
- Deva, Romania
- Eppingen, Germany
- Imatra, Finland
- Pag, Croatia
- Slatina, Croatia
- Trabzon, Turkey

Szolnok

- Baia Mare, Romania
- Bengbu, China
- Bielsko-Biała, Poland
- Eastwood, England, United Kingdom
- Forlì, Italy
- Jinzhong, China
- Rakvere, Estonia
- Reutlingen, Germany
- Riihimäki, Finland
- Sanmenxia, China
- Shoham, Israel
- Yuza, Japan

Szombathely

- Ferrara, Italy
- Hunedoara, Romania
- Kaufbeuren, Germany
- Kolding, Denmark
- (Georgia (country)) Kutaisi, Georgia
- Lappeenranta, Finland
- Lecco, Italy
- Maribor, Slovenia
- Nõmme (Tallinn), Estonia
- Oberwart, Austria
- Ramat Gan, Israel
- Santiago do Cacém, Portugal
- Trnava, Slovakia
- Uzhhorod, Ukraine
- Yantai, China
- Yoshkar-Ola, Russia

== T ==
=== Ta ===
Tamási

- Isernhagen, Germany
- Montigny-en-Gohelle, France
- Pyiterfolvo, Ukraine
- Stollberg, Germany
- Suchy Las, Poland
- Volgodonsk, Russia
- Wurzen, Germany

Tápiógyörgye

- Dosolo, Italy
- Rimetea, Romania
- Rivarolo del Re ed Uniti, Italy
- Veľký Meder, Slovakia
- Wünnewil-Flamatt, Switzerland
- Zibido San Giacomo, Italy

Tápiószecső

- Ciceu, Romania

Tápiószentmárton

- Bălăușeri, Romania
- Kolinec, Czech Republic
- Zemianska Olča, Slovakia

Tapolca

- Este, Italy
- Lempäälä, Finland
- Ružinov (Bratislava), Slovakia
- Stadthagen, Germany
- Sümeg, Hungary
- Zăbala, Romania

Tarcal

- Moldava nad Bodvou, Slovakia

Tard

- La Croix-Helléan, France
- Guillac, France
- Josselin, France

Tárnok

- Mădăraș, Romania
- Trnávka, Slovakia

Tát

- Buseck, Germany
- Căpleni, Romania
- Molln, Austria
- Obid, Slovakia

Tata

- Alkmaar, Netherlands
- Arenzano, Italy
- Bystřice, Czech Republic
- Dammarie-lès-Lys, France
- Gerlingen, Germany
- Kanjiža, Serbia
- Montebelluna, Italy
- Pińczów, Poland
- Sovata, Romania
- Svodín, Slovakia

Tatabánya

- Aalen, Germany
- Banská Štiavnica, Slovakia
- Będzin, Poland
- Christchurch, England, United Kingdom
- Izhevsk, Russia
- Odorheiu Secuiesc, Romania
- Pyiterfolvo, Ukraine

=== Te–Ti ===
Téglás

- Affalterbach, Germany
- Fulnek, Czech Republic
- Ludwin, Poland
- Tyihlash, Ukraine

Tihany

- Deidesheim, Germany
- Mauges-sur-Loire, France
- Odorheiu Secuiesc, Romania

Tiszaföldvár

- Bačko Gradište (Bečej), Serbia
- Gräfenberg, Germany
- Hérimoncourt, France
- Mielec, Poland

Tiszafüred

- Chotěboř, Czech Republic
- Płońsk, Poland
- Senta, Serbia

Tiszakécske

- Lübbecke, Germany
- Lunca de Sus, Romania

Tiszalúc

- Gănești, Romania

Tiszanána

- Baranów, Poland
- Nána, Slovakia
- Zetea, Romania

Tiszaújváros

- Berehove, Ukraine
- Dexing, China
- Friesenheim (Ludwigshafen), Germany
- Miercurea Ciuc, Romania
- Neuhofen an der Krems, Austria
- Rimavská Sobota, Slovakia
- Świętochłowice, Poland
- Zawiercie County, Poland

Tiszavasvári

- Baia Sprie, Romania
- Izvoru Crișului, Romania
- Livada, Romania
- Șimleu Silvaniei, Romania

=== To–Tu ===
Tokaj

- Binyamina-Giv'at Ada, Israel
- Cormons, Italy
- Dej, Romania
- Iwonicz-Zdrój, Poland
- Oestrich-Winkel, Germany
- Rust, Austria
- Sonoma, United States
- Supetar, Croatia

Tolna

- Ozun, Romania
- Palić (Subotica), Serbia
- Stutensee, Germany

Törökbálint

- Bük, Hungary
- Odorheiu Secuiesc, Romania
- Soroksár (Budapest), Hungary
- Süßen, Germany
- Veľké Trakany, Slovakia

Törökszentmiklós

- Lendava, Slovenia
- Nevetlenfolu, Ukraine
- Ryglice, Poland
- Senta, Serbia
- Sic, Romania

Tótkomlós

- Brețcu, Romania
- Galanta, Slovakia
- Jelšava, Slovakia
- Nădlac, Romania
- Neunkirchen am Brand, Germany
- Zvolen, Slovakia

Tura

- Jasov, Slovakia
- Sântimbru, Romania

Túrkeve

- Auchel, France
- Mezőhegyes, Hungary
- Porąbka, Poland
- Salonta, Romania
- Velykyi Bychkiv, Ukraine

== U ==
Újfehértó

- Braniștea, Romania
- Cherechiu, Romania
- Doberdò del Lago, Italy
- Hut, Ukraine
- Váhovce, Slovakia
- Żarów, Poland

Újszász

- Auzeville-Tolosane, France
- Ciceu, Romania
- Dębica (rural gmina), Poland
- Palić (Subotica), Serbia

== V ==
Vác

- Deuil-la-Barre, France
- Donaueschingen, Germany
- Dubnica nad Váhom, Slovakia
- Givatayim, Israel
- Järvenpää, Finland
- Odorheiu Secuiesc, Romania
- Otrokovice, Czech Republic
- Šahy, Slovakia
- Sarıyer, Turkey
- Tiachiv, Ukraine
- Zawadzkie, Poland

Várpalota

- Borgo San Lorenzo, Italy
- Czeladź, Poland
- Grottazzolina, Italy
- Gazipaşa, Turkey
- Kremnica, Slovakia
- Petroşani, Romania
- Sant'Elpidio a Mare, Italy
- Wolfsberg, Austria

Vásárosnamény

- Berehove, Ukraine
- Medijana (Niš), Serbia
- Ølgod (Varde), Denmark
- Sastamala, Finland
- Veľké Kapušany, Slovakia

Vecsés

- Lăzarea, Romania
- Rheinstetten, Germany

Velence

- Agia Varvara, Greece
- Ralingen, Germany
- Rosport-Mompach, Luxembourg
- Round Hill, United States

Veresegyház

- Atia (Corund), Romania
- Šahy, Slovakia
- Schneeberg, Germany

Veszprém

- Bottrop, Germany
- Fresagrandinaria, Italy
- Gladsaxe, Denmark
- Most, Czech Republic
- Nitra, Slovakia
- Nowa Sól, Poland
- Ottignies-Louvain-la-Neuve, Belgium
- Passau, Germany
- Płock, Poland
- Püttlingen, Germany
- Rovaniemi, Finland
- Saint-Michel-sur-Orge, France
- Senftenberg, Germany
- Sfântu Gheorghe, Romania
- Tarnów, Poland
- Tartu, Estonia
- Tirat Carmel, Israel
- Žamberk, Czech Republic

Villány

- Eislingen, Germany
- Stainz, Austria
- Vețca, Romania
- Zamárdi, Hungary

Visegrád

- Lanciano, Italy
- Obergünzburg, Germany

== Z ==
Zalaegerszeg

- Baraolt, Romania
- Berehove, Ukraine
- Dobrich, Bulgaria
- Gorizia, Italy
- Kherson, Ukraine
- Klagenfurt, Austria
- Krosno, Poland
- Kusel, Germany
- Lendava, Slovenia
- Marl, Germany
- Surgut, Russia
- Târgu Mureş, Romania
- Varaždin, Croatia
- Varkaus, Finland
- Zenica, Bosnia and Herzegovina

Zalakaros

- Asperhofen, Austria
- Puchheim, Germany
- Olesno, Poland

Zalaszentgrót

- Germersheim, Germany

Zamárdi

- Malsch, Germany
- Mošćenička Draga, Croatia
- Ustrzyki Dolne, Poland
- Vețca, Romania
- Villány, Hungary

Zirc

- Baraolt, Romania
- Dertsen, Ukraine
- Nivala, Finland
- Pohlheim, Germany

Zsámbék

- Mărtiniș, Romania
- Miglianico, Italy
- Wettenberg, Germany
- Zawiercie, Poland
