= Ciumani =

Ciumani Gyergyócsomafalva
- Commune
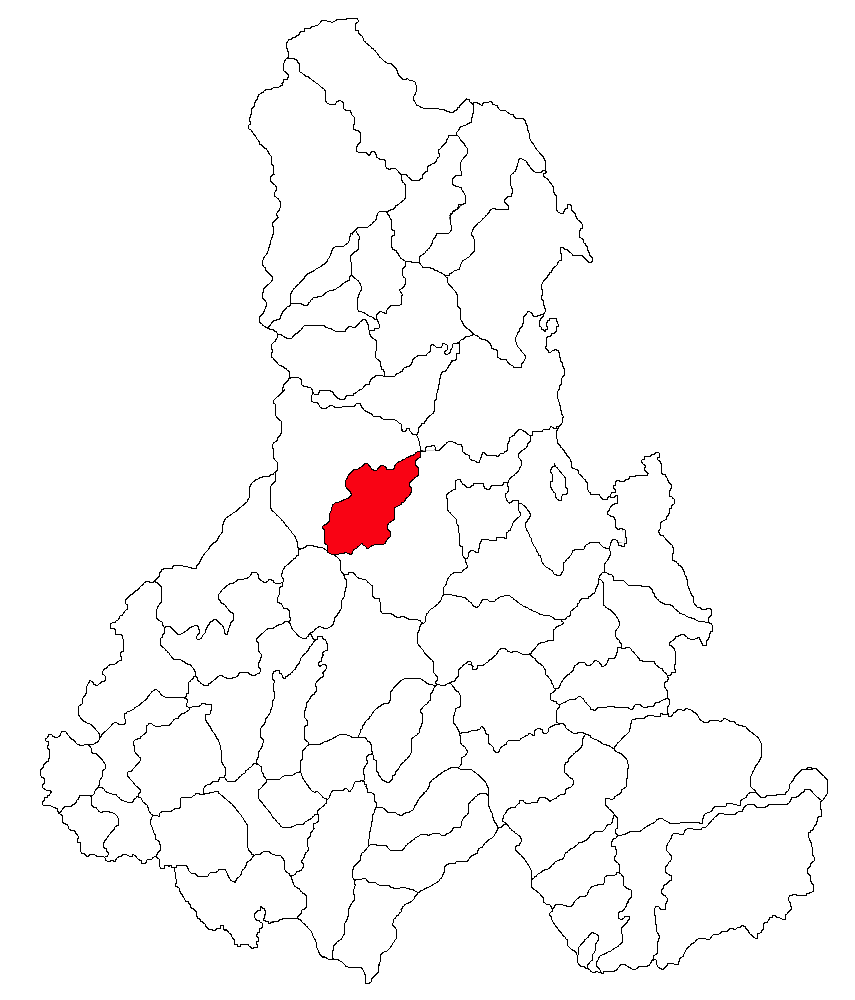
- Location in Harghita County

- Location in Romania
- Coordinates: 46°41′0″N 25°31′0″E
- Country: Romania
- County: Harghita

Government
  - Mayor (2020–2024): László-Szilárd Márton (UDMR)
- Area: 96.83 km^{2} (37.39 sq mi)
- Population (2021-12-01): 3,881
  - Density: 40.08/km^{2} (103.8/sq mi)
- Time zone: UTC+02:00 (EET)
  - Summer (DST): UTC+03:00 (EEST)
- Postal code: 537050
- Area code: +40 266
- Vehicle reg.: HR
- Website: www.csomafalva.info

Ciumani (Hungarian: Gyergyócsomafalva, Hungarian pronunciation: [ˈɟɛrɟoːtʃomɒfɒlvɒ]) is a commune in Harghita County, Romania. It lies in the Székely Land, an ethno-cultural region in eastern Transylvania. It is composed of a single village, Ciumani.

== Governance ==
It belonged first to the Székely seat of Gyergyószék, which was subsequently absorbed into Csíkszék, then, from 1876 until 1918, to Csík County in the Kingdom of Hungary. After World War I, by the terms of the Treaty of Trianon of 1920, it became part of Romania. As a result of the Second Vienna Award, it belonged to Hungary again between 1940 and 1944. After World War II, it came under Romanian administration and became part of Romania in 1947. Between 1952 and 1960, it formed part of the Hungarian Autonomous Province, then, of the Mureș-Hungarian Autonomous Province until it was abolished in 1968. Since then, the commune has been part of Harghita County.

== Demographics ==
At the 2011 census, the commune had a population of 4,328; out of them, 99% were Hungarian and 0.2% were Romanian. 98% of the commune population are Roman Catholic, 0.8% are Reformed and 0.3% are Orthodox.

== Twin towns and sister cities ==
- Baktalórántháza, Hungary
- Dány, Hungary
- Erdőbénye, Hungary
- Heves, Hungary
- Ráckeve, Hungary
- Nenince, Slovakia
- Totovo Selo, Serbia
- Kanjiža, Serbia
