= Trstice =

Trstice Nádszeg
- Municipality
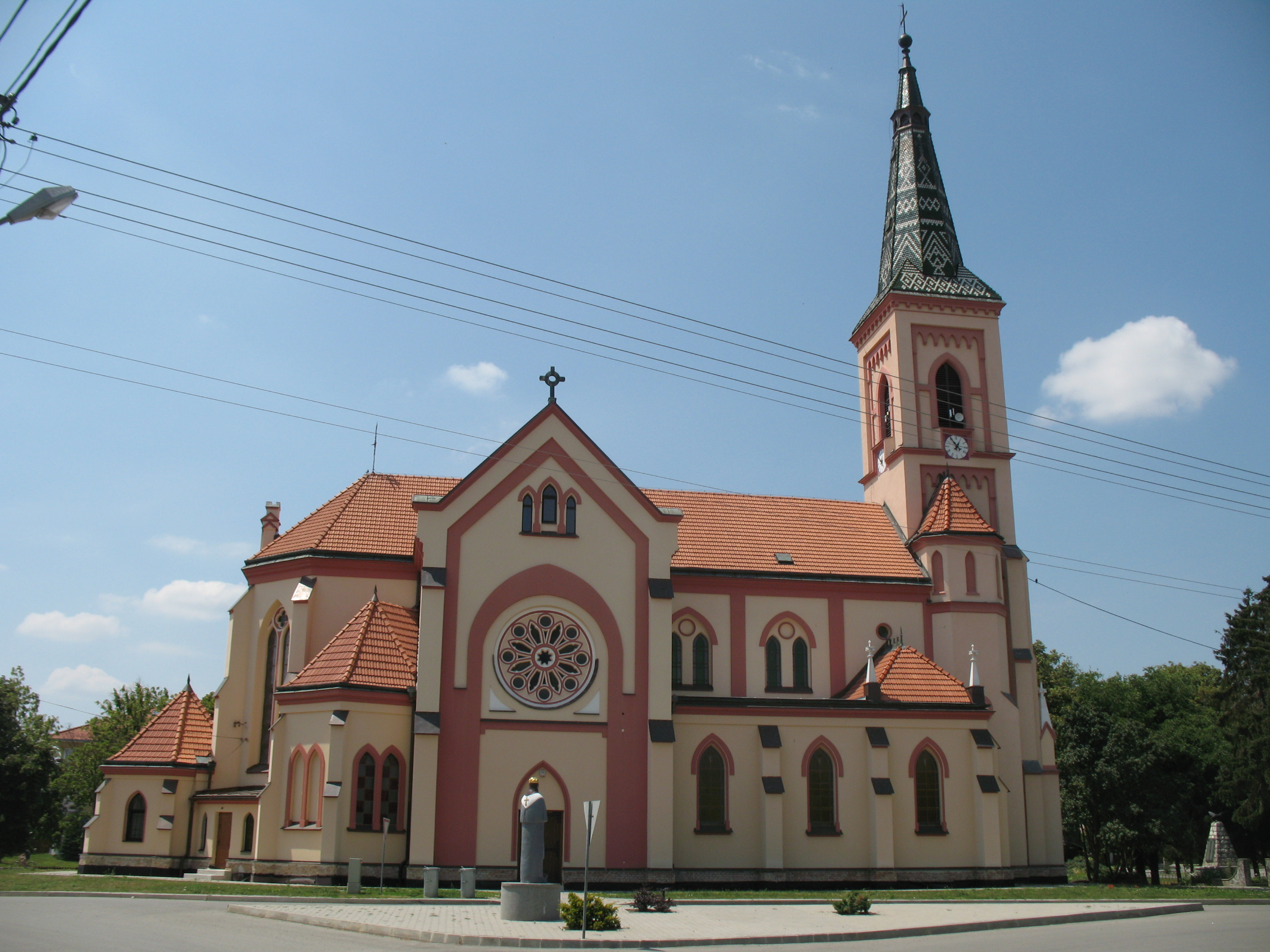
- Catholic church

- Flag

- Location of Trstice in the Trnava Region Location of Trstice in Slovakia
- Coordinates: 48.02°N 17.81°E
- Country: Slovakia
- Region: Trnava Region
- District: Galanta District
- First mentioned: 1554

Government
  - Mayor: Eva Kacz

Area
  - Total: 20.26 km^{2} (7.82 sq mi)
- Elevation: 111 m (364 ft)

Population (2025)
  - Total: 3,814
- Time zone: UTC+1 (CET)
  - Summer (DST): UTC+2 (CEST)
- Postal code: 925 42
- Area code: +421 31
- Vehicle registration plate (until 2022): GA
- Website: trstice.sk/sk/

Trstice (Hungarian: Nádszeg) is a large village and municipality in Galanta District of the Trnava Region of south-west Slovakia.

== Geography ==
The municipality lies at an altitude of 111 metres (364 ft) and covers an area of 20.26 km^{2} (7.82 sq mi) (2025).

== History ==
In the 9th century, with the arrival of the Hungarian tribes (magyars), the territory of Trstice became part of the Kingdom of Hungary. In historical records the village was first mentioned in 1554. Before the establishment of independent Czechoslovakia in 1918, it was part of Pozsony County. After the Austro-Hungarian army disintegrated in November 1918, Czechoslovak troops liberated the area, later acknowledged internationally by the Treaty of Trianon. Between 1938 and 1945 Trstice was occupied by Miklós Horthy's Hungary through the First Vienna Award. From 1945 until the Velvet Divorce, it was part of Czechoslovakia. Since then it has been part of Slovakia.

== Population ==
Population statistic (10 years)
Year	1995	2005	2015	2025
Count	3730	3764	3739	3814
Difference		+0.91%	−0.66%	+2.00%

Population statistic
Year	2024	2025
Count	3816	3814
Difference		−0.05%

It has a population of 3814 people (31 December 2025).

=== Ethnicity ===
Census 2021 (1+ %)
Ethnicity	Number	Fraction
Hungarian	3378	87.42%
Slovak	519	13.43%
Not found out	170	4.39%
Total	3864	

In year 2021 was 3864 people by ethnicity 3378 as Hungarian, 519 as Slovak, 170 as Not found out, 14 as Czech, 5 as Other, 4 as Romani, 3 as Vietnamese, 2 as Ukrainian, 2 as Italian, 2 as Austrian, 1 as Serbian, 1 as Russian, 1 as Romanian and 1 as French.

Note on population: The difference values of population numbers in the table "Population statistic" and in the sections "Ethnicity" & "Religion" is caused by the use of various statistical methods.

=== Religion ===
Census 2021 (1+ %)
Religion	Number	Fraction
Roman Catholic Church	3309	85.64%
None	334	8.64%
Not found out	95	2.46%
Calvinist Church	39	1.01%
Total	3864	

In year 2021 was 3864 people by religion 3309 from Roman Catholic Church, 334 from None, 95 from Not found out, 39 from Calvinist Church, 28 from Evangelical Church, 19 from Greek Catholic Church, 18 from Christian Congregations in Slovakia, 5 from Other and not ascertained christian church, 4 from Old Catholic Church, 3 from Eastern Orthodox Church, 3 from Other, 2 from Ad hoc movements, 1 from Jehovah's Witnesses, 1 from Islam, 1 from Hinduism, 1 from United Methodist Church and 1 from Buddhism.

== International relations ==
=== Twin towns – Sister cities ===
Trstice is twinned with:

- Újbuda, Budapest, Hungary
