= Tvrdošovce =

Tvrdošovce Tardoskedd
- Municipality
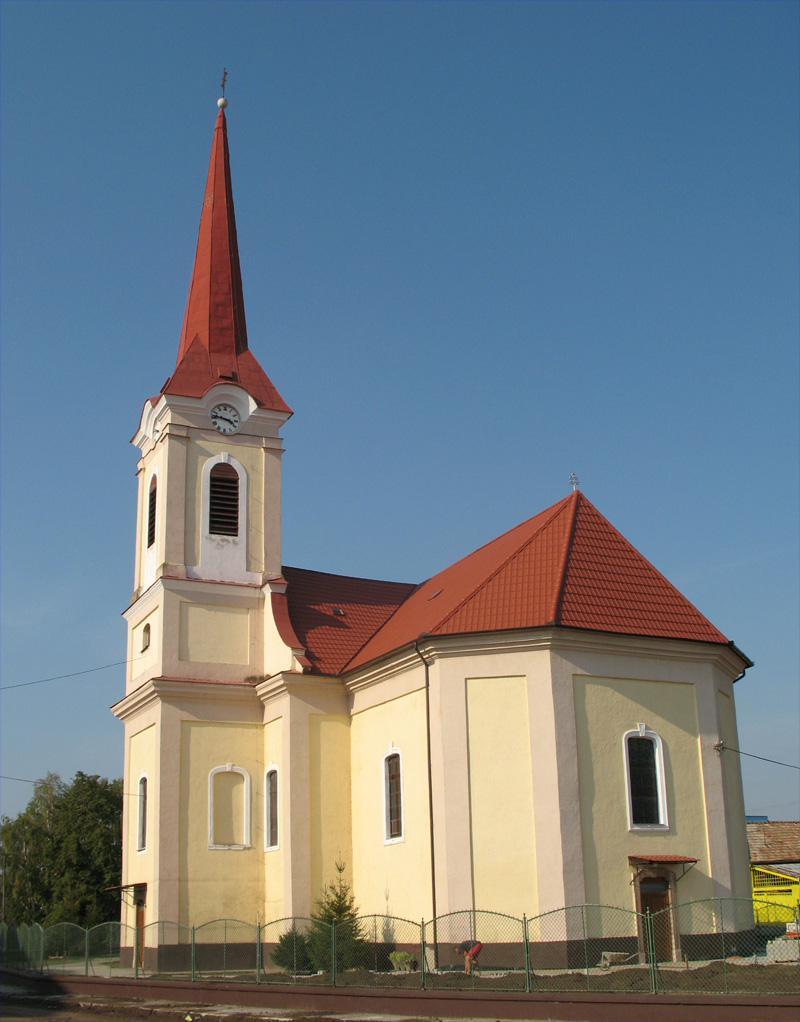
- Church of Saint Stephen

- Flag

- Location of Tvrdošovce in the Nitra Region Location of Tvrdošovce in Slovakia
- Coordinates: 48.09°N 18.06°E
- Country: Slovakia
- Region: Nitra Region
- District: Nové Zámky District
- First mentioned: 1221

Government
  - Mayor: Marián Tóth (MOST-HÍD)

Area
  - Total: 55.55 km^{2} (21.45 sq mi)
- Elevation: 119 m (390 ft)

Population (2025)
  - Total: 5,035
- Time zone: UTC+1 (CET)
  - Summer (DST): UTC+2 (CEST)
- Postal code: 941 10
- Area code: +421 35
- Vehicle registration plate (until 2022): NZ
- Website: www.tvrdosovce.sk

Tvrdošovce (Hungarian: Tardoskedd) is a large village and municipality in the Nové Zámky District in the Nitra Region of south-west Slovakia.

== Geography ==
The municipality lies at an altitude of 119 metres (390 ft) and covers an area of 55.55 km^{2} (21.45 sq mi) (2025).

== History ==
In historical records, the village was first mentioned in 1221. After the Austro-Hungarian army disintegrated in November 1918, Czechoslovak troops occupied the area, later acknowledged internationally by the Treaty of Trianon. Between 1938 and 1945 Tvrdošovce once more became part of Miklós Horthy's Hungary through the First Vienna Award. From 1945 until the Velvet Divorce, it was part of Czechoslovakia. Since then it has been part of Slovakia.

== Population ==
Population statistic (10 years)
Year	1995	2005	2015	2025
Count	5122	5285	5153	5035
Difference		+3.18%	−2.49%	−2.28%

Population statistic
Year	2024	2025
Count	5062	5035
Difference		−0.53%

It has a population of 5035 people (31 December 2025).

=== Ethnicity ===
Census 2021 (1+ %)
Ethnicity	Number	Fraction
Hungarian	3017	58.2%
Slovak	2172	41.9%
Not found out	267	5.15%
Total	5183	

In year 2021 was 5183 people by ethnicity 3017 as Hungarian, 2172 as Slovak, 267 as Not found out, 35 as Czech, 33 as Romani, 9 as Vietnamese, 8 as German, 7 as Other, 5 as Russian, 4 as Italian, 3 as Turkish, 2 as Chinese, 2 as Ukrainian, 1 as Jewish, 1 as Moravian, 1 as English and 1 as Albanian.

Note on population: The difference values of population numbers in the table "Population statistic" and in the sections "Ethnicity" & "Religion" is caused by the use of various statistical methods.

=== Religion ===
Census 2021 (1+ %)
Religion	Number	Fraction
Roman Catholic Church	4010	77.37%
None	693	13.37%
Not found out	279	5.38%
Total	5183	

In year 2021 was 5183 people by religion 4010 from Roman Catholic Church, 693 from None, 279 from Not found out, 47 from Evangelical Church, 38 from Calvinist Church, 30 from Christian Congregations in Slovakia, 30 from Greek Catholic Church, 9 from Jehovah's Witnesses, 6 from Eastern Orthodox Church, 6 from Paganism and natural spirituality, 6 from Islam, 6 from Other, 5 from Other and not ascertained christian church, 5 from Buddhism, 3 from Hinduism, 3 from Church of Jesus Christ of Latter-day Saints, 2 from Seventh-day Adventist Church, 1 from United Methodist Church, 1 from Czechoslovak Hussite Church, 1 from Baptists Church, 1 from Bahá'i Community and 1 from Ad hoc movements.

== Facilities ==
The village has a small public library, swimming pool, gym and a football pitch.

== Photos ==
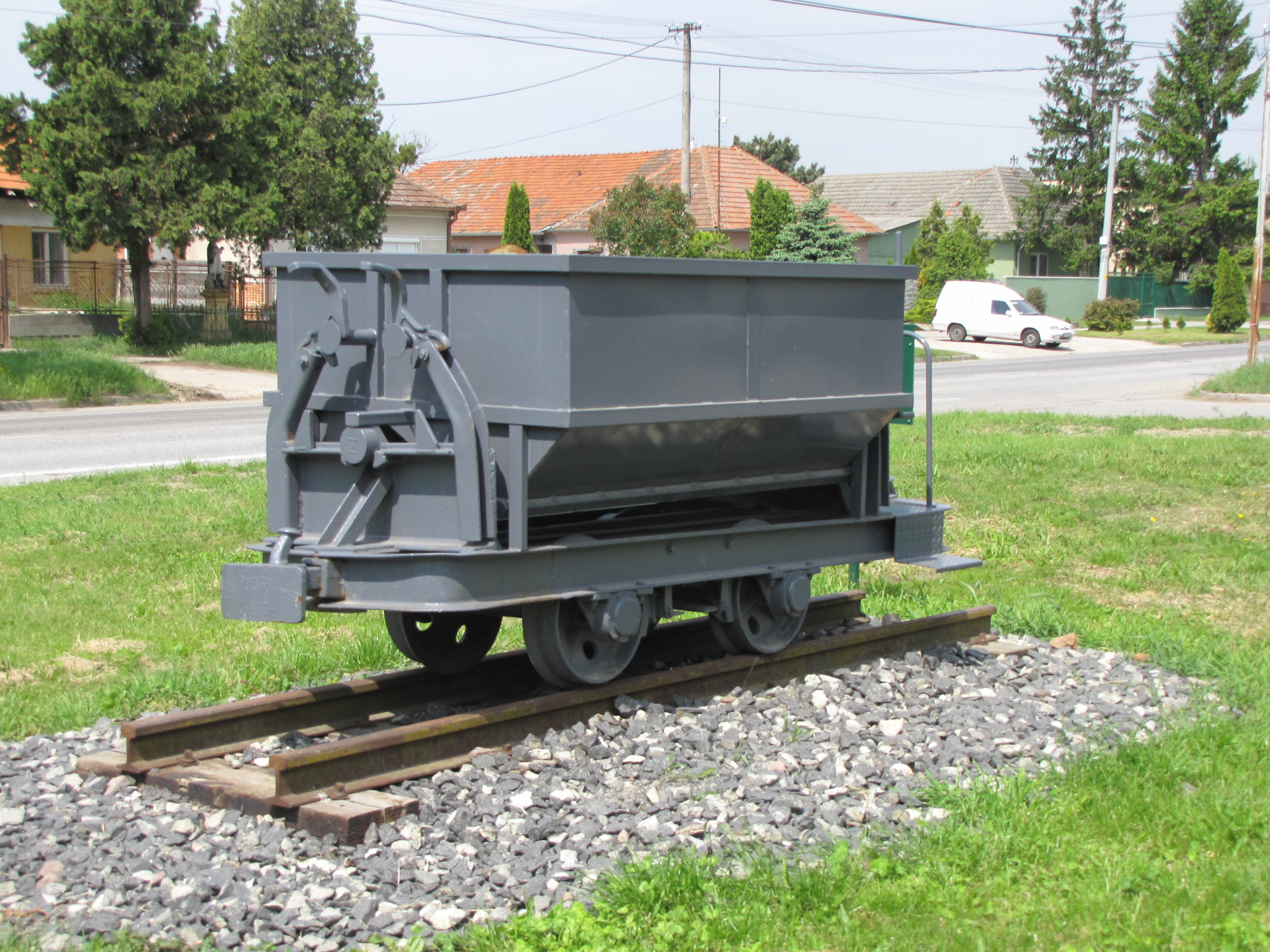
open air railway museum

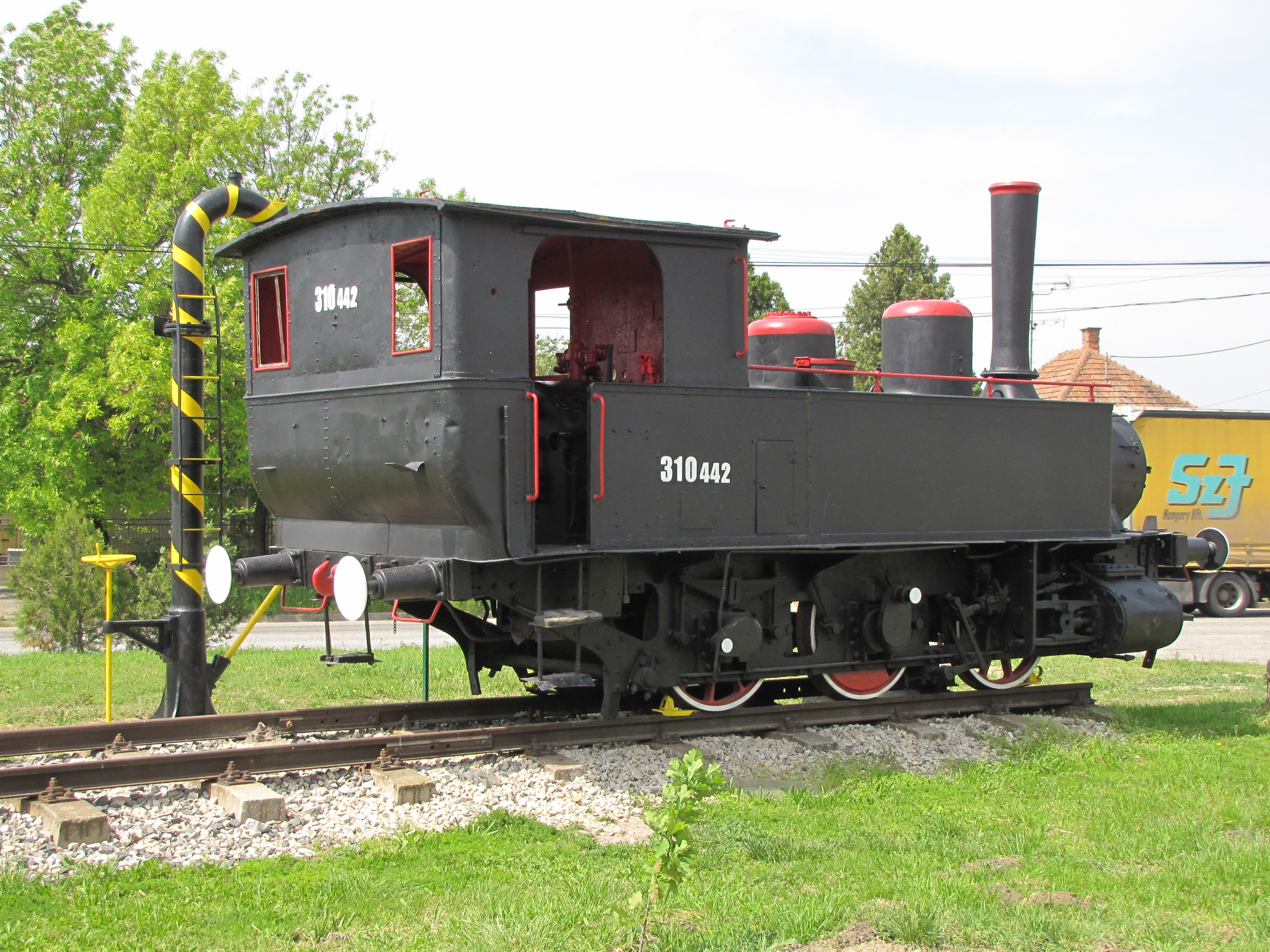
open air railway museum

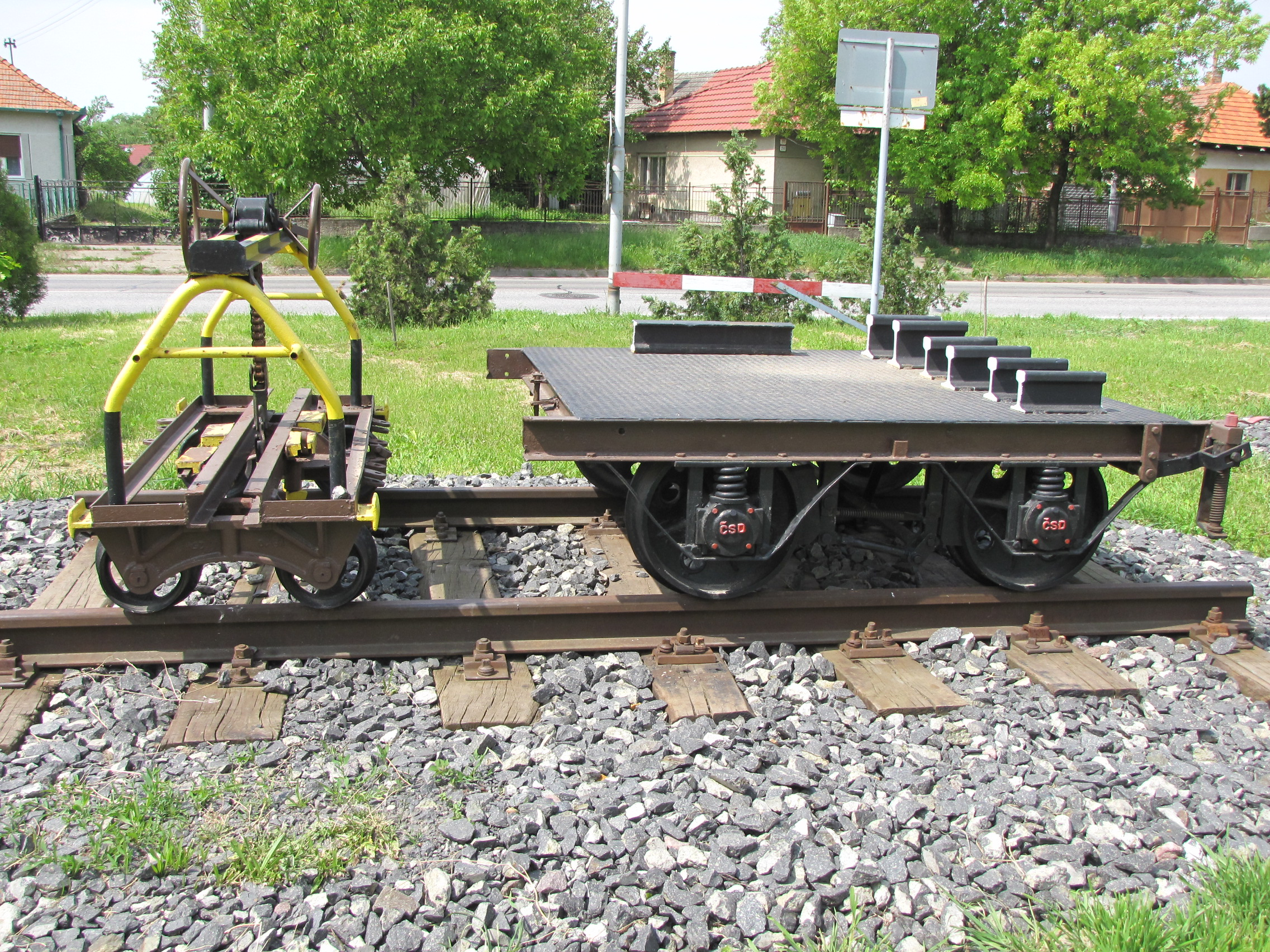
open air railway museum
