= Jur nad Hronom =

Village and municipality in Slovakia

- Municipality
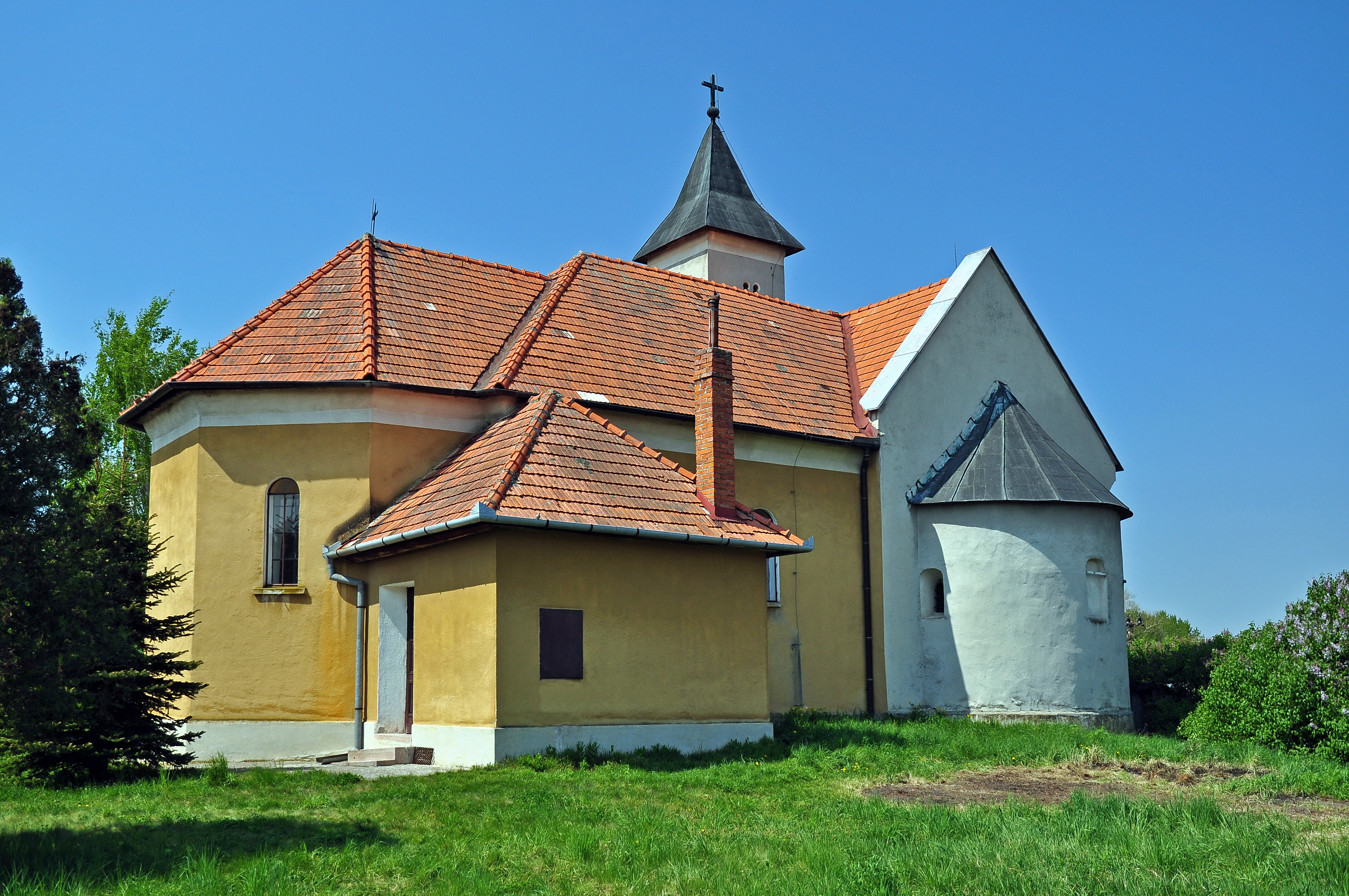
- Church of St George, Jur nad Hronom

- Flag Coat of arms

- Location of Jur nad Hronom in the Nitra Region Location of Jur nad Hronom in Slovakia
- Coordinates: 48.13°N 18.63°E
- Country: Slovakia
- Region: Nitra Region
- District: Levice District
- First mentioned: 1276

Area
  - Total: 15.18 km^{2} (5.86 sq mi)
- Elevation: 146 m (479 ft)

Population (2025)
  - Total: 971
- Time zone: UTC+1 (CET)
  - Summer (DST): UTC+2 (CEST)
- Postal code: 935 57
- Area code: +421 36
- Vehicle registration plate (until 2022): LV
- Website: www.jurnadhronom.sk/vseobecne.html

Jur nad Hronom (Hungarian: Garamszentgyörgy) is a village and municipality in the Levice District in the Nitra Region of Slovakia.

== History ==
In historical records the village was first mentioned in 1276.

== Geography ==
The municipality lies at an altitude of 146 metres (479 ft) and covers an area of 15.18 km^{2} (5.86 sq mi) (2025).

== Population ==
Population statistic (10 years)
Year	1995	2005	2015	2025
Count	942	931	976	971
Difference		−1.16%	+4.83%	−0.51%

Population statistic
Year	2024	2025
Count	984	971
Difference		−1.32%

It has a population of 971 people (31 December 2025).

=== Ethnicity ===
Census 2021 (1+ %)
Ethnicity	Number	Fraction
Slovak	679	69.07%
Hungarian	265	26.95%
Not found out	51	5.18%
Czech	14	1.42%
Total	983	

In year 2021 was 983 people by ethnicity 679 as Slovak, 265 as Hungarian, 51 as Not found out, 14 as Czech, 1 as Romani, 1 as Rusyn and 1 as Croatian.

Note on population: The difference values of population numbers in the table "Population statistic" and in the sections "Ethnicity" & "Religion" is caused by the use of various statistical methods.

=== Religion ===
Census 2021 (1+ %)
Religion	Number	Fraction
Roman Catholic Church	320	32.55%
None	267	27.16%
Evangelical Church	178	18.11%
Calvinist Church	121	12.31%
Not found out	65	6.61%
Church of the Brethren	15	1.53%
Total	983	

In year 2021 was 983 people by religion 320 from Roman Catholic Church, 267 from None, 178 from Evangelical Church, 121 from Calvinist Church, 65 from Not found out, 15 from Church of the Brethren, 4 from Hinduism, 4 from Greek Catholic Church, 4 from Ad hoc movements, 2 from Paganism and natural spirituality, 1 from Other and not ascertained christian church, 1 from Christian Congregations in Slovakia and 1 from United Methodist Church.

== Facilities ==
The village has a public library a gym and soccer pitch.

== Genealogical resources ==
The records for genealogical research are available at the state archive "Statny Archiv in Nitra, Slovakia"

- Roman Catholic church records (births/marriages/deaths): 1654-1903 (parish B)
- Reformated church records (births/marriages/deaths): 1785-1901 (parish A)

== See also ==
- List of municipalities and towns in Slovakia
