= Ciceu =

Ciceu Csíkcsicsó
- Commune
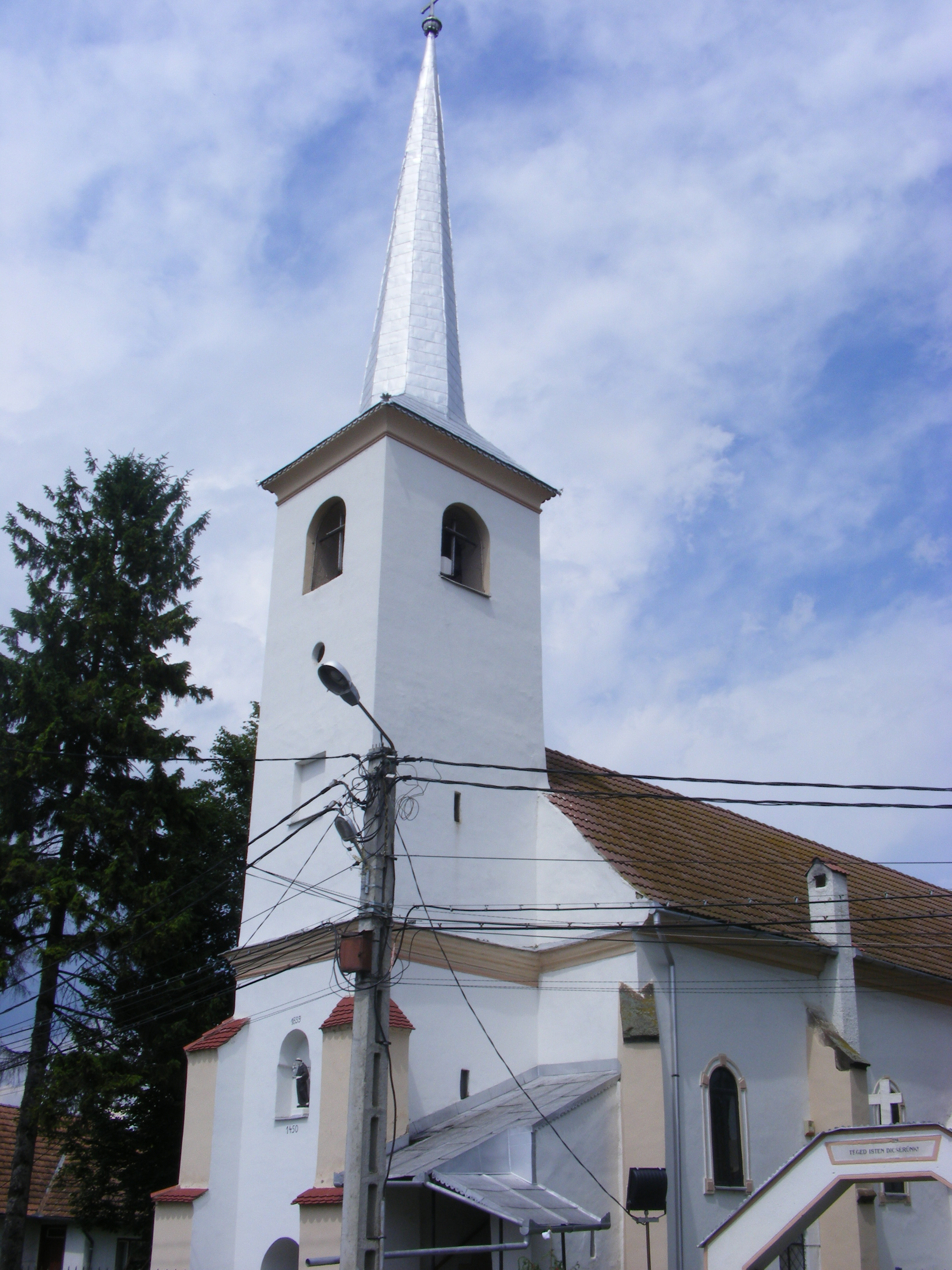

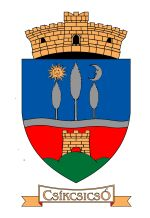
- Coat of arms

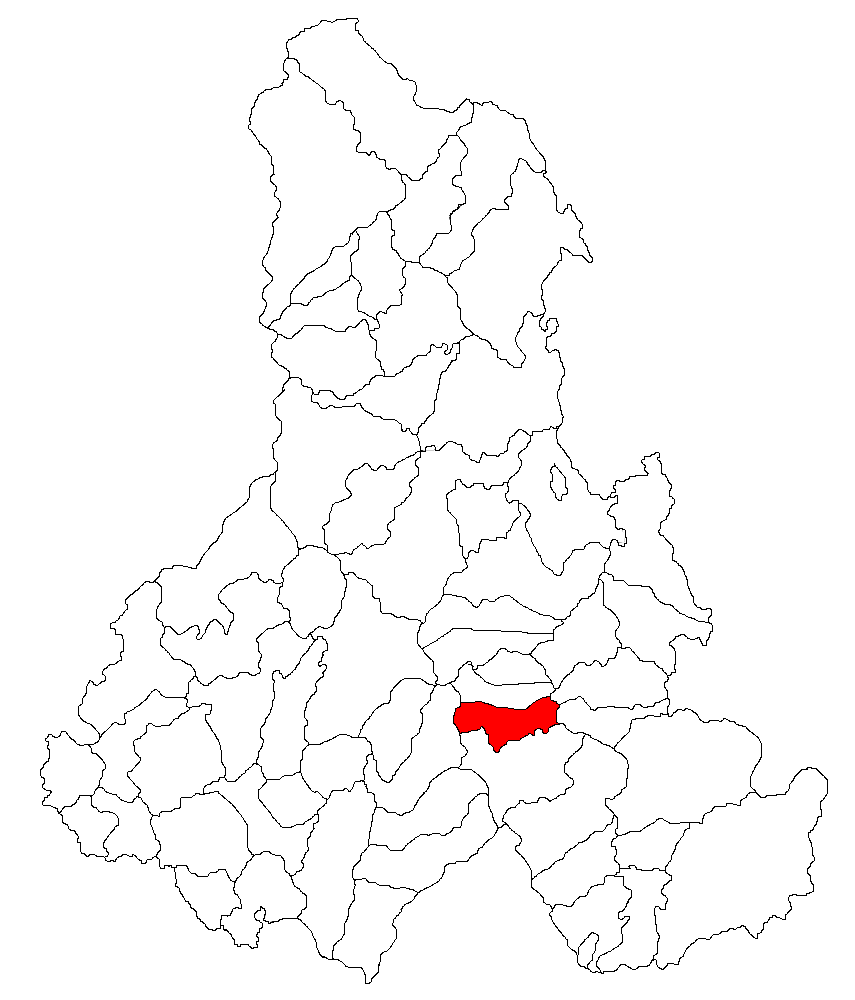
- Location in Harghita County

- Location in Romania
- Coordinates: 46°25′N 25°47′E
- Country: Romania
- County: Harghita

Government
  - Mayor (2020–2024): Lukács Péter (AMT)
- Area: 69.41 km^{2} (26.80 sq mi)
- Elevation: 689 m (2,260 ft)
- Population (2021-12-01): 2,711
  - Density: 39.06/km^{2} (101.2/sq mi)
- Time zone: UTC+02:00 (EET)
  - Summer (DST): UTC+03:00 (EEST)
- Postal code: 537297
- Area code: +40 266
- Vehicle reg.: HR
- Website: www.csikcsicso.ro

Ciceu (Hungarian: Csíkcsicsó [ˈt͡ʃiːkt͡ʃit͡ʃoː], or colloquially Csicsó [ˈt͡ʃit͡ʃoː]) is a commune in Romania, located in Harghita County. It lies in the Székely Land, an ethno-cultural region in eastern Transylvania. The commune is composed of two villages:

- Ciaracio / Csaracsó
- Ciceu / Csíkcsicsó

== History ==
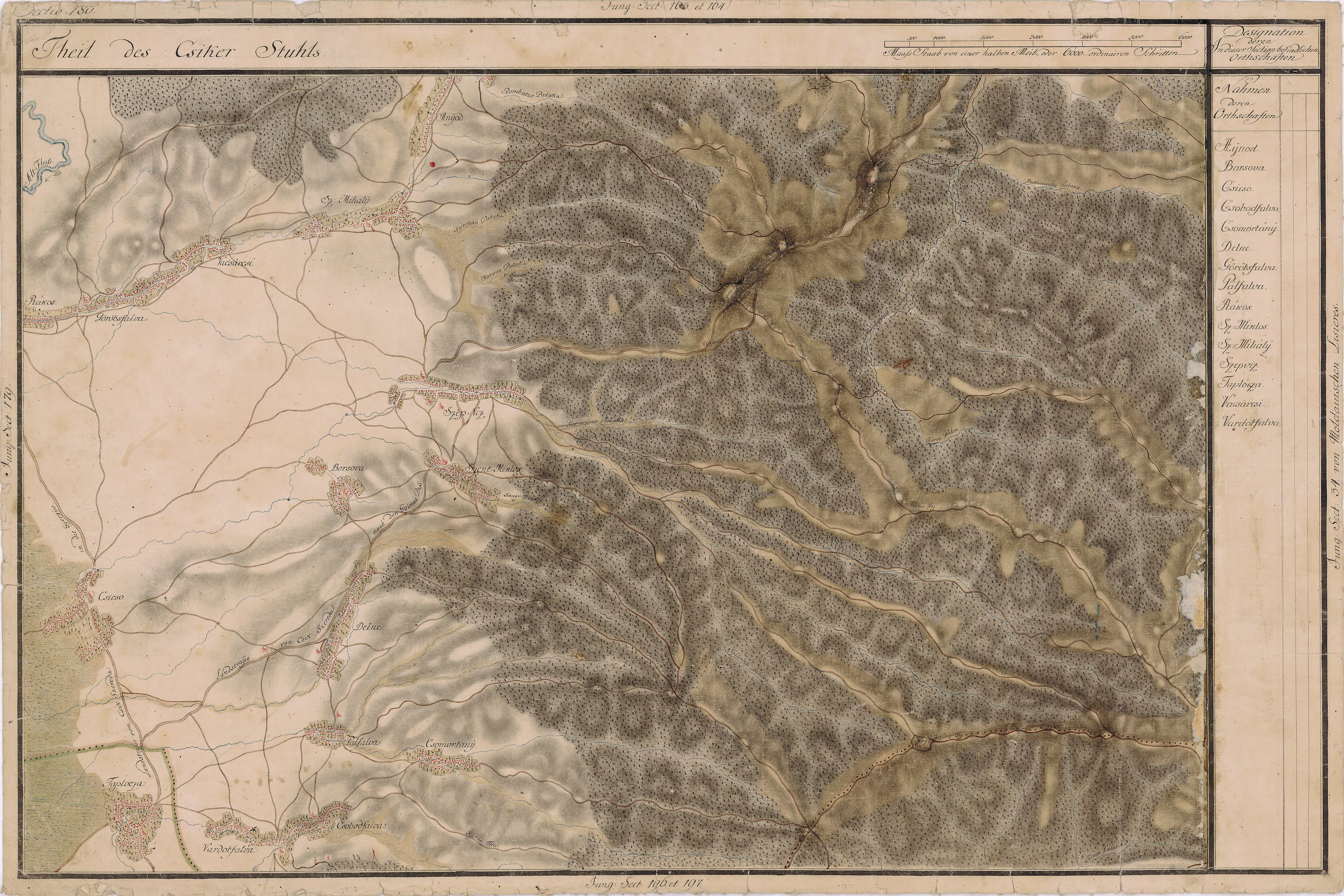
The village in the Josephinische Landaufnahme, 1769-73

The remains of its small castle can be seen on a ridge west of the village which was probably built further to a royal decree after the Mongol invasion of 1241-42. Its history is not known. According to the local tradition, the friars of the Csíksomlyó Franciscan Monastery had lived in the castle before their monastery was built. The village was mentioned in 1566 as Chijchijo. David Petky was occupied and destroyed by Imperial General Acton. here in 1706. The village used to have a chapel which stood on the hilltop and was named in the honour of St. Francis.

The village formed part of the Székely seat of Csíkszék, then from 1876 until 1918 to the Csík County in the Kingdom of Hungary. After the Treaty of Trianon of 1920, it became part of Romania and fell within Ciuc County during the interwar period. In 1940, the second Vienna Award granted the Northern Transylvania to Hungary and it was held by Hungary until 1944. After Soviet occupation, the Romanian administration returned and the town became officially part of Romania in 1947. Between 1952 and 1960, the commune fell within the Magyar Autonomous Region, between 1960 and 1968 the Mureș-Magyar Autonomous Region. In 1968, the province was abolished, and since then, the commune has been part of Harghita County.

== Demographics ==
In 1910, the commune had 2225 Hungarian residents. In 1992, of the 2540 inhabitants 2500 were Hungarians and 39 Romanians. At the 2011 census, the commune had a population of 2,679; out of them, 98% were Hungarian and 1.2% were Romanian.

== Transport ==
Its railway station is an important junction of the so-called Szekler circular railway.
