= Svätuše =

Village and municipality in south-eastern Slovakia

Svätuše Bodrogszentes
- Municipality
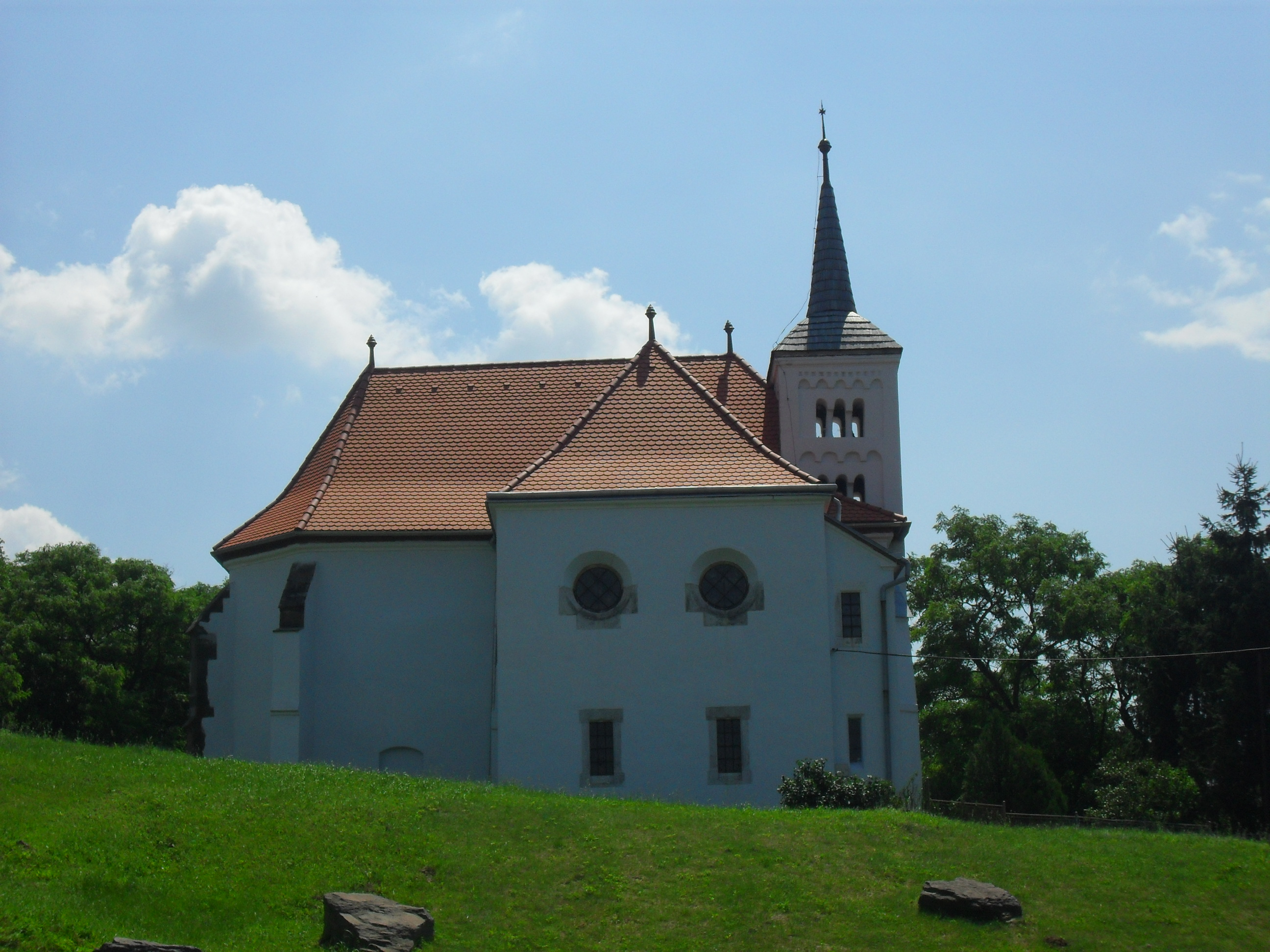
- Reformed church in the village

- Flag

- Location of Svätuše in the Košice Region Location of Svätuše in Slovakia
- Coordinates: 48.43°N 21.92°E
- Country: Slovakia
- Region: Košice Region
- District: Trebišov District
- First mentioned: 1245

Area
  - Total: 10.15 km^{2} (3.92 sq mi)
- Elevation: 98 m (322 ft)

Population (2025)
  - Total: 809
- Time zone: UTC+1 (CET)
  - Summer (DST): UTC+2 (CEST)
- Postal code: 768 3
- Area code: +421 56
- Vehicle registration plate (until 2022): TV
- Website: www.svatuse.eu

Svätuše (Slovak pronunciation: [ˈsʋɛɐtuʂe]; Hungarian: Bodrogszentes) is a village and municipality in the Trebišov District in the Košice Region of south-eastern Slovakia. As of 2021, the village's population was 86% Hungarian.

== History ==
In historical records, the village was first mentioned in 1245 by the Hungarian name "Scuntes". At this point, the village had a Roman Catholic Church dedicated to all saints.

Until the Treaty of Trianon in 1920 the village was part of Zemplén County, Kingdom of Hungary. Between 1939 and 1945, the village was again a part of the Kingdom of Hungary, but following the Second World War, it was incorporated into the modern state of Slovakia.

== Geography ==
The municipality lies at an altitude of 98 metres (322 ft) and covers an area of 10.15 km^{2} (3.92 sq mi) (2025).

== Population ==
Population statistic (10 years)
Year	1995	2005	2015	2025
Count	899	904	815	809
Difference		+0.55%	−9.84%	−0.73%

Population statistic
Year	2024	2025
Count	810	809
Difference		−0.12%

It has a population of 809 people (31 December 2025).

=== Ethnicity ===
Census 2021 (1+ %)
Ethnicity	Number	Fraction
Hungarian	697	89.47%
Slovak	119	15.27%
Not found out	16	2.05%
Total	779	

In year 2021 was 779 people by ethnicity 697 as Hungarian, 119 as Slovak, 16 as Not found out, 7 as Czech, 5 as Ukrainian and 1 as Other.

Note on population: The difference values of population numbers in the table "Population statistic" and in the sections "Ethnicity" & "Religion" is caused by the use of various statistical methods.

=== Religion ===
Census 2021 (1+ %)
Religion	Number	Fraction
Calvinist Church	484	62.13%
Roman Catholic Church	139	17.84%
Greek Catholic Church	59	7.57%
None	43	5.52%
Jehovah's Witnesses	18	2.31%
Evangelical Church	18	2.31%
Not found out	13	1.67%
Total	779	

In year 2021 was 779 people by religion 484 from Calvinist Church, 139 from Roman Catholic Church, 59 from Greek Catholic Church, 43 from None, 18 from Jehovah's Witnesses, 18 from Evangelical Church, 13 from Not found out, 1 from Jewish community, 1 from Eastern Orthodox Church, 1 from Other and not ascertained christian church, 1 from Christian Congregations in Slovakia and 1 from Ad hoc movements.

== Facilities ==
The village has a public library, a soccer pitch and a church.
