= Izvoru Crișului =

Izvoru Crișului Körösfő
- Commune
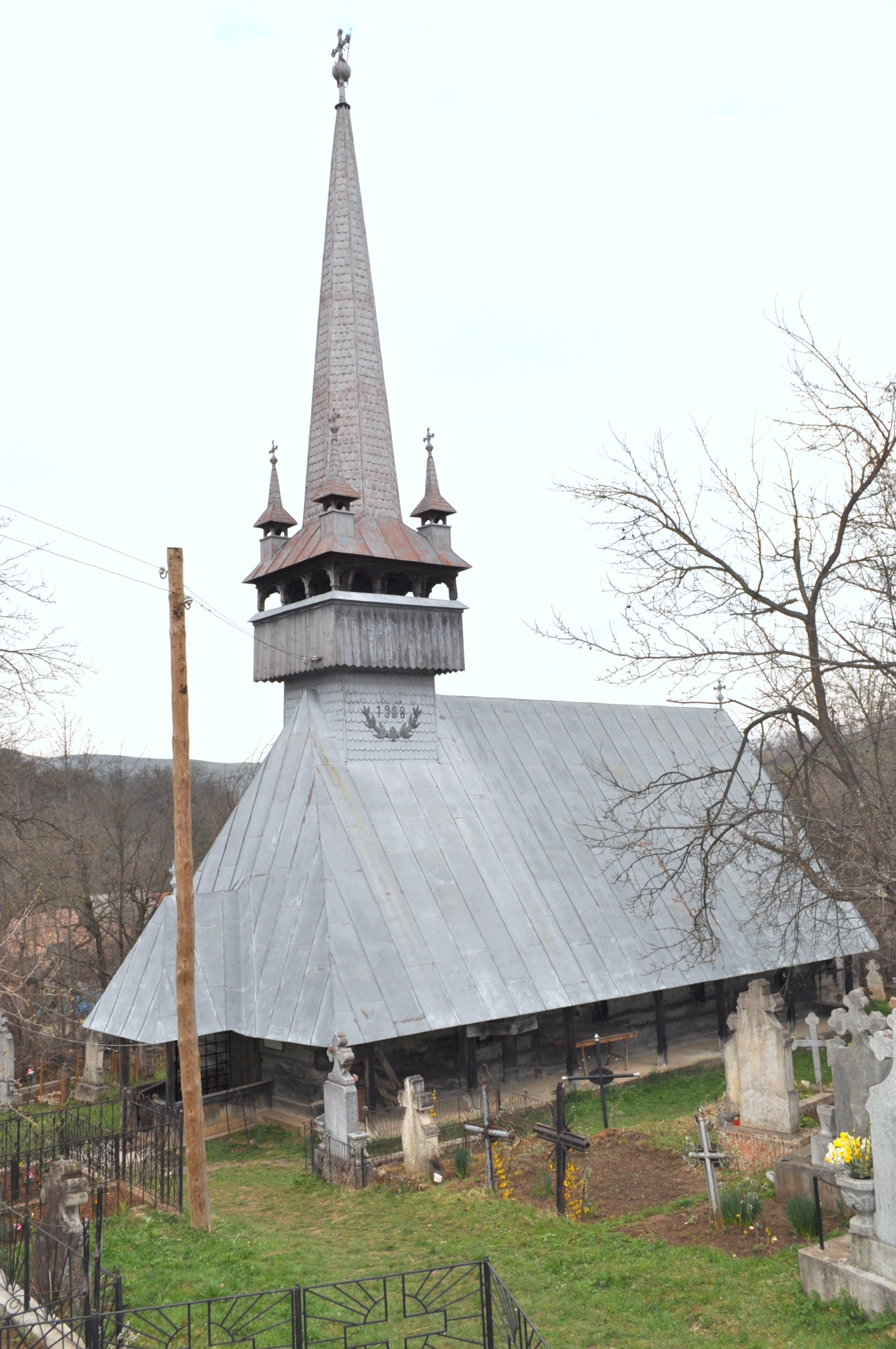
- Wooden church in Nadășu

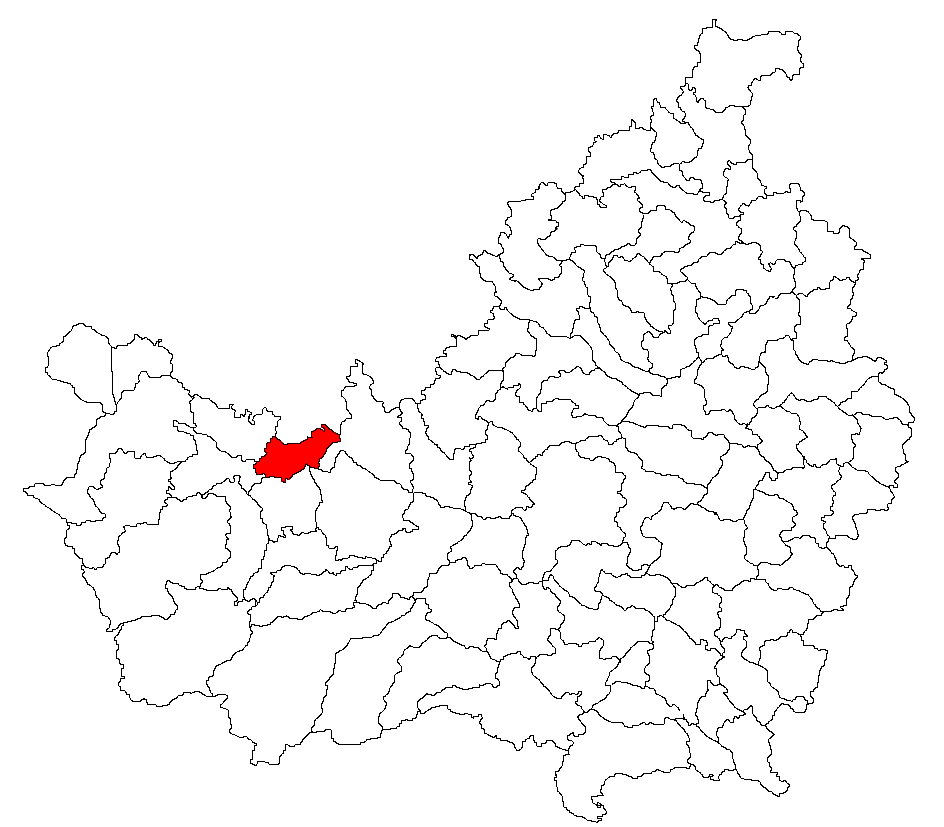
- Location in Cluj County

- Location in Romania
- Coordinates: 46°50′10″N 23°06′32″E
- Country: Romania
- County: Cluj
- Established: 1276
- Subdivisions: Izvoru Crișului, Nadășu, Nearșova, Șaula

Government
  - Mayor (2020–2024): Vasile Bodis (UDMR)
- Area: 41.37 km^{2} (15.97 sq mi)
- Elevation: 623 m (2,044 ft)
- Population (2021-12-01): 1,424
  - Density: 34.42/km^{2} (89.15/sq mi)
- Time zone: UTC+02:00 (EET)
  - Summer (DST): UTC+03:00 (EEST)
- Postal code: 407340
- Area code: +40 x64
- Vehicle reg.: CJ
- Website: www.primariaizvorucrisului.ro

Izvoru Crișului (Romanian: Izvoru Crișului; Hungarian: Körösfő, German: Krieschwej); is a commune in Cluj County, Transylvania, Romania. It is composed of four villages: Izvoru Crișului, Nadășu (Kalotanádas), Nearșova (Nyárszó), and Șaula (Sárvásár).

The commune is located in the northern part of the county, on the border with Sălaj County. It lies on the banks of the river Crișul Repede, near its source in the Gilău Mountains, whence its name, which means in Romanian, "the source of the Criș".

== Demographics ==
At the 2011 census, the commune had a population of 1,616, of which 79.0% were Hungarians and 19.9% Romanians. At the 2021 census, Izvoru Crișului had a population of 1,424, of which 79.56% were Hungarians and 15.66% Romanians.

== Images ==
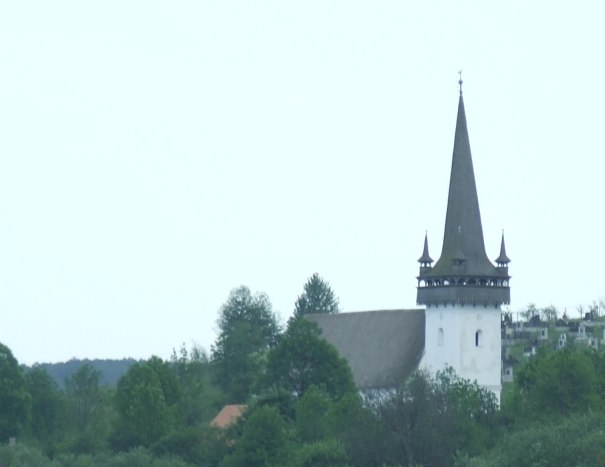
The Reformed church

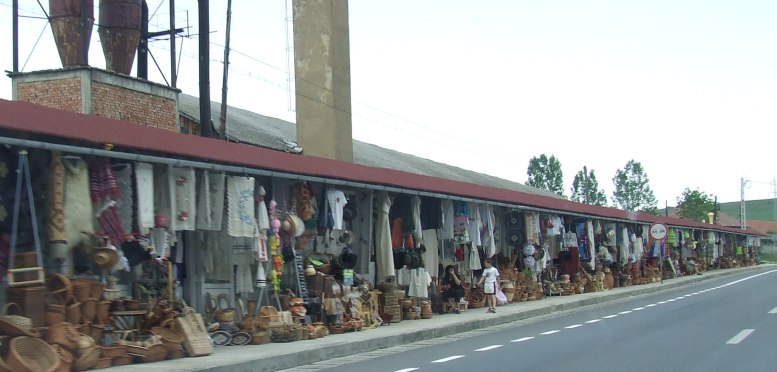
Trade in Izvoru Crișului

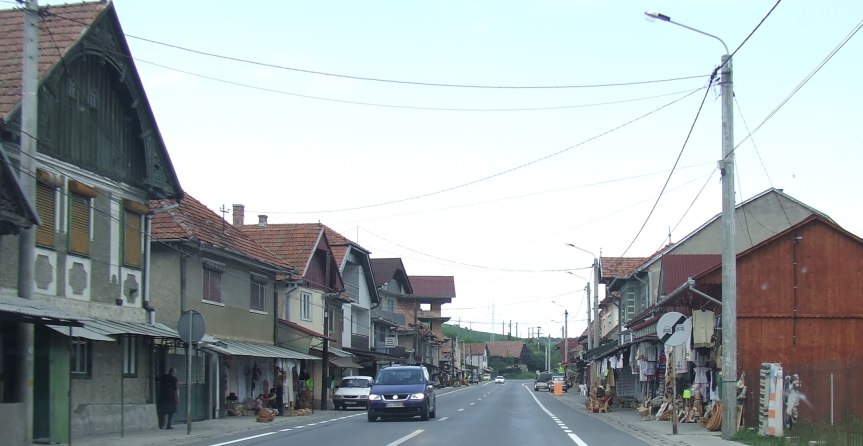
Trade in Izvoru Crișului

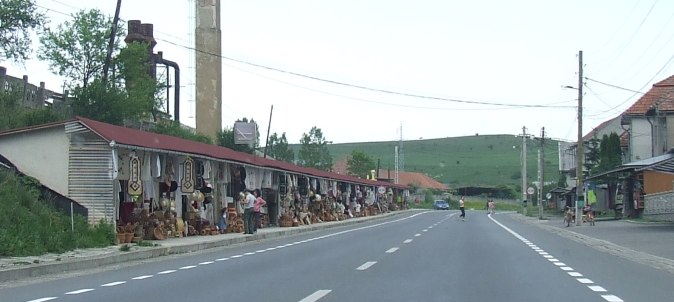
Trade in Izvoru Crișului
