= Mýtne Ludany =

Mýtne Ludany Vámosladány
- Municipality
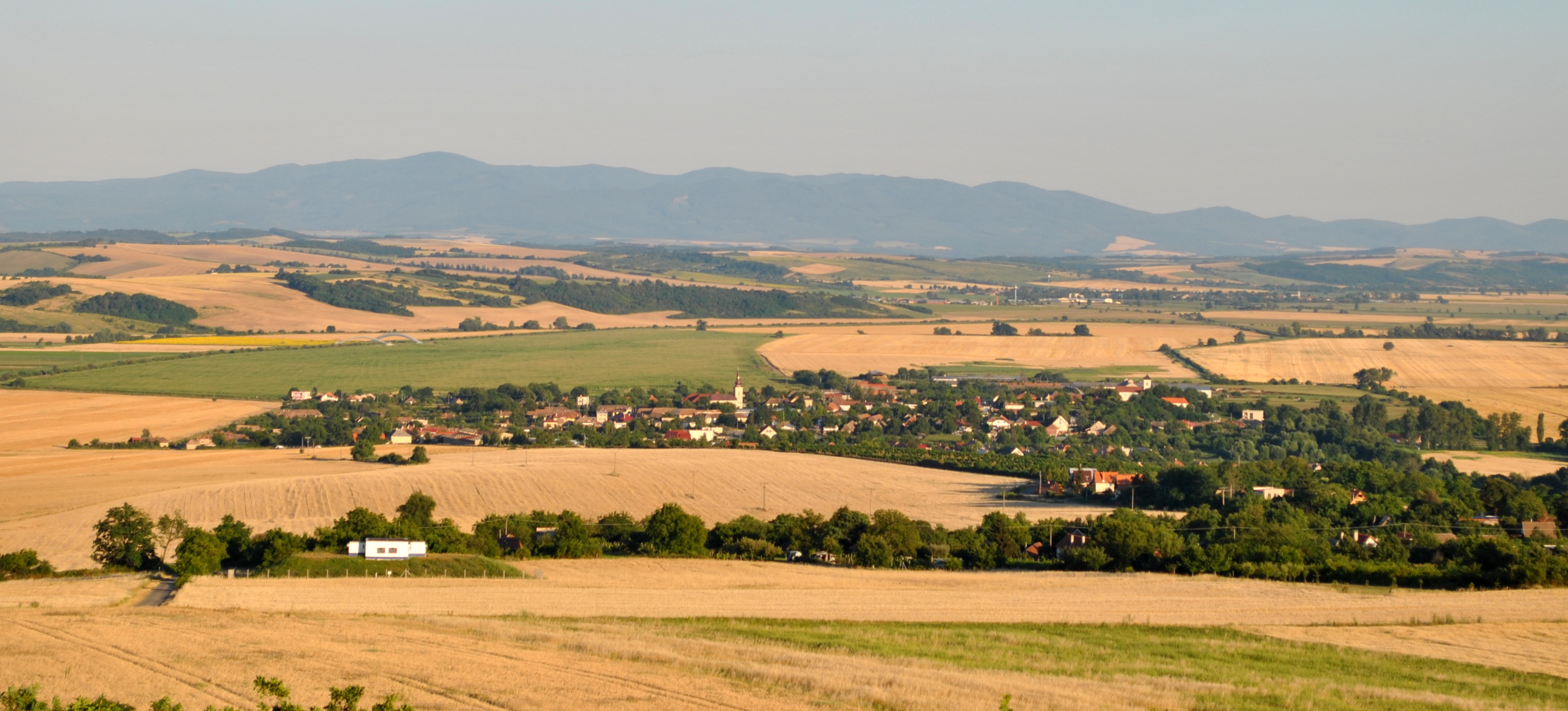

- Flag Coat of arms

- Location of Mýtne Ludany in the Nitra Region Location of Mýtne Ludany in Slovakia
- Coordinates: 48.17°N 18.67°E
- Country: Slovakia
- Region: Nitra Region
- District: Levice District
- First mentioned: 1388

Area
  - Total: 17.65 km^{2} (6.81 sq mi)
- Elevation: 152 m (499 ft)

Population (2025)
  - Total: 1,038
- Time zone: UTC+1 (CET)
  - Summer (DST): UTC+2 (CEST)
- Postal code: 935 56
- Area code: +421 36
- Vehicle registration plate (until 2022): LV
- Website: www.mytneludany.sk

Mýtne Ludany (Hungarian: Vámosladány) is a village and municipality in the Levice District in the Nitra Region of Slovakia.

== History ==
In historical records the village was first mentioned in 1375.

== Geography ==
The municipality lies at an altitude of 152 metres (499 ft) and covers an area of 17.65 km^{2} (6.81 sq mi) (2025).

== Population ==
Population statistic (10 years)
Year	1995	2005	2015	2025
Count	892	902	986	1038
Difference		+1.12%	+9.31%	+5.27%

Population statistic
Year	2024	2025
Count	1018	1038
Difference		+1.96%

It has a population of 1038 people (31 December 2025).

=== Ethnicity ===
Census 2021 (1+ %)
Ethnicity	Number	Fraction
Slovak	668	68.16%
Hungarian	269	27.44%
Not found out	84	8.57%
Total	980	

In year 2021 was 980 people by ethnicity 668 as Slovak, 269 as Hungarian, 84 as Not found out, 5 as Romani, 4 as Other, 3 as Czech, 1 as Jewish, 1 as Russian and 1 as Polish.

Note on population: The difference values of population numbers in the table "Population statistic" and in the sections "Ethnicity" & "Religion" is caused by the use of various statistical methods.

=== Religion ===
Census 2021 (1+ %)
Religion	Number	Fraction
Roman Catholic Church	419	42.76%
None	237	24.18%
Calvinist Church	166	16.94%
Not found out	77	7.86%
Evangelical Church	54	5.51%
Church of the Brethren	11	1.12%
Total	980	

In year 2021 was 980 people by religion 419 from Roman Catholic Church, 237 from None, 166 from Calvinist Church, 77 from Not found out, 54 from Evangelical Church, 11 from Church of the Brethren, 8 from Greek Catholic Church, 3 from United Methodist Church, 2 from Christian Congregations in Slovakia, 1 from Islam, 1 from Other and 1 from Ad hoc movements.

== Facilities ==
The village has a public library and football pitch.
