= Trnávka, Dunajská Streda District =

Trnávka Csallóköztárnok
- Municipality
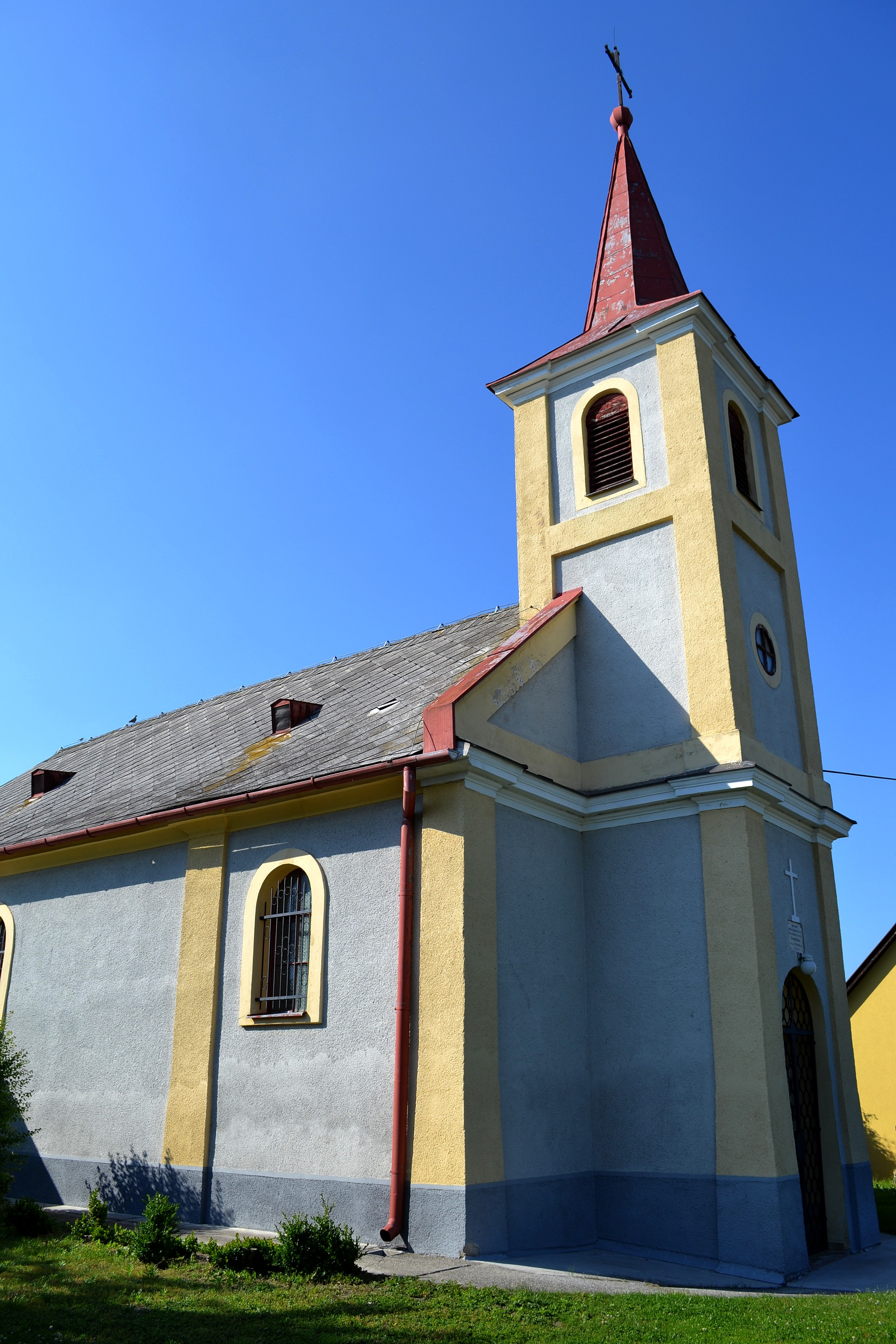

- Flag

- Location of Trnávka in the Trnava Region Location of Trnávka in Slovakia
- Coordinates: 48°00′50″N 17°24′20″E
- Country: Slovakia
- Region: Trnava Region
- District: Dunajská Streda District
- First mentioned: 1275

Area
  - Total: 7.97 km^{2} (3.08 sq mi)
- Elevation: 122 m (400 ft)

Population (2025)
  - Total: 583

Ethnicity
- Time zone: UTC+1 (CET)
  - Summer (DST): UTC+2 (CEST)
- Postal code: 930 32
- Area code: +421 31
- Vehicle registration plate (until 2022): DS
- Website: www.obectrnavka.sk

Trnávka (Hungarian: Csallóköztárnok, pronounced [ˈtʃɒlːoːkøztaːrnok]) is a village and municipality in the Dunajská Streda District in the Trnava Region of south-west Slovakia.

== Geography ==
The municipality lies at an altitude of 122 metres (400 ft) and covers an area of 7.97 km^{2} (3.08 sq mi) (2025).

== History ==
In the 9th century, the territory of Trnávka became part of the Kingdom of Hungary. The village was first recorded in 1235. Until the end of World War I, it was part of Hungary and fell within the Somorja district of Pozsony County. After the Austro-Hungarian army disintegrated in November 1918, Czechoslovak troops occupied the area. After the Treaty of Trianon of 1920, the village became officially part of Czechoslovakia. In November 1938, the First Vienna Award granted the area to Hungary and it was held by Hungary until 1945. After Soviet occupation in 1945, Czechoslovak administration returned and the village became officially part of Czechoslovakia in 1947.

== Population ==
Population statistic (10 years)
Year	1995	2005	2015	2025
Count	396	436	491	583
Difference		+10.10%	+12.61%	+18.73%

Population statistic
Year	2024	2025
Count	570	583
Difference		+2.28%

It has a population of 583 people (31 December 2025).

=== Ethnicity ===
Census 2021 (1+ %)
Ethnicity	Number	Fraction
Hungarian	345	66.09%
Slovak	182	34.86%
Not found out	21	4.02%
Total	522	

In year 2021 was 522 people by ethnicity 345 as Hungarian, 182 as Slovak, 21 as Not found out, 4 as Romanian, 3 as Other, 2 as Rusyn, 2 as German, 1 as Serbian and 1 as Austrian.

Note on population: The difference values of population numbers in the table "Population statistic" and in the sections "Ethnicity" & "Religion" is caused by the use of various statistical methods.

=== Religion ===
Census 2021 (1+ %)
Religion	Number	Fraction
Roman Catholic Church	364	69.73%
None	93	17.82%
Not found out	22	4.21%
Evangelical Church	16	3.07%
Christian Congregations in Slovakia	9	1.72%
Greek Catholic Church	7	1.34%
Total	522	

In year 2021 was 522 people by religion 364 from Roman Catholic Church, 93 from None, 22 from Not found out, 16 from Evangelical Church, 9 from Christian Congregations in Slovakia, 7 from Greek Catholic Church, 2 from Calvinist Church, 2 from Jehovah's Witnesses, 2 from United Methodist Church, 1 from Paganism and natural spirituality, 1 from New Apostolic Church, 1 from Islam, 1 from Other and 1 from Ad hoc movements.

In 1910, the village had a population of 423, mostly Hungarians. According to the 2001 census, the recorded population of the village was 428. As of 2001, 81.31% of its population was Hungarian while 16.82% was Slovak. Roman Catholicism is the majority religion of the village, its adherents numbering 82.01% of the total population.

== Twin towns – sister cities ==
Trnávka is twinned with:

- Tárnok, Hungary
