= Držkovce =

Village and municipality in Slovakia

Držkovce Deresk
- Municipality
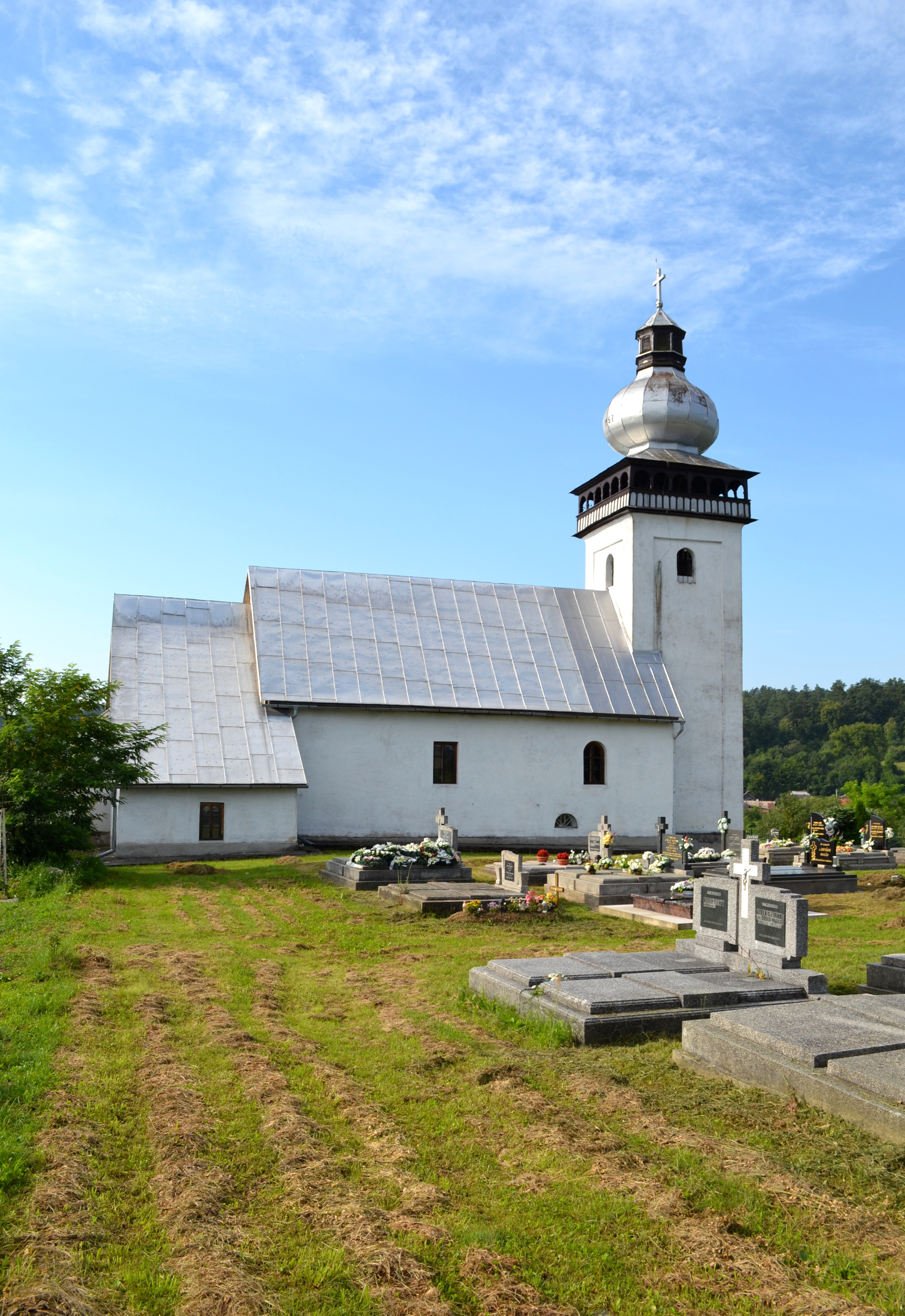

- Flag

- Location of Držkovce in the Banská Bystrica Region Location of Držkovce in Slovakia
- Coordinates: 48.55°N 20.23°E
- Country: Slovakia
- Region: Banská Bystrica Region
- District: Revúca District
- First mentioned: 1243

Area
  - Total: 20.69 km^{2} (7.99 sq mi)
- Elevation: 219 m (719 ft)

Population (2025)
  - Total: 567
- Time zone: UTC+1 (CET)
  - Summer (DST): UTC+2 (CEST)
- Postal code: 982 62
- Area code: +421 47
- Vehicle registration plate (until 2022): RA
- Website: www.obecdrzkovce.sk

Držkovce (Hungarian: Deresk) is a village and municipality in Revúca District in the Banská Bystrica Region of Slovakia.

== Geography ==
The municipality lies at an altitude of 219 metres (719 ft) and covers an area of 20.69 km^{2} (7.99 sq mi) (2025).

== History ==
In historical records, the village was first mentioned in 1243 as a royal dominion (1243 Durusk, 1318 Dursk, Dersk, Deresk, 1565 Drskowecz). In 1318, it belonged to feudatories Bebek. In 1551, it had to pay tributes to Turks. In the 18th century, it passed to Csáky and in the 19th century to Coburg. From 1938 to 1945, it belonged to Hungary.

== Genealogical resources ==
The records for genealogical research are available at the state archive "Statny Archiv in Banska Bystrica, Slovakia"

- Roman Catholic church records (births/marriages/deaths): 1756-1896 (parish A)

== Population ==
Population statistic (10 years)
Year	1995	2005	2015	2025
Count	461	522	567	567
Difference		+13.23%	+8.62%	+0%

Population statistic
Year	2024	2025
Count	569	567
Difference		−0.35%

It has a population of 567 people (31 December 2025).

=== Ethnicity ===
Census 2021 (1+ %)
Ethnicity	Number	Fraction
Hungarian	404	68.35%
Romani	157	26.56%
Slovak	155	26.22%
Not found out	52	8.79%
Total	591	

In year 2021 was 591 people by ethnicity 404 as Hungarian, 157 as Romani, 155 as Slovak, 52 as Not found out and 2 as Czech.

Note on population: The difference values of population numbers in the table "Population statistic" and in the sections "Ethnicity" & "Religion" is caused by the use of various statistical methods.

=== Religion ===
Census 2021 (1+ %)
Religion	Number	Fraction
Roman Catholic Church	463	78.34%
None	72	12.18%
Not found out	26	4.4%
Jehovah's Witnesses	7	1.18%
Greek Catholic Church	7	1.18%
Calvinist Church	6	1.02%
Total	591	

In year 2021 was 591 people by religion 463 from Roman Catholic Church, 72 from None, 26 from Not found out, 7 from Jehovah's Witnesses, 7 from Greek Catholic Church, 6 from Calvinist Church, 5 from Evangelical Church, 4 from United Methodist Church and 1 from Other.

== See also ==
- List of municipalities and towns in Slovakia
