= Nenince =

Municipality of Slovakia

Nenince Lukanénye
- Municipality
- Flag

- Location of Nenince in the Banská Bystrica Region Location of Nenince in Slovakia
- Coordinates: 48.15°N 19.27°E
- Country: Slovakia
- Region: Banská Bystrica Region
- District: Veľký Krtíš District
- First mentioned: 1135

Area
  - Total: 13.45 km^{2} (5.19 sq mi)
- Elevation: 170 m (560 ft)

Population (2025)
  - Total: 1,253
- Time zone: UTC+1 (CET)
  - Summer (DST): UTC+2 (CEST)
- Postal code: 991 26
- Area code: +421 47
- Vehicle registration plate (until 2022): VK
- Website: www.nenince.sk/sk/

Nenince (Hungarian: Lukanénye) is a village and municipality in the Veľký Krtíš District of the Banská Bystrica Region of southern Slovakia.

== Geography ==
The municipality lies at an altitude of 170 metres (560 ft) and covers an area of 13.45 km^{2} (5.19 sq mi) (2025).

== Population ==
Population statistic (10 years)
Year	1995	2005	2015	2025
Count	1396	1383	1346	1253
Difference		−0.93%	−2.67%	−6.90%

Population statistic
Year	2024	2025
Count	1261	1253
Difference		−0.63%

It has a population of 1253 people (31 December 2025).

=== Ethnicity ===
Census 2021 (1+ %)
Ethnicity	Number	Fraction
Hungarian	776	58.87%
Slovak	628	47.64%
Not found out	28	2.12%
Total	1318	

In year 2021 was 1318 people by ethnicity 776 as Hungarian, 628 as Slovak, 28 as Not found out, 2 as Other, 1 as Czech, 1 as Ukrainian, 1 as Serbian, 1 as Rusyn, 1 as Russian and 1 as German.

Note on population: The difference values of population numbers in the table "Population statistic" and in the sections "Ethnicity" & "Religion" is caused by the use of various statistical methods.

=== Religion ===
Census 2021 (1+ %)
Religion	Number	Fraction
Roman Catholic Church	1194	90.59%
None	63	4.78%
Evangelical Church	22	1.67%
Not found out	17	1.29%
Total	1318	

In year 2021 was 1318 people by religion 1194 from Roman Catholic Church, 63 from None, 22 from Evangelical Church, 17 from Not found out, 6 from Greek Catholic Church, 5 from Calvinist Church, 5 from Christian Congregations in Slovakia, 2 from Jehovah's Witnesses, 1 from Eastern Orthodox Church, 1 from Other and not ascertained christian church, 1 from Other and 1 from Ad hoc movements.
