= Dány =

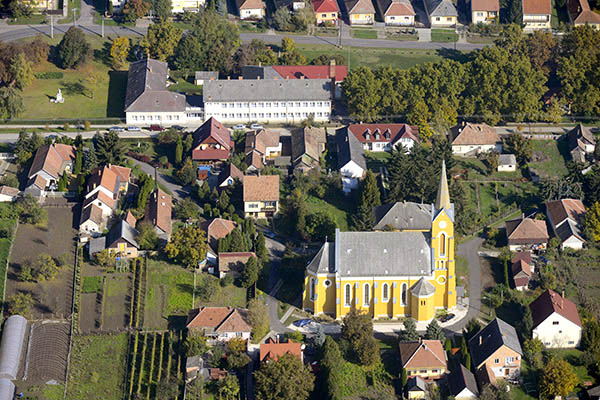

- Flag Coat of arms

- Location of Dány in Hungary
- Coordinates: 47.51932°N 19.54519°E
- Country: Hungary
- Region: Central Hungary
- County: Pest
- Subregion: Gödöllői
- Rank: Village

Government
  - Mayor: Gódor András

Area
  - Total: 43.01 km^{2} (16.61 sq mi)

Population (1 January 2008)
  - Total: 4,302
  - Density: 100.0/km^{2} (259.1/sq mi)
- Time zone: UTC+1 (CET)
  - Summer (DST): UTC+2 (CEST)
- Postal code: 2118
- Area code: +36 28
- KSH code: 18397
- Website: www.dany.hu

Dány is a village in Pest county, Hungary.
