= List of districts in Budapest =

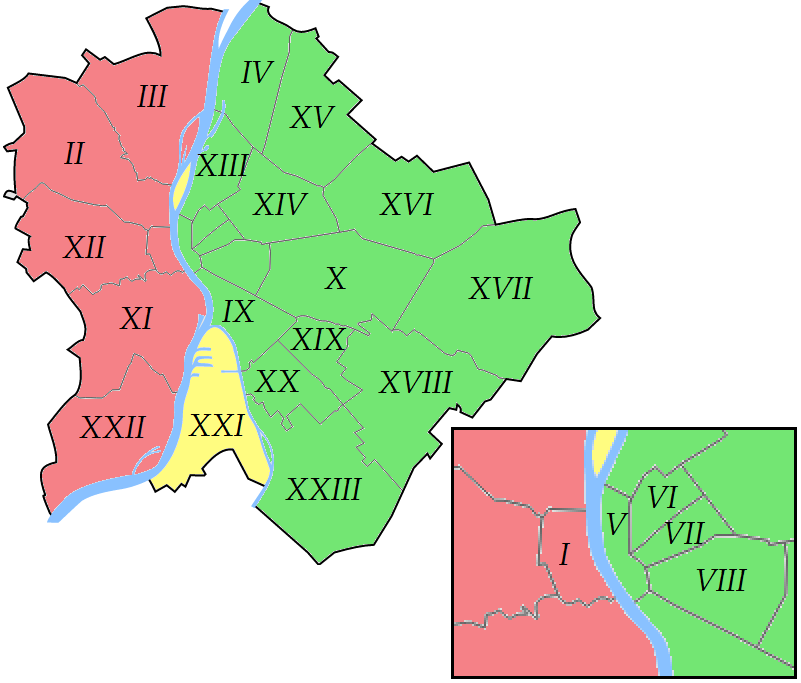
A map of Budapest with the 23 numbered districts. The red areas comprise Buda; the green, Pest. Major islands (Margaret Island and Csepel) are in yellow.

Budapest, the capital of Hungary, is administratively divided into 23 districts (Hungarian: kerület, pronounced [ˈkɛrylɛt]), each with its own municipal government.

== The number of districts in Budapest ==
Budapest was organized into 10 districts (numbered from I to X) in 1873 after the unification of the cities of Pest, Buda and Óbuda. The districts at that time:

- Buda: I, II
- Óbuda: III
- Pest: IV, V, VI, VII, VIII, IX, X

In the 1930s, 4 new districts were organized, numbered from XI to XIV. On 1 January 1950, 7 neighboring towns and 16 villages were annexed to Budapest by creating 9 new districts, so the number of its districts increased to 22. District IV was annexed to District V and the number IV was given to the northernmost newly merged town, Újpest. Former district borders were also partly modified but the old numbering system is still clear on the map. In 1994, Soroksár left District XX, became the newest district and received the number XXIII.

== Districts ==
Listed below are the ordinal numbers of the 23 districts of Budapest, their official names (if there is one), and the names of the neighbourhoods within the districts. Each district can be associated with one or more neighbourhoods named after former towns within Budapest.

- Buda is the hilly part on the west bank of the Danube (red cells in the table below), Districts I, II, III, XI, XII, XXII
- Pest is the flat part on the east bank of the Danube (green cells in the table below). Districts IV, V, VI, VII, VIII, IX, X, XIII, XIV, XV, XVI, XVII, XVIII, XIX, XX, XXIII
- Csepel is a big island in the south which barely belongs to Budapest. This part of the island is the District XXI and is also referred as Csepel.
- Margaret Island is an island that is directly administered by the Municipality of Budapest (used to be part of District XIII) and is used as a recreational area
- There is a third island called Óbuda Island (Óbudai-sziget) which forms parts of District III and hosts the Sziget Festival since 1993.

District number	District name	Neighborhoods	Sights
I.	Várkerület	Buda Castle, Tabán, Gellérthegy, Krisztinaváros, southern Víziváros	Buda Castle, Matthias Church, Hungarian National Gallery, Castle Hill Funicular, Sándor Palace, Fisherman's Bastion, Gellért Hill, Labyrinth of Buda Castle
II.	2nd District of Budapest	Adyliget, Budakeszierdő, Budaliget, Csatárka, Erzsébetliget, Erzsébettelek, Felhévíz, Gercse, Hársakalja, Hárshegy, Hűvösvölgy, Kővár, Kurucles, Lipótmező, Máriaremete, Nyék, Országút, Pálvölgy, Pasarét, Pesthidegkút-Ófalu, Petneházy-rét, Remetekertváros, Rézmál, Rózsadomb, Szemlőhegy, Széphalom, Szépilona, Szépvölgy, Törökvész, Újlak, Vérhalom, northern Víziváros, Zöldmál.	Tomb of Gül Baba, Mechwart Park, Cave of Szemlő Hill, Stalactite Cave of Pál Valley, Lukács Bath
III.	Óbuda-Békásmegyer	Óbuda, Aquincum, Aranyhegy, Békásmegyer, Csillaghegy, Csúcshegy, Filatorigát, Hármashatár-hegy, Kaszásdűlő, Mátyáshegy, Mocsárosdűlő, Óbudai-sziget, Remetehegy, Rómaifürdő, Solymárvölgy, Szépvölgy, Táborhegy, Testvérhegy, Törökkő, Ürömhegy, Újlak.	Ruins of Aquincum, Aquincum Military Amphitheatre, Római Part (Roman Beach), Zichy Castle
IV.	Újpest	Újpest, Megyer, Káposztásmegyer, Székesdűlő, Istvántelek.	Queen of Heavens Church, Synagogue of Újpest, Water Tower of Újpest
V.	Belváros-Lipótváros	Inner City, Lipótváros	Parliament, Hungarian Academy of Sciences, Gresham Palace, St. Stephen's Basilica, Vigadó Concert Hall, Ethnographic Museum, Hungarian National Bank, Károlyi Garden, ELTE Faculty of Law
VI.	Terézváros	Terézváros	Andrássy Avenue, Hungarian State Opera House, House of Terror Museum, St. Theresa of Ávila Church.
VII.	Erzsébetváros	Erzsébetváros	Dohány Street Synagogue, Rumbach Street Synagogue, Kazinczy Street Synagogue, St. Elizabeth of Árpád House Church, Reformed Church of Fasor, Madách Theatre, Gozsdu udvar, Hungária Bath (today: Continental Hotel Zara), New York Palace (today: Boscolo Budapest Hotel)
VIII.	Józsefváros	Józsefváros, Kerepesdűlő, Tisztviselőtelep	Hungarian National Museum, Erkel Theatre, Orczy Garden, Botanic Garden, Hungarian Natural History Museum, Kerepesi Cemetery, ELTE Faculty of Humanities
IX.	Ferencváros	Ferencváros, Gubacsidűlő, József Attila-lakótelep	National Theatre, Palace of Arts, Kálvin Square Reformed Church, Assisi St. Francis Church, Zwack Unicum Museum, Ráday Street, Holocaust Memorial Center, Museum of Applied Arts, Corvinus University
X.	Kőbánya	Felsőrákos, Gyárdűlő, Keresztúridűlő, Kőbánya-Kertváros	Népliget (People's Park), Planetarium, St. László Church, Csősztorony (Keeper Tower)
XI.	Újbuda	Albertfalva, Dobogó, Gazdagrét, Gellérthegy, Hosszúrét, Kamaraerdő, Kelenföld, Kelenvölgy, Kőérberek, Lágymányos, Madárhegy, Őrmező, Örsöd, Péterhegy, Pösingermajor, Sasad, Sashegy, Spanyolrét, Tabán	Gellért Hill, Citadella, Liberty Statue, Budapest University of Technology and Economics St. Gellért Church, Kopaszi Dike, ELTE Faculty of Science
XII.	Hegyvidék	Budakeszierdő, Csillebérc, Farkasrét, Farkasvölgy, Istenhegy, Jánoshegy, Kissvábhegy, Krisztinaváros, Kútvölgy, Magasút, Mártonhegy, Németvölgy, Orbánhegy, Sashegy, Svábhegy, Széchenyihegy, Virányos, Zugliget.	Elizabeth Lookout Tower, Normafa
XIII.	13th District of Budapest	Újlipótváros, Angyalföld, Vizafogó, Népsziget, Göncz Árpád városközpont	Comedy Theatre, St. Margaret of Árpád House Church, Our Lady of Mount Carmel Church
XIV.	Zugló	Alsórákos, Herminamező, Istvánmező, Kiszugló, Nagyzugló, Rákosfalva, Törökőr, City Park	City Park, Heroes' Square, Zoo, Széchenyi Medicinal Bath, Gundel Restaurant, Vajdahunyad Castle, Petőfi Hall, Museum of Fine Arts, Hall of Art, Transport Museum, Municipal Grand Circus, Petőfi Hall, Ferenc Puskás Stadium
XV.	15th District of Budapest	Rákospalota, Pestújhely, Újpalota	Water Tower
XVI.	16th district of Budapest	Mátyásföld, Sashalom, Cinkota, Rákosszentmihály, Árpádföld, Kisszentmihály, Ilonatelep, Petőfikert, Nagyiccetelep, Szentgyörgytelep, Szabadságtelep, Huszkatelep	Mátyásföld Airport,
XVII.	Rákosmente	Rákoskeresztúr, Rákoscsaba, Rákoscsaba-Újtelep, Rákosliget, Rákoshegy, Rákoskert, Akadémiaújtelep, Madárdomb, Régiakadémiatelep	Statue of Heroes, Statue of Pope John Paul II, Rákos Stream, Merzse Marsh
XVIII.	Pestszentlőrinc-Pestszentimre	Pestszentlőrinc, Pestszentimre	Ferenc Liszt Airport, Sándor Petőfi Statue
XIX. kerület	Kispest	Kispest, Wekerletelep	Our Lady Church of Kispest
XX.	Pesterzsébet	Gubacsipuszta, Kossuthfalva, Pacsirtatelep, Pesterzsébet, Pesterzsébet-Szabótelep	St. Elizabeth of Árpád House Church, Statue of Lajos Kossuth
XXI.	Csepel	Csepel	Little Our Lady Church, Tamariska Hill
XXII.	Budafok-Tétény	Budatétény, Nagytétény, Budafok	Czuba-Durozier Castle, Nagytétény Castle, Sacelláry Castle, Törley Castle, Törley Mausoleum, Memento Park
XXIII.	Soroksár	Soroksár	Heroes' Statue, Molnár Island
non-district	Margit-sziget	Margit-sziget	Dominican Monastery ruins, Franciscan Monastery ruins, Premonstratensian Convent, Water Tower, Japanese Garden, Alfréd Hajós National Swimming Stadium, Palatinus Swimming Pool, Musical Fountain

== List of districts by population, territory and population density ==
District	Name	Population (2016)	Area (km^{2})	Population density (people per km^{2})
I. kerület	Várkerület	25,196	3.41	7388.8
II. kerület	-	89,903	36.34	2473.9
III. kerület	Óbuda-Békásmegyer	130,415	39.70	3285.0
IV. kerület	Újpest	101,558	18.82	5396.2
V. kerület	Belváros-Lipótváros	26,284	2.59	10,148.2
VI. kerület	Terézváros	38,504	2.38	16,178.1
VII. kerület	Erzsébetváros	53,381	2.09	25,541.1
VIII. kerület	Józsefváros	76,811	6.85	11,213.2
IX. kerület	Ferencváros	59,056	12.53	4713.1
X. kerület	Kőbánya	78,414	32.49	2413.4
XI. kerület	Újbuda	151,812	33.49	4533.0
XII. kerület	Hegyvidék	58,171	26.67	2181.1
XIII. kerület	Angyalföld-Újlipótváros-Vizafogó	120,256	13.43	8954.2
XIV. kerület	Zugló	124,841	18.13	6885.8
XV. kerület	Rákospalota-Pestújhely-Újpalota	80,573	26.94	2990.8
XVI. kerület	-	73,486	33.51	2192.9
XVII. kerület	Rákosmente	87,793	54.82	1601.4
XVIII. kerület	Pestszentlőrinc-Pestszentimre	101,738	38.60	2635.6
XIX. kerület	Kispest	60,731	9.38	6474.5
XX. kerület	Pesterzsébet	65,321	12.19	5385.5
XXI. kerület	Csepel	76,911	25.75	2985.8
XXII. kerület	Budafok-Tétény	54,611	34.25	1594.4
XXIII. kerület	Soroksár	23,641	40.77	579.8
All	Budapest	1,759,407	525.13	3350.4

== Arrangement of districts ==
District I is a small area in central Buda (the western side), including the historic Castle. District II is in Buda again, in the northwest, and District III stretches along in the northernmost part of Buda.

To reach District IV, one must cross the Danube to find it in Pest (the eastern side), also at north. With District V, another circle begins: it is located in the absolute centre of Pest. Districts VI, VII, VIII and IX are the neighbouring areas to the east, going southwards, one after the other.

District X is another, more external circle also in Pest, while one must jump to the Buda side again to find Districts XI and XII, going northwards. No more districts remaining in Buda in this circle, we must turn our steps to Pest again to find Districts XIII, XIV, XV, XVI, XVII, XVIII, XIX and XX (mostly external city parts), almost regularly in a semicircle, going southwards again.

District XXI is the extension of the above route over a branch of the Danube, the northern tip of a long island (Csepel-sziget) south from Budapest. District XXII is still on the same route in southwest Buda, and finally District XXIII is again in southernmost Pest, irregular only because it was part of District XX until the mid-90s.

== Twin towns and sister cities (districts) ==
Budapest I – Budavár

- Capestrano, Italy
- Carouge, Switzerland
- Innere Stadt (Vienna), Austria
- Lendava, Slovenia
- Marlow, England, United Kingdom
- Mukachevo, Ukraine
- Odorheiu Secuiesc, Romania
- Old Town (Bratislava), Slovakia
- Prague 1 (Prague), Czech Republic
- Regensburg, Germany
- Savonlinna, Finland
- Senta, Serbia
- Śródmieście (Warsaw), Poland

Budapest II

- Beşiktaş, Turkey
- Finike, Turkey
- Mosbach, Germany
- Żoliborz (Warsaw), Poland

Budapest III – Óbuda-Békásmegyer

- Bemowo (Warsaw), Poland
- Billigheim, Germany
- Büyükçekmece, Turkey
- Miercurea Ciuc, Romania
- Old Town (Košice), Slovakia
- Stirling, Scotland, United Kingdom

Budapest V – Belváros-Lipótváros

- Bačka Topola, Serbia
- Charlottenburg-Wilmersdorf (Berlin), Germany
- Gheorgheni, Romania
- Inlăceni (Atid), Romania
- Mondragone, Italy
- Old Town (Kraków), Poland
- Rakhiv, Ukraine
- Rimetea, Romania
- Rožňava, Slovakia

Budapest VI – Terézváros

- Târgu Secuiesc, Romania
- Temerin, Serbia
- Zadar, Croatia

Budapest VII – Erzsébetváros

- Karlovac, Croatia
- Nevers, France
- Požega, Croatia
- Safed, Israel
- Stari Grad (Belgrade), Serbia
- Stavroupoli, Greece
- Sveti Vlas (Nesebar), Bulgaria

Budapest VIII – Józsefváros

- Pescina, Italy

Budapest IX – Ferencváros

- Berehove, Ukraine
- Kanjiža, Serbia
- Kráľovský Chlmec, Slovakia
- Sfântu Gheorghe, Romania

Budapest X – Kőbánya

- Bălan, Romania
- Jarosław, Poland
- Letovice, Czech Republic
- Litochoro, Greece
- Štúrovo, Slovakia
- Vinkovci, Croatia
- Wolverhampton, England, United Kingdom

Budapest XI – Újbuda

- Ada, Serbia
- Bad Cannstatt (Stuttgart), Germany
- Bahçelievler, Turkey
- Bene, Ukraine
- Berehove Raion, Ukraine
- District 1 (Ho Chi Minh City), Vietnam
- Prague 5 (Prague), Czech Republic
- Ruse, Bulgaria
- Sânzieni, Romania
- Târgu Mureș, Romania
- Trogir, Croatia
- Trstice, Slovakia
- Ustroń, Poland
- Yiwu, China
- Żoliborz (Warsaw), Poland

Budapest XII – Hegyvidék

- Arad, Romania

Budapest XIII

- Floridsdorf (Vienna), Austria
- Košice-Juh (Košice), Slovakia
- Ochota (Warsaw), Poland
- Osijek, Croatia
- Sovata, Romania

Budapest XIV – Zugló

- Ciceu, Romania
- Opava, Czech Republic
- Racibórz, Poland
- Racoş, Romania
- Steglitz-Zehlendorf (Berlin), Germany

Budapest XV

- Dabas, Hungary
- Donji Kraljevec, Croatia
- Liesing (Vienna), Austria
- Linyi, China
- Marzahn-Hellersdorf (Berlin), Germany
- Nad jazerom (Košice), Slovakia
- Obervellach, Austria
- Sanming, China
- Topliţa, Romania

Budapest XVI

- Tây Hồ District (Hanoi), Vietnam

Budapest XVII – Rákosmente

- Gheorgheni, Romania
- Krosno County, Poland
- Lovran, Croatia

Budapest XVIII – Pestszentlőrinc-Pestszentimre

- Artashat, Armenia
- Băile Tușnad, Romania
- Dąbrowa County, Poland
- Izvoru Crișului, Romania
- Moldava nad Bodvou, Slovakia
- Nesebar, Bulgaria
- Nin, Croatia
- Odorheiu Secuiesc, Romania
- Roding, Germany
- San Nicola la Strada, Italy
- Tiachiv, Ukraine

Budapest XIX – Kispest

- Krzeszowice, Poland
- Pendik, Turkey
- Smolyan, Bulgaria
- Sombor, Serbia
- Tășnad, Romania
- Vrbovec, Croatia

Budapest XX – Pesterzsébet

- Alushta, Ukraine
- Belin, Romania
- Cristuru Secuiesc, Romania
- Nowa Słupia, Poland
- Olgiate Comasco, Italy
- Nord-Ost (Frankfurt), Germany

Budapest XXI – Csepel

- Băile Tușnad, Romania
- Gănești, Romania
- Kielce, Poland
- Rijeka, Croatia
- Salonta, Romania
- Wołomin, Poland

Budapest XXII – Budafok-Tétény

- Baraolt, Romania
- Białołęka (Warsaw), Poland
- Bonn (Bonn), Germany
- Koson, Ukraine
- Kristianstad, Sweden
- Primorski District (Varna), Bulgaria

Budapest XXIII – Soroksár

- Nürtingen, Germany
- Odorheiu Secuiesc, Romania
- Sędziszów Małopolski, Poland
- Tongzhou (Beijing), China
- Törökbálint, Hungary
- Tvarditsa, Bulgaria
