= Mecca (company) =

Australian beauty retailer

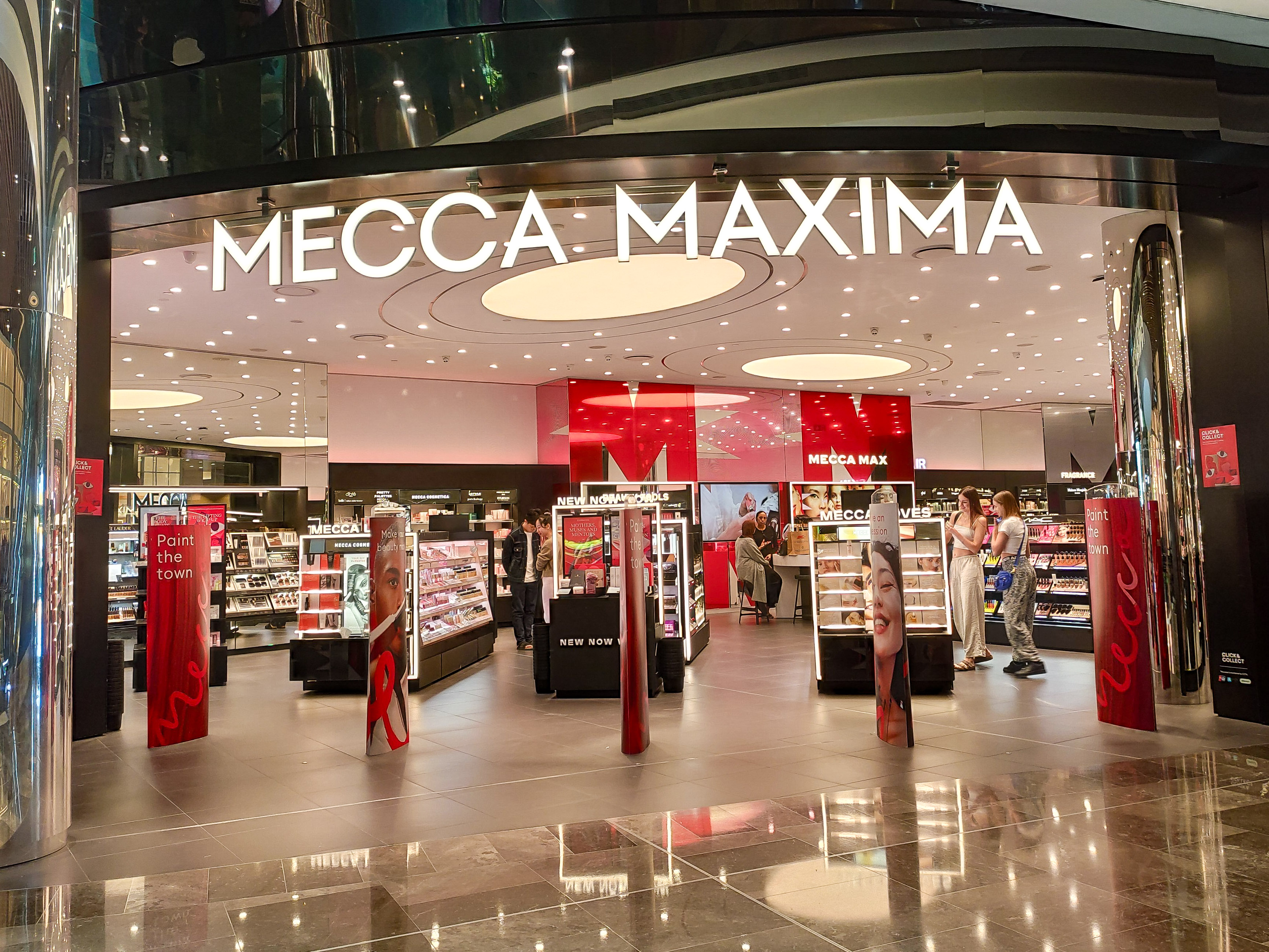
- Mecca Maxima store in Westfield Carousel
- Type: Private
- Industry: Retail
- Founded: 1997; 29 years ago in South Yarra, Australia
- Founder: Jo Horgan
- Headquarters: Richmond, Victoria
- Number of locations: 110+ (2025)
- Area served: Australia; New Zealand; United Kingdom
- Key people: Jo Horgan (co-CEO); Peter Wetenhall (co-CEO)
- Number of employees: 8000+ (2025)
- Website: mecca.com

Mecca is an Australian beauty retailer. The company was founded by Jo Horgan in 1997. There are over 110 Mecca stores across Australia and New Zealand, in addition to an online store. Mecca employs more than 8000 people, with products from 200-plus brands.

== History ==
Mecca was founded in 1997 when Jo Horgan, then 29 years old, used the funds from the sale of her house to open the company's first store in the Melbourne suburb of South Yarra. The company launched with seven brands unavailable in Australia including NARS, Stila and Vincent Longo. In its first four years, the business lost money.

Mecca launched its online store in 2001. Horgan's husband Peter Wetenhall joined her as co-CEO in 2005. The first Mecca store in New Zealand opened in 2007.

In 2017, Mecca discontinued its Kit beauty product brand and closed its related stores. The same year the company launched its Mecca Max brand. In 2018, the company held its first Meccaland, a three-day beauty festival.

In late 2019, the company faced allegations of discrimination, bullying and favouritism from some former and then-current employees. The company pledged to make changes, including establishing a complaints hotline and appointing an external culture specialist.

The onset of the COVID-19 pandemic led Mecca to temporarily close all its stores for part of 2020 and shift its business focus to online. In August 2020, Mecca began selling into China through the ecommerce platform Tmall Global, although it pulled out in November 2023.

In July 2021, the company launched a podcast called Mecca Talks. In August 2022, Mecca relaunched its Kit brand as a gender-neutral, plant-based skincare range.

In 2023, an independent review commissioned by the company found that 1600 current and former employees had been underpaid between July 2016 and July 2022 and were owed a combined total of about $560,000. The company paid back the employees.

In June 2023, Mecca expanded to the UK by selling its best-selling product, the To Save Face SPF50+ Superscreen, on its UK website.

In August 2025, Mecca opened its new Melbourne flagship store on Bourke Street. Spanning 4,000 m^{2} (43,000 sq ft) over three levels, it is the biggest beauty store in the world. Mecca launched its first Mecca Apothecary concept as part of the store. The space incorporates services such as consultations with naturopaths from health collective Melbourne Apothecary, ear seeds, and products ranging from teas to tongue scrapers.

In January 2026, Mecca announced it would close its Myer concession stores by September 2026. In March, three companies associated with Mecca were fined a total of $594,000 fine by ASIC for failing to lodge audited financial reports for 2024 on time.

== Operations ==
Jo Horgan leads the business with her husband Peter Wetenhall who is co-owner and co-chief executive. The company's headquarters and support centre is located in Richmond. Horgan was named Melburnian of the Year in the 2025 Melbourne Awards.

There are over 110 Mecca stores across Australia and New Zealand. Mecca has three types of stores: Mecca Cosmetica, the original prestige boutique concept; Mecca Maxima, aimed at younger consumers; and Mecca, which combines both concepts. Additionally, Mecca has concessions in seven Myer department stores, as of 2023. Some Mecca stores also offer services such as ear piercing, facials, injectables, brow shaping and blow dries.

The company stocks products from over 200 brands, a majority of which (around 80% in 2025) are exclusive to the company in Australia. Mecca manages sales, marketing and distribution for the brands. Mecca's private label brands are Mecca Cosmetica, Mecca Max, Kit and Mecca-ssentials.

The company has over 8000 employees, of which 95% are female. Staff receive 200 hours of training in their first year. Meccaversity—the company's beauty education portal—was developed and launched for employees in May 2020 and later opened up to customers. Mecca's loyalty program is called Beauty Loop. It has 2.9 million members, as of 2025.
