= Danny Pierce =

Danny Pierce may refer to:

- Danny Pierce (American football)
- Danny Pierce (artist)

== See also ==
- Daniel M. Pierce, American lawyer and politician from Illinois
