= Edmond Casarella =

American painter and sculptor

Casarella's Detroit (1961)

Edmond Casarella (September 3, 1920 – February 13, 1996) was an American printmaker, painter, and sculptor based in the New York metropolitan area. He developed the innovative use of a layered cardboard printing matrix that could be carved like a woodcut, enabling the inexpensive creation of large-scale works.

== Early life ==
Casarella was born in Newark, New Jersey, on September 3, 1920, to an ethnic Italian family. His family moved to Brooklyn, where he attended local schools. He graduated from Cooper Union College in 1942. He became a mentor to Vincent Longo, a younger boy in the neighborhood who was interested in art and followed Casarella to Cooper Union. Longo also became an artist, and has worked chiefly as a painter since the late 20th century.

== Career ==
Casarella was hired by printmaker Anthony Velonis, who during the 1930s had led the Federal Arts Project in New York and expanded silk-screen printing as a fine art process. Velonis was commissioned to write a pamphlet on this technique, Technical Problems of the Artist: Technique of the Silk Screen Process (1938), which was distributed to WPA art centers across the country. It was very influential in encouraging artists to try this process. The New Deal program created employment opportunities for artists.

In the 1940s, Velonis continued to lead Creative Printmakers Group in New York, which he had co-founded in 1939. Casarella printed serigraphs at this studio. The following year Casarella created the poster for the 1943 exhibition, Artists for Victory.

Casarella joined the U.S. Army in 1944 and fought in Europe during World War II. After his discharge, he studied under the GI Bill at the Brooklyn Museum School from 1949 to 1951, including printmaking with Gabor Peterdi.

Casarella made his first paper relief print in about 1948. He continued to experiment with the medium throughout his career and developed a way of layering cardboard in order to cut it like a woodcut - an inexpensive way to produce large-scale works.

His work was shown in 1949 at the Laurel Gallery in New York. In 1952 he was represented by Margaret Lowengrund's Contemporaries Gallery. In 1953, Casarella and Vincent Longo had their work shown in a joint exhibit at the Brooklyn Museum. That same year Casarella's work was included in the Young American Printmakers exhibition at the New York Museum of Modern Art. In 1962, he was included in the widely traveled exhibition, American Prints Today.

Casarella received a Fulbright Fellowship in 1951, a Tiffany Award in 1955, and a Guggenheim Foundation Grant in 1960. These awards enabled him to travel for study and work throughout Italy and Greece.

Casarella returned to the Brooklyn Museum to teach art classes from 1955 to 1960. During the 1960s, he shifted from printmaking to creating works of sculpture. He taught courses at the Art Students' League and Hunter College, with additional temporary teaching positions at the Pratt Institute, Yale University, Rutgers University and Columbia University. From 1969 to 1975, he taught at Cooper Union and Finch College in New York City.

== Works ==
Casarella was accepted as an Academician of the National Academy of Design. His prints, paintings and sculpture were included in a score of exhibitions in the United States and Eastern Europe. His work is represented in the collections of the Whitney Museum of American Art, the Brooklyn Museum, the Library of Congress, the Cleveland Museum of Art, the Worcester Art Museum, the Speed Art Museum, the Chazen Museum of Art, the Green National Museum in Athens, and the Australian National Museum in Canberra.

Casarella died on February 13, 1996, in Englewood, New Jersey.

== Sources ==
- Edmond Casarella, IFPDA biography.
- Prints With/Out Pressure: American Relief Prints from the 1940s through the 1960s, New York Public Library online exhibition
