= Budafok-Tétény =

22nd District of Budapest Budapest XXII. kerülete Budafok-Tétény
- District of Budapest
- District XXII
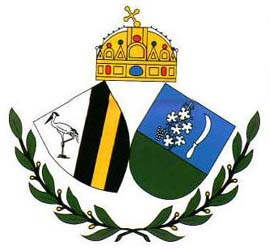
- Flag Coat of arms

- Location of District XXII in Budapest (shown in grey)
- Coordinates: 47.4250°N 19.0317°E
- Country: Hungary
- Region: Central Hungary
- City: Budapest
- Established: 1 January 1950
- Quarters: List: Baross Gábor-telep; Budafok; Budatétény; Nagytétény

Government
  - Mayor: Ferenc Karsay (Fidesz-KDNP)

Area
  - Total: 34.75 km^{2} (13.42 sq mi)
  - Rank: 6th

Population (2016)
  - Total: 54,611
  - Rank: 18th
  - Density: 1,571/km^{2} (4,070/sq mi)
- Demonym: huszonkettedik kerületi ("22nd districter")
- Time zone: UTC+1 (CET)
  - Summer (DST): UTC+2 (CEST)
- Postal code: 1221 ... 1225
- Website: budafokteteny.hu

Budafok-Tétény the 22nd district of Budapest, Hungary.

== List of mayors ==
Member	Party	Date
Ervin Hajas	SZDSZ	1990–1998
Ervin Hajas	Ind.	1990–1998
Attila Szabolcs	MDF	1998–2002
Istvánné Bollók	MSZP	2002–2006
Attila Szabolcs	Fidesz	2006–2014
Ferenc Karsay	Fidesz	2014–

== Twin towns - twin cities ==
- Bonn – Germany
- Baraolt – Romania
- Kristianstad – Sweden
- Białołęka (Warsaw) – Poland
- Bolzano – Italy
- Varna – Bulgaria
- Donaustadt (Wien) – Austria
- Ixelles – Belgium
- Koprivnica-Križevci County – Croatia
- Koson (village) – Ukraine
- Seda – Lithuania
- Valencia – Spain
