= Gabor Peterdi =

American-Hungarian artist (1915–2001)

- Born: September 17, 1915; Pestújhely, Budapest, Hungary
- Died: August 13, 2001 (aged 85); Stamford, Connecticut
- Known for: Printmaking

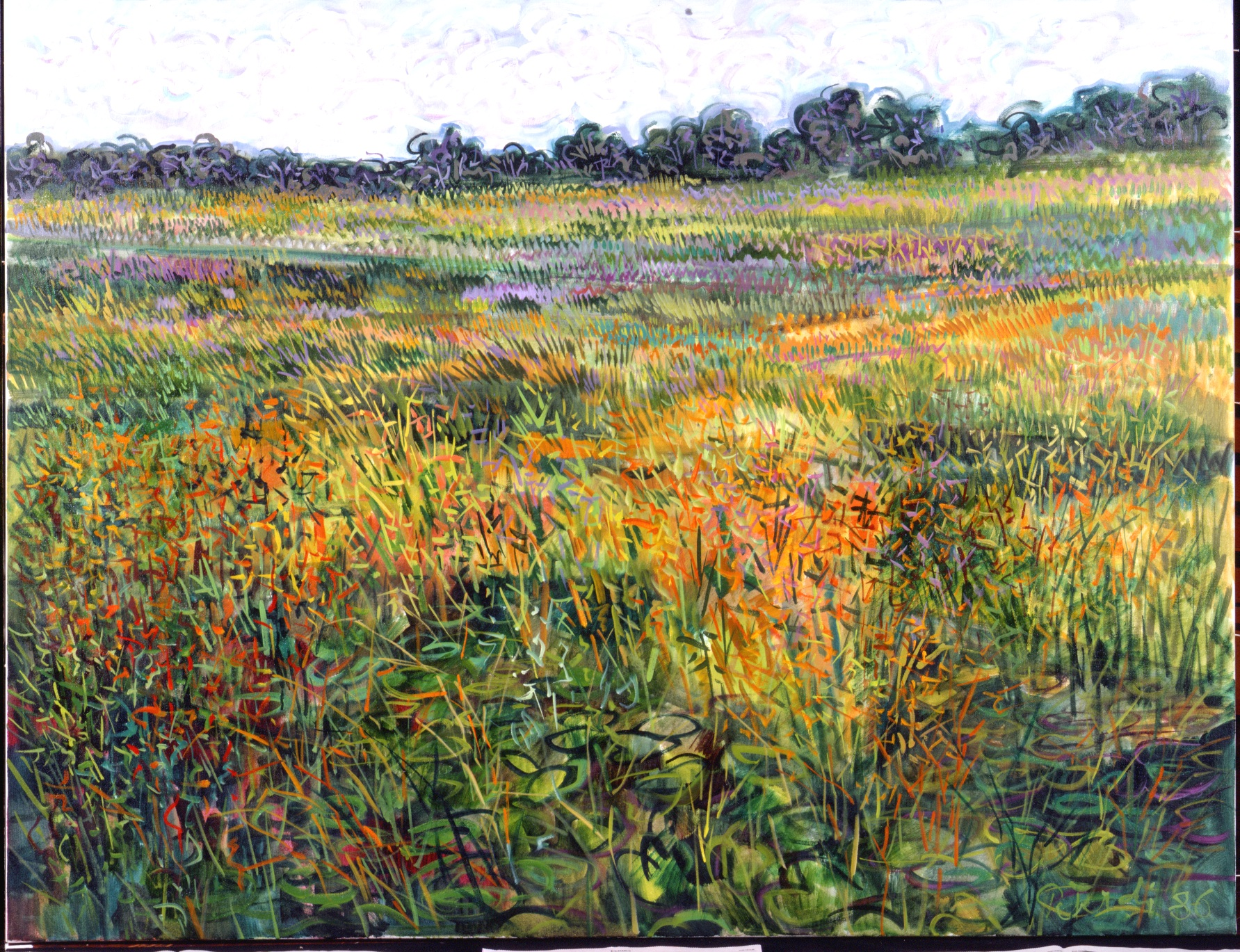
Lavender Meadow by Gabor Peterdi, 1986

Gabor Peterdi (1915 in Pestújhely, Hungary – 2001 in Stamford, Connecticut) was a Hungarian-American painter and printmaker who immigrated to the United States in 1939. He enlisted in the US Army and fought in Europe during World War II. He lived and worked primarily in New York and Connecticut, teaching at the Brooklyn Museum, Hunter College and Yale University in addition to working at his art.

== Early life ==
Gabor Peterdi was born on September 17, 1915 to parents who were poets; they lived in Pestújhely, Hungary, a recently developed northern suburb of Budapest. At the time, this area was still part of the Austria-Hungary Empire. He started working in art from an early age and at 15 won a Prix de Rome to study painting in Italy. After a year, Peterdi went to Paris, where he studied with the British painter and printmaker Stanley William Hayter's Atelier 17. He also studied at the Académie Julian and the Academie Scandinavien.

== Emigration to the US ==
At about the age of 24, Peterdi emigrated to the United States in 1939, at the time of the beginning of World War II in Europe. He first settled in New York, but joined the Army, serving with the United States in Europe during the war.

He established and directed the Graphic Workshop at the Brooklyn Museum Art School. Among his students after World War II was Edmond Casarella, who developed an innovative technique for layering cardboard as a medium to be carved like woodcuts.

Peterdi taught at Hunter College (1952–60) and at the Yale School of Art (1960–87). He was a major influence on younger American printmakers, including Robert Bero and Danny Pierce. Chuck Close served as his assistant while working on his MFA at Yale from 1962 to 1964. He was associated with the New York branch of Atelier 17.

In April 1963, Peterdi traveled to Alaska, lecturing briefly at the University of Alaska-Fairbanks and visiting Anchorage, Nome, Kotzebue, and Point Hope with former student Danny Pierce. Over the following two years, he worked on paintings and prints related to his Arctic experience. In 1964 he was the recipient of a Guggenheim Fellowship. Through this period when New York was the center of Abstract Expressionism, Peterdi maintained his interest in and exploration of the natural world in his work.

Peterdi died on August 13, 2001, in Stamford, Connecticut.

Peterdi's work is held by the Fine Arts Museum of San Francisco, the Cleveland Museum of Art, the National Gallery of Art, the Metropolitan Museum of Art, and the Smithsonian American Art Museum, among other institutions.
