= Soroksár =

23rd District of Budapest Budapest XXIII. kerülete Soroksár
- District of Budapest
- District XXIII
- Flag Coat of arms

- Location of District XXIII in Budapest (shown in grey)
- Coordinates: 47.3964°N 19.1311°E
- Country: Hungary
- Region: Central Hungary
- City: Budapest
- Established: 11 December 1994
- Quarters: List: Millenniumtelep; Soroksár; Soroksár-Újtelep

Government
  - Mayor: Ferenc Bese (Ind.)

Area
  - Total: 40.77 km^{2} (15.74 sq mi)
  - Rank: 2nd

Population (2016)
  - Total: 23,641
  - Rank: 23rd
  - Density: 579/km^{2} (1,500/sq mi)
- Demonym: huszonharmadik kerületi ("23rd districter")
- Time zone: UTC+1 (CET)
  - Summer (DST): UTC+2 (CEST)
- Postal code: 1237 ... 1239
- Website: soroksar.hu

Soroksár (German: Markt) is the 23rd district of Budapest, Hungary.

== List of mayors ==
Member	Party	Date
Ferenc Geiger	Ind.	1994–2019
Ferenc Bese	Ind.	2019–

== Twin towns - twin cities ==
- Törökbálint – Hungary
- Nürtingen – Germany
- Odorheiu Secuiesc – Romania
- Tvardica – Bulgaria
- Tongzhou (Beijing) – China
- Sona – Italy
- Thur – Switzerland
- Gentofte – Denmark
- Liesing - Vienna – Austria
- Gdańsk – Poland
