= Rákospalota =

Coordinates: 47°34′N 19°08′E

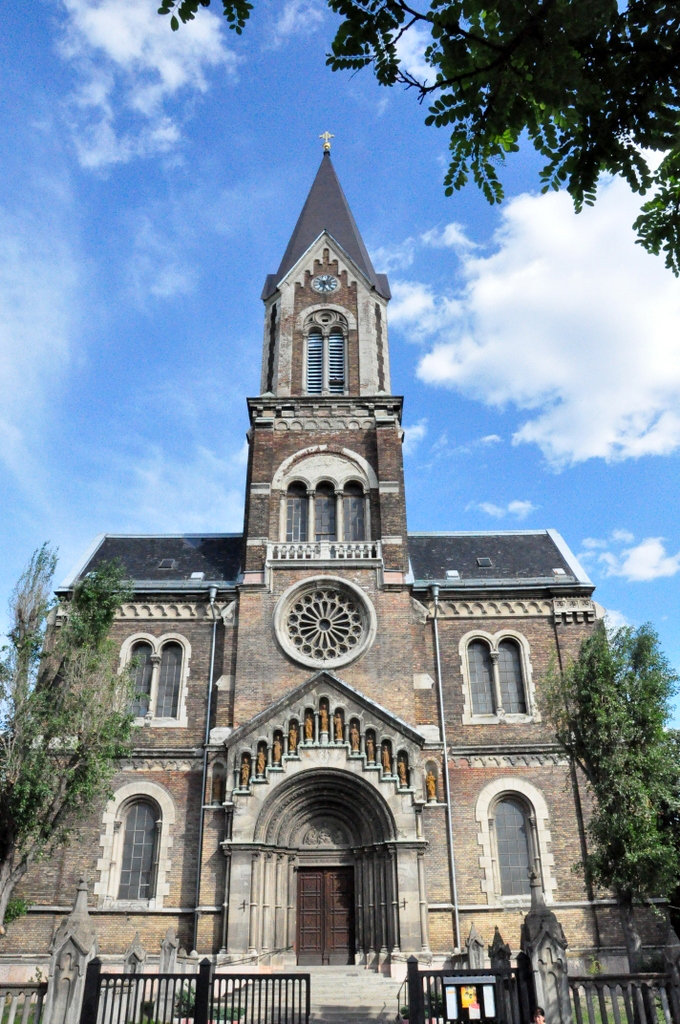
Our Lady of Hungary church in Rákospalota

Rákospalota (literally: Castle [upon] Rákos [brook], German: Palota) is a neighbourhood in Budapest, Hungary. With Pest-újhely and Új-palota it comprises District XV.

== History ==
In the early Middle Ages there were about six villages in the northern part of the Rákos plain. About 1200 A.D. a church was built on the little hill next to the Szilas brook - the ancestor of the present Catholic chapel. The first name of the village was Nyír (Birch) but later it became known as Palota (Palace) after the castle of the landowner. The little community had very hard times in the 16th-17th centuries when Buda was under Turkish occupation, but it survived thanks to the residents' strong Calvinist religion. After the liberation of Buda in 1696, by the Habsburgs, Rákospalota became one of the most prosperous villages in the region. Market gardening and agriculture flourished, and two baroque churches were built: one for the Calvinist community (it was demolished at the beginning of the 20th century) and a little Catholic chapel in 1735 on the foundation of the ancient village church.

In 1846 the first railway line of Hungary (Pest-Vác) reached Rákospalota, and the Forest of Palota became a popular beauty spot with restaurants and places of entertainment. Next to the station a new suburb grew with nice villas for the rich citizens of Pest. In the second part of the 19th century Palota was already out of fashion and later the forest was cut down, but in this neighbourhood there are still some derelict, beautiful old homes.

From the 1890s the spread of Budapest reached the village and the council sold out the ploughland for new suburbs. The residents of Újfalu (New Village), Benkő-telep, Kovácsi-telep and Kertváros (Garden Town) were lower-middle-class people and workers from Budapest. These new settlements have a regular grid layout and pleasant houses with gardens. The old peasant village became known as Öregfalu (Old Village). A sumptuous Gothic Revival cathedral, Lutheran Church, Moorish Synagoge, a new big Calvinist church and a Town Hall marked the wealth of the town but there were serious social tensions between the new and the old residents. Between August and November 1919, a Romanian garrison stationed here, after the Hungarian Bolshevik army was crushed by the Romanian Royal army in the War of 1918-1919. The peasant farmers of Öregfalu kept their rich folk traditions, religion and sense of identity until the 1950s. Rákospalota became a town in 1923 and part of Great-Budapest in 1950.

== Neighbourhoods ==
One of the most interesting and special parts of the district is MÁV-telep. The suburb was built by the Hungarian State Railways (MÁV) in the early 1900s for railwaymen. The big art deco blocks of flats were planned in uniform style. Two churches and a market hall served the spiritual and physical needs of the close, tight-knit community. Unfortunately the new M3 freeway cut into two pieces the "telep" (settlement) in the 1980s, but the leafy gardens, narrow streets and nice buildings breathe a special ambience.

== Landmarks ==
Most of the district around Rákospalota is pleasant, leafy suburb. The Fő utca (Main Street) with the tramway has a typical market-town appearance from the turn-of-the-century. In Juhos utca (Sheep Street) and Attila utca there are still some old peasant houses. The Register of National Monuments consists of four buildings from Rákospalota: Old Catholic Chapel (1735), Old Museum (Classic Revival, 19th century), Liva-malom (mill on the Szilas brook, 18th to 19th centuries) and Girl's College (early 20th century).

The district is home to sports club Rákospalotai EAC

== Sport ==
- Rákospalotai EAC, association football team
- Testvériség SE, association football team
- Újpest-Rákospalotai AK, defunct association football team

== See also ==
- Újpalota
- Pestújhely
- Budapest
