= Pesterzsébet =

20th District of Budapest Budapest XX. kerülete Pesterzsébet
- District of Budapest
- District XX
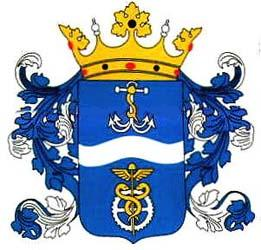
- Flag Coat of arms

- Location of District XX in Budapest (shown in grey)
- Coordinates: 47°26′N 19°07′E
- Country: Hungary
- Region: Central Hungary
- City: Budapest
- Established: 1 January 1950
- Quarters: List: Gubacs; Gubacsipuszta; Kossuthfalva; Pacsirtatelep; Erzsébetfalva; Szabótelep

Government
  - Mayor: Ákos Szabados (Ind.)

Area
  - Total: 12.19 km^{2} (4.71 sq mi)
  - Rank: 17th

Population (2016)
  - Total: 65,321
  - Rank: 14th
  - Density: 5,358/km^{2} (13,880/sq mi)
- Demonym: huszadik kerületi ("20th districter")
- Time zone: UTC+1 (CET)
  - Summer (DST): UTC+2 (CEST)
- Postal code: 1201 ... 1205
- Website: pesterzsebet.hu

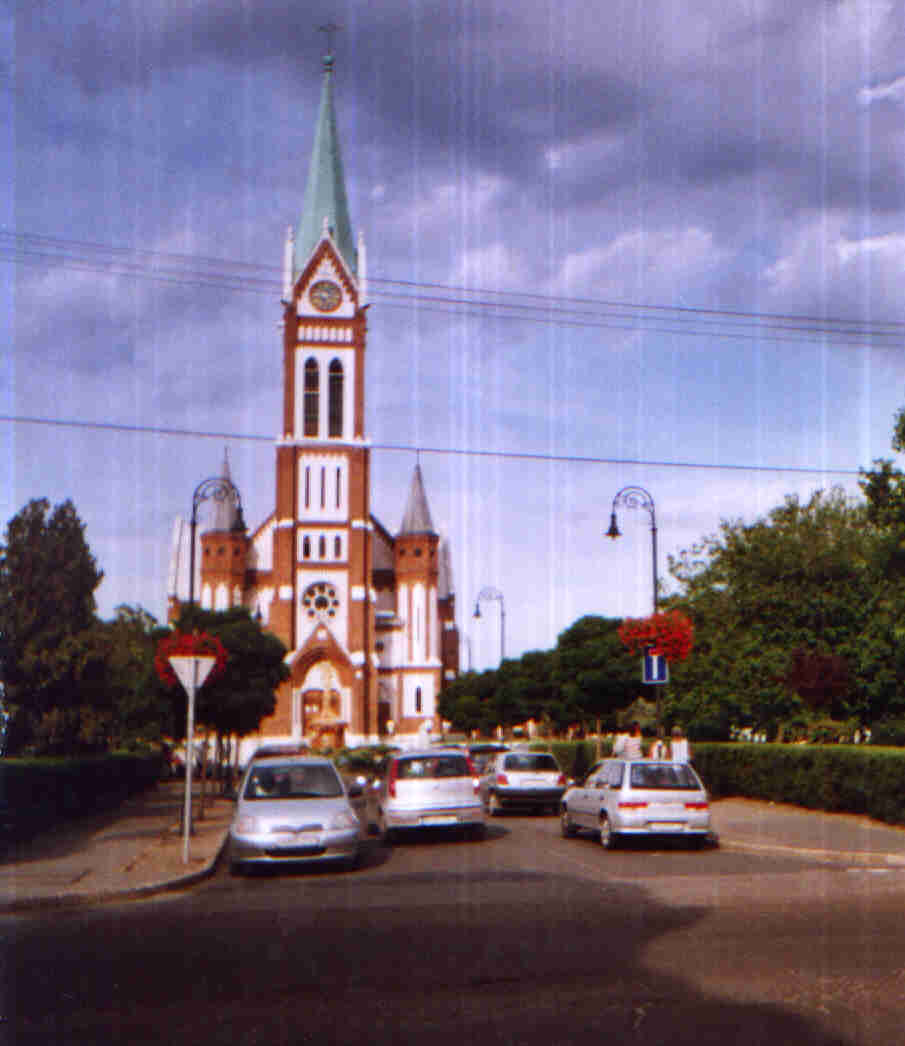
The parish church, Pesterzsébet

Pesterzsébet is the 20th district of Budapest, Hungary. It is located in the southern part of the capital and is the 17th biggest district in the city. It is a mostly suburban area with approximately 70,000 residents.

== History ==
The settlement of Pesterzsébet was named Erzsébetfalva (literally, 'Elisabeth village') until 1924 with a brief period of being called Leninváros ('Lenin town') in 1919 during the Hungarian Soviet Republic, Pesterzsébet ('Pest–Elisabeth') from 1924 to 1932, Pestszenterzsébet ('Pest–Saint Elisabeth') from 1932 to 1950, again Pesterzsébet from 1950 to 1990, again Pestszenterzsébet from 1990 to 1999, and again Pesterzsébet in 1999. In 2012, the settlement was again renamed Erzsébetfalva, but Pesterzsébet continues to be the name of the city district.

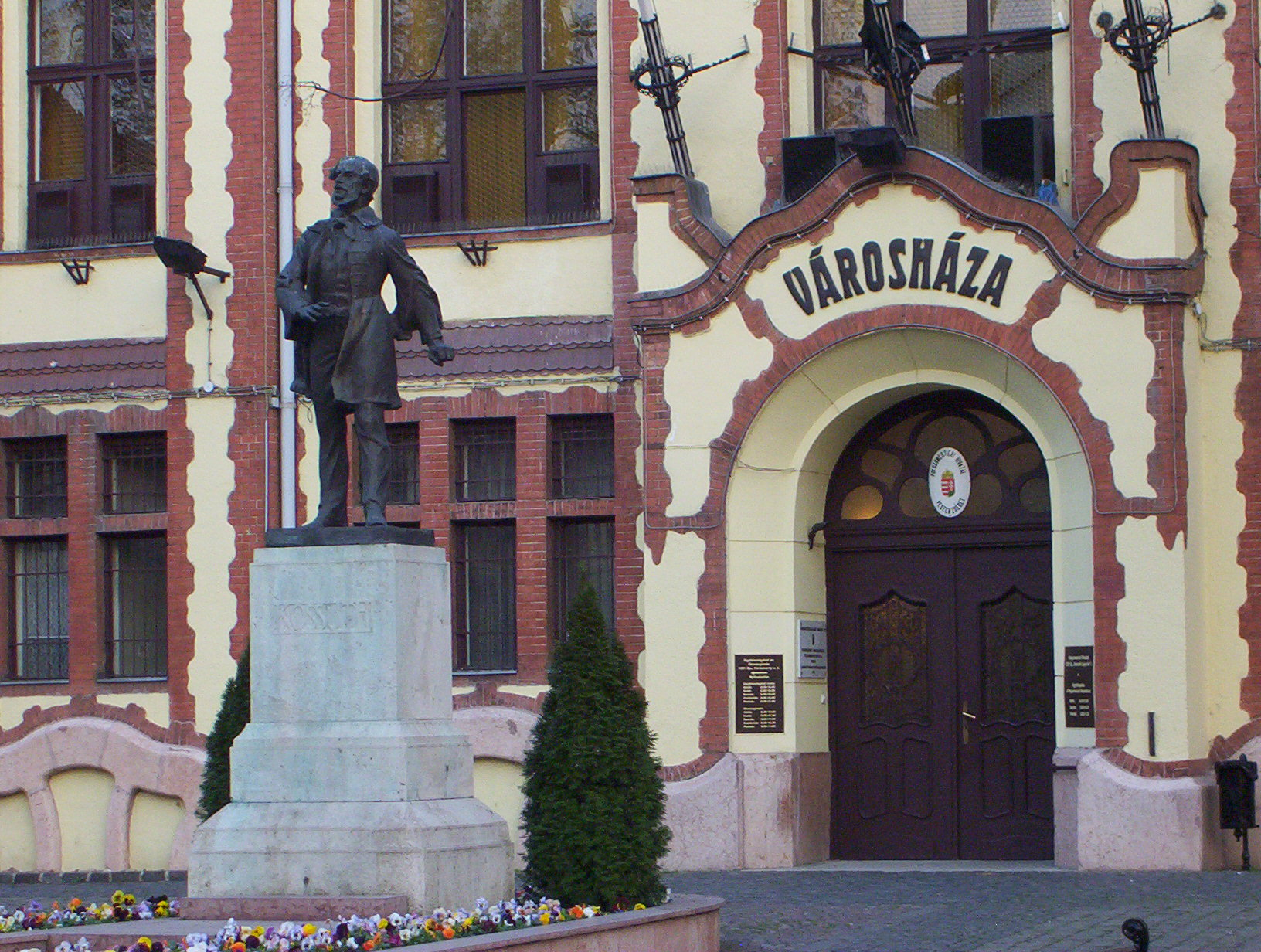
The town center and statue of Lajos Kossuth

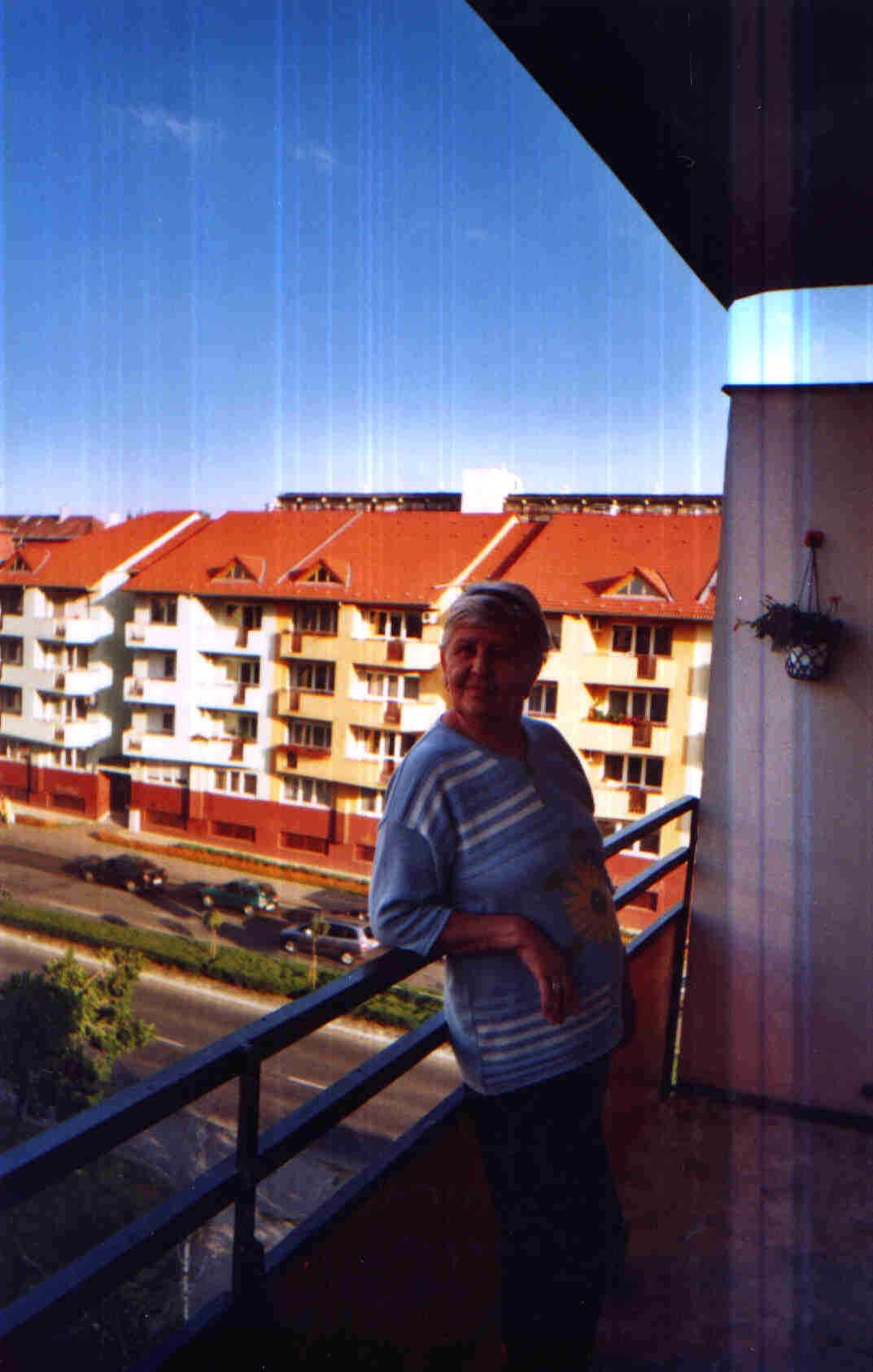
A local and the main street behind

== Sport ==
The most popular sport in this town is association football. The town had one team playing in the top level of the Hungarian football league system, the Nemzeti Bajnokság I. The name of the team was Erzsébeti TC, which played in the 1925–26 season.

== List of mayors ==
Member	Party	Date
Jenő Perlaki	Ind.	1990–1998
Jenő Perlaki	Fidesz	1990–1998
Ákos Szabados	MSZP	1998–
Ákos Szabados	Ind.	1998–

== Gallery ==
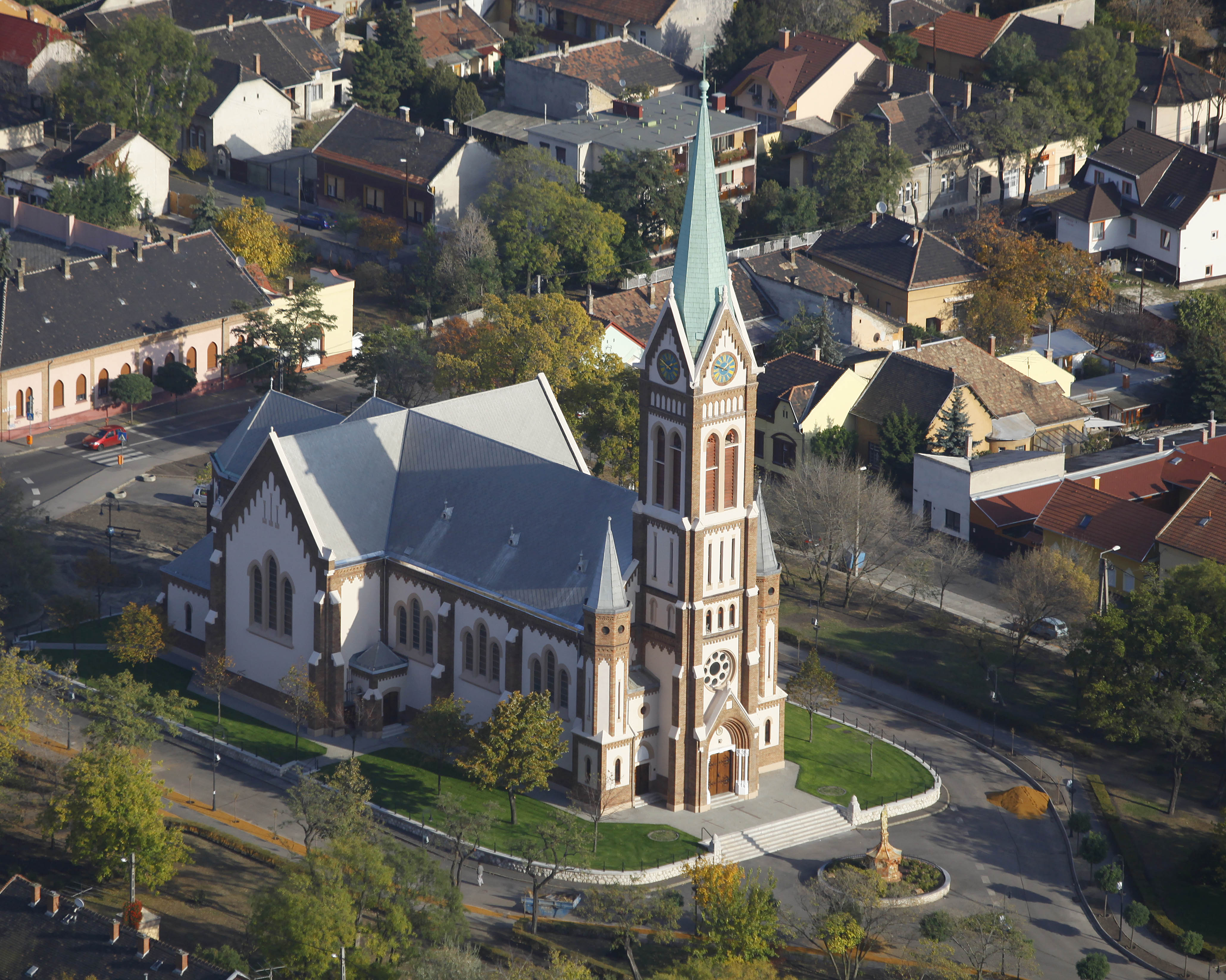

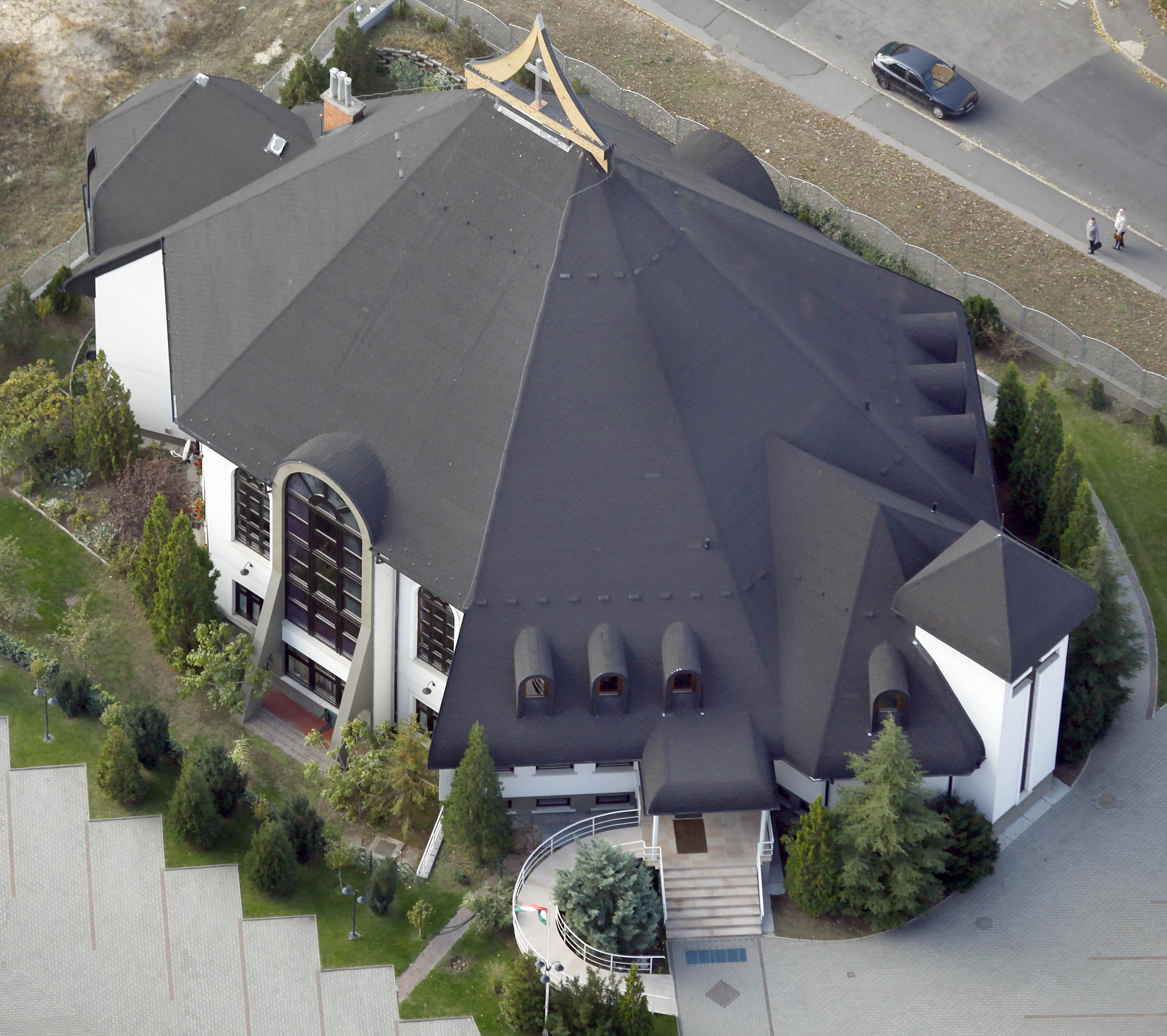

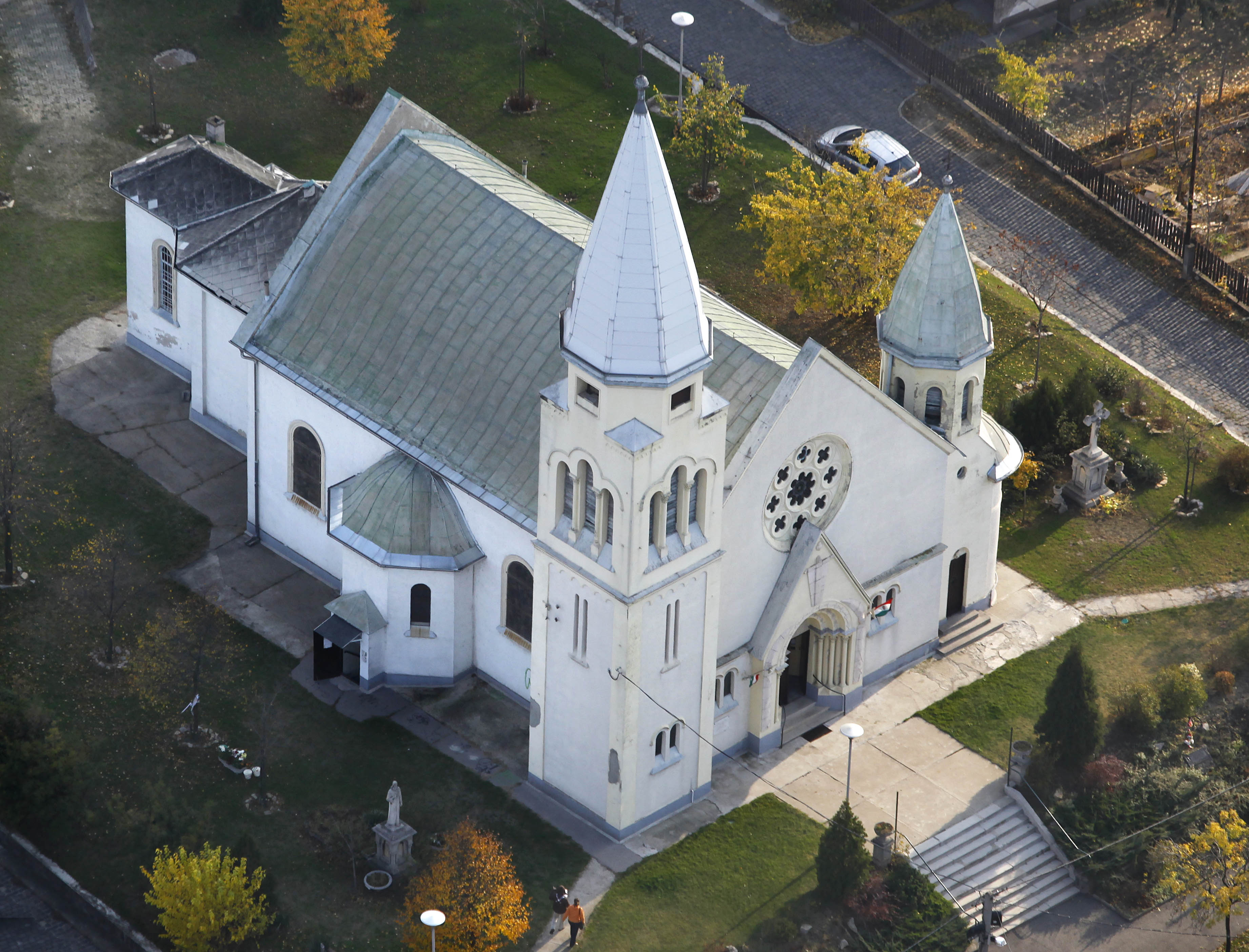

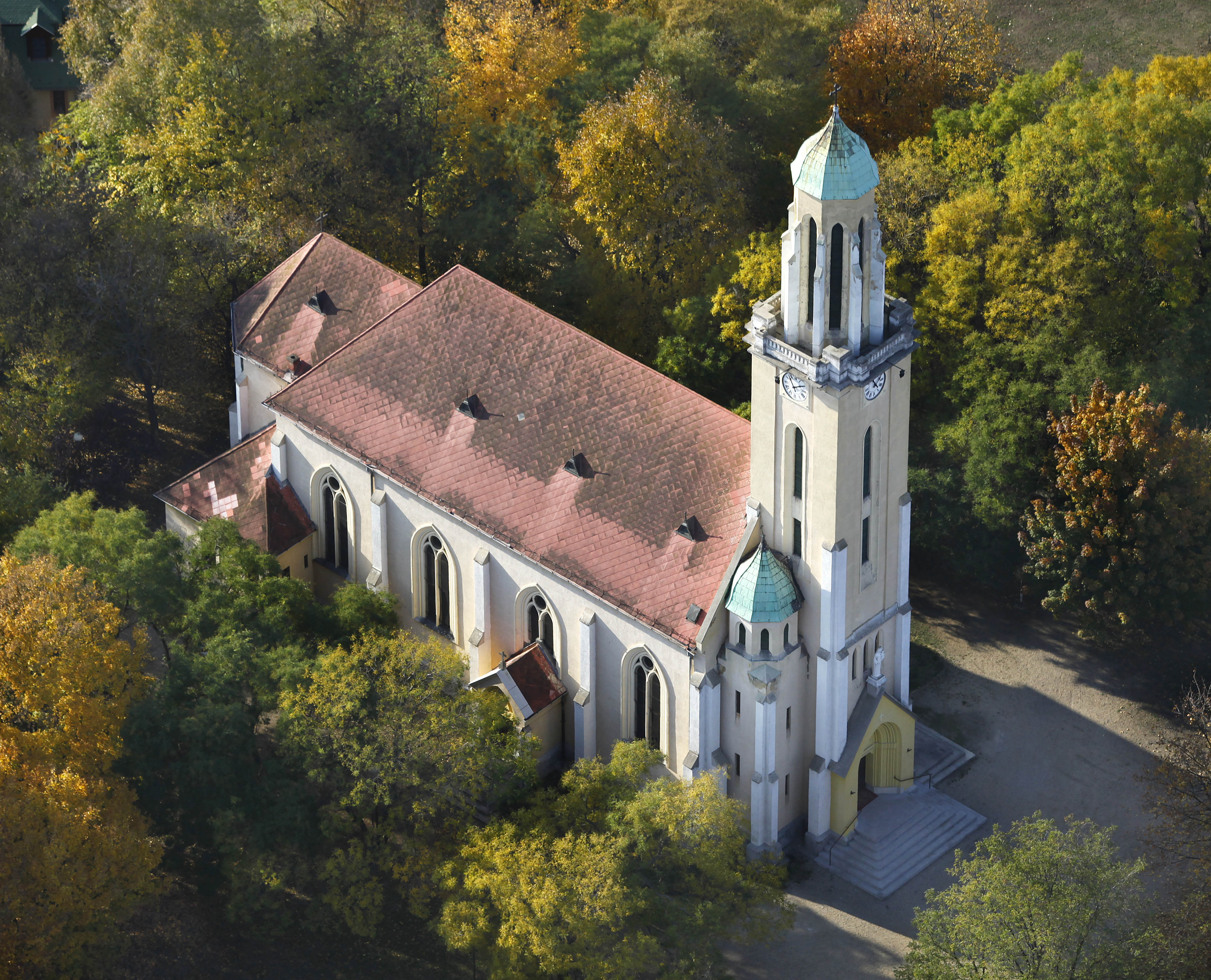

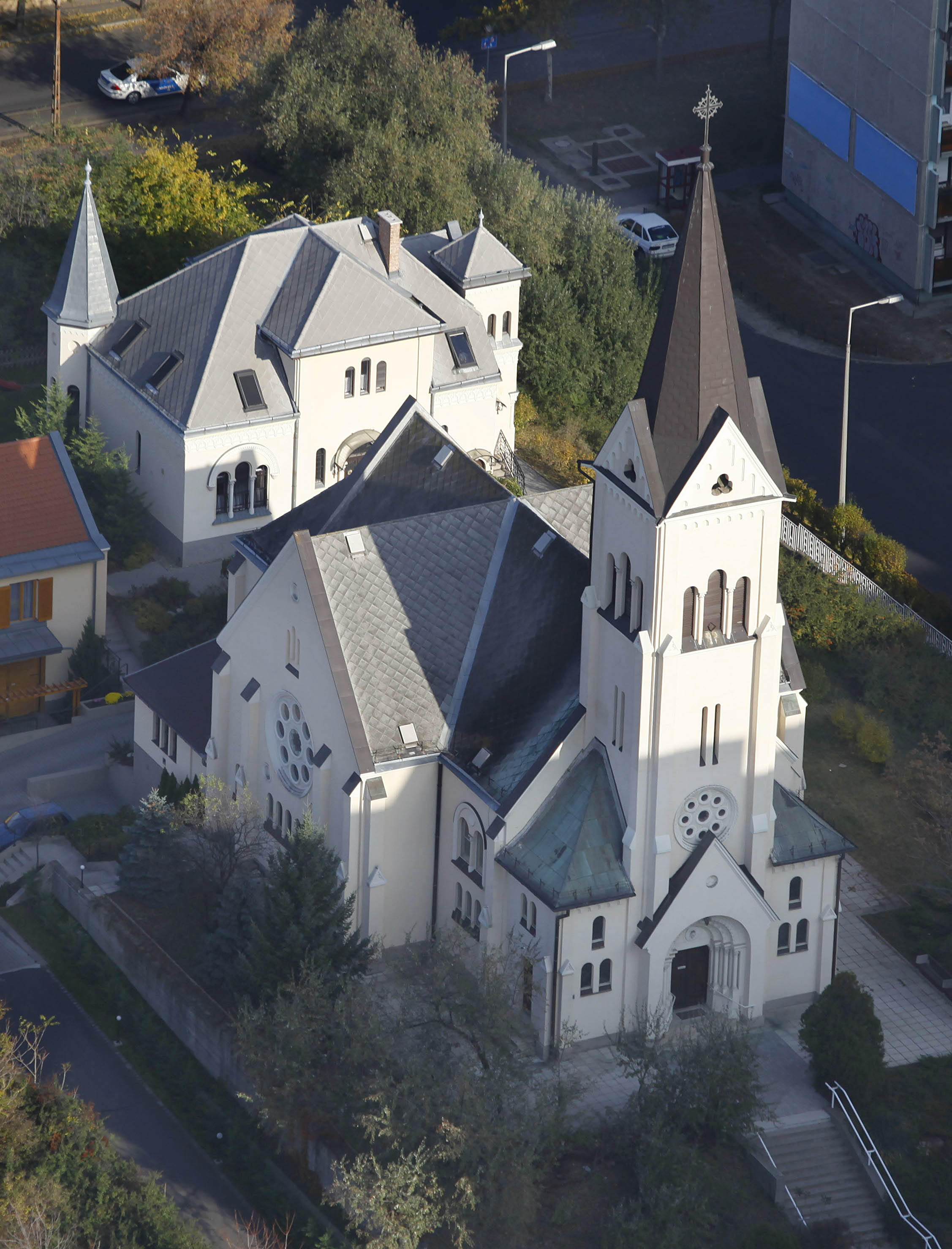

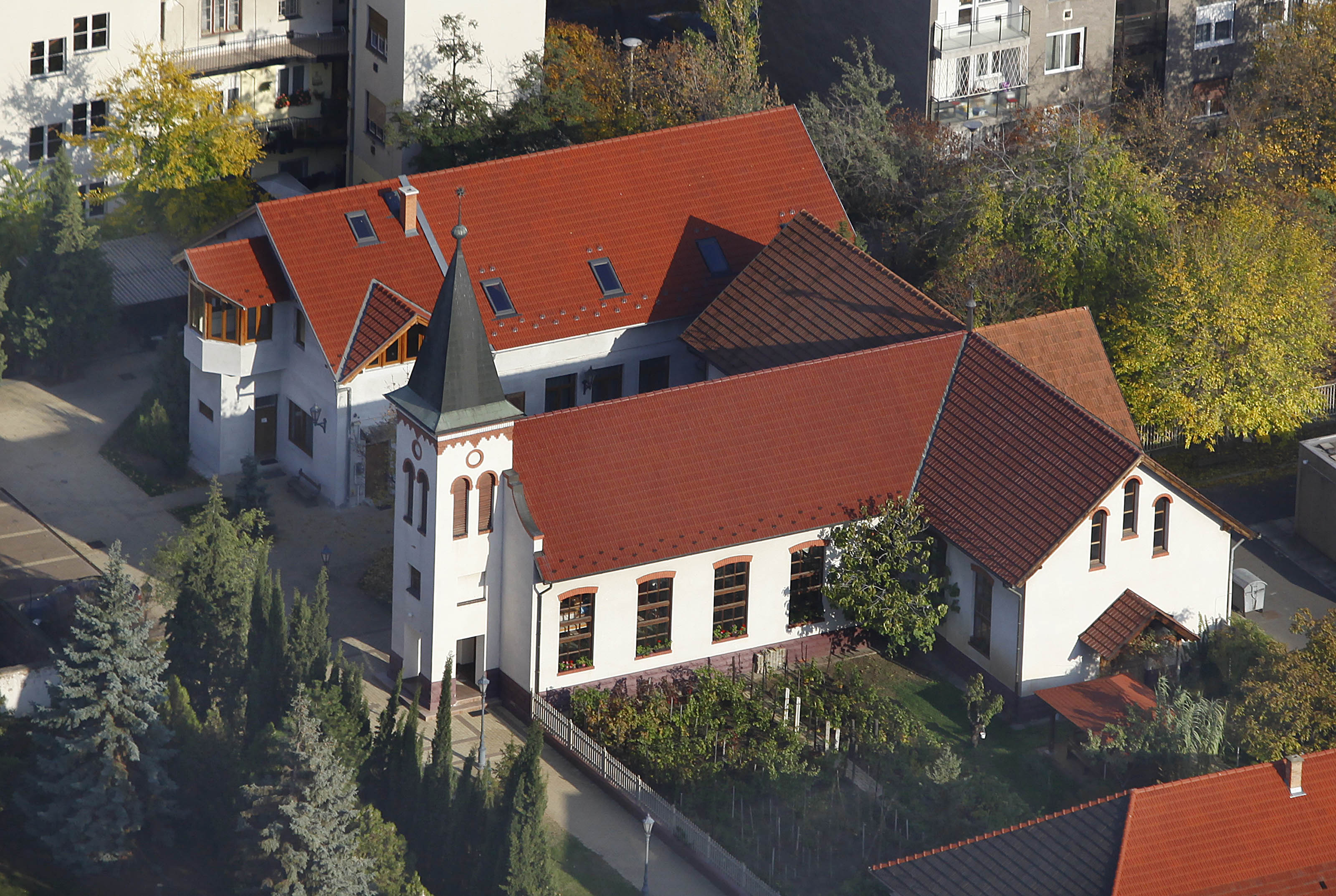

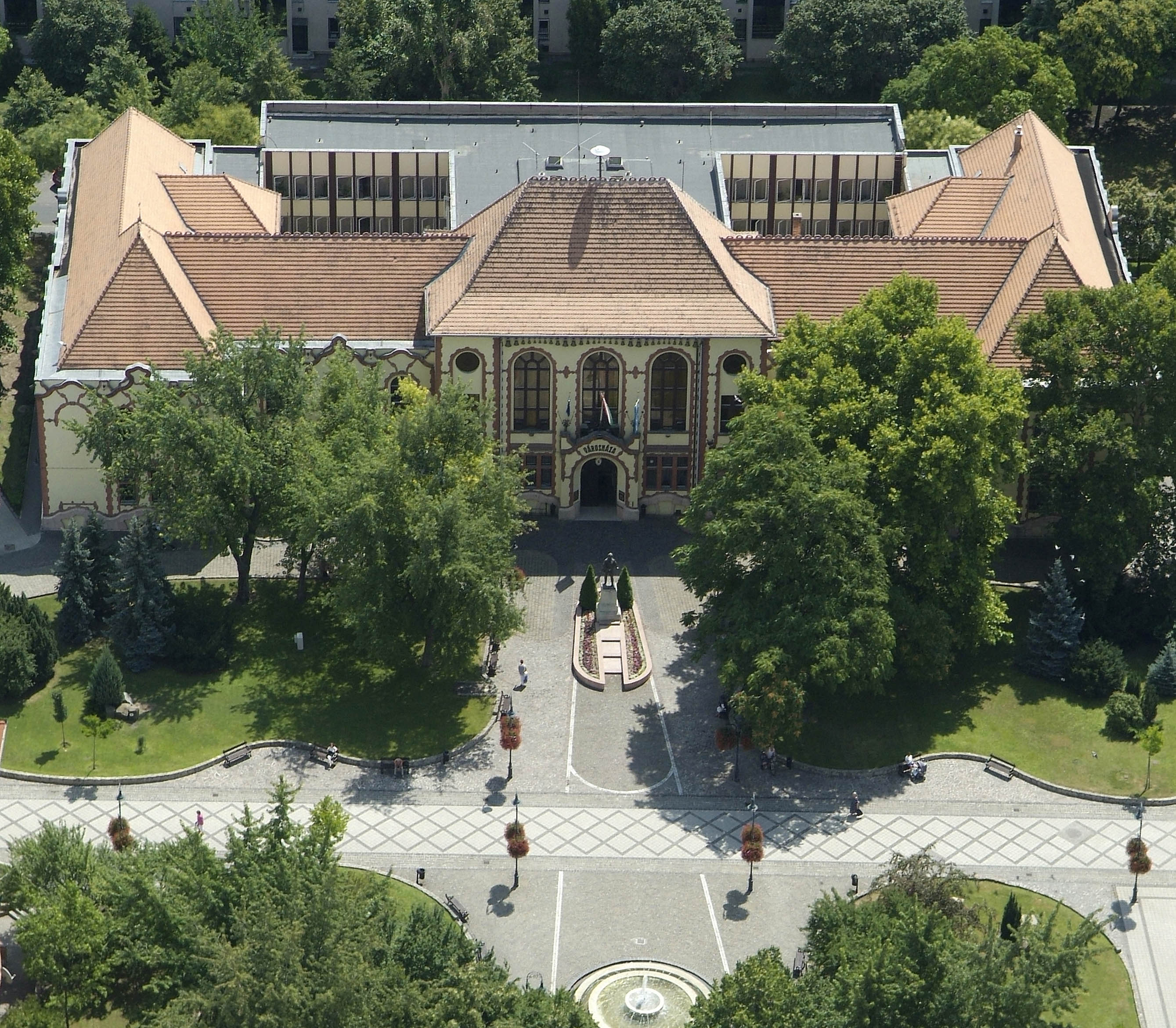

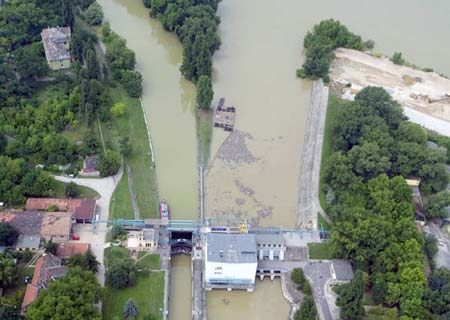

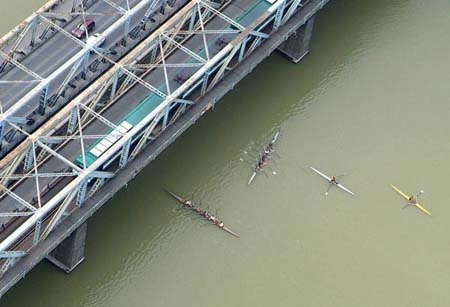

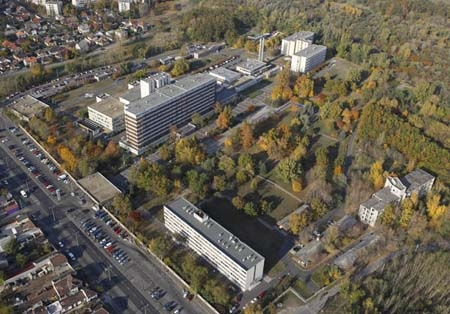

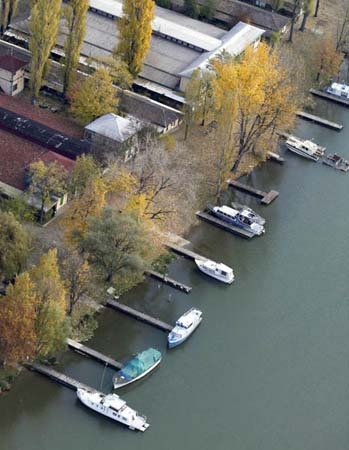

== Twin towns ==
Pesterzsébet is twinned with:

- Alushta, Ukraine
- Belin, Romania
- Cristuru Secuiesc, Romania
- Nowa Słupia, Poland
- Olgiate Comasco, Italy
- Nord-Ost (Frankfurt), Germany

== See also ==
- List of districts in Budapest
