= Pestszentimre =

Coordinates: 47.4020°N 19.1880°E

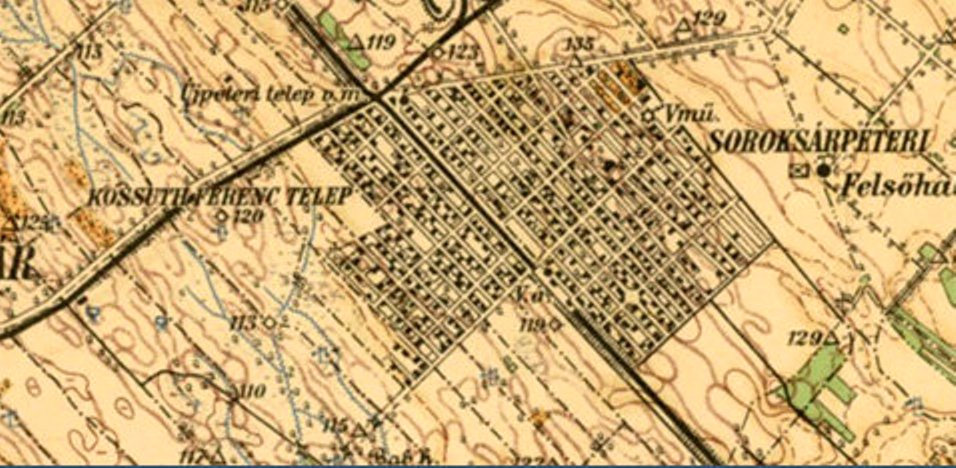
Pestszenimre (1930)

Pestszentimre (Hungarian pronunciation: [ˈpɛʃtsɛntimrɛ], literally Saint Emeric of Pest) is a historic suburban area and former independent municipality in southeastern Budapest, Hungary. Since 1950, it has formed the southern part of Budapest's XVIII District, Pestszentlőrinc-Pestszentimre. It the birthplace of István Harasztÿ (1934–2022), Kossuth Prize-winning Hungarian sculptor.

The settlement developed rapidly during the late nineteenth and early twentieth centuries as part of the suburban expansion of Budapest. Like neighboring Pestszentlőrinc, Pestszentimre became known for its garden-city character, spacious residential plots, and villa-style architecture.

One of the area's most notable neighborhoods is Ganzkertváros (Ganz Garden City), a planned garden suburb established primarily for employees and executives of the renowned Ganz industrial enterprises. Characterized by tree-lined streets, detached houses, villas, and generous green spaces, Ganzkertváros remains one of Budapest's most distinctive examples of early twentieth-century garden-city urban planning.
