= Pestszentlőrinc-Pestszentimre =

18th District of Budapest Budapest XVIII. kerülete Pestszentlőrinc‑Pestszentimre
- District of Budapest
- District XVIII
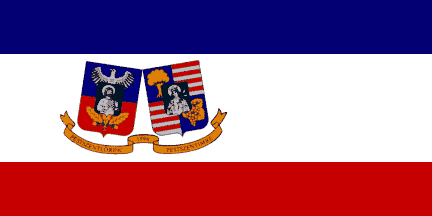
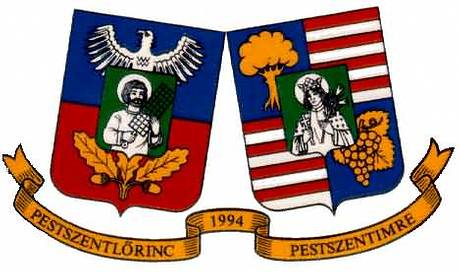
- Flag Coat of arms

- Location of District XVIII in Budapest (shown in grey)
- Coordinates: 47°26′N 19°12′E
- Country: Hungary
- Region: Central Hungary
- City: Budapest
- Established: 1 January 1950
- Quarters: List: Almáskert; Bélatelep; Belsőmajor; Bókaytelep; Erdőskert; Erzsébettelep; Ferihegy; Ganzkertváros; Ganztelep; Gloriett telep; Halmierdő; Havanna-lakótelep; Kossuth Ferenc-telep; Krepuska Géza-telep; Lakatos-lakótelep; Liptáktelep; Lónyaytelep; Miklóstelep; Rendessytelep; Szemeretelep; Szent Imre-kertváros; Szent Lőrinc-lakótelep; Újpéteritelep

Government
  - Mayor: Sándor Szaniszló (DK)

Area
  - Total: 38.60 km^{2} (14.90 sq mi)
  - Rank: 4th

Population (2016)
  - Total: 101,738
  - Rank: 5th
  - Density: 2,635/km^{2} (6,820/sq mi)
- Demonym: tizennyolcadik kerületi ("18th districter")
- Time zone: UTC+1 (CET)
  - Summer (DST): UTC+2 (CEST)
- Postal code: 1181 ... 1188
- Website: www.bp18.hu

Pestszentlőrinc-Pestszentimre (literally Saint Lawrence–Saint Emeric of Pest), also known as the XVIII District of Budapest, Hungarian: Budapest XVIII. kerülete (Hungarian pronunciation: [ˈbudɒpɛʃt ˈtizɛɲɲoːlt͡sɒdik ˈkɛrylɛtɛ] ), is one of the 23 districts of Budapest, Hungary. Situated in the southeastern part of the Hungarian capital, it is the fourth-largest district of Budapest by area, after Rákosmente, Óbuda-Békásmegyer, and Újbuda. The district has a population of approximately 98,474 inhabitants.

The district was created in 1950 when the formerly independent municipalities of Pestszentlőrinc and Pestszentimre were incorporated into Budapest as part of the formation of Greater Budapest. Today, it is known for its suburban character, extensive green spaces, family homes, and historic villa quarters, which developed primarily during the late nineteenth and early twentieth centuries as affluent residents sought summer residences outside the crowded city center.

Pestszentlőrinc-Pestszentimre is the birthplace of Béla Kondor (1931–1972), the acclaimed Hungarian painter, graphic artist, and poet who was awarded the Munkácsy Prize and posthumously the Kossuth Prize. The district is also associated with several prominent Hungarian and international figures who lived or maintained residences in the area. These include the celebrated actress Sári Fedák (1879–1955), the Hungarian-American silent film star Vilma Bánky (1898–1991), who spent much of her childhood and youth in Pestszentlőrinc with her family, and the physicist and statesman Loránd Eötvös (1848–1919), who owned a villa in the district.

Among the most notable architectural landmarks of the district's historic villa quarter is the Herrich–Kiss Villa, today home to the Lajos Tomory Museum. The origins of the estate date back to 1865, when hydraulic engineer Károly Herrich and his wife, Szidónia Deák, purchased the property. The estate, known as the Herrich Manor, functioned primarily as a summer retreat and agricultural holding rather than a permanent residence.

The manor originally consisted of two residential buildings, both regarded among the oldest surviving structures in the district. One now serves as the main building of Bókay Garden, while the other became the Herrich–Kiss Villa. Following Herrich's death, the villa was inherited by his daughter Leonia Herrich and her husband, architect István Kiss. During the 1890s, Kiss transformed the modest manor house by adding a transverse wing and an elaborate glazed wooden veranda. The expanded villa, featuring white façades with decorative red-brick detailing and architectural elements inspired by Northern European styles, became one of the most distinguished summer residences in Pestszentlőrinc's developing villa district.

The villa's landscaped grounds included a rose garden, fountain, sculptures, and ornamental parkland. Contemporary accounts described the residence as one of the area's most impressive holiday villas, and it appeared on promotional postcards used during the parceling and development of Pestszentlőrinc in 1898.

In the late 1930s, the property was acquired by the internationally recognized painter Ferenc Erdélyi, who further remodeled the estate. The villa was enclosed by a decorative fence, an artist's studio was constructed in the attic level, and a terrace overlooking the grounds was added. Following the Second World War, the building was nationalized and converted into social housing.

By the early twenty-first century, both the villa and its garden had fallen into disrepair. Beginning in 2015, the local municipal government initiated a comprehensive restoration program. The building was subsequently adapted as the home of the Lajos Tomory Museum, preserving one of the district's most significant architectural and cultural landmarks.

The district is also home to important transportation infrastructure, including Budapest Ferenc Liszt International Airport, which is partially located within its administrative boundaries. Combined with its historic villa neighborhoods, cultural heritage sites, and extensive green areas, Pestszentlőrinc-Pestszentimre remains one of Budapest's most distinctive residential districts.

Climate data for Pestszentlőrinc, Budapest (1991–2020) elevation: 139
Month	Jan	Feb	Mar	Apr	May	Jun	Jul	Aug	Sep	Oct	Nov	Dec	Year
Mean daily maximum °C (°F)	3.0 (37.4)	5.8 (42.4)	11.3 (52.3)	17.9 (64.2)	22.6 (72.7)	26.2 (79.2)	28.1 (82.6)	28.0 (82.4)	22.5 (72.5)	16.4 (61.5)	9.4 (48.9)	3.5 (38.3)	16.2 (61.2)
Daily mean °C (°F)	0.0 (32.0)	2.0 (35.6)	6.6 (43.9)	12.4 (54.3)	16.9 (62.4)	20.7 (69.3)	22.5 (72.5)	22.3 (72.1)	16.9 (62.4)	11.3 (52.3)	5.9 (42.6)	0.8 (33.4)	11.5 (52.7)
Mean daily minimum °C (°F)	−2.5 (27.5)	−1.3 (29.7)	2.3 (36.1)	7.1 (44.8)	11.6 (52.9)	15.2 (59.4)	16.7 (62.1)	16.6 (61.9)	12.2 (54.0)	7.2 (45.0)	3.1 (37.6)	−1.4 (29.5)	7.2 (45.0)
Average precipitation mm (inches)	31.0 (1.22)	31.3 (1.23)	31.5 (1.24)	34.6 (1.36)	64.8 (2.55)	65.0 (2.56)	74.0 (2.91)	58.7 (2.31)	51.3 (2.02)	44.0 (1.73)	46.8 (1.84)	38.5 (1.52)	571.5 (22.49)
Average precipitation days (≥ 1.0 mm)	6.1	5.6	5.9	5.7	8.4	6.6	7.6	5.3	5.5	6.2	7.0	7.1	77
Average relative humidity (%)	84	77	66	59.2	63.4	63.9	62	62.9	69.2	76.8	83	84.7	71.0
Source: NOAA

== List of mayors ==
Member	Party	Date
Endre Molich	SZDSZ	1990–1994
László Mester	MSZP	1994–2010
Attila Ughy	Fidesz	2010–2019
Sándor Szaniszló	DK	2019–

== Twin towns – sister cities ==
Pestszentlőrinc-Pestszentimre is twinned with:

- Artashat, Armenia
- Băile Tușnad, Romania
- Dąbrowa County, Poland
- Izvoru Crișului, Romania
- Moldava nad Bodvou, Slovakia
- Zrenjanin, Serbia
- Nesebar, Bulgaria
- Nin, Croatia
- Odorheiu Secuiesc, Romania
- Roding, Germany
- San Nicola la Strada, Italy
- Tiachiv, Ukraine

== Gallery ==
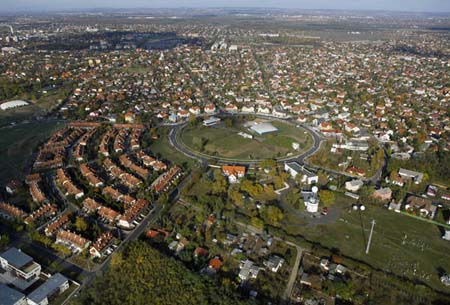

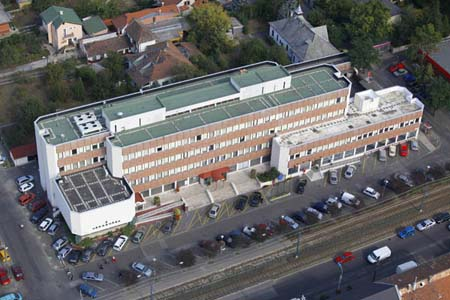

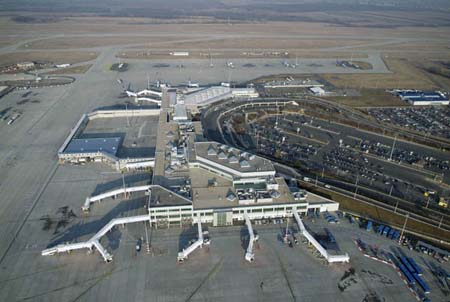

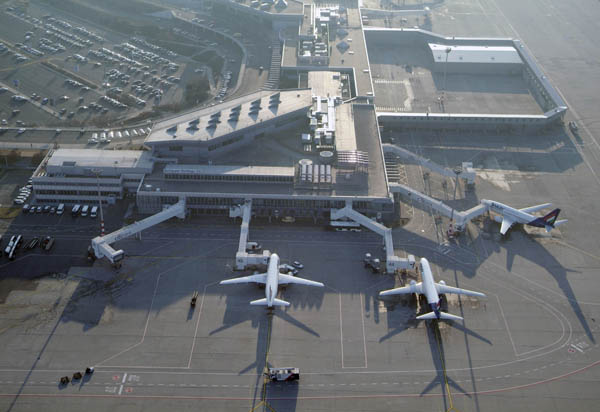

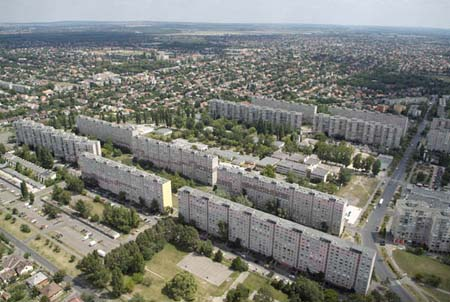

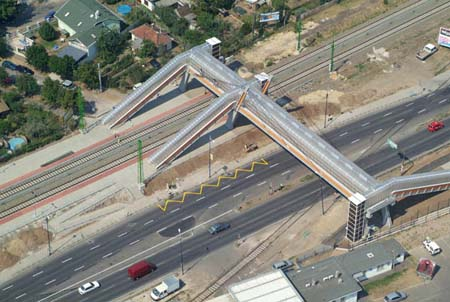

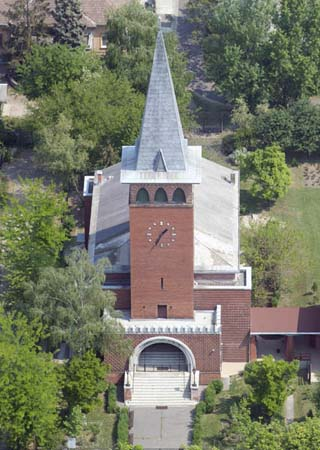

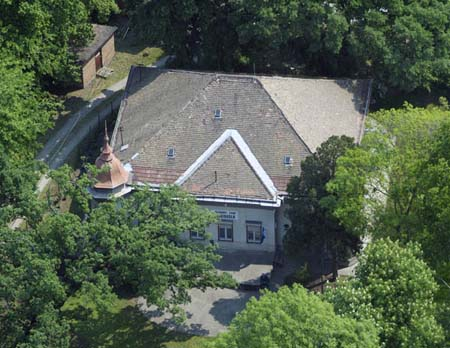

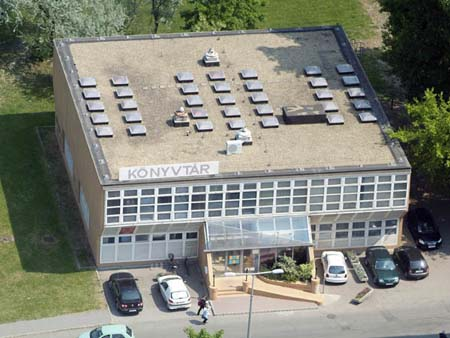
