= Kőbánya-Kertváros =

Coordinates: 47.4849°N 19.2042°E

Kőbánya-Kertváros (English: "Quarry-Garden suburb") is a section of Budapest, Hungary. The area has a largely working class population, most of whom are ethnic Hungarians. in this part of the city, there is a small ethnically Roma (Gipsy) presence to be found. There is also smaller groups of immigrants, notably Asians around the Pest side of Budapest.

The garden suburb was established in 1934, improved in the 1980s. In the 1930s and 1940s it called Gömbös-telep (lit. Gömbös Estate, after Gyula Gömbös), later Városszéli telep (lit. "Estate by the city boundary").

== Sources ==
History of Kőbánya-Kertváros (Hungarian)
