= Újpalota =

Housing estate in Budapest, Hungary

Coordinates: 47°32′36.68″N 19°8′23.9″E

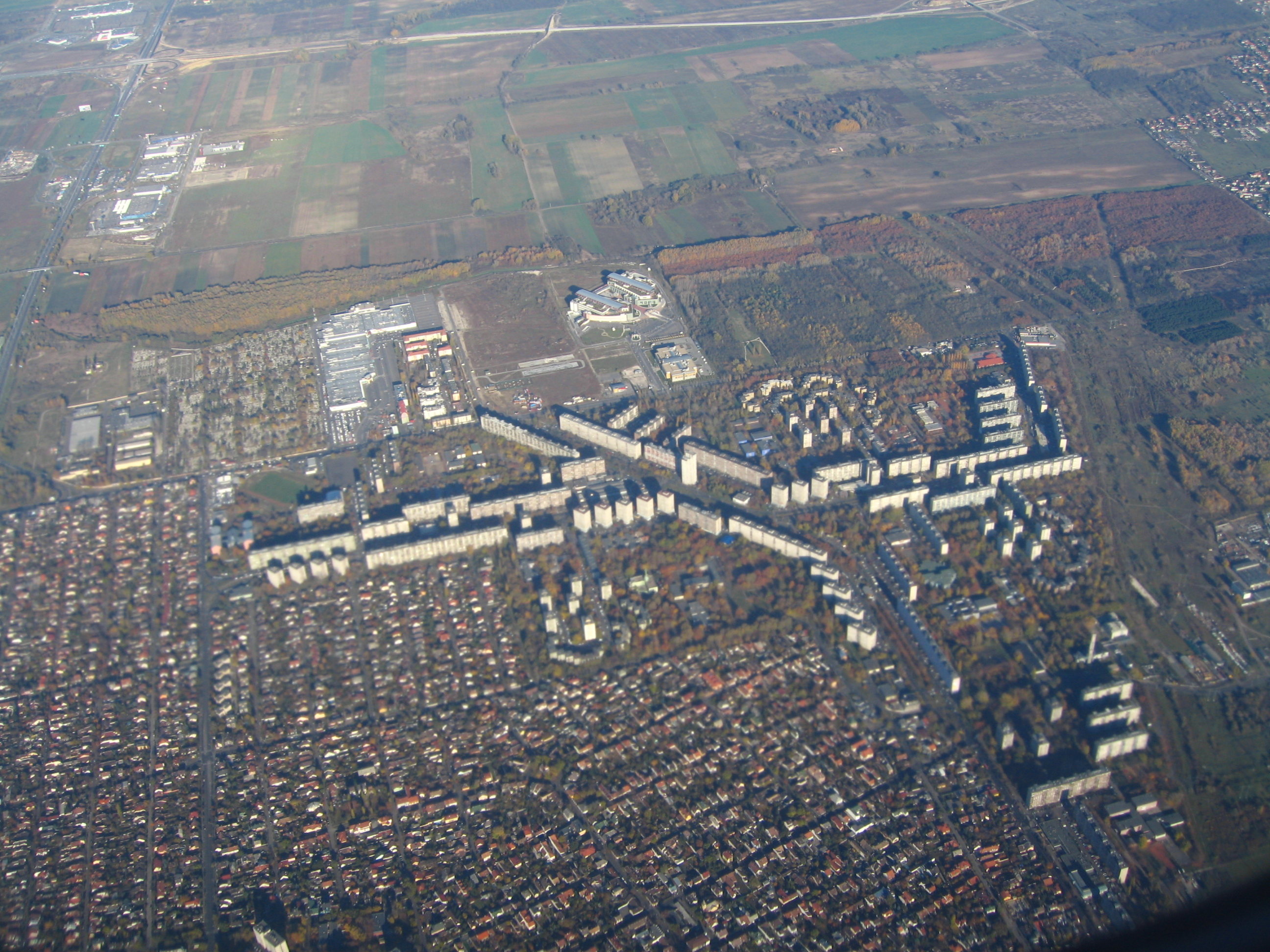
Aerial view of Újpalota

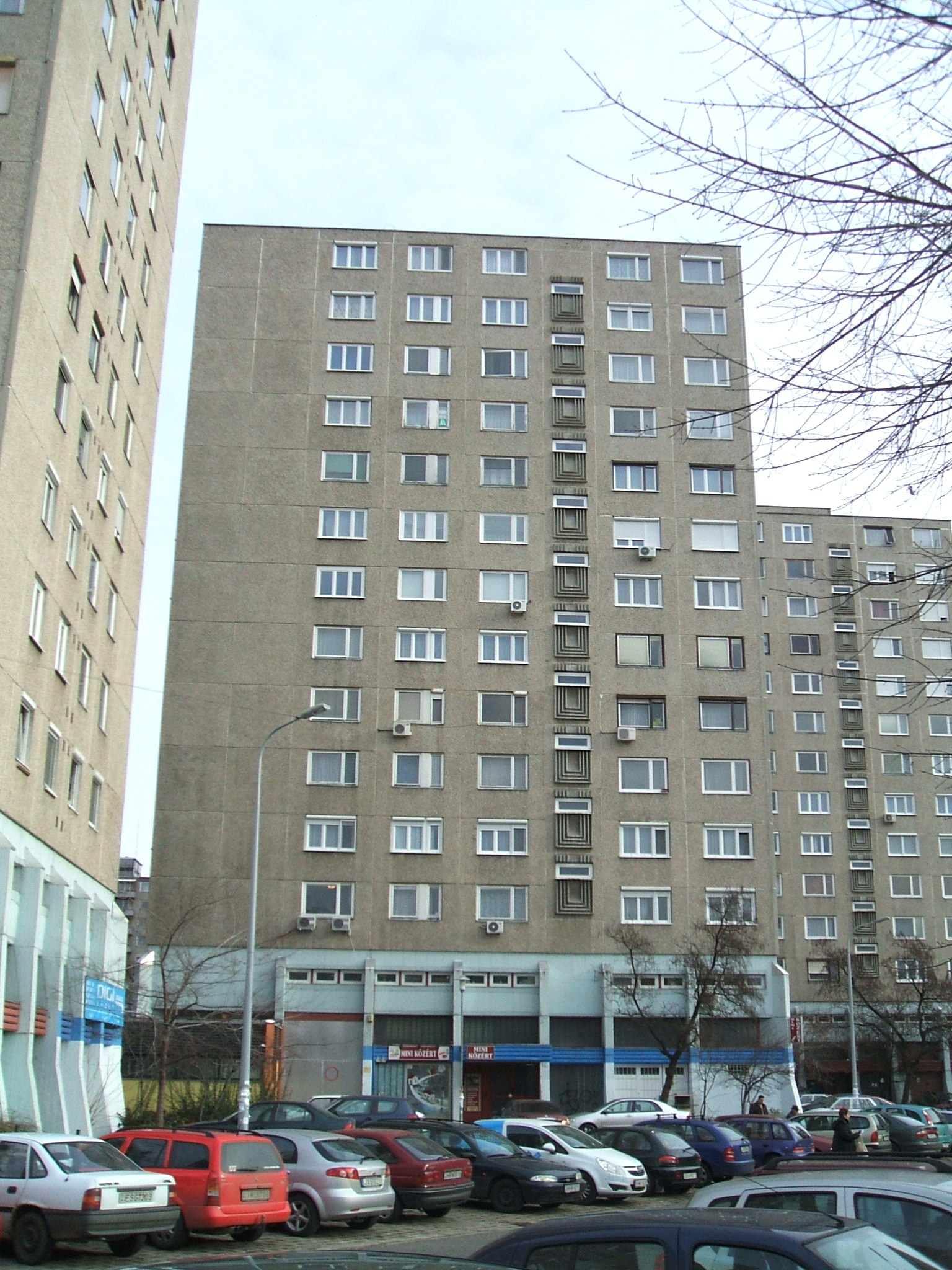
A typical block

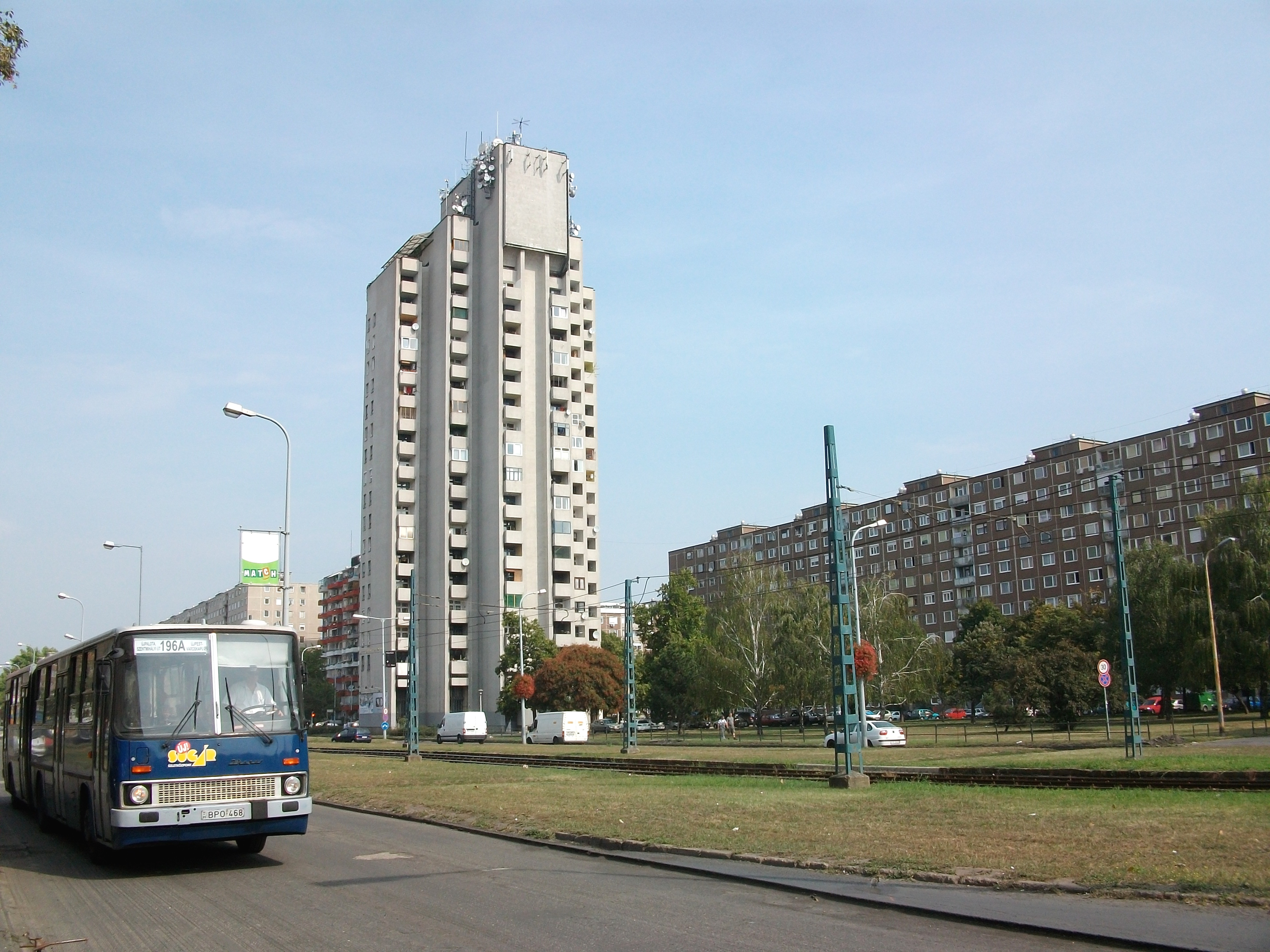
Center of Újpalota with the tallest building, which also functioned as a water tower

Újpalota is a panel housing estate in the 15th district of Budapest, Hungary.

== History ==
In 1969, a new panel housing estate was founded on the northeastern border of Budapest, in a wheat field and a former cemetery, near the Szilas-patak (Szilas Brook), commemorating the 50th anniversary of the Hungarian Soviet Republic (1919). It was named Újpalota (literally "Newcastle") after the adjacent village of Palota ("Castle"), which initially became a suburb of the Hungarian capital, and later part of Greater Budapest.

104 panel buildings (5, 7, 11, 13 and 15-storey blocks) were planned for the area, containing 14,105 flats with an average floor space of 52.6 m^{2} (566 sq ft) (including one-, two-, three- and four-bedroom apartements). According to Tibor Tenke, the architect of the housing estate, the original plan was revised to increase the number of flats to 15,560. Construction was by the BHK III. (3rd Housing Factory of Budapest) using Soviet-Hungarian technology, and was completed in 1978.

== Demographics ==
In the late 1970s, Újpalota had 60,000 inhabitants from all over the country, but mostly from the poor neighbourhoods of Budapest (Józsefváros, Kőbánya, Újpest, Kispest, Angyalföld), where the slum housing was demolished. Újpalota provided these poor families with a large improvement in living conditions, including district heating, piped hot water and flush toilets. According to a 1975 survey, 70% of householders were considered to be "workers", and only 12% had passed the maturity exam (Hungarian: érettségi vizsga), a complex exam at the end of high school in Hungary). 21% of couples raised 1 child, 46% two children and 19% three children.

According to the 2011 census, Újpalota had 33,557 inhabitants, a significant decrease since the late 1970s.

== See also ==
- Pestújhely
- Rákospalota
