= Danny Pierce (artist) =

American artist (1920–2014)

- Born: September 10, 1920; Woodlake, California, U.S.
- Died: March 6, 2014 (aged 93); Kent, Washington, U.S.
- Education: Chouinard Art School, American Artists School, Brooklyn Museum School
- Known for: Printmaking, Painting
- Spouse: Julia Rasmussen
- Children: Julie Pierce, Daniel Pierce, Mary Alvarez, Nels Pierce
- Awards: Honorary Doctorate of Arts

Daniel P. Pierce (September 10, 1920 – March 6, 2014) was a painter, printmaker and sculptor. He founded the University of Alaska’s art department in 1960 and retired as professor emeritus of art from the University of Wisconsin, Milwaukee. In 2012, he received an honorary doctorate of arts from the University of Alaska-Fairbanks in recognition of his accomplishments as an artist and educator and for his contributions to the practice of art in Alaska.

The Bronc Rider, engraving by Danny Pierce, 1955.

== Early life and education ==
Pierce was raised on a cattle ranch in the Mojave desert and took to drawing animals at an early age. His formal training began in Los Angeles at the Art Center School, now the Art Center College of Design, and Chouinard Art Institute, which later merged with California Institute of Arts. WW II interrupted his education when he was drafted into the army in 1942. He saw combat along the Siegfried Line, for which he received a Purple Heart and a Bronze Star; was at Normandy; and served in Germany following American occupation. In 1947, he resumed his studies in New York under the auspices of the GI Bill. He studied with William Gropper and Raphael Soyer at the American Artists School and attended the also no-longer-extant Brooklyn Museum School, where he worked closely with Gabor Peterdi, Max Beckmann and Ben Shahn.

== Commercial and Academic Career ==
In the late 40s, Pierce did freelance illustration for the popular and widely distributed pulp magazine Adventure immediately following the retirement of famed wildlife illustrator Lynn Bogue Hunt. He taught advanced printmaking at Hunter College, where he also took over the beginning drawing class from Clyfford Still in 1951.

In 1953, he moved to Kent, WA and began teaching at various Seattle institutions, including Broadway High School, Seattle University, Cornish College of the Arts, Burnley School of Professional Art (now the Seattle Art Institute), and the Seattle Art Museum. In 1959, he became a Carnegie fellow at the University of Alaska. His year as Carnegie artist-in-residence involved traveling around the state, teaching classes and workshops along the way. The following year he founded the University of Alaska’s art department and created the first academic art curriculum in the State. Among the students he taught in Alaska were Bernard Katexac, Dale De Armond, and Joseph Senugetuk. While in Alaska, he served as an advisor to the Bureau of Indian Affairs. The landmark report that he and economist George Rogers wrote in 1962 for the BIA, after the two of them traveled together through Canada, recommended self-determination and that non-commercial, academic institutions in Alaska host the production of Alaska Native art. He was instrumental in hiring Ronald Senungetuk, who subsequently founded the university's Native Arts Center, to teach in the department.

In 1962, while teaching at the University of Alaska, he also earned a degree in journalism from the institution. In 1965, he was hired to teach printmaking at the University of Wisconsin, Milwaukee. He retired from the University of Wisconsin as professor emeritus in 1984.

== Art ==
Angry Bird, woodcut by Danny Pierce, 1961.

When Pierce moved to Kent, Washington following his studies in New York, the bold color of his work did not conform to the parameters of the Northwest School of painting as defined by Seattle Art Museum Director Dr. Fuller. Fuller considered Pierce's work a negative influence in the Northwest and was supportive of Danny receiving the Carnegie grant, which took the artist to Alaska.

Danny's work was by then receiving broader national and international recognition. In 1958 he was praised as "outstanding" by the Washington Post.

In September and October 2010 a retrospective exhibition of his works took place at the Centennial Center Gallery in Kent, marking Pierce's 90th birthday.

Cascadia Art Museum 12 miles north of Seattle, featured a major retrospective of Pierce's Alaska work. The exhibition, "Modern Alaska: Art of the Midnight Sun, 1930-1970", ran from April to July, 2018.

== Death ==
Pierce died on March 6, 2014, in Kent, Washington. He was 93.

== Artist's Publications ==
Pierce’s Red Door Studio has published 29 limited edition woodcut-illustrated books. The artist composed each of the narratives and set the type, in addition to carving and printing all blocks. Among these books are several children’s stories, a thorough and meticulously researched compendium of American Revolutionary War uniforms, and various ethnographic and zoological volumes. One documents a whale hunt at Point Hope, Alaska. Others are concerned with rural labor, farming, fishing and animal-related subjects. The library at the University of Wisconsin, Milwaukee houses an archive of Pierce's artist books and maintains an online exhibition of them.

== Museum Collections ==
- Bibliothèque Nationale, Paris
- City Art Collection, Kent, Washington
- Cascadia Art Museum, Edmonds, Washington
- Henry Art Gallery
- Museum of Modern Art, New York
- Museum of the North
- National Museum of Sweden
- Seattle Art Museum
- Smithsonian Institution
- Victoria and Albert Museum
