= Béla Kondor =

Hungarian artist (1931–1972)

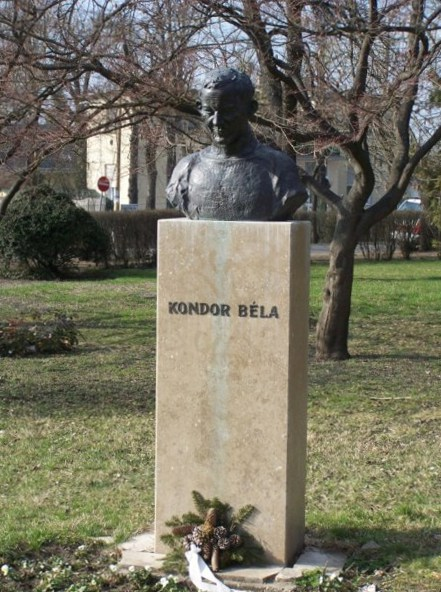
Kondor Béla Bust

Béla Kondor (February 17, 1931 in Pestszentlőrinc, – December 12, 1972, Budapest) was a Hungarian painter, prose writer, poet, photographer, and avant-garde graphic artist.

== Biography ==
His parents were Erzsébet Szedő and Béla Kondor, the family lived in a family house in Pestszentlőrinc. From 1937 to 1941, he attended the Wlassics Gyula utca elementary school, where his talent for fine arts quickly became apparent. As a teenager, he painted still lifes, wrote poems and made airplane models. His passion for flying continued throughout his life and left a mark in his art.

He began his secondary school studies at the Hungarian Royal State High School in the building of the Wlassics Gyula Street school in 1941, but the World War interrupted his studies. After moving several times, the family settled in Angyalföld.

Between 1951 and 1956 he attended the Hungarian Academy of Fine Arts. He studied painting until he was in his third year, but Master Szőnyi advised him against it due to "fundamental differences in professional approach", but Károly Koffán transferred him to the graphics department, where he graduated.

He was a student of Jenő Barcsay, János Kmetty and Károly Koffán. He did not learn many new things in the painting course; he had his specific stylistic tools in his possession almost from the beginning of college. His diploma thesis, which he defended in the summer of 1956, was a series of seven-part etchings called 'Scenes from the Time of György Dózsa', considered anachronistic by the examination board. Some of these pieces later made a deep impression on Albert Camus, who prepared an opening speech for Kondor's planned exhibition in Paris.

He already illustrated books when he was in college. It was exhibited at exhibitions from 1954. In 1957, he went on a study trip to Paris. In 1961, he had an exhibition in Miami. In 1964, he presented a collection exhibition in Székesfehérvár, in 1965 in the Ernst Museum in Budapest, and in 1971 in the Műcsarnok.

He died of heart failure at the age of 41.

== His work ==
Kondor's art broke with the descriptive graphics typical of the 1950s. Strong lines and the passionate inner experience that pervade his works played a major role in his painting. "Going back to Bosch and Dürer, he was excited by all the antecedents that could serve a more suggestive communication, and with great imagination and bravura technique, he expressed the desire for order of a generation that had lost illusions and was running away from illusions". In his compositions, each part of the work carries a specific meaning and these are connected to each other through a system of symbols.

He scratched most of his dreams, thoughts, and struggles into copper plates, he was already an excellent master of the etching technique when he graduated from college. One of the main motifs in his etchings is the airplane, the models of which he often made himself. The ancestor of airplane wings was carried by Ikarus on his shoulders. For Béla Kondor, the wings of the airplane symbolize human flight in space or thought. In the last years of his life, he photographed his airplane structures made of sticks in his studio (Silence and Catastrophe series).

After his death, his works were presented at numerous memorial exhibitions in Hungary and abroad, and his works are kept in several public collections, including the Hungarian National Gallery, the Janus Pannonius Museum in Pécs, the Kiscelli Museum, the Ferenczy Museum in Szentendre, and the Budapest History Museum. During his lifetime, public collections did not buy paintings or graphics from him, he mostly made a living from book illustrations.

His poems were recognized by his poetic contemporaries, including László Nagy, Zoltán Jékely, János Pilinszky and István Csukás, but his only volume published in his lifetime was only received by contemporary critics as a by-product of the visual artist.

== Literature ==
- Éva R. Bajkay: Der Illustrator Béla Kondor. In: Marginalien, 1975, 57. Heft, S. 55-60
