= Petőfi Csarnok =

Former sport and concert venue in Budapest, Hungary

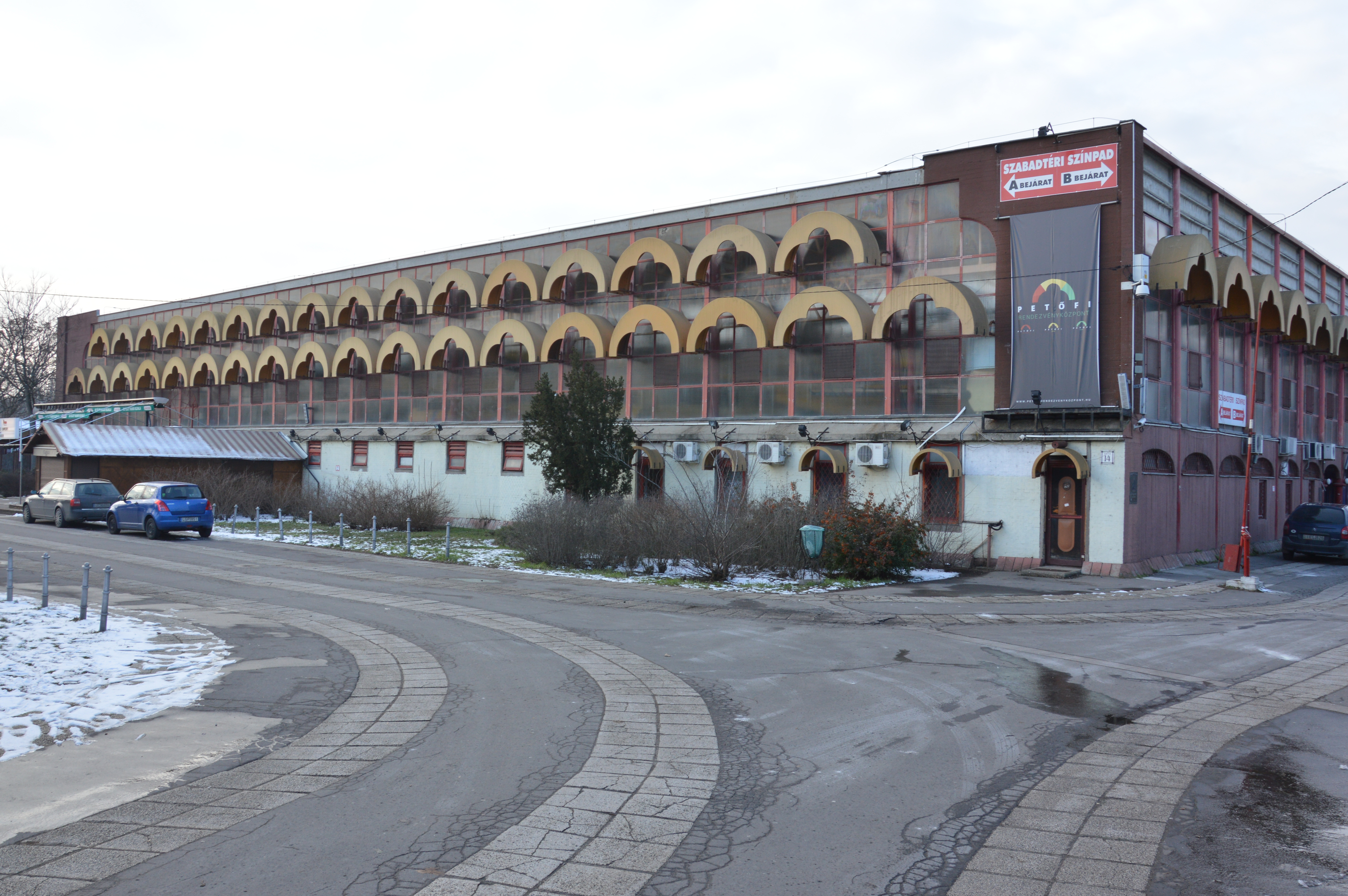
Petőfi Csarnok

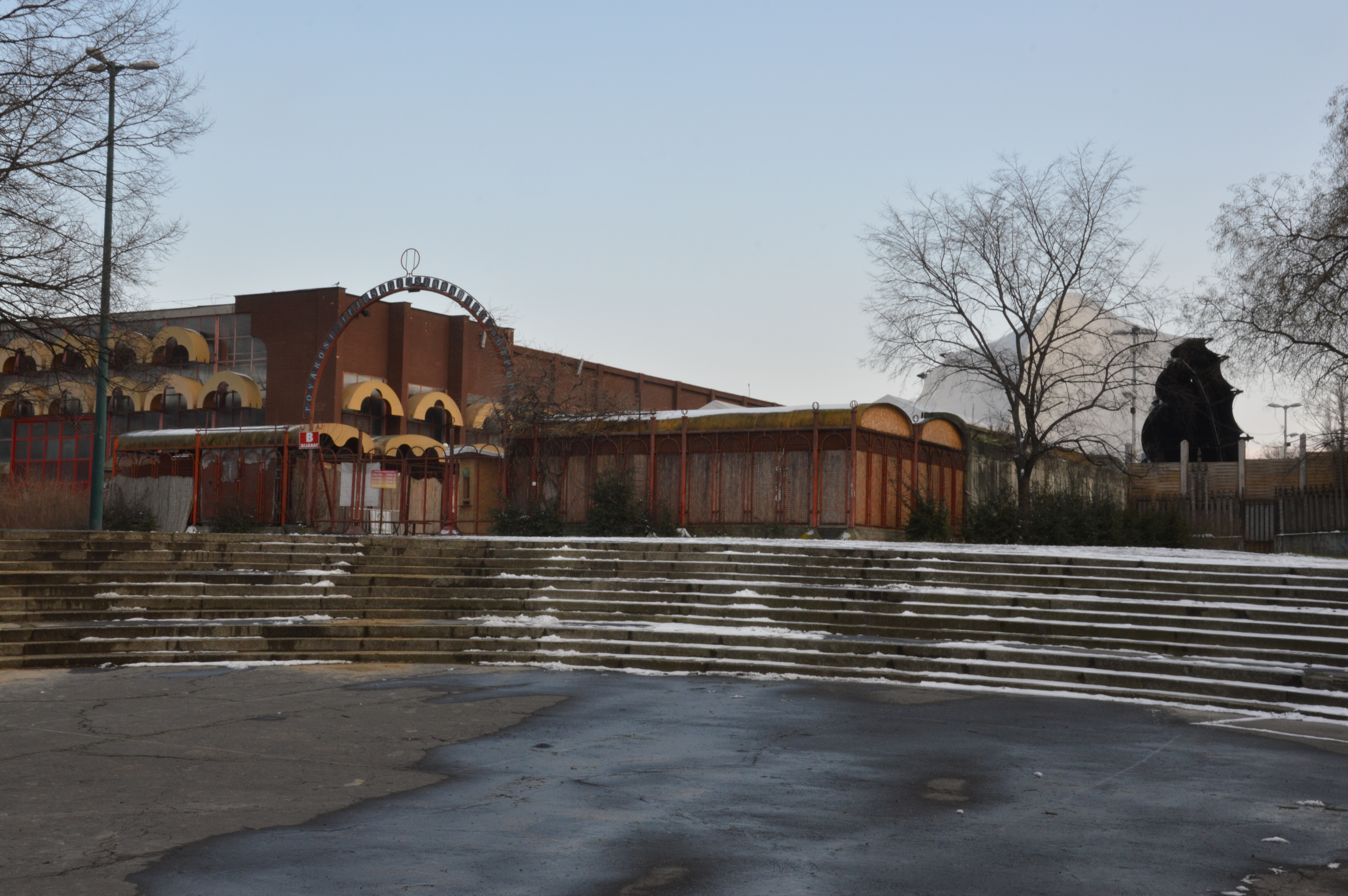
From behind

Petőfi Csarnok (Hungarian pronunciation: [ˈpɛtøːfi ˈt͡ʃɒrnok], "Petőfi Hall"), often called PeCsa, was a leisure center and concert hall in Budapest, Hungary from 2016 to 2017. Placed in the Városliget, it was a famous concert spot for pop/rock music, serving as a home for cultural programs, exhibitions and fan clubs. The building consisted of a 1020 square metre hall, and an open stage with a guest capacity of 4500 people. After a number of delays, the building was finally demolished in early 2017 as part of the reconstruction of the surrounding park.

== History ==
The predecessor of the building was the Iparcsarnok, an exhibition building built in 1885. The building has been seriously damaged in World War II, followed by its demolition. Later the Budapest International Fair built a pavilion on its foundations. By the end of the seventies, the city's former youth center, the Budapesti Ifjúsági Park was in dire condition, so the city council decided upon the building of the Petőfi Csarnok, expanding the former pavilion. The center opened in 1985, serving as the only youth center in the city since then, holding over 15,000 programs, and having more than 10 million visitors.

Since its opening, the hall became more and more obsolete, and different ideas came and gone about PeCsa's total reconstruction, moving or demolition, making its future uncertain for a long time. The comprehensive plan to reconstruct the City Park sealed its fate to become mostly flattened grassfield.

== Sources ==
- History on the homepage
