= Pestszentlőrinc =

Coordinates: 47.44389°N 19.17667°E

Pestszentlőrinc (Hungarian pronunciation: [ˈpɛʃtsɛntløːrint͡s], literally Saint Lawrence of Pest) is a historic suburban area in southeastern Budapest, Hungary. Formerly an independent town, it has formed the northern part of the XVIII District of Budapest (Pestszentlőrinc–Pestszentimre) since 1950.

The district developed in the late nineteenth and early twentieth centuries as one of Pest’s major suburban expansion areas. It is known for its historic villa districts, featuring tree-lined streets, large gardens, and early twentieth-century residential architecture.

Among its notable landmarks is the Herrich–Kiss Villa, a nineteenth-century estate later expanded into a representative villa by architect István Kiss, now functioning as a museum.

It is the birthplace of Béla Kondor, and is associated with several other cultural figures who lived in its villa neighborhoods.

Today, it remains a predominantly residential district characterized by green spaces, suburban housing, and its historic villa quarter heritage.
