= Vincent Longo =

Australian/Italian make-up artist (born 1961)

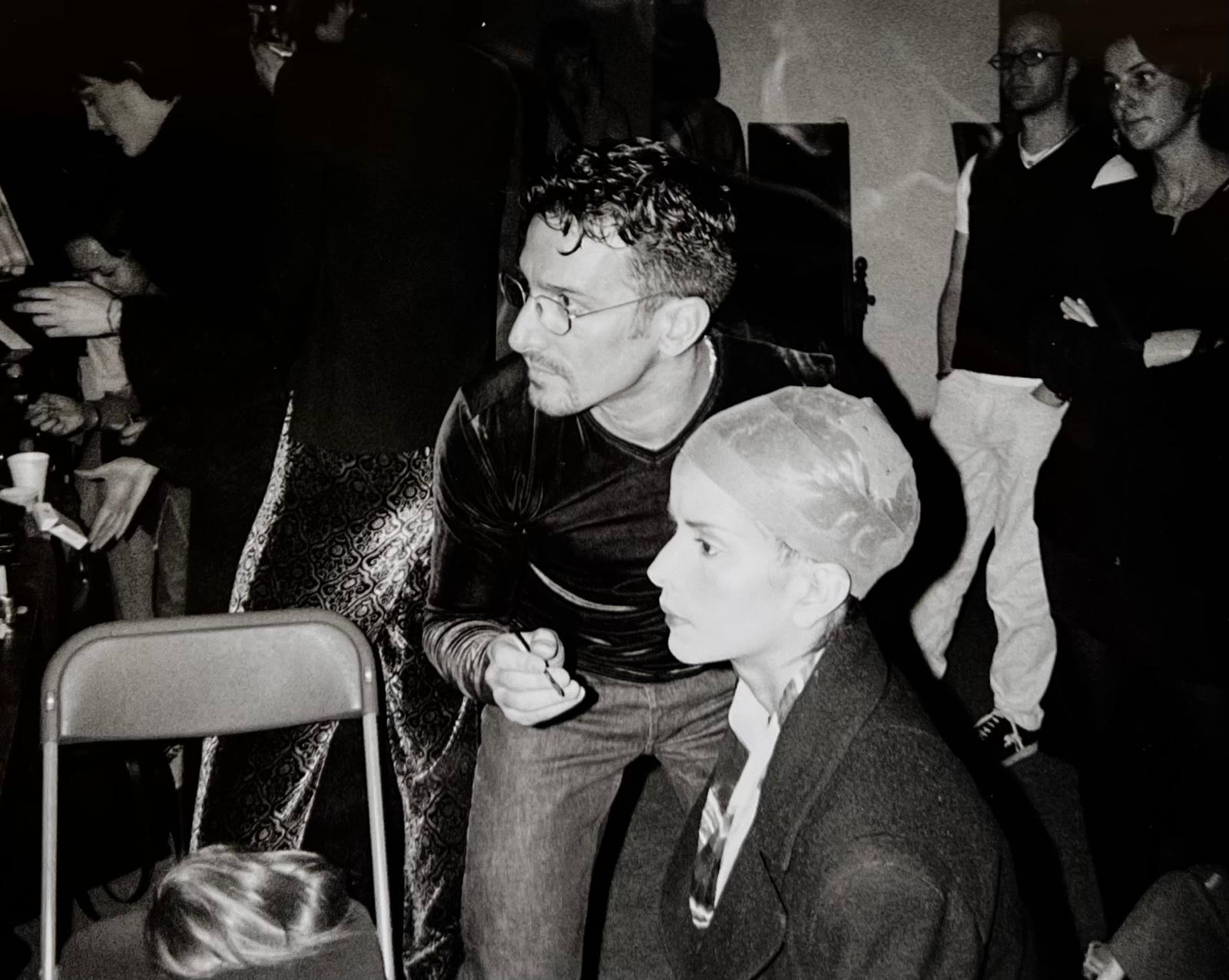
- Makeup artist Vincent Longo creates a runway look for Venezuelan model and actress Patricia Velasquez during London Fashion Week
- Born: May 28, 1961 (age 65); Swan Hill, Victoria, Australia
- Occupations: Make-up artist; beauty expert
- Known for: Vincent Longo Cosmetics

Vincent Longo (born May 28, 1961) is an Australian/Italian make-up artist, beauty expert, and cosmetics entrepreneur, best known for his work with numerous celebrities and fashion photographers for fashion shows, red carpets, and magazine covers and editorials. In particular, he has created cover, editorial, runway and red-carpet “beauty looks” for models, actors and public personalities including Cindy Crawford, Linda Evangelista, Naomi Campbell, Christy Turlington, Heidi Klum, Claudia Schiffer, Elle MacPherson, Julia Roberts, Sigourney Weaver, Hillary Clinton, Ivana Trump, Gwyneth Paltrow, Diane Lane, Claire Danes, Geri Halliwell, Isabella Rossellini and Catherine Deneuve, among many others, earning scores of magazine covers in the process.

== Biography ==
Born in Swan Hill, Australia, to Italian immigrant parents, his family relocated to Ventimiglia, Italy, when he was 17. In Milan, he studied make-up artistry, and worked with Italian designers Gianni Versace, Giorgio Armani, Mariuccia Mandelli, Gianfranco Ferré, Domenico Dolce and Stefano Gabbana and Franco Moschino.

In 1988, he moved to New York City where he worked with fashion photographers Patrick Demarchelier, Gilles Bensimon, Richard Avedon, and Bruce Weber. He took on award show red carpet assignments with various celebrities, served as a contributing beauty editor at Elle USA, and as a product consultant for Revlon, Estée Lauder, and Elizabeth Arden. He routinely provided commentary to CNN for their Academy Awards red carpet coverage, on Good Morning America, E! Entertainment, Extreme Makeover, The Early Show, The Today Show, The Jane Pauley Show, Live with Regis and Kelly. In 2003, he was invited to judge the Miss USA Pageant.

In 1994, Longo launched his own cosmetics label Vincent Longo Cosmetics, distributed by Barneys New York, Neiman Marcus, Bloomingdale's, Space.NK, and Sephora. The brand's products were well received. In 2007, Vincent Longo Cosmetics and Sephora, its chief distributor, ended their relationship, resulting in a loan default. An investor purchased the debt and became Longo's partner in the business which operated under the name Zaimu Business Holdings. Zaimu ceased operations in 2016 after a dispute between Longo and his partner over marketing and product quality. Longo exited, retaining his trademark. The company's products have since been distributed in the gray market. His brand initiated a come-back in 2017.

Vincent Longo is known for his philanthropy, often conjoined to his celebrity relationships, charitable preferences and the promotion of Vincent Longo Cosmetics. For example, his donation to the NYC based Bailey House AIDS hospice earned a weekend takeover of a Times Square jumbotron. In 2002, a two-day fundraiser for AMFAR that he co-hosted with Trudy Styler at the Villa Bagatelle in Cannes, owned by Tunisian billionaire Rafik Khalifa, earned worldwide coverage for himself, the attendees and entertainment. Prior to that event, Longo traveled with Sharon Bush and daughter Lauren Bush to the Venice Film Festival where Lauren appeared as the model for an AMFAR fundraiser partially underwritten by Vincent Longo Cosmetics. In 2006, Vincent Longo Cosmetics sponsored the Bridgehampton Polo Classic in Bridgehampton, NY.
