= Koson, Zakarpattia Oblast =

Koson Косонь Mezőkaszony
- Village
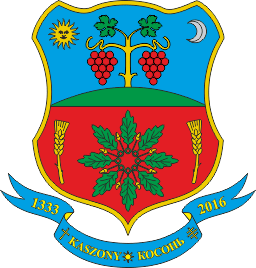
- Coat of arms

- Location within Zakarpattia Oblast Location within Ukraine
- Coordinates: 48°15′21″N 22°27′19″E
- Country: Ukraine
- Oblast: Zakarpattia Oblast
- Raion: Berehove Raion

Area
  - Total: 4.798 km^{2} (1.853 sq mi)
- Elevation: 105 m (344 ft)

Population
  - Total: 2,338
  - Density: 487.3/km^{2} (1,262/sq mi)
- Time zone: UTC+2 (EET)
  - Summer (DST): UTC+3 (EEST)
- Post Code: 90223
- Area code: +380 3141

Koson (Ukrainian: Косонь, Hungarian: Mezőkaszony) is a village in Zakarpattia Oblast (province) of western Ukraine.

== Geography ==
The village is located around 20 km northwest of Berehove. Administratively, the village belongs to the Berehove Raion, Zakarpattia Oblast.

== History ==
It was first mentioned as Kozun in 1332.

== Population ==
Nowadays the population includes 2338 inhabitants, mostly Hungarians.
