= Pestújhely =

Coordinates: 47°32′6″N 19°07′29″E

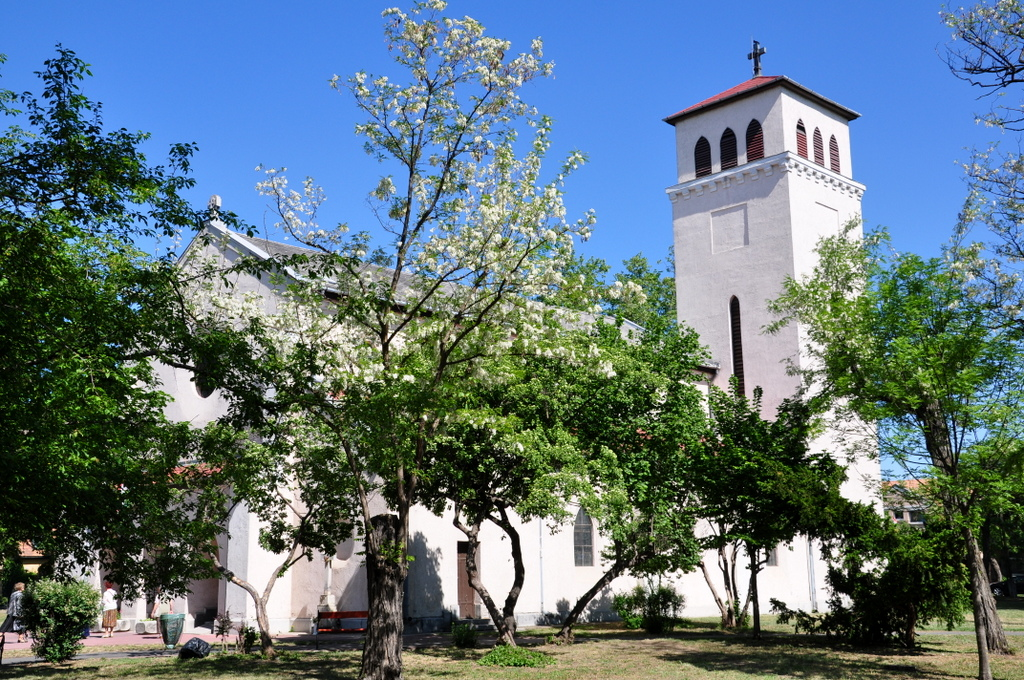
The Roman Catholic church in Pestújhely

Pestújhely (literally: New Settlement by Pest, German: Neustädtl) is one of the northern suburbs of Budapest, the capital of Hungary. It belongs to District XV.

== History ==
Until the second half of the 19th century, this area belonged to the village of Rákospalota and was uninhabited and marshy. In 1897 building plots were sold out by auction and the new settlement became independent from Rákospalota in 1909.

The inhabitants of Pestújhely were clerks, postmasters, railwaymen and other lower-middle-class people, many of whom worked in Budapest. The rapid development of the village continued until the Second World War with the building of houses, churches and schools. In 1950 it became part of Great-Budapest as well as Rákospalota. The small suburb today is a pleasant backwater with a quiet market-town atmosphere. Its landmarks are some old villas and three small churches.

== See also ==
- Újpalota
- Rákospalota
- Budapest
