= BHÉV =

Railway network in and around Budapest, Hungary

Budapesti Helyiérdekű Vasút (BHÉV)

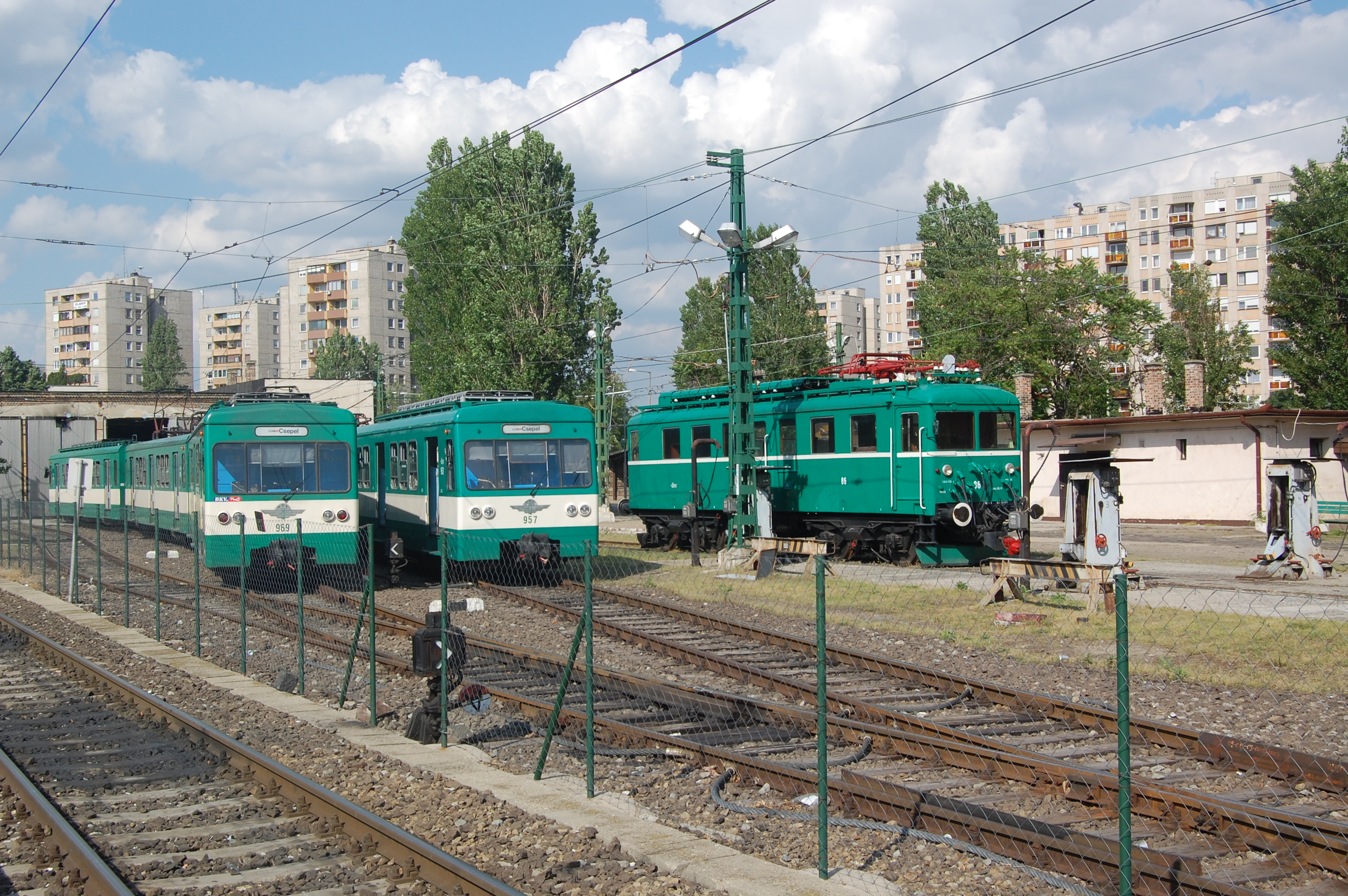

Overview
- Owner: MÁV-HÉV Zrt. (public ownership)
- Locale: Budapest metropolitan area, Hungary
- Transit type: Commuter rail/rapid transit
- Number of lines: 4 (+1 branch line)
- Number of stations: 69

Operation
- Operator: MÁV-HÉV Zrt.

Technical
- System length: 97.0 km
- Track gauge: 1,435 mm (4 ft 8 1/2 in)
BHÉV-lines

BHÉV (Budapesti Helyiérdekű Vasút, "Budapest Railway of Local Interest") is a system of four commuter rail lines (Szentendre HÉV, Gödöllő HÉV, Csömör HÉV and Ráckeve HÉV) and rapid transit (Csepel HÉV and Békásmegyer HÉV (part of the Szentendre HÉV)) lines in and around Budapest, Hungary. The BHÉV operates on standard gauge (1,435 mm (4 ft 8 1/2 in) ), and is electrified at 1100 V DC.

The BHÉV lines were constructed as branch lines of the Hungarian State Railways. Helyiérdekű vasút (HÉV), literally "railway of local interest", is a general term in Hungarian traffic. Therefore, like internationally with the term metro, the stations are marked only with H or HÉV, though this is not the full name of the system. The five BHÉV lines are operated by the public transport company MÁV-HÉV Zrt., a subsidiary of Hungarian State Railways. Inside Budapest, standard BKK tickets and passes are valid on the BHÉV. Outside Budapest, a separate ticket must be purchased.

== Lines and developments ==
Line	Name	Route		Date of opening	Length (km)	Number of stations	Ride time (end stn. to end stn.)
Line	Name	Base station (Budapest)	End station	Date of opening	Length (km)	Number of stations	Ride time (end stn. to end stn.)
Line 5 (BHÉV)	Szentendrei HÉV	Batthyány tér	Szentendre	17 August 1888	20.9	17	38-40 minutes
Line 6 (BHÉV)	Ráckevei HÉV	Közvágóhíd	Ráckeve	7 August 1887	40.3	22	69-75 minutes
Line 7 (BHÉV)	Csepeli HÉV	Boráros tér	Csepel	29 April 1951	6.7	6	13-15 minutes
Line 8 (BHÉV) Line 9 (BHÉV)	Gödöllői HÉV; Csömöri HÉV	Örs vezér tere	Gödöllő; Csömör	20 July 1888	24.7; 10.9	20; 12	46-53 minutes 23-25 minutes
Total:					97.0	69	

=== Network ===
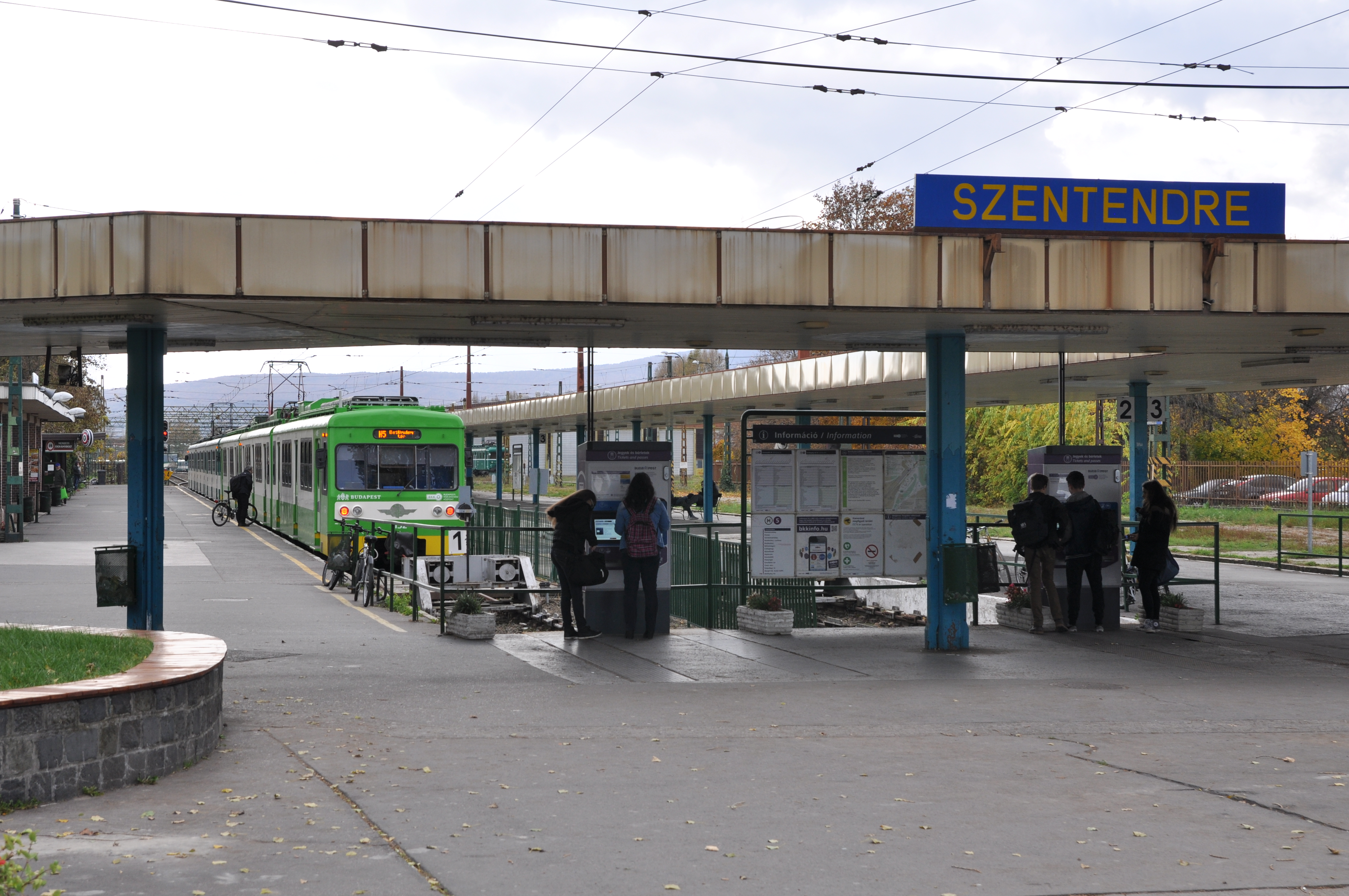
HÉV terminus at Szentendre

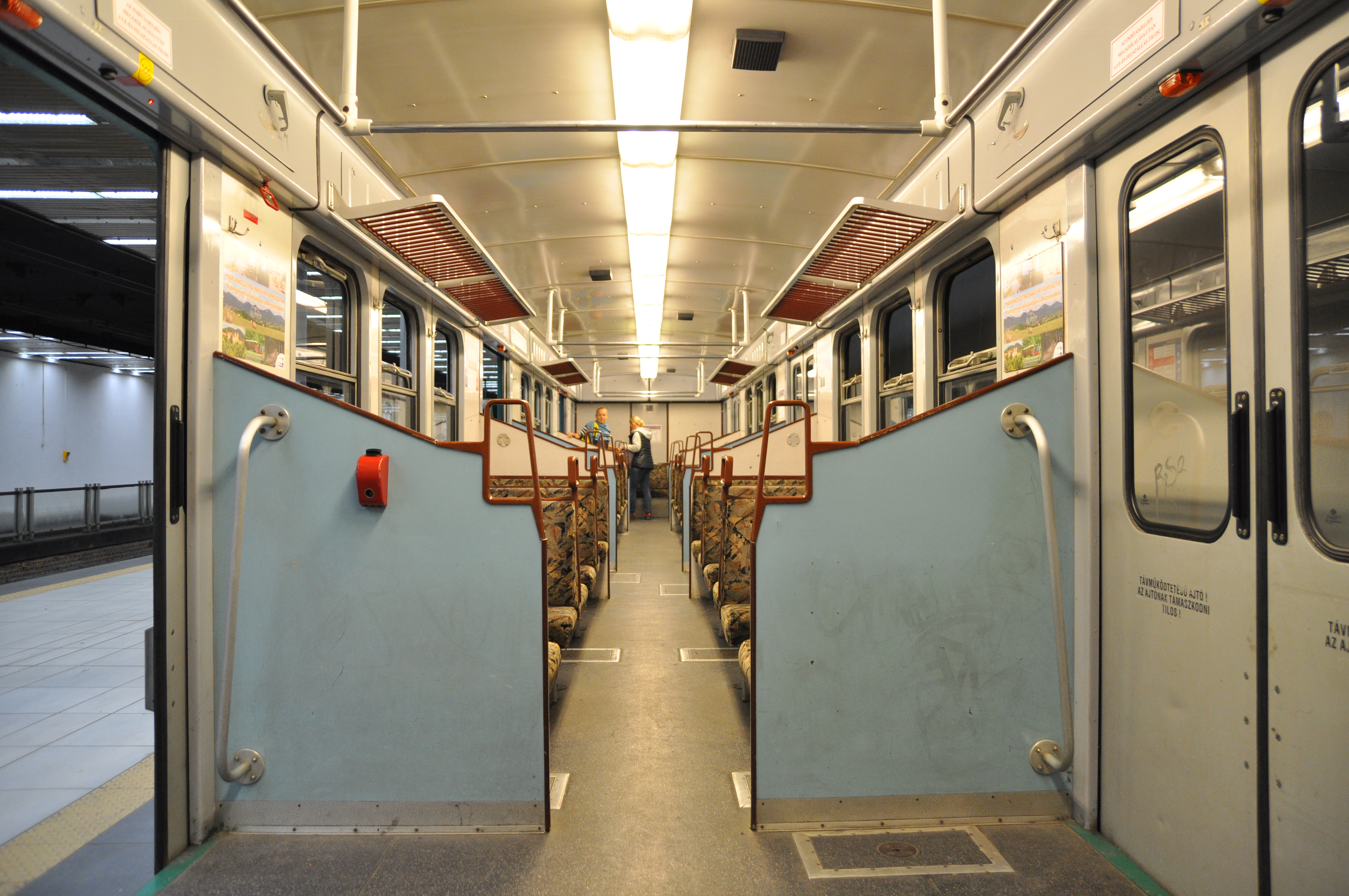
HÉV interior

The BHÉV lines connect Csepel (south), Ráckeve (far south), Gödöllő (northeast), and Szentendre (north) with various points of central Budapest. The four BHÉV lines are not connected directly, each originating from a different terminus, but all of them are connected to the national network enabling transfers of rolling stock. The BHÉV is a hybrid between a commuter rail and a rapid transit. Although most of its stations are above ground and outdoor, two are located underground (Batthyány tér and Margit híd, budai hídfő).

== Rolling stock ==
The current BHÉV fleet consists of green-and-white MX and MXa electric multiple units (EMUs) built by LEW Henningsdorf of the former GDR, delivered between 1971 and 1983. The older MIXa series was fully retired in 2025, with only a few kept for nostalgia runs.

== Future ==
The BHÉV lines are planned to become integrated into the metro network. The Szentendre, Ráckeve and Csepel lines are slated to be merged into what is called the metro line 5 (North-South Regional rapid railway). The connection will be made by an underground line between the Kaszásdűlő and Lágymányosi bridge stations, and extended in order to reach the center of Pesterzsébet. The Urban and Suburban Transit Association (Városi és Elővárosi Közlekedési Egyesület) has presented a plan to merge line 2 with the HÉV from Gödöllő. The city government did not totally accept the plan, but it still may be built after 2021.

== Former lines ==
Logo used between 2011 and 2014

Today there are four (plus one branch line to Csömör) BHÉV lines in and around Budapest, although other HÉV lines around Budapest have existed in the past.

Now integrated to MÁV's (Hungarian State Railways) network:

- Esztergom HÉV (today suburban railway, since 1931 owned by Hungarian State Railways)
- Lajosmizse HÉV (suburban railway, a.k.a. Budapest-Tiszai HÉV, 1909)
- Vác–Budapest–Veresegyház–Gödöllő HÉV (partially abandoned, but the Vác–Veresegyház–Budapest line is still in operation)

Owned by the local tramway operators and abandoned or integrated to the actual tramway network:

- Budafok HÉV (today tram route 47; branch of Budapest-Budafok HÉV, owned by BKVT)
- Törökbálint HÉV (mostly demolished), the remaining line is tram no. 41
- Nagytétény HÉV line (from Budafok to Budatétény and Nagytétény; converted to tram line 43 in 1963, later withdrawn)

Withdrawn BHÉV lines:

- Pesterzsébet (converted to tramway and radically reduced)
- Rákosszentmihály (a line connected to Budapest-Gödöllő branch, replaced by bus)
- The BVKV (Budapestvidéki Közúti vasút – Budapest Suburban Tramway, owned by BKVT) is almost totally withdrawn and has been replaced by bus service, although the first stop has been converted to a tram stop.

Branch of Budapest-Szentlőrinci HÉV (owned by BLVV):

- Pestszentlőrinc line (now tram line 50)
- Kispest line (now tram line 42)

== See also ==
- List of Budapest HÉV stations
- Suburban trains in Budapest
