= Szilárd Németh =

Szilárd Németh may refer to:

- Szilárd Németh (footballer)
- Szilárd Németh (politician)
