= Rákosfalva =

Rákosfalva may refer to:

- Rákosfalva (Budapest), a neighbourhood in Budapest, Hungary
  - Rákosfalva station, a Budapest HÉV stations, Hungary
- Rákosfalva, the Hungarian name for Poiana Botizii village, Băiuț, Maramureș County, Romania
