= Budapest Cog-wheel Railway =

Rack railway in Budapest, Hungary

Coordinates: 47°30′44″N 19°01′08″E

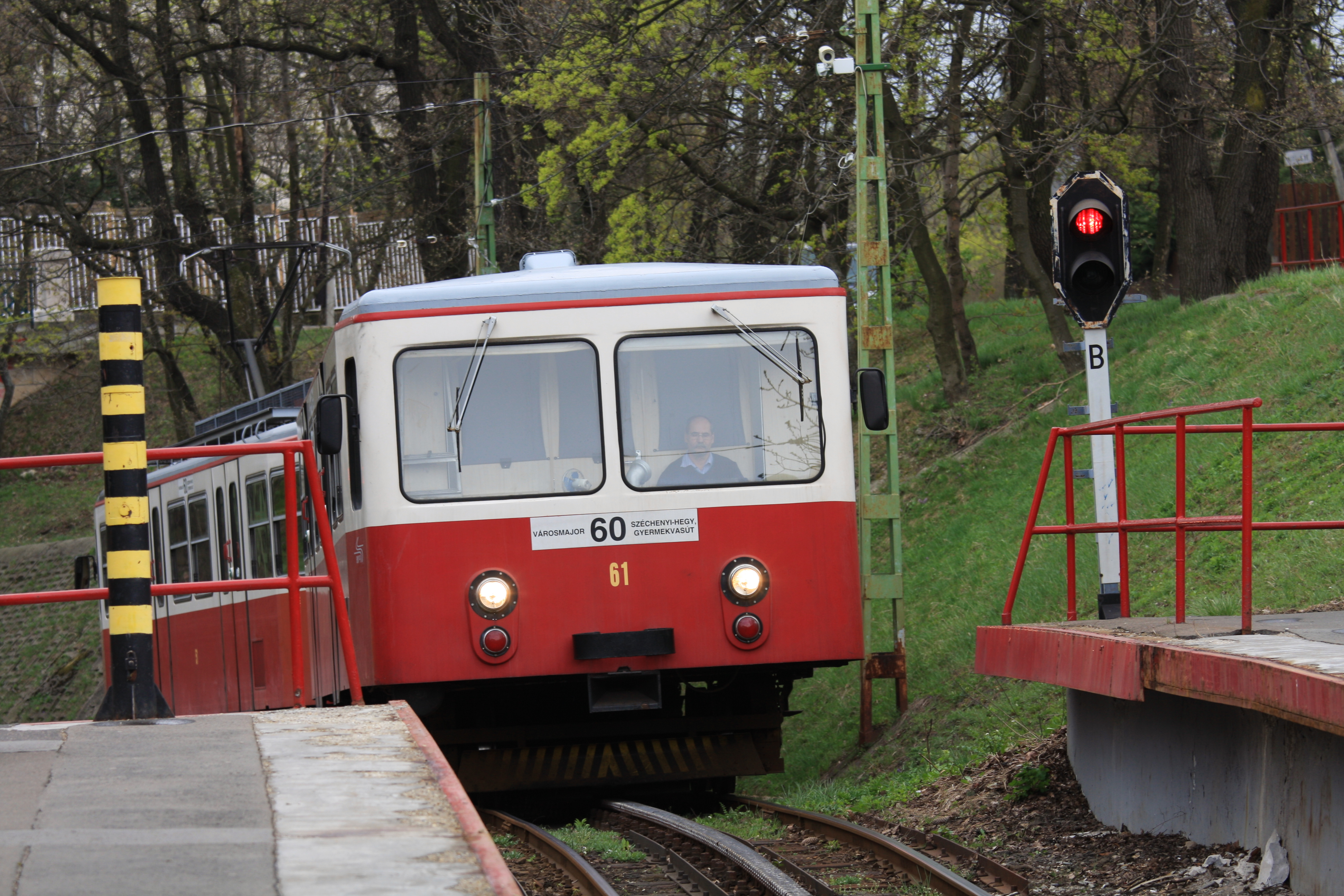
- Fogaskerekű going uphill

Overview
- Native name: Budapesti fogaskerekű vasút
- Line number: 60

Service
- Rolling stock: 7

Technical
- Line length: 3.7 km (2.3 mi)
- Rack system: Strub
- Track gauge: 1,435 mm (4 ft 8 1/2 in) standard gauge
- Electrification: 1,500 V DC
- Operating speed: uphill 30 km/h downhill 25 km/h

The Budapest Cog-wheel Railway (Hungarian: budapesti fogaskerekű vasút [ˈbudɒpɛʃti ˈfoɡɒʃkɛrɛkyː ˈvɒʃuːt]) is a rack railway in the Buda part of the Hungarian capital city of Budapest. It connects a lower terminus at Városmajor, two tram stops away from the Széll Kálmán tér transport interchange, with an upper terminus at Széchenyihegy. The line is integrated into the city's public transport system as tram line number 60, is 3.7 kilometres (2.3 mi) in length, and was opened in 1874.

The railway is operated by BKV, who also operate the city's tram and metro lines. It runs throughout the year between the hours of 0500 and 2300. As a fully integrated part of Budapest's public transport system, standard tickets and passes can be used.

The Városmajor terminus is adjacent to the Budapest tram stop of the same name, whilst the Széchenyihegy terminus is a 250-metre (820 ft) walk from the similarly named terminus of the Budapest Children's Railway.

== History ==
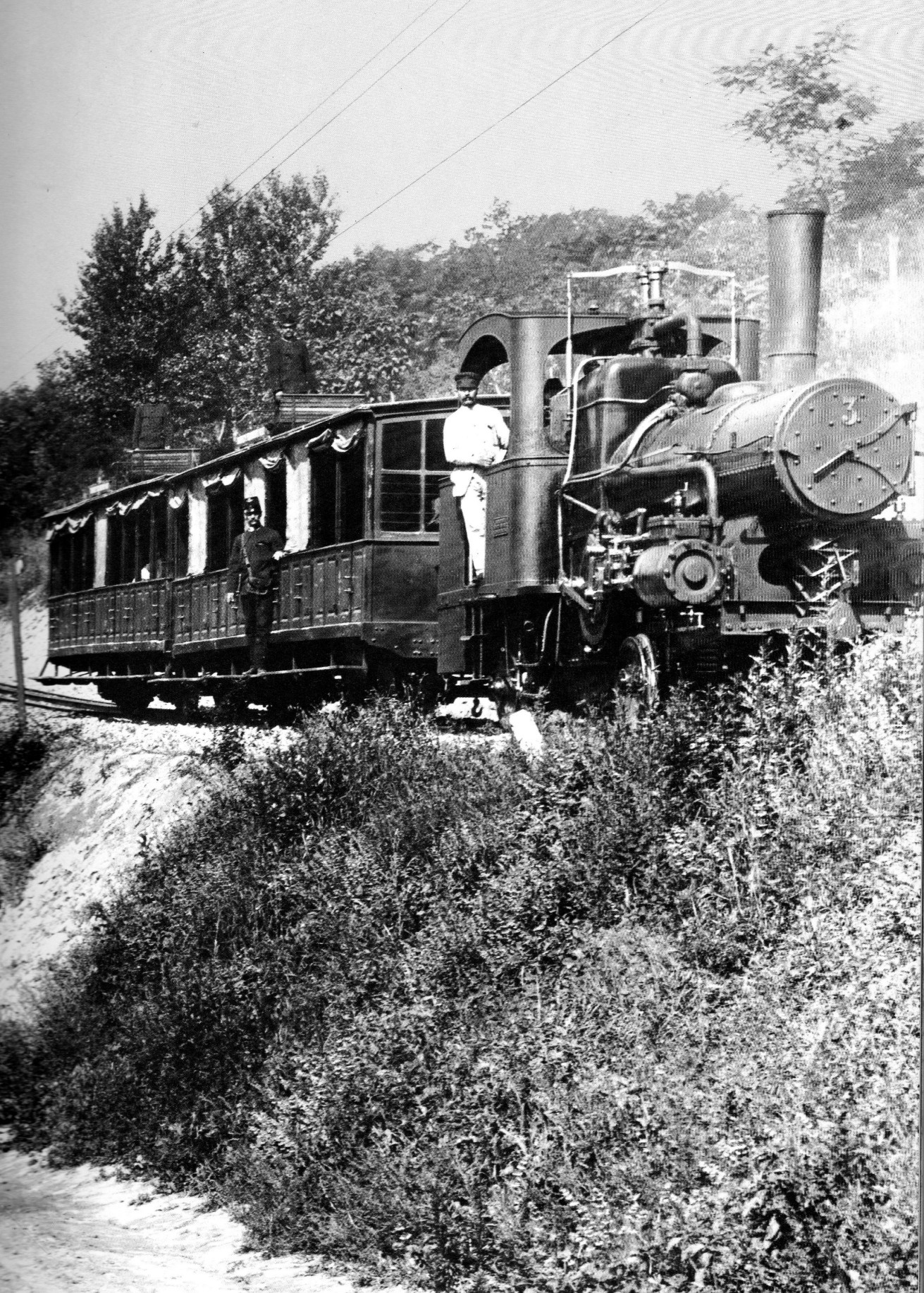
The old Cog-wheel Railway in 1896

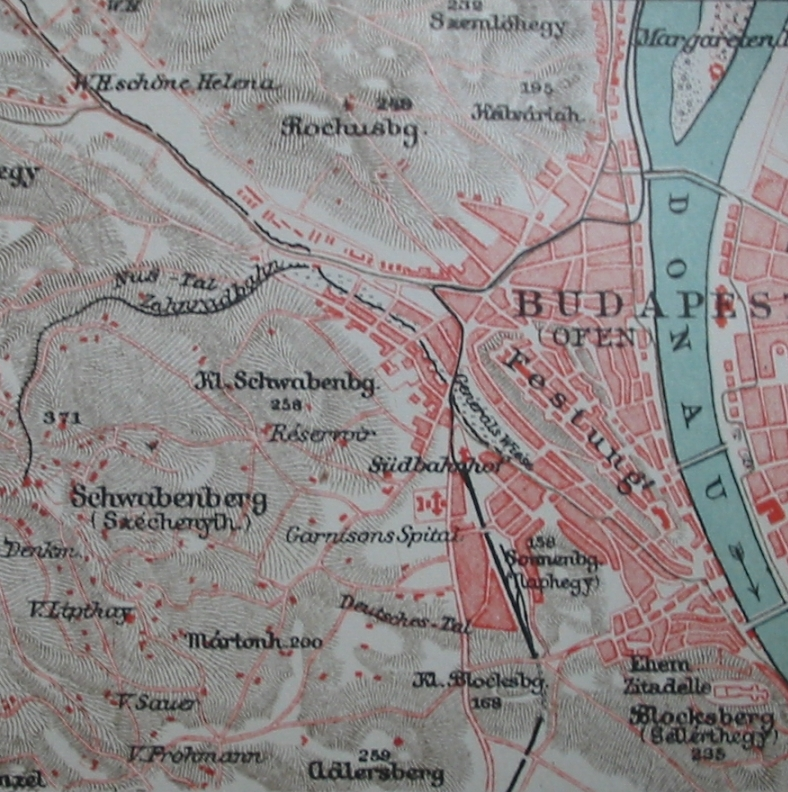
The Cog-wheel on the map of 1905 "Zahnradbahn"

Since 1868 a horse tramway ran on schedule from the Lánchíd to Zugliget set in operation by the Budai Közúti Vaspálya Társaság (~ Public Railway Society of Buda). Nikolaus Riggenbach (the designer of the Vitznau-Rigi railway, Europe's first rack railway that opened in 1871) and a colleague, as the representatives of the Internationale Gesellschaft für Bergbahnen, applied for the construction of a rack railway uphill from Városmajor to Svábhegy. Svábhegy was a popular excursion destination at the time, with many wealthy citizens of Pest-Buda having built holiday houses and villas there.

The building permit was issued on 3 July 1873, and construction of the line began immediately, thus enabling the service to start up in the following year. The first introductory vehicle ran from 4 p.m. on 24 June 1874, and regular traffic began on the following day. The whole line was of standard gauge, built according to Riggenbach's cog-wheel system, and was operated by steam locomotives pushing coaches uphill and hauling them downhill. The single track railway was 2.883 km (1.791 mi) long with a difference in elevation of 264 metres (866 ft).

Successful operation of the cog-wheel railway raised the issue of extending the line. The plan was brought to fruition in 1890, when traffic started to Széchenyihegy, increasing the length of the line to 3.7 kilometres (2.3 mi).

The municipal transportation company BSzKRt took over the railway in 1926. The new owners soon started to upgrade the line, by electrifying it using the same 550/600V DC system used by the city's trams, by adding new passing loops, replacing old trackage, and providing better schedules. New Rowan trains were built by SLM and Ganz, and the modernised operation started in 1929. From July 2, 1929, the new electrically powered vehicles ran every 15 minutes.

During and after World War II the line became very run down, and closure became a possibility. However this was averted, and in 1973 the line was completely rebuilt to celebrate the 100th anniversary of the merger of Buda, Pest and Óbuda into Budapest. The track was renewed using the Strub cog-wheel system, the line voltage was increased to 1,500V and new vehicles, built by SGP and BBC, introduced. The older trains last ran on 15 March 1973 and traffic using the new, and current, vehicles began on 20 August of the same year.

== Future developments ==
The Urban and Suburban Transit Association (VEKE) is advocating that the line be extended in both directions (Normafa and Széll Kálmán tér).

== Gallery ==
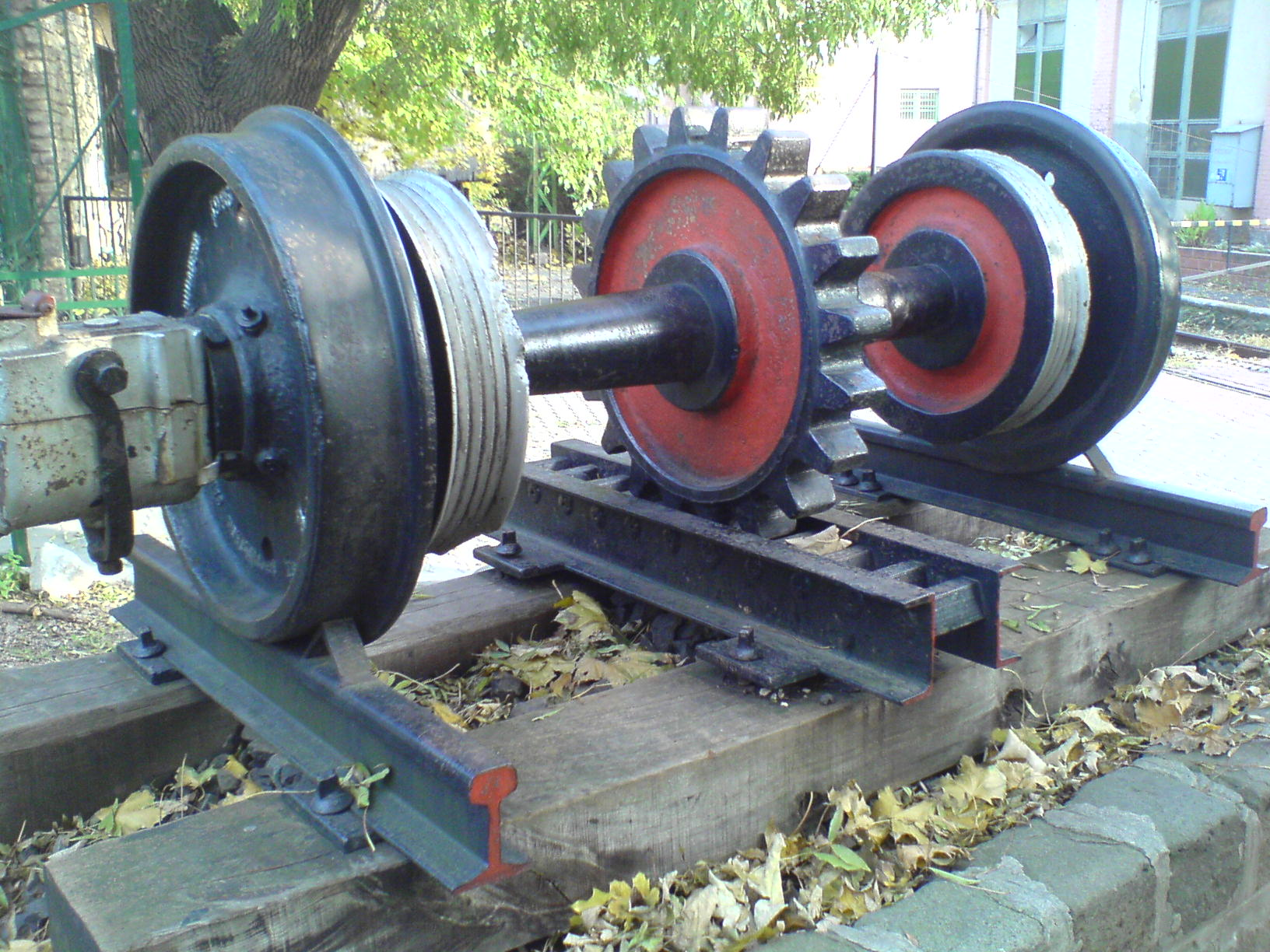
The Cog-wheel

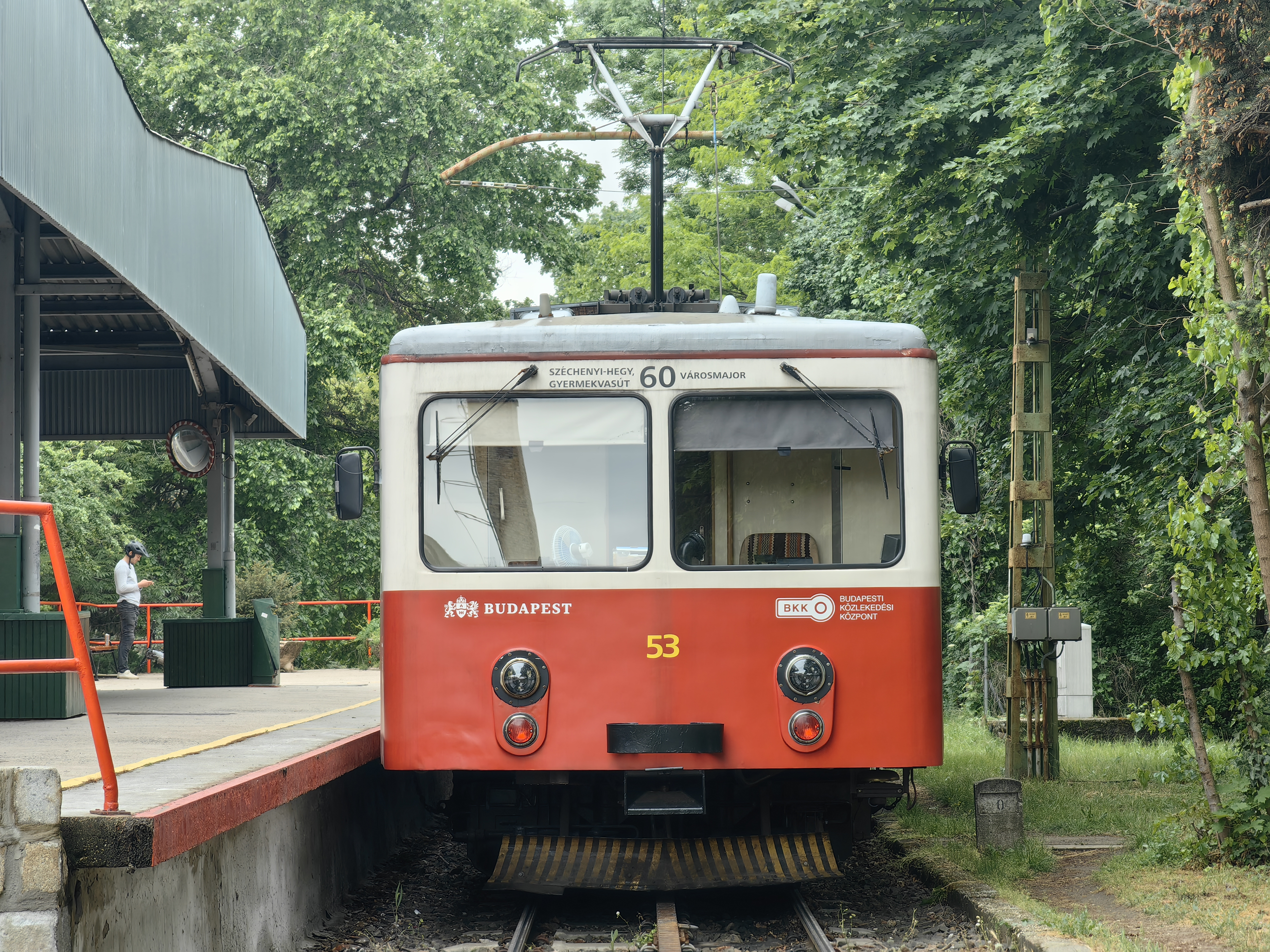
Simmering-Graz-Pauker multiple unit

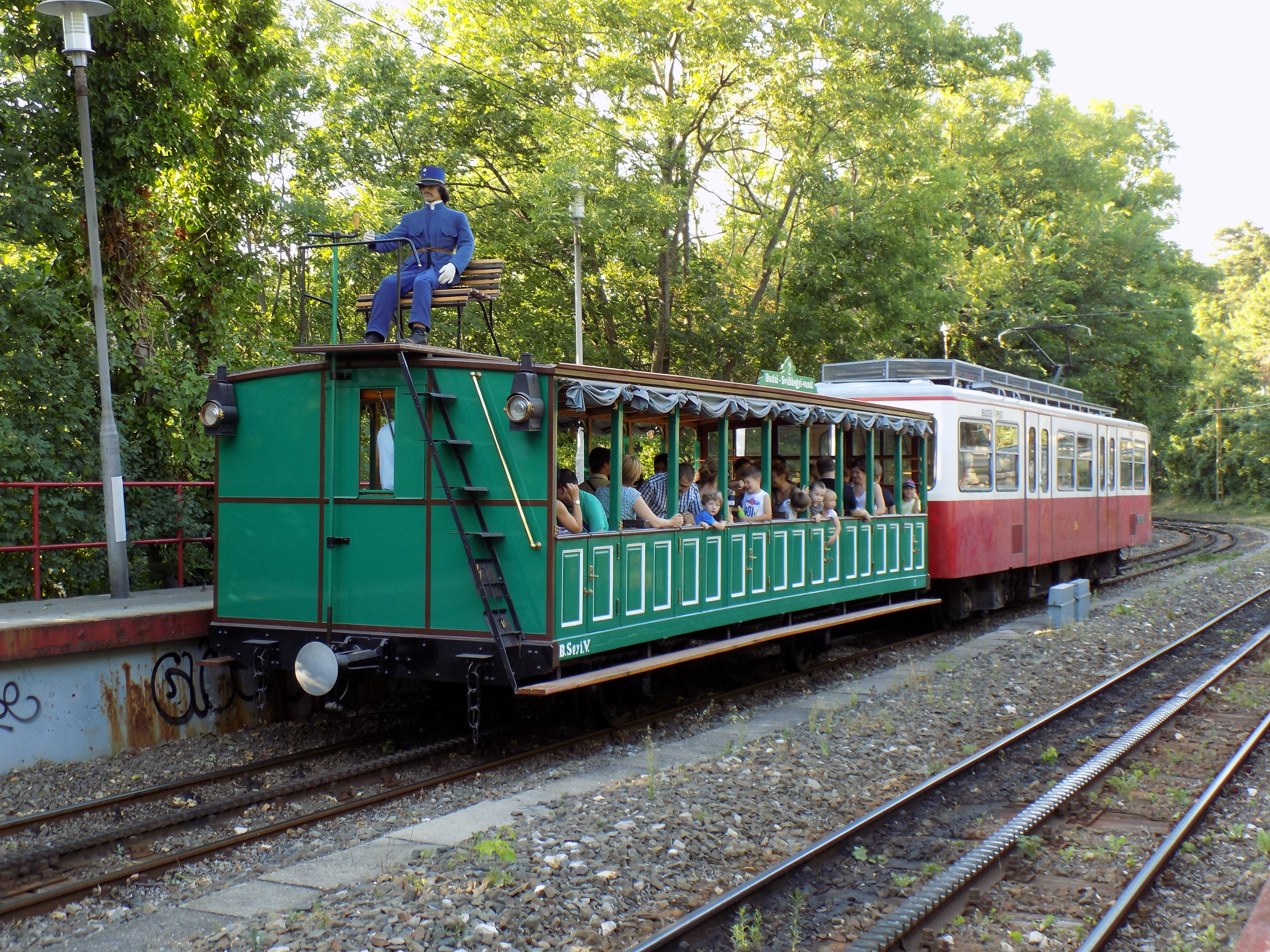
Heritage carriage in 2017
