= Urban and Suburban Transit Association =

The Urban and Suburban Transit Association (VEKE) (Hungarian: Városi és Elővárosi Közlekedési Egyesület) is a Hungarian non-profit organization, aimed at developing city transport in Hungary.

== Organizational structure ==
VEKE's headquarters are located in Budapest. Besides this main organization there exists two affiliated VEKE Érd-Diósd and Győr organizations. VEKE can only lobby in the cities where they have affiliated organizations. VEKE organizations are open for co-operation with the city governments, but they will always maintain their political neutrality and will always do their work on a non-profit basis.

== Workgroups ==
The members of VEKE participate in one of the two following workgroups:

- The Transport-developer workgroup does research on city transport and recommends means for improving the city's urban and suburban transport.
- The Transportoperation-history workgroup does historical research on the past of urban and suburban transport. They make commemorations, informative campaigns, and want to create a nostalgic depot in the future. In 2004 and 2005 they oversaw a nostalgic bus tour.

== VEKE's results so far ==
- November 1, 2003: Budapest tram line no. 41 was extended from Móricz Zsigmond körtér to Batthyány tér after the reconstruction of körter removed the old turnaround and did not allow line 41 to switch tracks in the new station due to the extensive traffic of the 47, 18, and 118 trams.
- July 1, 2005: Volánbusz lines to Érd got a new timetable (buses at nights and on weekends)
- July 4, 2005: Budapest bus line 112 was extended
- September 1, 2005: Reform of the night service in Budapest
- October 29, 2005: A new tram was introduced on the Budapest no. 52 tram line (TW 6000 trams from Hannover)
- December 3, 2005: Reform of the no. 7 bus family (7, fast 7, 73, 173)
- February 2006: Modifications in the parameter book of BKV (the BKV wanted to dissolve some bus lines)
- Spring 2006: Tram line no. 6's turnaround on Móricz Zsigmond körtér was removed due to noise reasons, and a new tram stop for the no. 6 was built.

VEKE presented some serious plans for further improvements of Budapest's city transport. Maybe the most important is the proposed uniting of the Gödöllő HÉV line and metro line 2. The city government did not totally agree with the plan (because of lack of money and because they think the present system is still working fine), but it still may be built after 2015.

Other plans include the extension of the cog railway of Budapest to Széll Kálmán tér and Normafa and the rebuilding of the tram lines between Thököly road and the Small Boulevard.

In 2020 VEKE proposed that the steel structure of Budapest's Chain Bridge should be rebuilt.

== See also ==
- HÉV
- Budapest Metro
