= List of Budapest HÉV stations =

This is a list of the stations of BHÉV, Budapest suburban railway system (Hu.: Budapesti Helyiérdekű Vasút) in and around the Hungarian capital.

Termini and interchange stations are in bold.

== H5 (Szentendrei HÉV) ==
Length: 21 km, running time: 38 min. Its downtown terminus is available with Metro 2. It runs northwards. Some of the trains go only as far as Békásmegyer station; it is marked on them clearly. Many places of particular interest are along this route, including the Roman Ruins in Aquincum, the thermal baths in Rómaifürdő, and the seasonal pumpkin festival in Szentendre.

- **Batthyány tér M**
- Margit híd, budai hídfő
- Szépvölgyi út
- Tímár utca
- Szentlélek tér (formerly: Árpád híd)
- Filatorigát
- Kaszásdűlő
- Aquincum
- Rómaifürdő (Roman Bath)
- Csillaghegy
- **Békásmegyer**
- Budakalász
- Budakalász, Lenfonó
- Szentistvántelep (Saint Stephen Estate)
- Pomáz
- Pannóniatelep (Pannonia Estate)
- **Szentendre**

== H6 (Ráckevei HÉV) ==
Length: 40 km, running time: 1 h 9-14 min. Its downtown terminus is available with the tram line 1 from the Népliget station of Metro 3. It runs southwards. Some stops are seasonal which means that only a few number of trains stop there.

- **Közvágóhíd**
- Kén utca
- Pesterzsébet felső (Upper Pesterzsébet)
- Torontál utca
- Soroksár felső (Upper Soroksár)
- Soroksár, Hősök tere (Soroksár, Heroes' Square)
- Szent István utca (Saint Stephen Street)
- Millenniumtelep (Millennium Estate)
- Dunaharaszti felső (Upper Dunaharaszti)
- **Dunaharaszti külső** (Outer Dunaharaszti)
- Szigetszentmiklós
- József Attila-telep (Attila József Estate)
- Szigetszentmiklós alsó (Lower Szigetszentmiklós)
- Szigetszentmiklós, Gyártelep (Szigetszentmiklós-Works)
- Szigethalom
- Szigethalom alsó (Lower Szigethalom)
- **Tököl**
- Szigetcsép
- Egyetemi Tangazdaság (seasonal)
- Szigetszentmárton-Szigetújfalu
- Horgásztanyák (seasonal)
- Angyalisziget (seasonal)
- **Ráckeve**

== H7 (Csepeli HÉV) ==
Length: 7 km; running time: 13 min. Its downtown terminus is available with the 4 or 6 tram from Corvin-negyed station of Metro 3. It runs southwards.

- **Boráros tér**
- Müpa – Nemzeti Színház (Müpa – National Theatre; formerly: Lágymányosi híd and Közvágóhíd)
- Szabadkikötő (Free Port)
- Szent Imre tér (Saint Emeric Square)
- Karácsony Sándor utca
- **Csepel**

== H8-9 ==
=== H8 (Gödöllői HÉV) ===
This line goes to Gödöllő on a length of 46 minutes and 26 kilometers. Many places of interest are accessible via this line, including the palace in Gödöllő and the water park at Mogyoród. It is accessible from the city via Metro 2, which has its terminus on Örs vezér tere as well.

- **Örs vezér tere M**
- Rákosfalva
- Nagyicce
- Sashalom (Eagle Mound)
- Mátyásföld, repülőtér (Matthiasfield-Airport)
- Mátyásföld, Imre utca (Matthiasfield-Emeric Street)
- Mátyásföld alsó (Lower Matthiasfield)
- **Cinkota**
- Ilonatelep
- Kistarcsa, kórház (Hospital)
- Kistarcsa
- Zsófialiget
- Kerepes
- Szilasliget
- Mogyoród
- Szentjakab
- Gödöllő, Erzsébet park (Elisaberth Park)
- Gödöllő, Szabadság tér (Liberty Square)
- Gödöllő, Palotakert (Palace Garden)
- **Gödöllő**

=== H9 (Csömöri HÉV) ===
This railway is a branch of the Gödöllői HÉV. Its length is 11 km, running time is 23-24 min. Although not many in number, but some places of interest are accessible via this line, like the swimming pool in Mátyásföld. It is accessible via the Metro 2, which shares the terminus in Budapest with it (Örs vezér tere). There is a connection between the terminus in Csömör and the first stop in Kistarcsa in case of emergency.

- **Örs vezér tere M**
- Rákosfalva
- Nagyicce
- Sashalom
- Mátyásföld, repülőtér
- Mátyásföld, Imre utca
- Mátyásföld alsó
- **Cinkota**
- Cinkota alsó
- Árpádföld (Árpádfield)
- Szabadságtelep (Liberty Estate)
- **Csömör**

== The planned connector line, M5 ==
A planned suburban railways' connector line, known as M5, or Észak-déli Regionális Gyorsvasút in Hungarian ("North-South Regional Rapid Railway") will replace and connect the lines of the existing HÉV lines between Szentendre, Csepel and Ráckeve, through Budapest downtown, making the present Szentendrei HÉV and Ráckevei HÉV redundant. It will also provide connection for the railway stations in the city.

See also Metro 5, List of M5 metro stations

== See also ==
- BHÉV
- List of Budapest metro stations
