= Lénárd Borbély =

Hungarian politician

Mayor of Csepel District XXI, Budapest
- Incumbent
- Assumed office 12 October 2014
- Preceded by: Szilárd Németh

Member of the National Assembly
- In office 14 May 2010 – 5 May 2014

Personal details
- Born: 5 August 1981 (age 44) Oradea, Romania
- Party: Fidesz (until 2024)
- Profession: politician

Lénárd Borbély (born 5 August 1981) is a Hungarian politician, member of the National Assembly (MP) for Csepel (Budapest Constituency XXX) between 2010 and 2014. He was a member of the Defence and Internal Security Committee since 17 May 2010.

Borbély was elected Mayor of Csepel (District XXI, Budapest) during the 2014 local elections, replacing fellow Fidesz member Szilárd Németh.

Political offices
Preceded by Szilárd Németh	Mayor of Csepel; 2014–	Succeeded by Incumbent
