= Jedlik Ányos Gymnasium =

School in Budapest, Hungary

Coordinates: 47.425364°N 19.072363°E

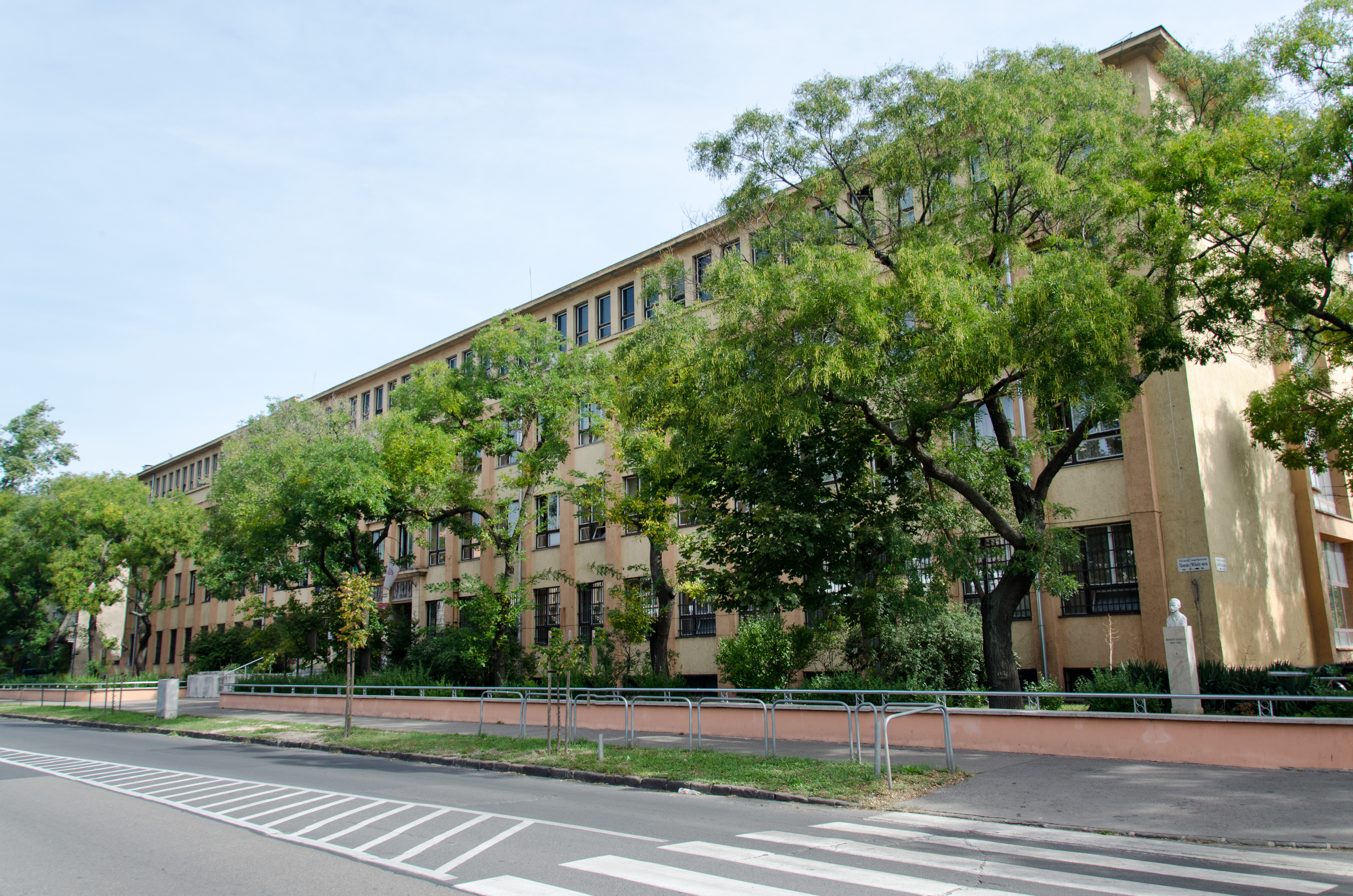
The building

The Jedlik Ányos Gymnasium (Hungarian: Jedlik Ányos Gimnázium) is a high school in Csepel, Budapest, Hungary.

== History ==
The gymnasium was founded in the summer of 1946 at the request of local parents. It was first run by the Order of Saint Benedict from Pannonhalma, but they left the institution in the same year. It school was the first co-educational religious school in the country, which got foundation from the state as well. The school's current building was built in 1952. The most famous teacher of the school was Miklós Vermes.
