= Line H7 (Budapest HÉV) =

Overview
- Line number: H7

Technical
- Line length: 6.7 km (4.2 mi)
- Track gauge: 1,435 mm (4 ft 8 1/2 in)
- Electrification: 1000 volts DC
Route map

H7 (in former name Csepeli HÉV) is a rapid transit line in Budapest, Hungary. It connects the city centre Grand Boulevard (Boráros Square) and Csepel (former suburb, now part of Greater Budapest). The line was built in 1951.

== Gallery ==
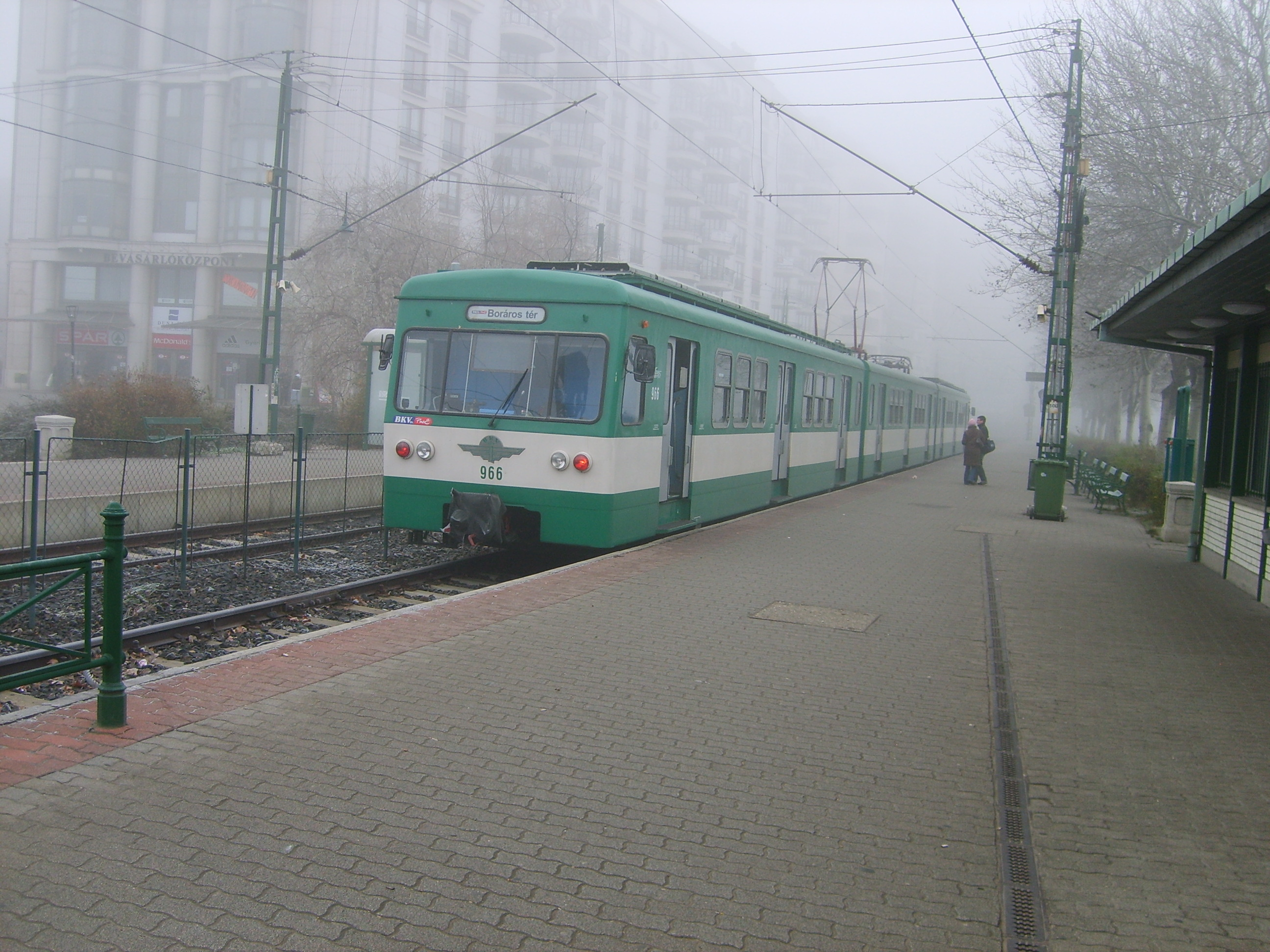
Boráros Square station

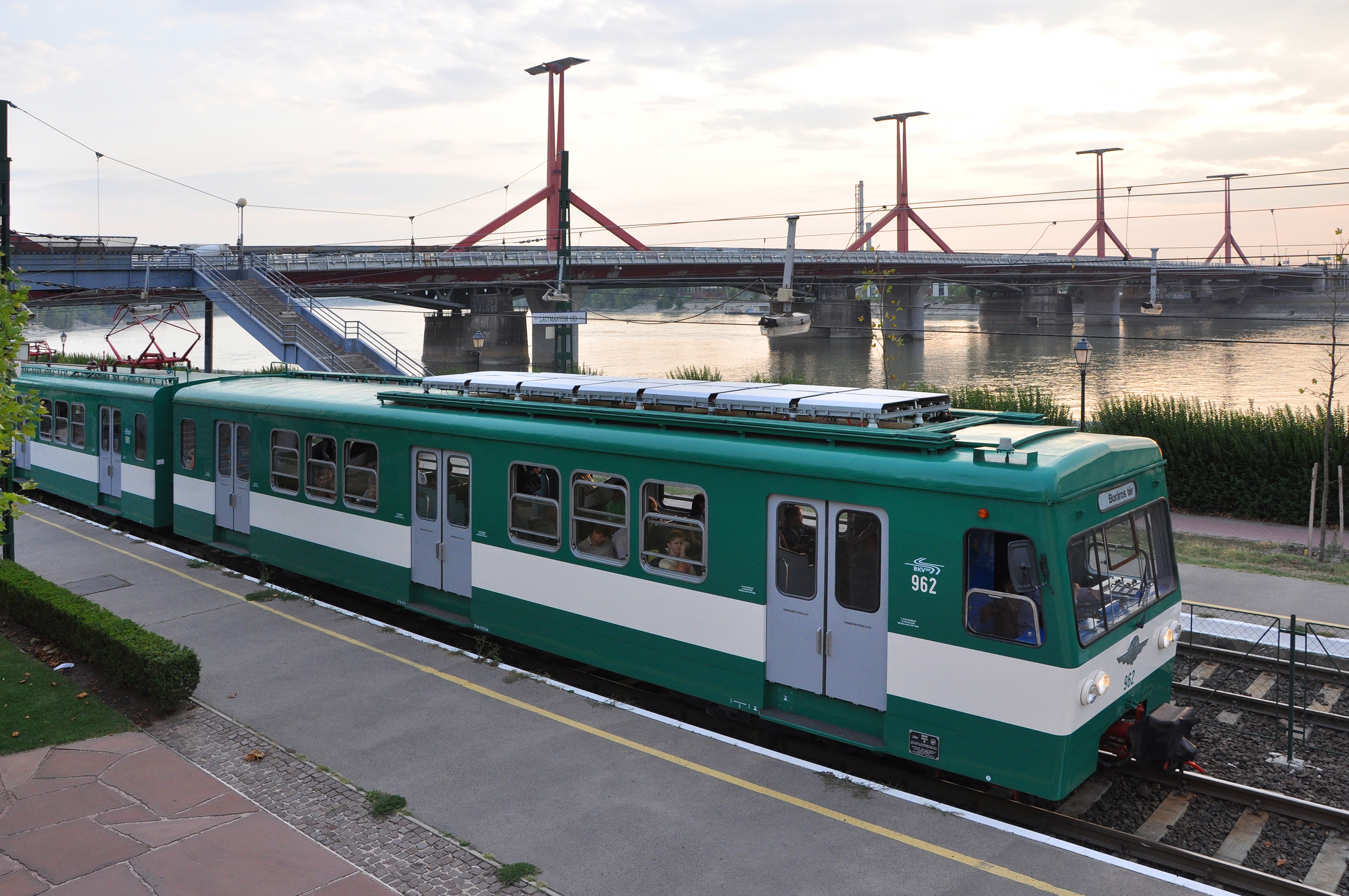
Müpa–Nemzeti Színház stop

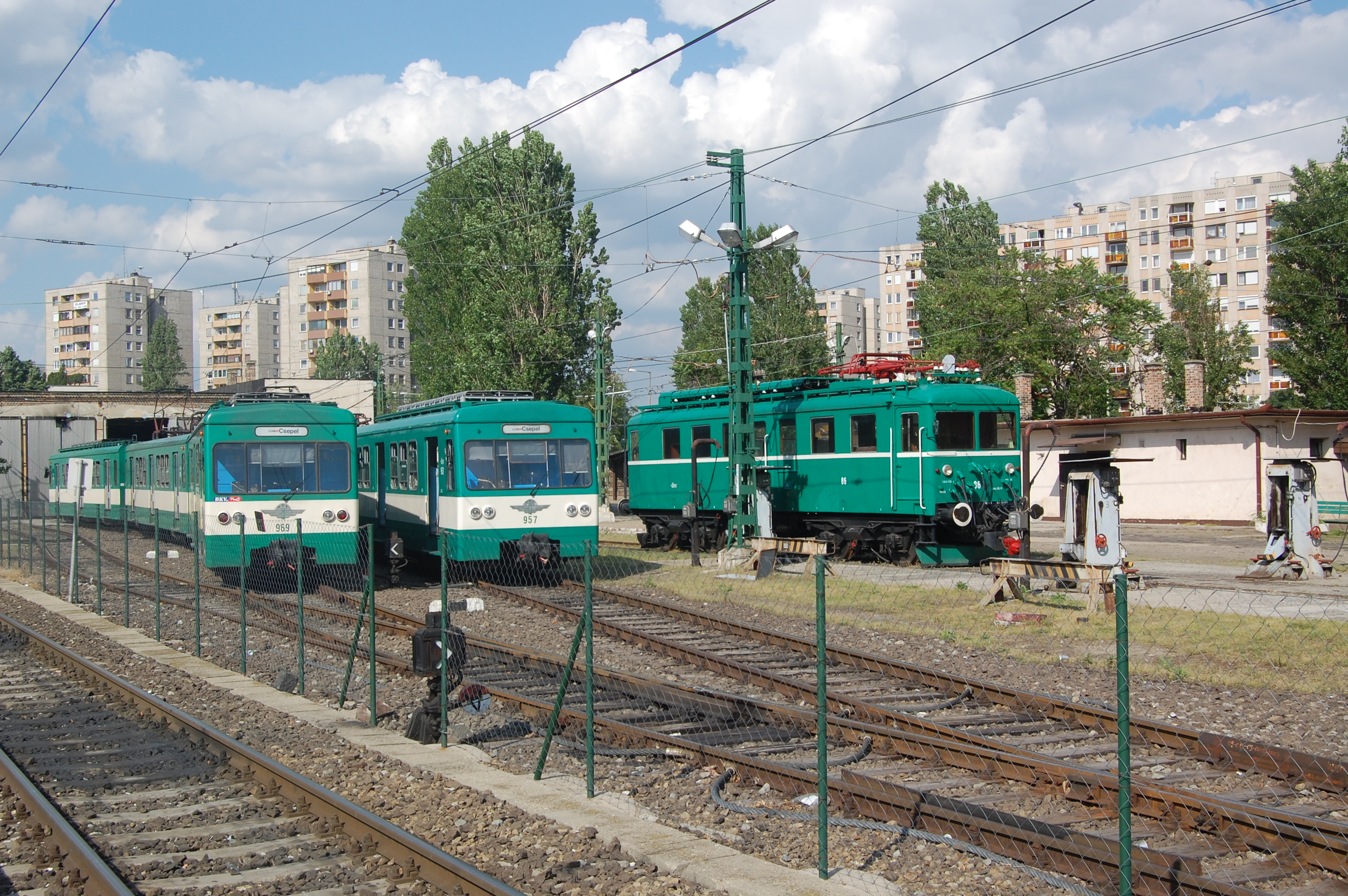
GDR built trains in Csepel yard
