= National Theatre (Budapest) =

Theatre in Budapest, Hungary

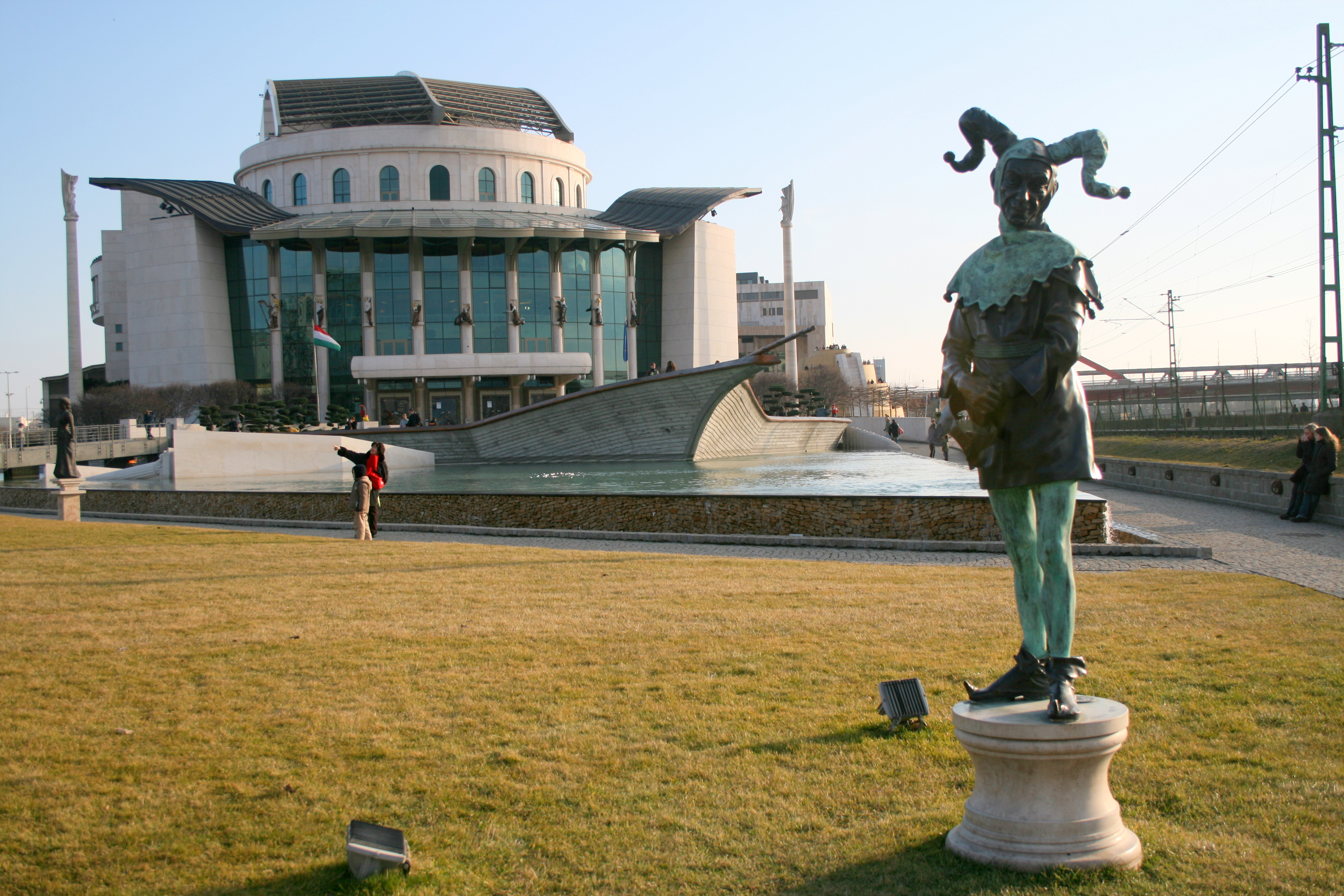
- Interactive map of National Theatre
- Address: Bajor Gizi park 1.
- Location: Budapest, Hungary
- Coordinates: 47°28′15.89″N 19°4′14.04″E
- Capacity: 619
- Type: Theatre, Performing arts center

Construction
- Built: 2002
- Opened: (1837) 2002

Website
- nemzetiszinhaz.hu

The National Theatre, located in Budapest originally opened in 1837. Since then, it has occupied several locations, including the original building at Kerepesi Street, the People's Theatre at Blaha Lujza Square, as well as Hevesi Sándor Square, its longest temporary location. It currently occupies the National Theatre building, which opened March 15, 2002.

== History ==
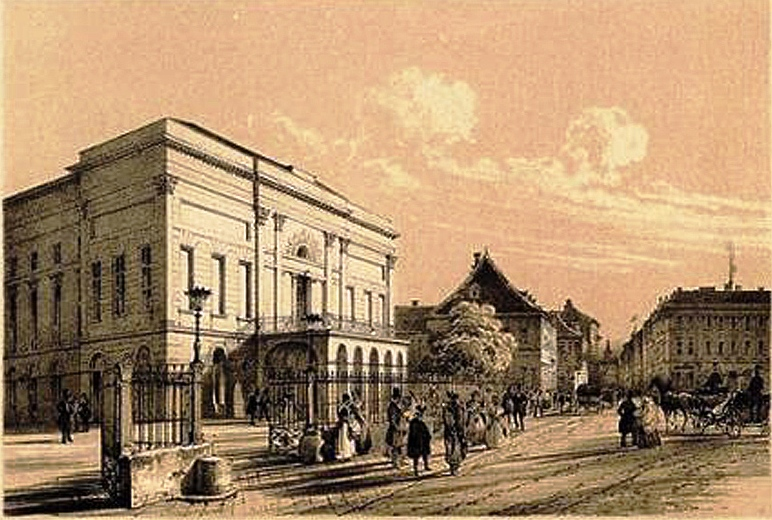
The original building at Kerepesi Street

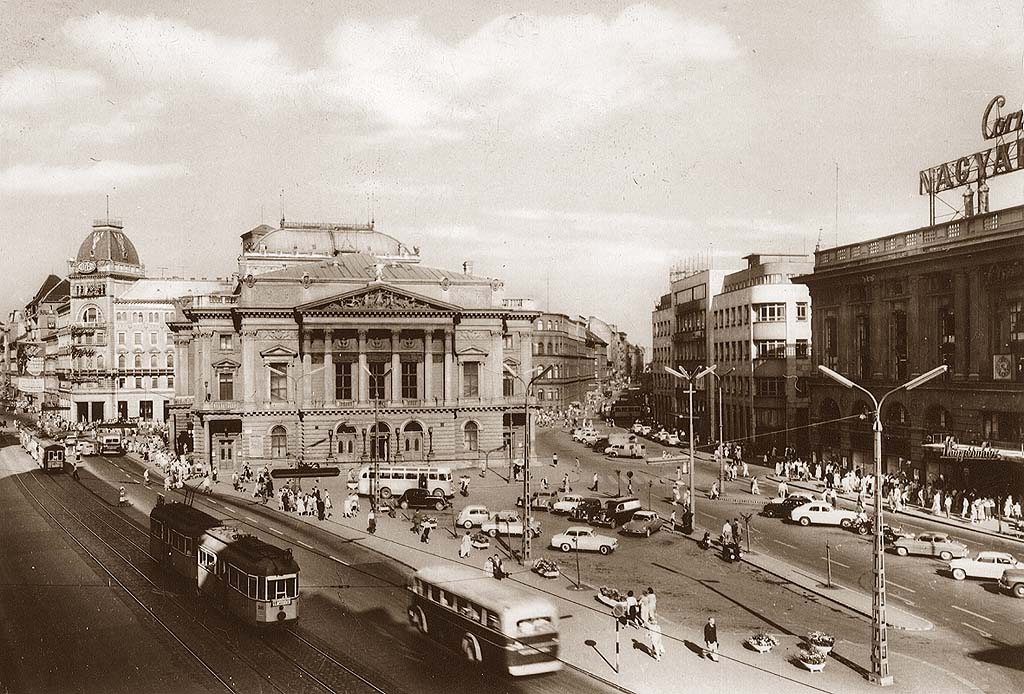
The People's Theatre, before its demolition

The concept of a national theatre in Budapest was born at the turn of the 18th-19th century, promoted by influential thinkers including Ferenc Kazinczy and Baron István Széchenyi. Széchenyi was a major figure in Hungary's reform. He dreamed of a great building on the bank of the Danube that would operate in the form of a joint-stock company. He proposed his plans in his 1832 pamphlet, A Magyar Játékszínről.

The Hungarian Parliament made the decision to move forward with a national theatre in its 41st article of 1836. Led by Antal Grassalkovich, construction began in 1835 on Kerepesi Street. With a company assembled in the previous four years by András Fáy and Gábor Döbrentei (playing in the Court Theatre of Buda), the theatre opened on August 22, 1837, under the name Pesti Magyar Színház (Hungarian Theatre of Pest). Its goals were to give birth to the national drama and to showcase classics of world literature. Nationalized in 1840, the name was changed to the National Theatre, which it still holds today.

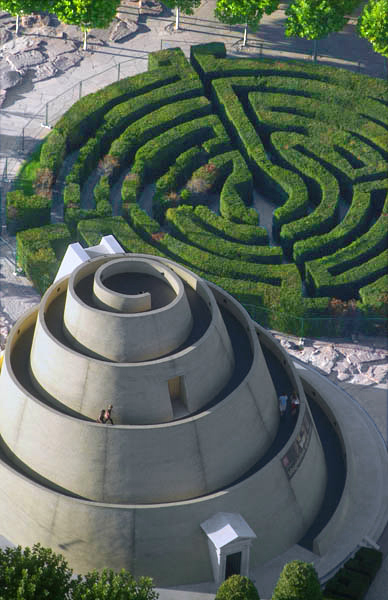
Aerial photography of the Park

The National Theatre building was demolished in the 1900s. The company moved to the People's Theatre at Blaha Lujza Square in 1908. In the following decades, the company was only a tenant of People's Theatre, and the building's state continually deteriorated. In 1963, authorities decided to demolish it, citing metro line construction as the reasoning. Operation ceased one year later, and the building was demolished on April 23, 1965. The company transferred to the renovated Petőfi Theatre (today is known as Thália), in Nagymező Street. Two years later, it relocated again to the former Magyar Theatre in Hevesi Sándor Square.

After the demolition of the People's Theatre, a proposal was made to build the new theater in the City Park, at Felvonulási Square. An international design contest for the new theatre was held in 1965. No first place prize was awarded, and instead the second place prize was shared between the plans of Miklós Hofer and Jan Bogusławski - Bohdan Golebiewski. The planning, led by Hofer, stretched on for the better part of two decades. The building permit was finally granted in 1985, but the construction work went no further than chopping down a few trees. In 1988, a tender was held for a new location and Engels Square (today Erzsébet Square) was chosen. Another decade passed without any progress. In 1996, Parliament agreed to move on to the next phase. However, the project was delayed again due to political quarrels over the next several years. The project resumed again with architect Ferenc Bán being declared the winner, but the newly elected government stopped the work, finding it too costly.

In 1999, ministry commissioner György Schwajda commissioned Mária Siklós to make plans for a building at a new location Essenza, the bank of the Danube. This decision was met with anger from the Hungarian architect community, and a bid was held. György Vadász's won the bid. He did not modify Siklós's plans further, and construction began with Siklós's plans on September 14, 2000. The new National Theatre opened on March 15, 2002, Hungary's National Day.

== The New National Theatre ==
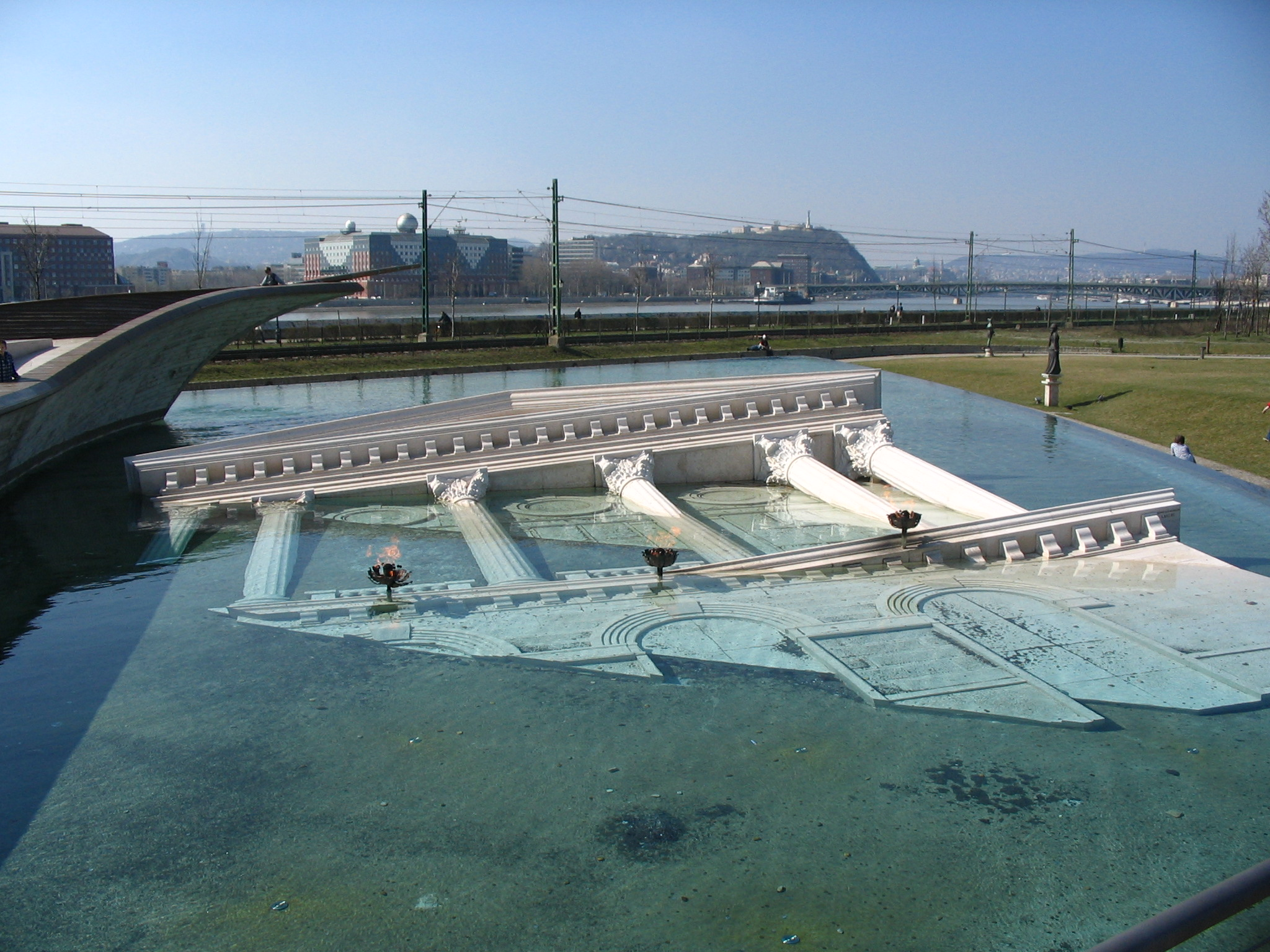
Memorial of the Old National Theatre in the Park

The new National Theatre is on the bank of the Danube in the Ferencváros district, situated on Soroksári road, Grand Boulevard, and Rákóczi Bridge. It is a five minute walk from the Csepel HÉV (suburban railway). The Memorial of the Old National Theatre is located on the National Theatre grounds.

The theatre is 20,844 square meters (224,362.95 square feet), including an open-air stage. Functionally, it can be separated into three parts:

1. The central unit, including the rounded auditorium and studio stage;
2. The gangways, public areas, and horseshoe-shaped servicing areas;
3. The surrounding park, which contains numerous memorials commemorating the Hungarian drama and film industry.

The nearby Palace of Arts was opened in 2005.

== Park ==
Statues

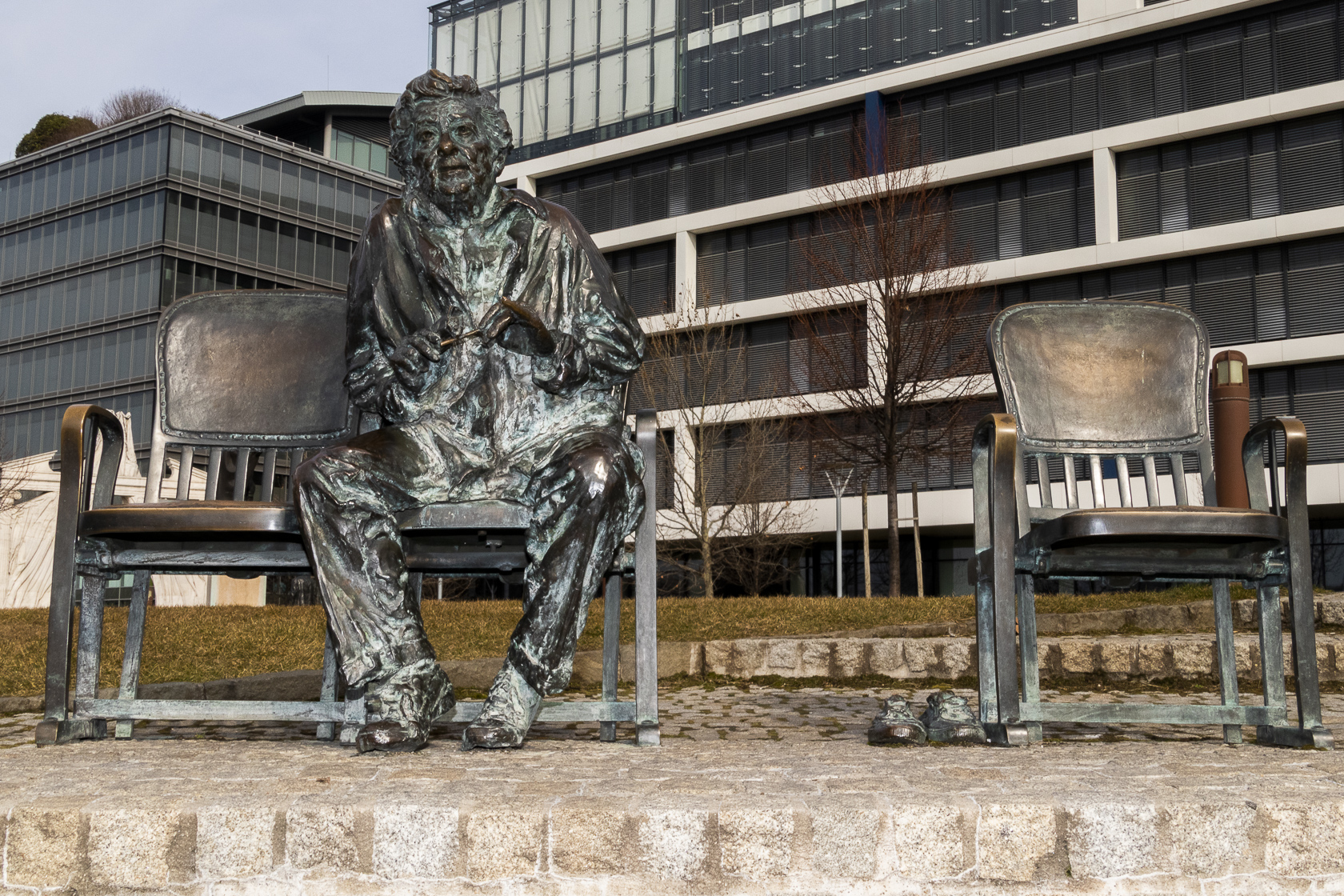
Gobbi Hilda

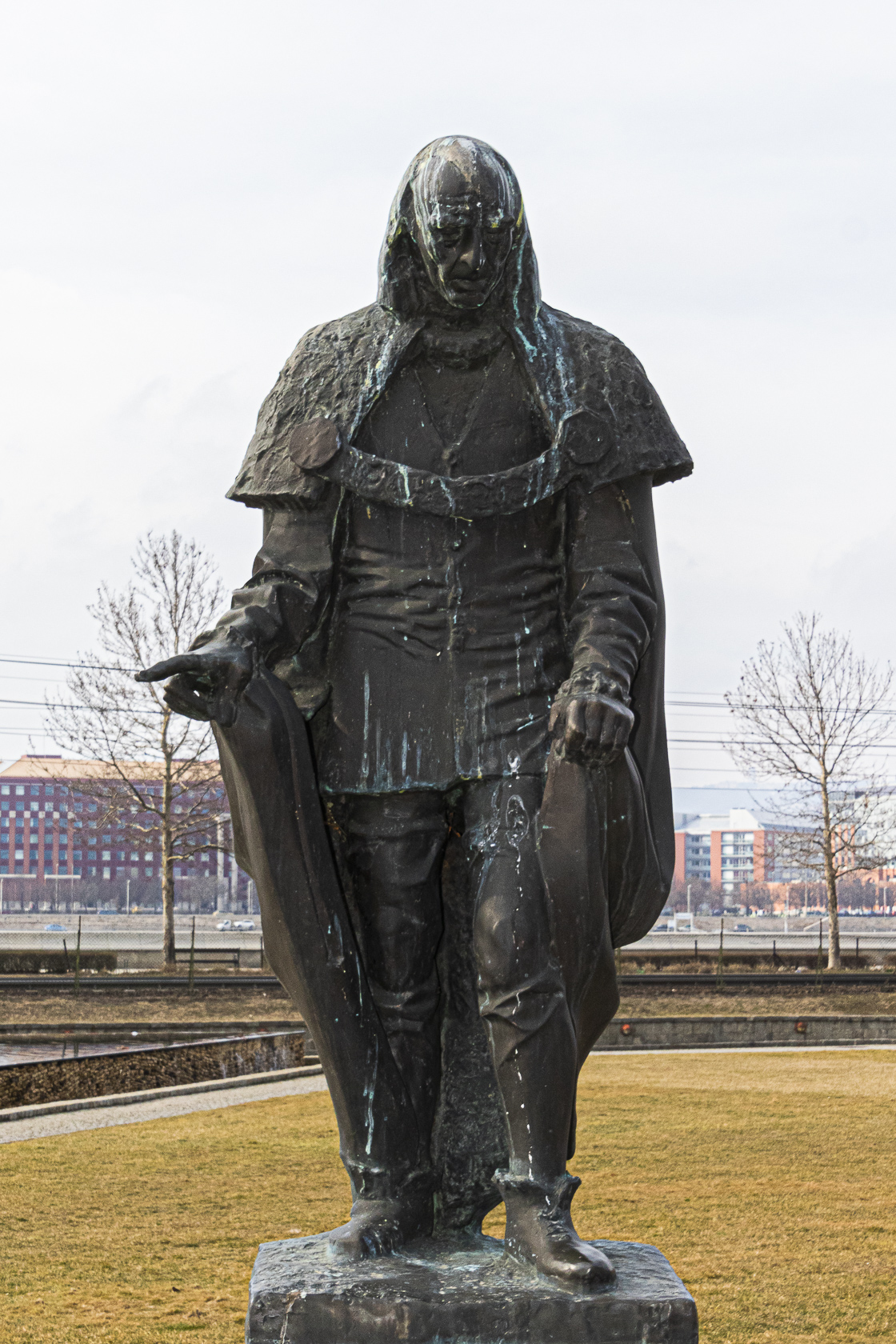
Major Tamás

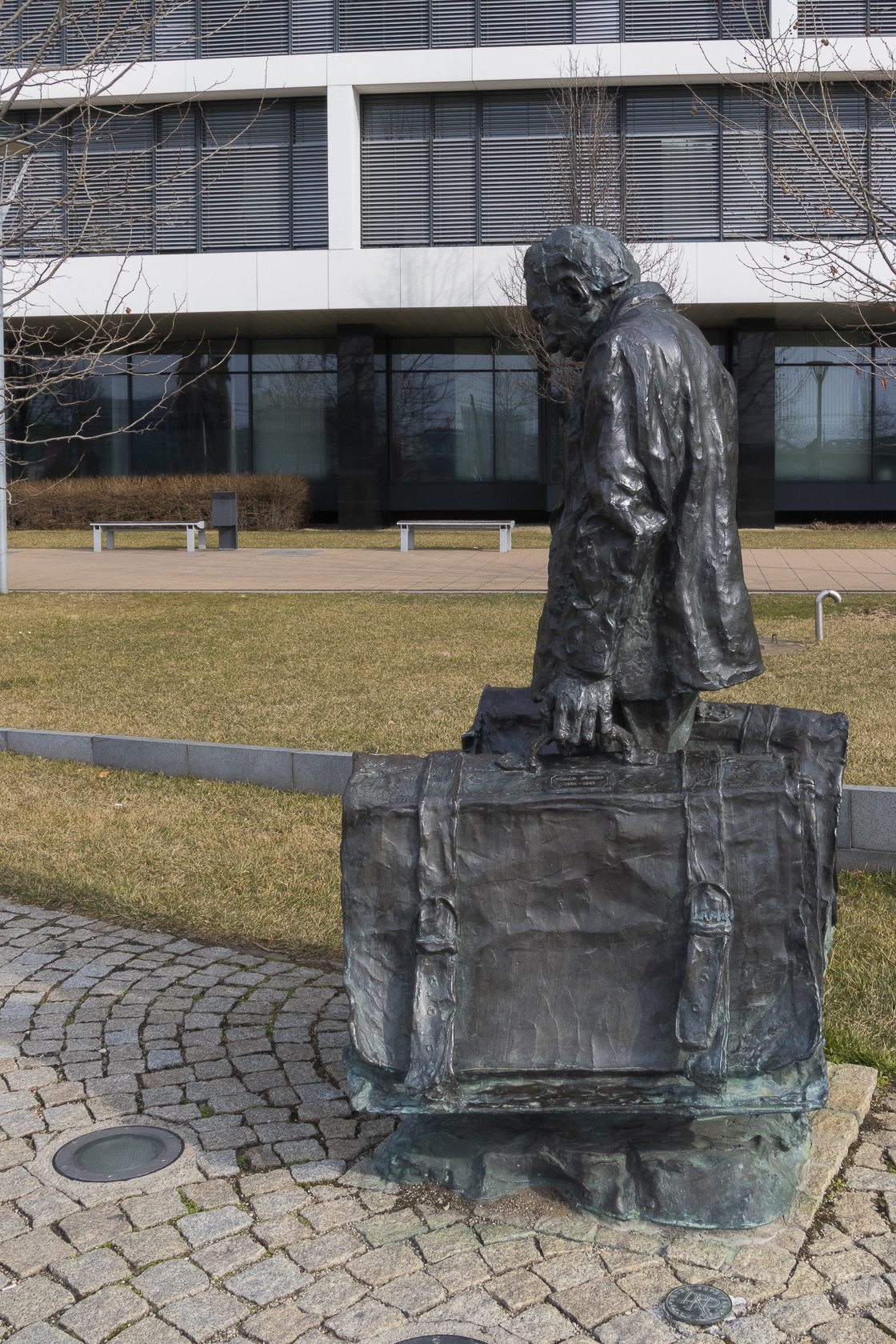
Tímár József

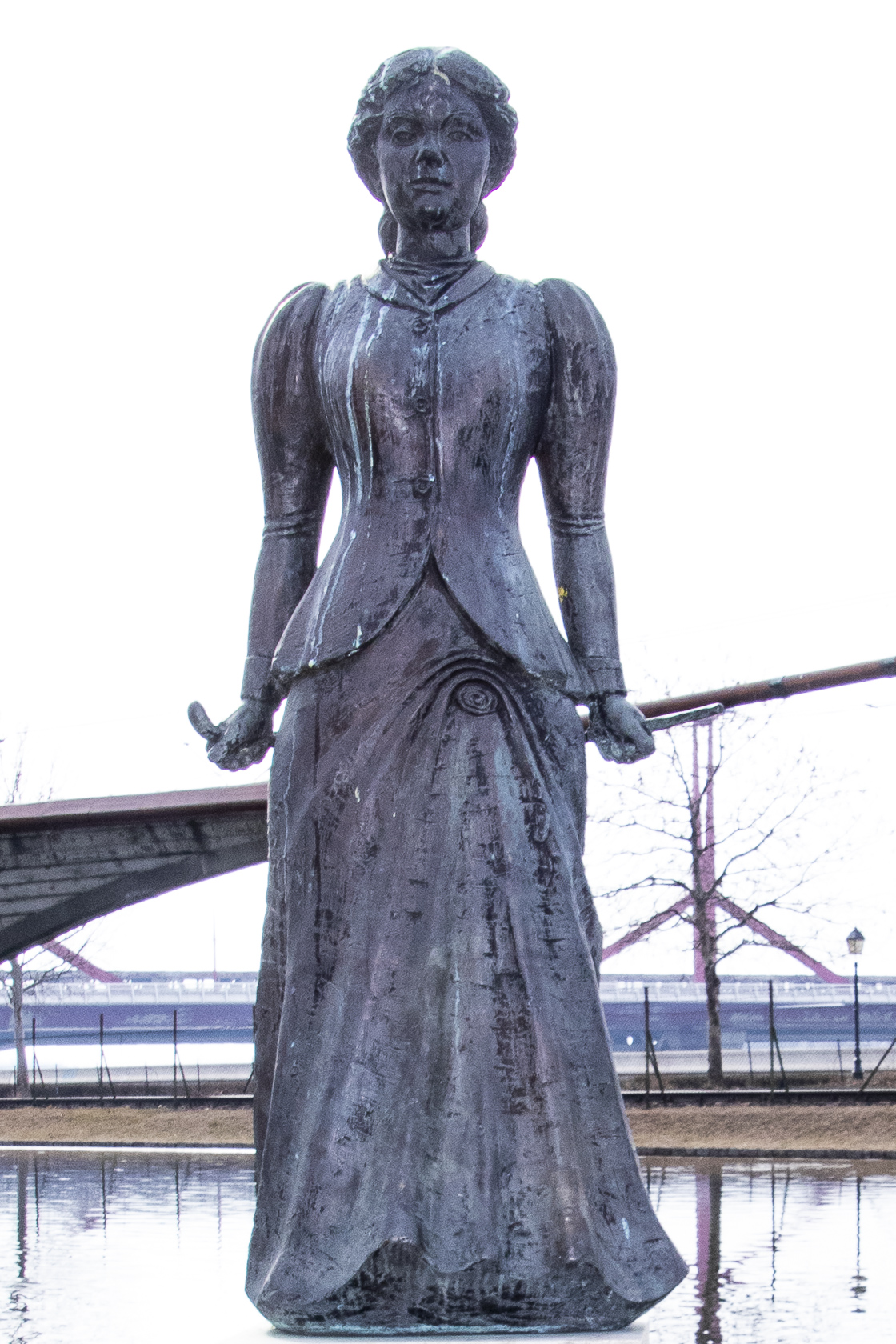
Ruttkai Éva

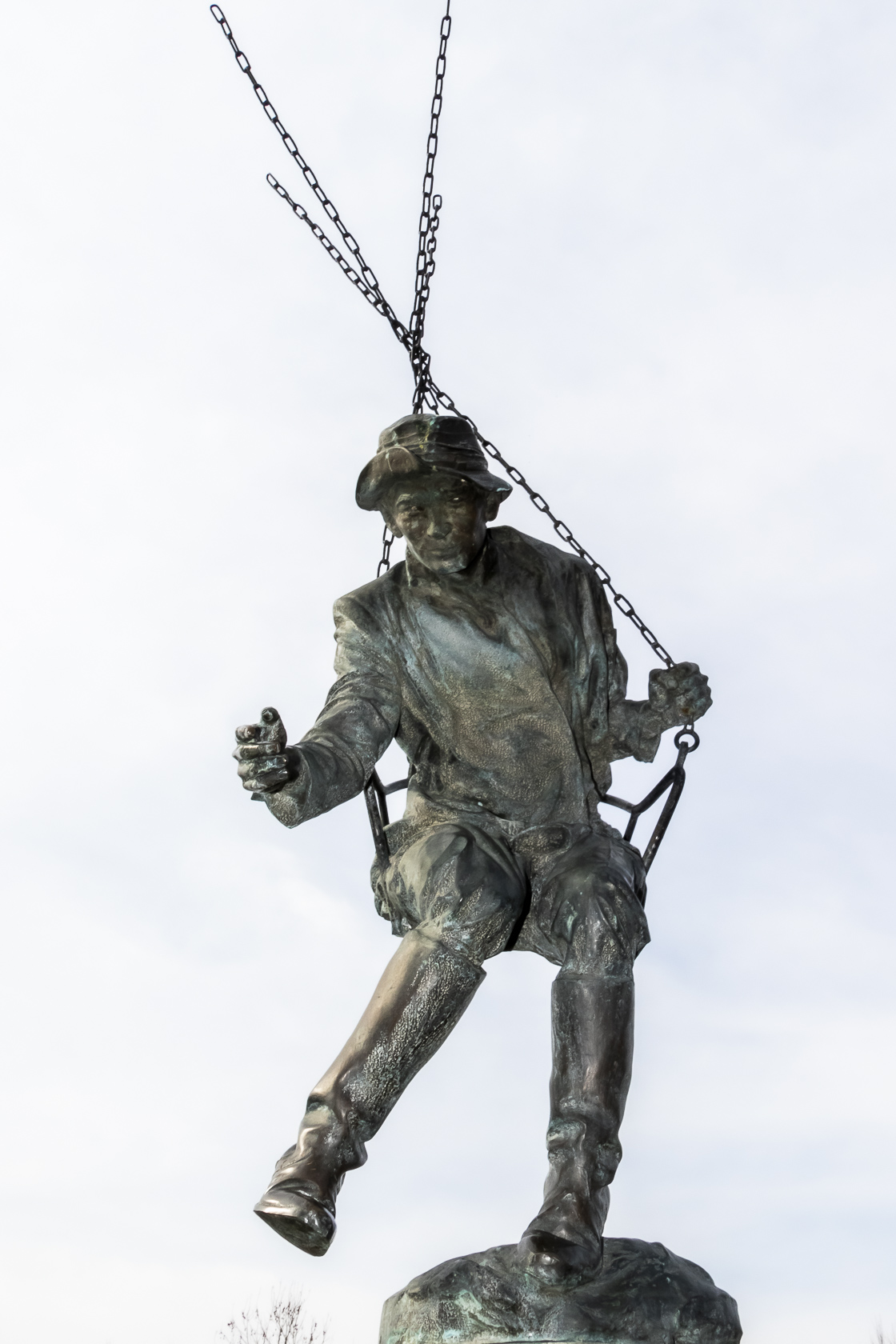
Soós Imre

=== Directors ===
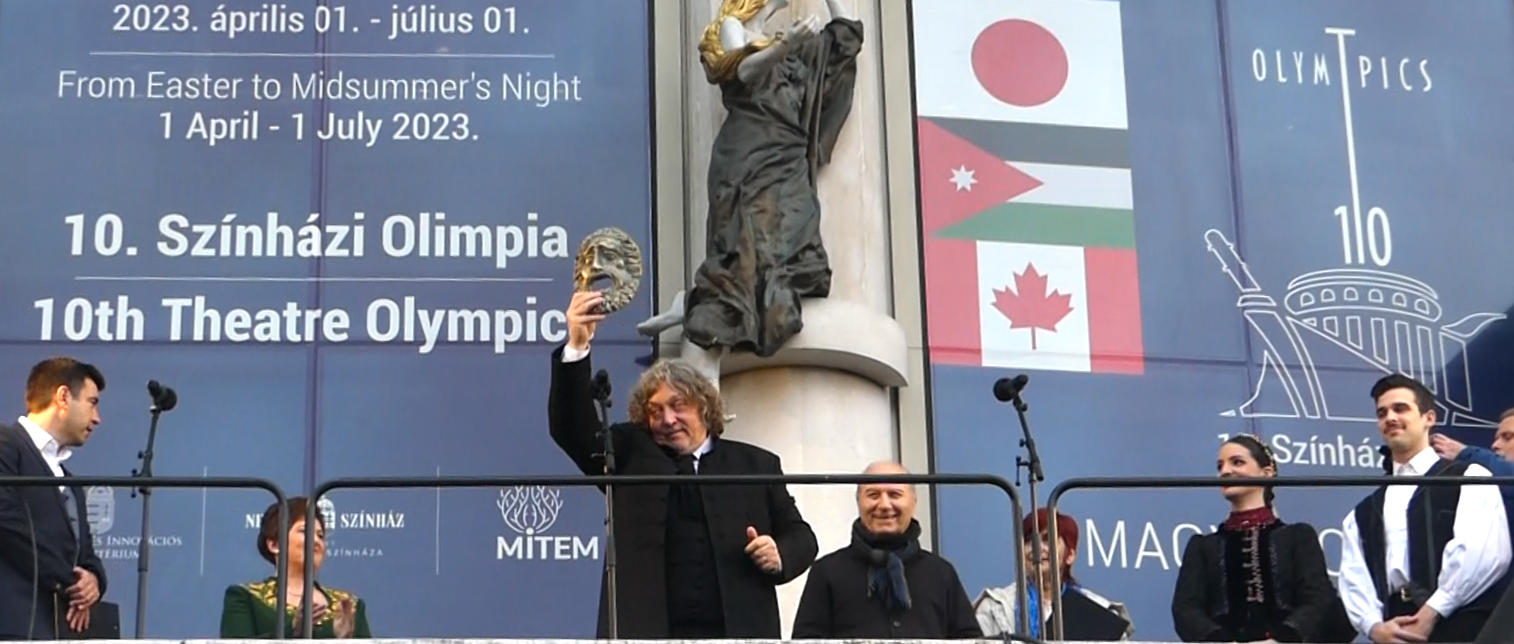
Director Attila Vidnyánszky opening the 10th Theatre Olympics

György Schwajda became the first director of the theater. He signed the "company's core" and founded the title Actor of the Nation with a financial reward. He resigned in the summer of 2002. After his resignation, Tamás Jordán won the bid to become the new director. He organized the public from the countryside and debuted the many counties of Hungary on stage. Jordan stepped down in 2008 and Róbert Alföldi took over. Where Jordán advocated support for the nation-rearing, folk theatre, Alföldi opposed its efforts.

In 2013, Attila Vidnyanszky was appointed to lead the National Theater for a ten-year term, which was subsequently extended until 2028. In 2023, he offered to resign after two actors were injured after falling off a balcony during a production of Romeo and Juliet, but his resignation was rejected by culture minister János Csák.
