= Normafa =

Tourist site in Hungary

Coordinates: 47°30′9.98″N 18°57′58.44″E

Normafa is a popular tourist sight in the Buda Hills. It is mainly known for its panoramic scenery and fresh air. It is located in Svábhegy, a part of the 12th district of Budapest.

== The name ==
The name is derived from the name of a tree, the "Norma tree". Allegedly the beech tree was planted by King Matthias Corvinus in the 15th century. The name reflects an on-location performance by opera singer Rozália Klein Schodel and performers of the Hungarian National Theater in a rendition of the Cavatina from Vincenzo Bellini's Norma. The tree itself fell on the morning of June 19, 1927. The tree is commemorated in a poem by Gábor Devecseri.

== Geography ==
The height of the mountain is 477 m. It connects Svábhegy and János Hill with a long but narrow plateau (Normafa fennsík). The whole block is based on Dachstein formation.

== Gallery ==
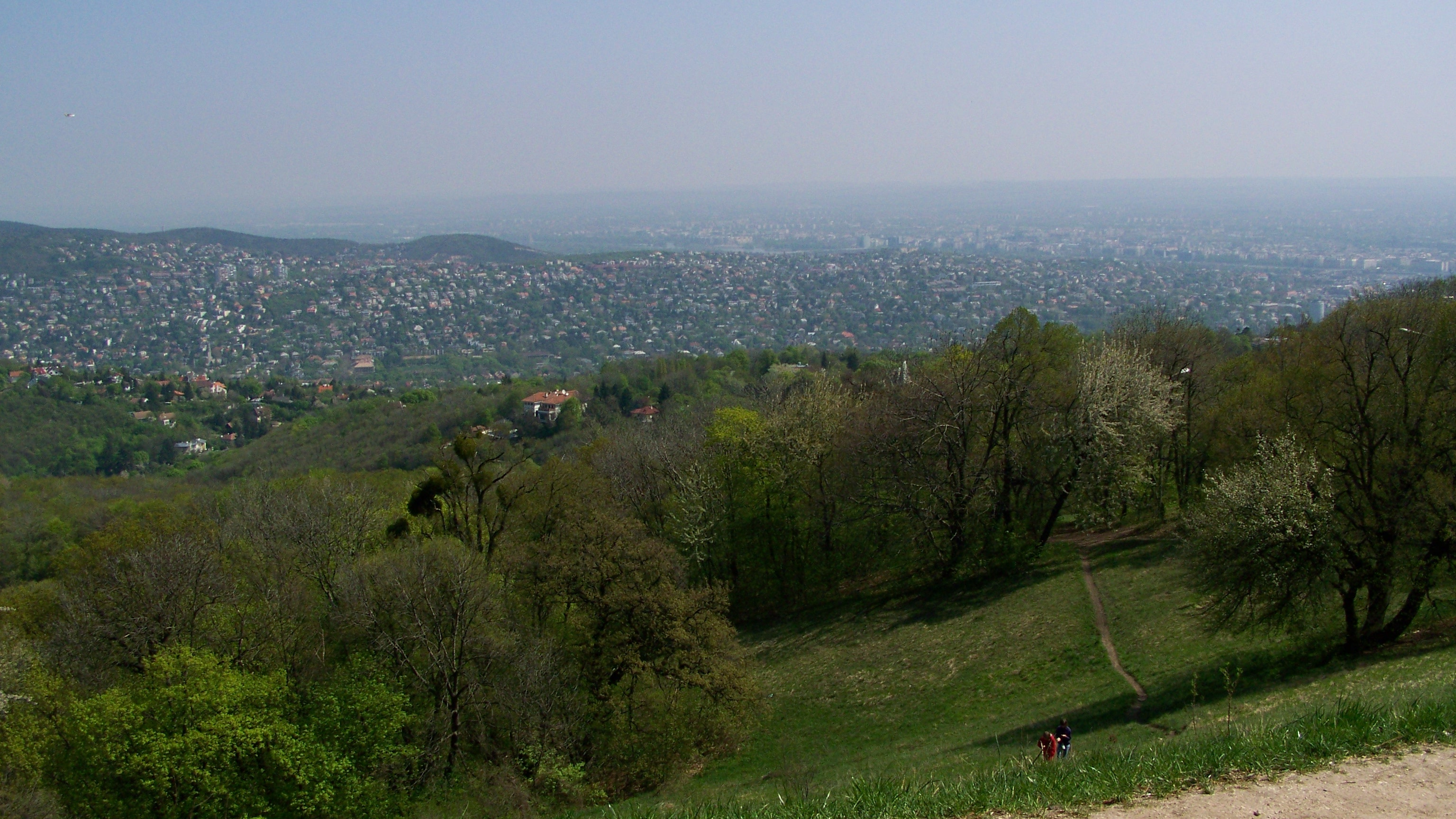

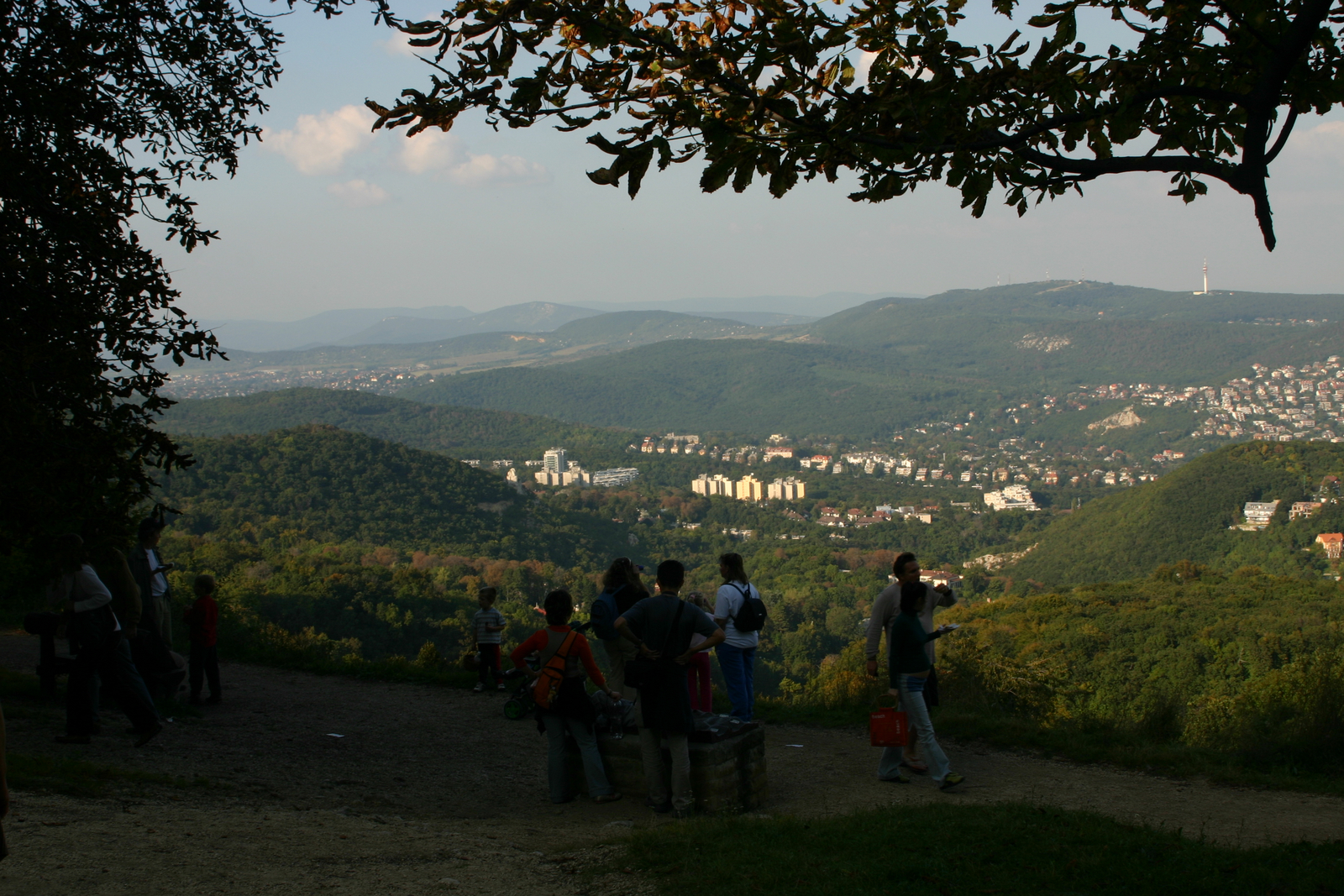

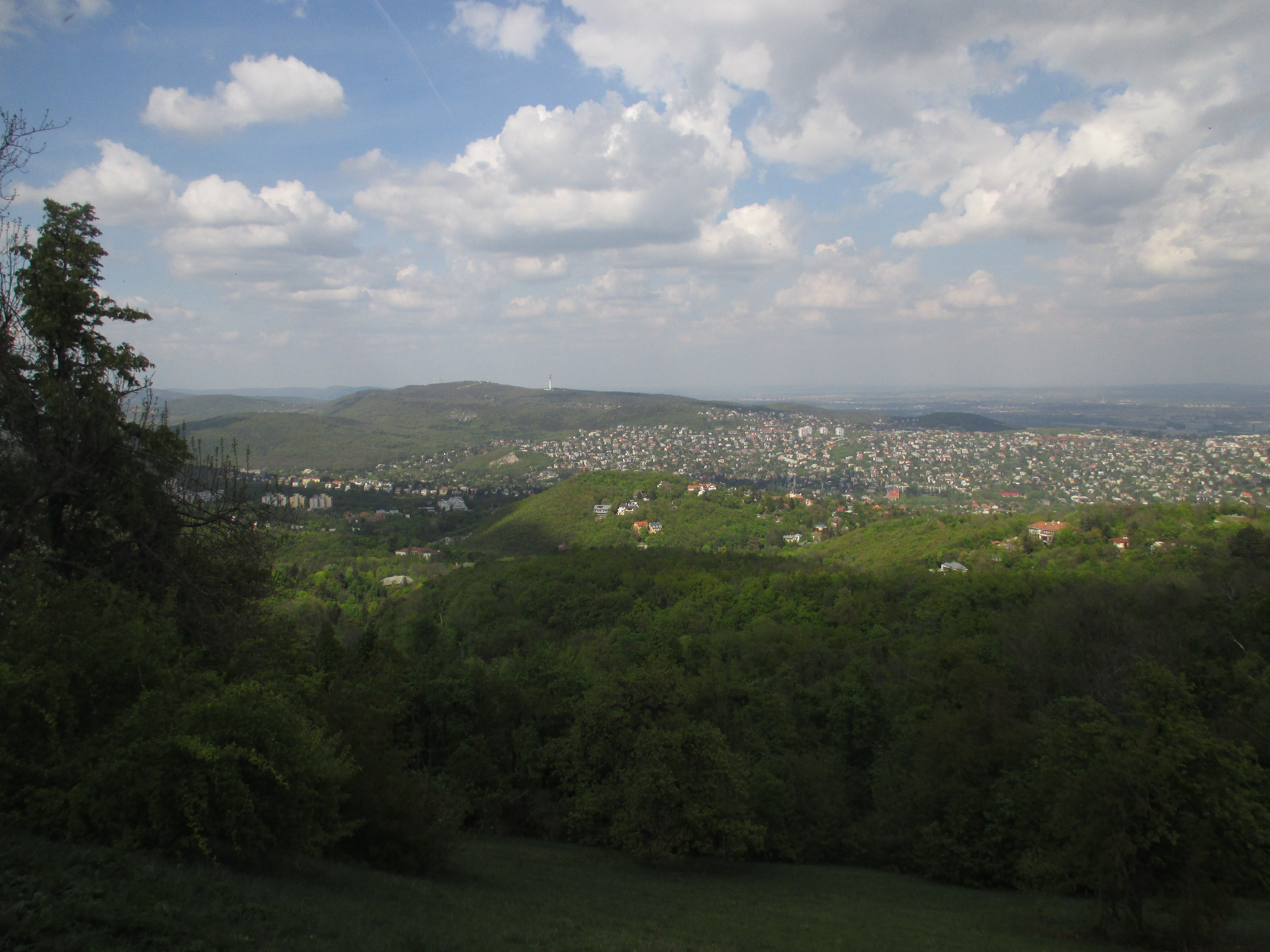

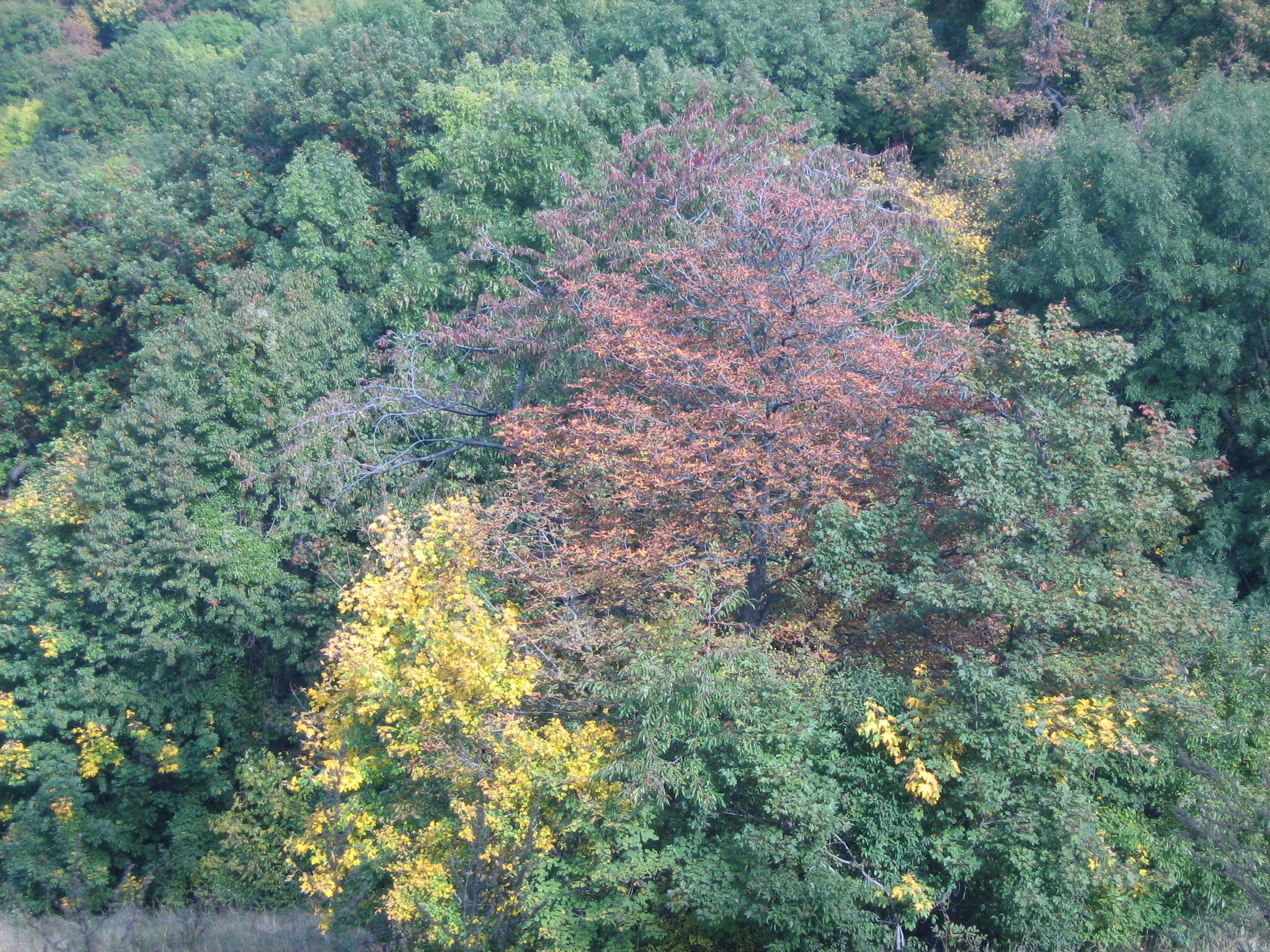

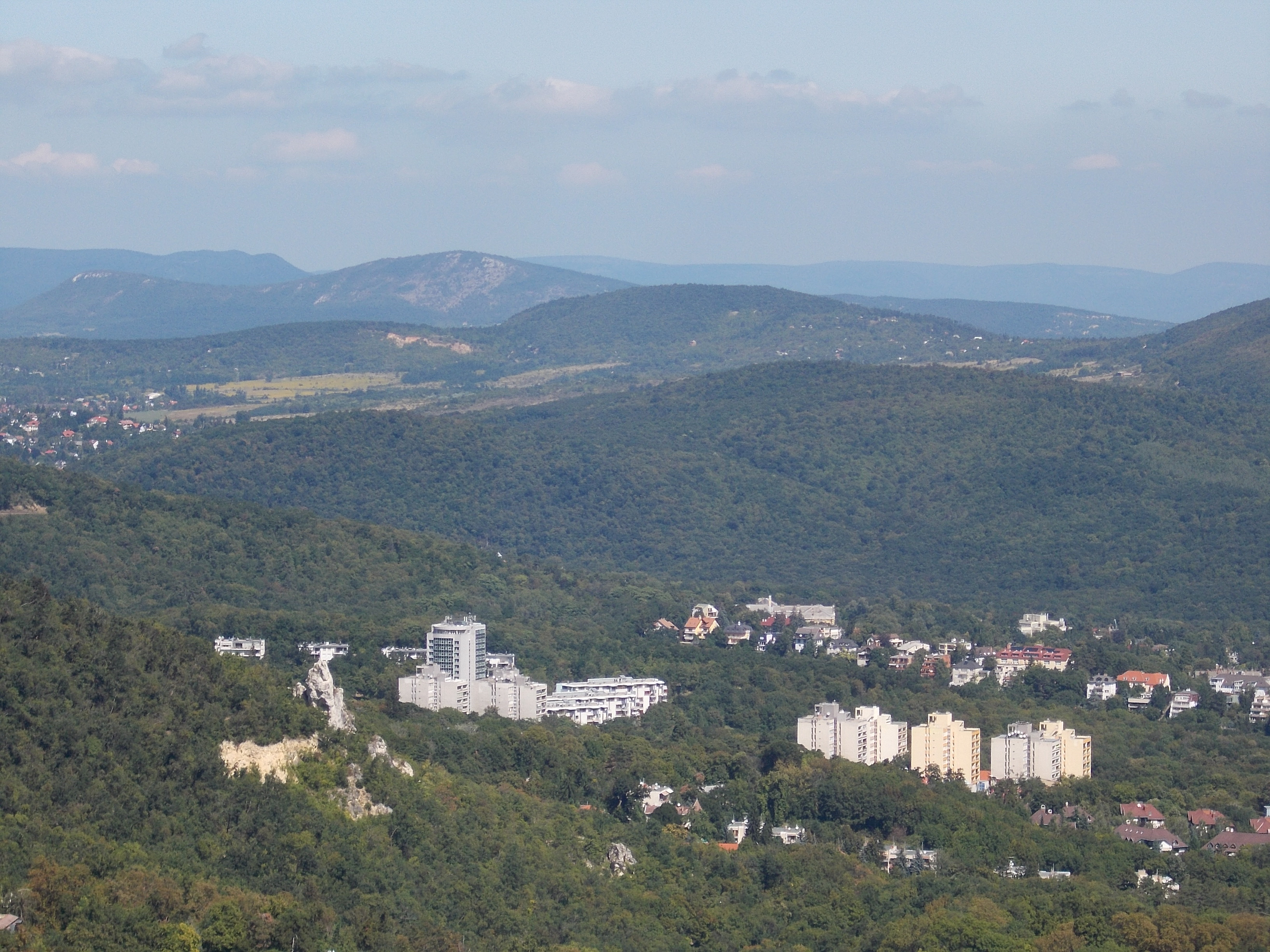
