= Szilárd Németh (politician) =

Hungarian teacher and politician

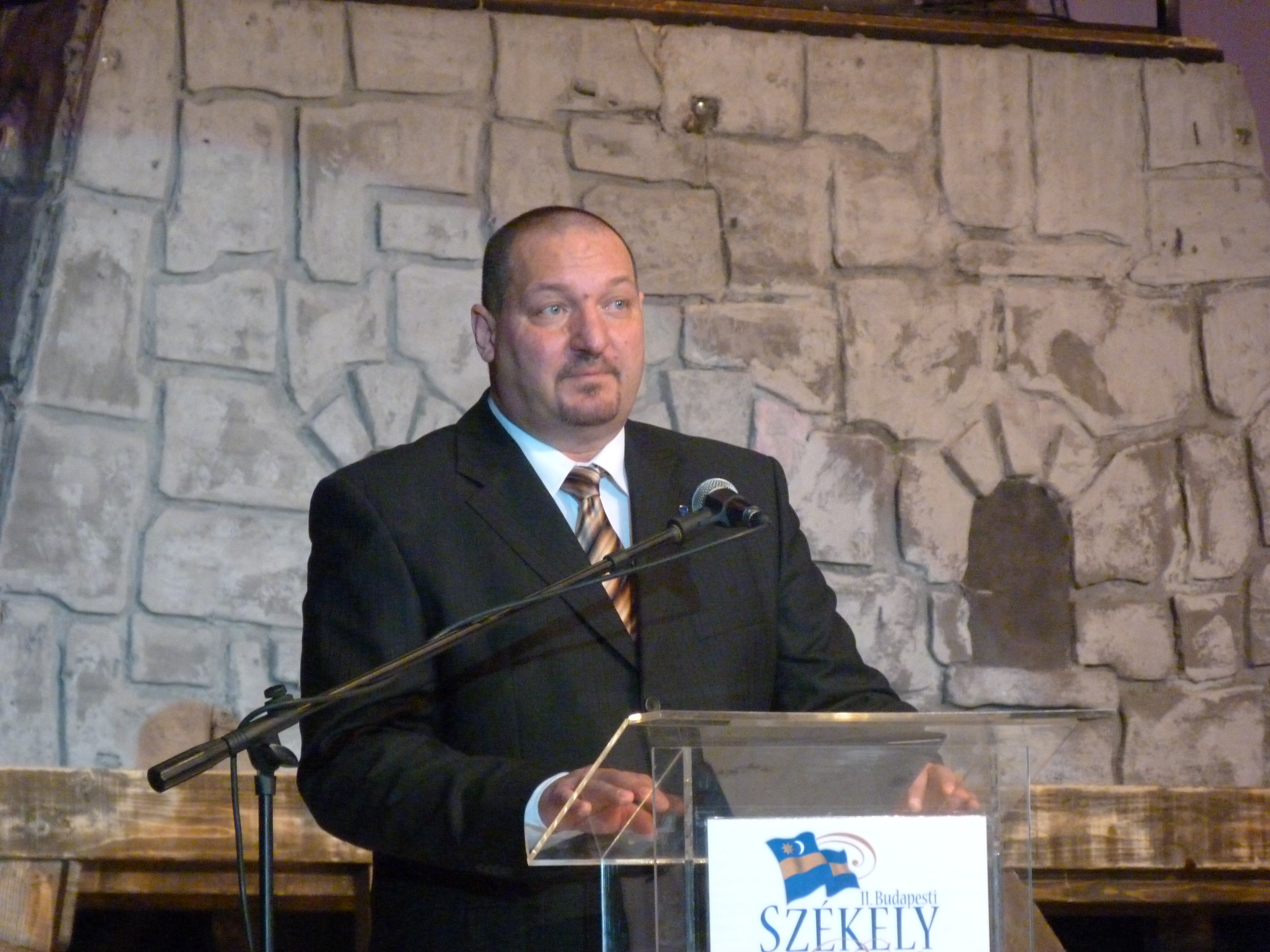

Mayor of Csepel District XXI, Budapest
- In office 3 October 2010 – 12 October 2014
- Preceded by: Mihály Tóth
- Succeeded by: Lénárd Borbély

Member of the National Assembly
- In office 14 September 2009 – 8 May 2026
- In office 27 August 2004 – 15 May 2006

Personal details
- Born: 24 April 1964 (age 62) Budapest, Hungary
- Party: SZDSZ; Fidesz
- Spouse: Ildikó Némethné Molnár
- Children: Virág; Bendegúz
- Profession: teacher, politician

Szilárd István Németh (Hungarian pronunciation: [ˈsilaːrd ˈistvaːn ˈneːmɛt]; born 24 April 1964) is a Hungarian teacher and politician. He served as the mayor of Csepel (21st district of Budapest) from 2010 to 2014. Besides that he represented Csepel (Budapest Constituency XXXI) in the National Assembly of Hungary between 2010 and 2014. He was also a member of parliament from the Budapest Regional List of Fidesz between 2004 and 2006, and from the Fidesz National List from 2009 to 2010 and from 2014 to 2026.

He was elected one of the four vice-presidents of the Fidesz on 13 December 2015. In the National Assembly, he was a member of the National Security Committee from 2011 to 2018 and Chairman of the Defense and Law Enforcement Committee from 2017 to 2018. He was appointed Secretary of State for Defence on 22 May 2018.

He is also President of the Hungarian Wrestling Association since 2015.

== Campaign against the "Soros-plan" ==
In 2017, Fidesz launched a campaign against the Hungarian-American billionaire George Soros. They say that Soros is financing migration, through his NGOs. Németh was in charge of this campaign. He represented an outlier point of view both in the parliament and in the media, as he said it's Soros behind the failure of metro line 3, and the melee at Kálvin tér. Németh wants to ban all of the NGOs funded by George Soros.

== Personal life ==
He is married and has two children.

Political offices
Preceded by Mihály Tóth	Mayor of Csepel; 2010–2014	Succeeded by Lénárd Borbély
