= Csepel =

21st District of Budapest Budapest XXI. kerülete Csepel
- District of Budapest
- District XXI
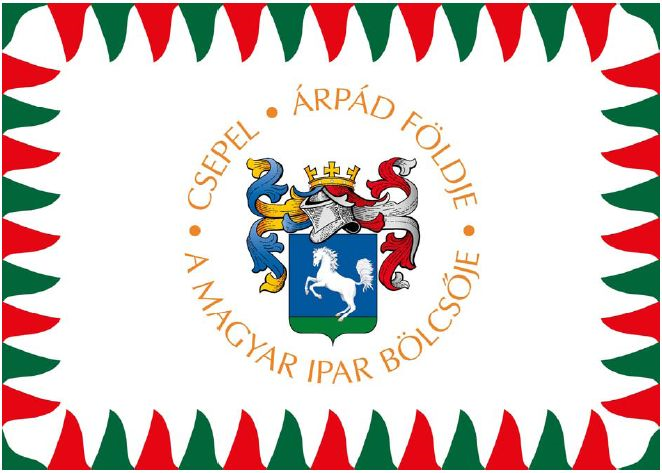
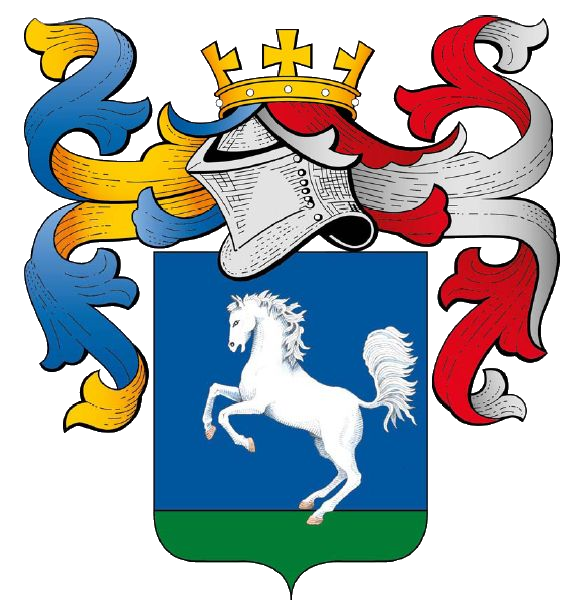
- Flag Coat of arms

- Location of District XXI in Budapest (shown in grey)
- Coordinates: 47°25′N 19°05′E
- Country: Hungary
- Region: Central Hungary
- City: Budapest
- Established: 1 January 1950
- Quarters: List: Csepel-Belváros; Csepel-Csillagtelep; Csepel-Erdőalja; Csepel-Erdősor; Csepel-Gyártelep; Csepel-Háros; Csepel-Kertváros; Csepel-Királyerdő; Csepel-Királymajor; Csepel-Ófalu; Csepel-Rózsadomb; Csepel-Szabótelep; Csepel-Szigetcsúcs

Government
  - Mayor: Lénárd Borbély (Ind.)

Area
  - Total: 25.75 km^{2} (9.94 sq mi)
  - Rank: 12th

Population (2016)
  - Total: 76,911
  - Rank: 11th
  - Density: 2,986/km^{2} (7,730/sq mi)
- Demonym(s): huszonegyedik kerületi ("21st districter"), csepeli
- Time zone: UTC+1 (CET)
  - Summer (DST): UTC+2 (CEST)
- Postal code: 1211 ... 1215
- Website: www.csepel.hu

Csepel (German: Tschepele), officially known as the 21st District of Budapest (Hungarian: Budapest XXI. kerülete) is a district and a neighbourhood in Budapest, Hungary. Csepel officially became part of Budapest on 1 January 1950.

== Name ==
The village and the island were named after the first comes (Hungarian: ispán) of the area, Csepel. The German and Serbo-Croat names are derived from the older Hungarian one.

== Location ==
Csepel is located at the northern end of Csepel Island in the Danube, and covers one-tenth of the island's area. Being on an island, it is the only complete district of Budapest which is neither in Pest nor in Buda. On the western side it is bordered by the Danube, while the Ráckevei-Duna (Ráckeve's Danube) runs along the eastern side. The twenty-first district is bordered by the settlements of Szigetszentmiklós and Lakihegy to the south. It has approximately 85,000 inhabitants.

== Transportation ==
Csepel is most easily accessed from central Budapest by the H7 Csepel HÉV, a high capacity suburban railway. In addition, it is served by BKK buses 138, 35, 36, 148, 151, and 179. Bridges connect Csepel to southern parts of Pest, Ferencváros and Pesterzsébet, and a ferry links Csepel to Soroksár.

By car Csepel can be reached by crossing the Kvassay Bridge (Kvassay híd), Gubacsi Bridge (Gubacsi híd), the D-14 ferry, or via the M0 motorway.

A separated bike path is also maintained across the Kvassay and Gubacsi Bridges.

== History ==
Csepel Island became the personal domain of Árpád after the migration of Hungarians into Pannonia in the early 10th century. It remained a favourite resort of the Hungarian kings in the Middle Ages. From 1484 onwards Csepel was the wedding present to future Hungarian queens. The Ottoman Turks destroyed the village and the royal manor house in the 16th century. At the end of the 17th century, Serb refugees from Turkish-occupied Serbia settled here. At the beginning of the 18th century Prince Eugene of Savoy, owner of the island, re-established the settlement and populated it with German colonists. It became an independent municipality in 1742. The original village was located in the present-day freeport (Szabadkikötő) area but it was destroyed by the great flood of 1838. The new village was built on higher ground, in present-day Ófalu (Old Village). The town had a population of 9462 according to the 1910 census (the ethnic composition was 84% Hungarian and 18% German). Formerly it was a working-class borough with several factories; there was even a bicycle named Csepel. During the Hungarian Revolution of 1956 in Budapest, Hungarian fighters made their last stand in Csepel. Today, Csepel contains housing estates as well as middle-class garden suburbs. The district is home to the sports club Csepel SC.

== Population ==
Historical population
Year	Pop.	±%
1870	1,356	—
1880	1,555	+14.7%
1890	2,277	+46.4%
1900	4,605	+102.2%
1910	9,752	+111.8%
1920	14,075	+44.3%
1930	23,805	+69.1%
1941	47,812	+100.8%
1949	46,621	−2.5%
1960	59,963	+28.6%
1970	73,780	+23.0%
1980	76,692	+3.9%
1990	90,197	+17.6%
2001	80,982	−10.2%
2008	76,320	−5.8%

Ethnic groups (2001 census):

- Magyars – 92.4%
- Germans – 0.7%
- Romani – 0.7%
- Others – 0.9%
- No answer – 5.3%

Religions (2001 census):

- Roman Catholic – 41.4%
- Calvinist – 13%
- Greek Catholic – 2.2%
- Lutheran – 1.7%
- Other (Christian) – 1%
- Other (non-Christian) – 0.3%
- Atheists – 25.1%
- No answer, unknown – 15.2%

== Landmarks ==
Noteworthy sights include the Baroque parish church built in 1770, the Csepel Gallery and Museum of Local History (newly moved to Szent Istvan ut. 230), and the Csepel Collection of Factory History.

== List of mayors ==
Member	Party	Date
Béla Hajdú	SZDSZ	1990–1994
Mihály Tóth	MSZP	1994–2010
Szilárd Németh	Fidesz	2010–2014
Lénárd Borbély	Fidesz	2014-
Lénárd Borbély	Ind.	2014-

== Twin towns – sister cities ==
Csepel is twinned with:

- Băile Tușnad, Romania
- Gănești, Romania
- Kielce, Poland
- Rijeka, Croatia
- Salonta, Romania
- Wołomin, Poland

== Gallery ==
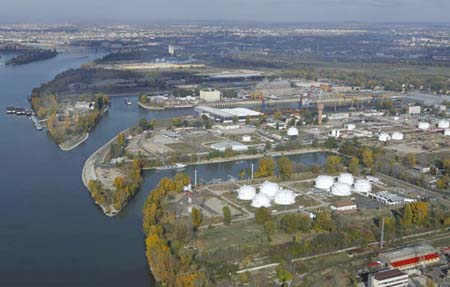

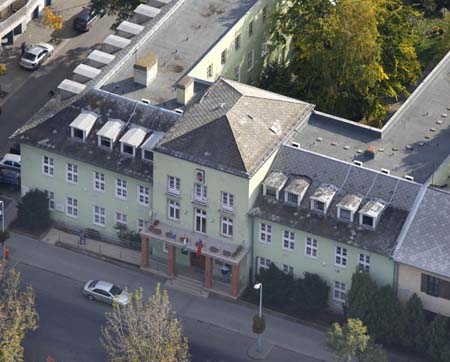

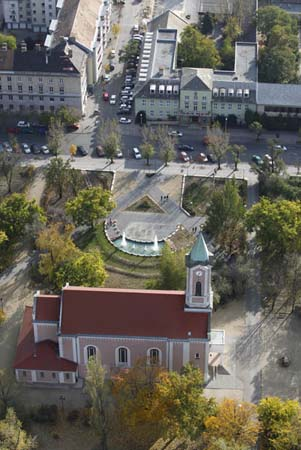

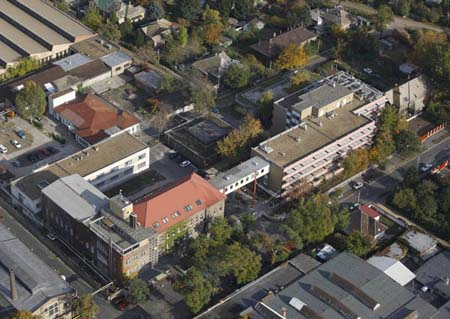

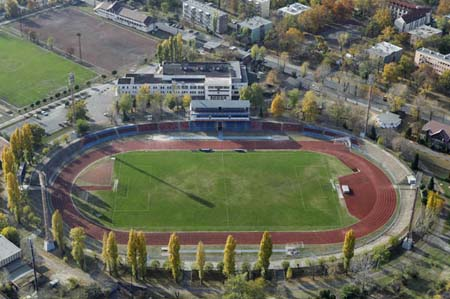
Béke téri Stadion

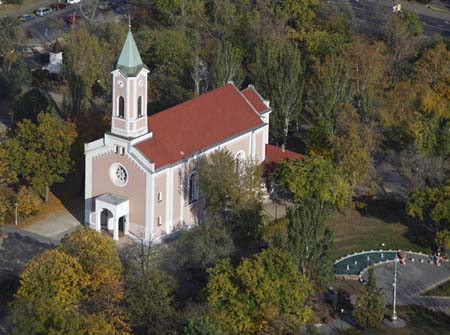

== Sport ==
- Csepel SC, association football team
- Csepel Autó SE, association football team
- Csepeli Papír SC, association football team

== See also ==
- Csepel Island
- Jedlik Ányos Secondary Grammar School
