= Rákosmente =

District XVII of Budapest (Rákosmente) Budapest XVII. kerülete
- District of Budapest
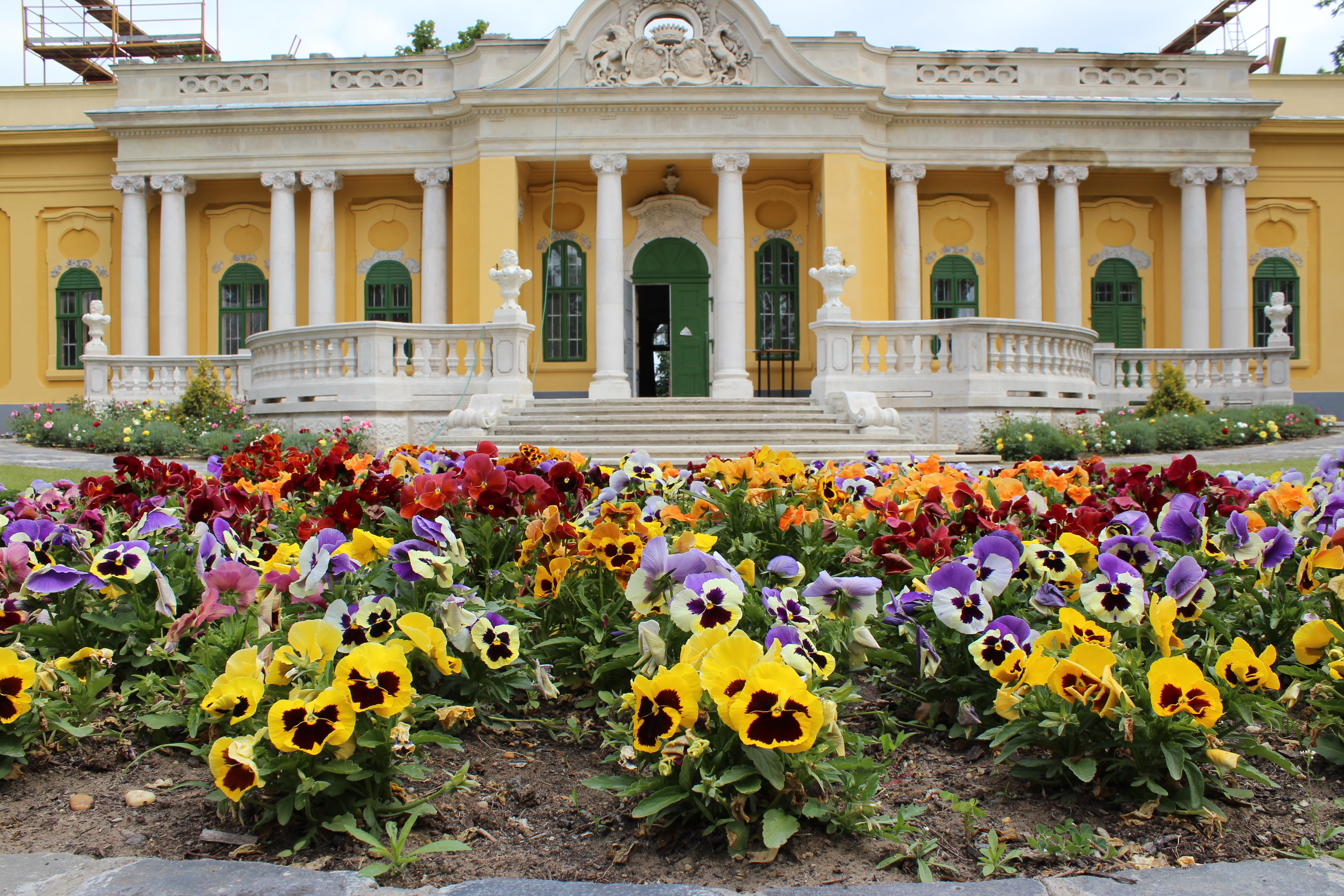
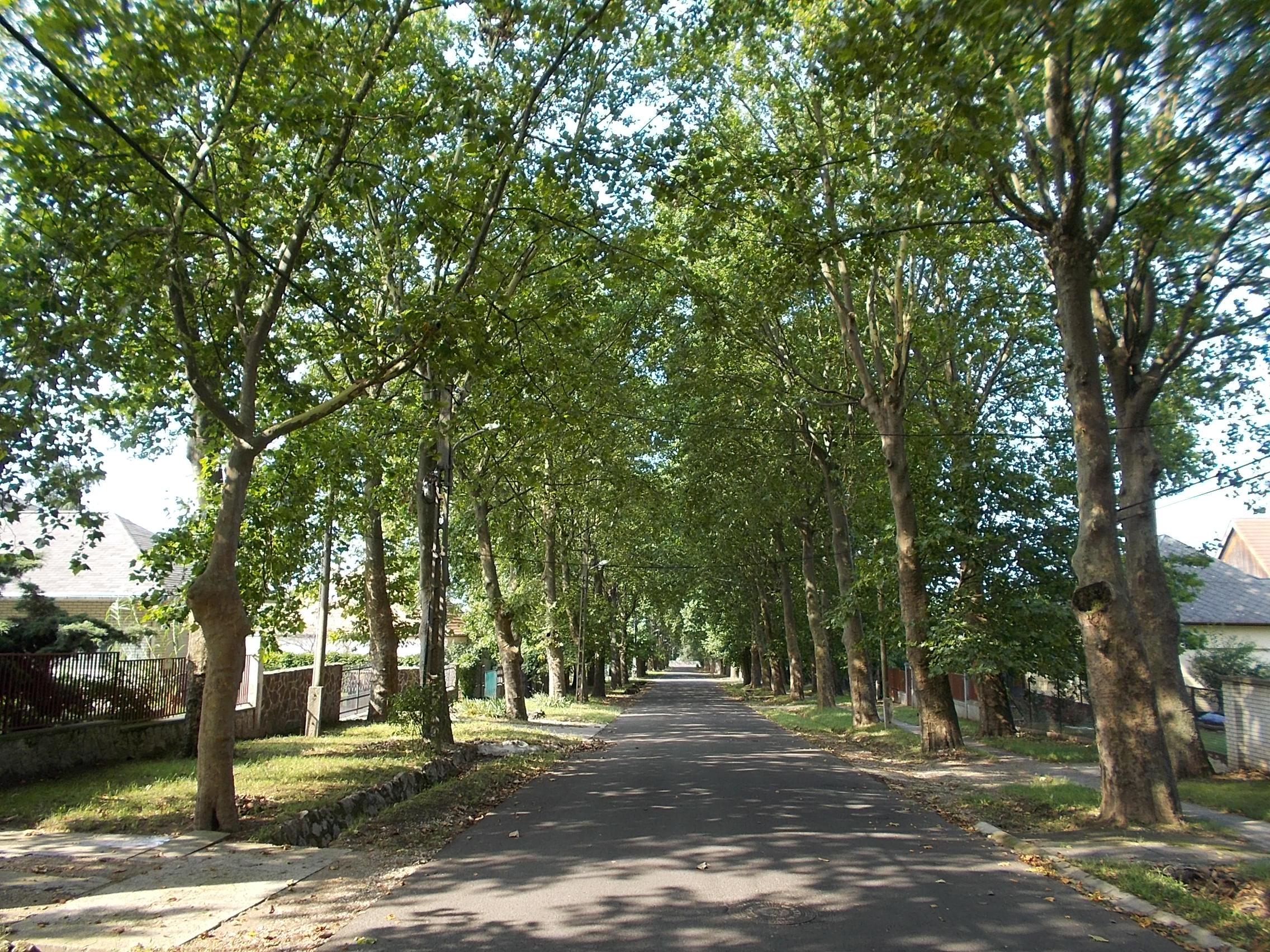
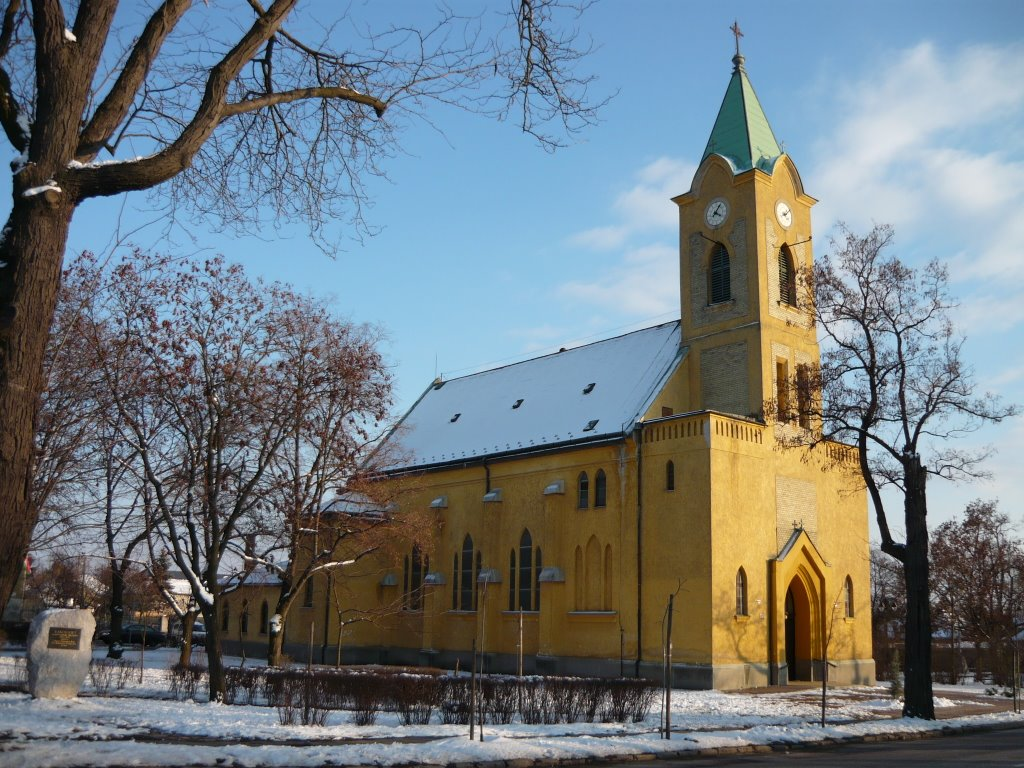
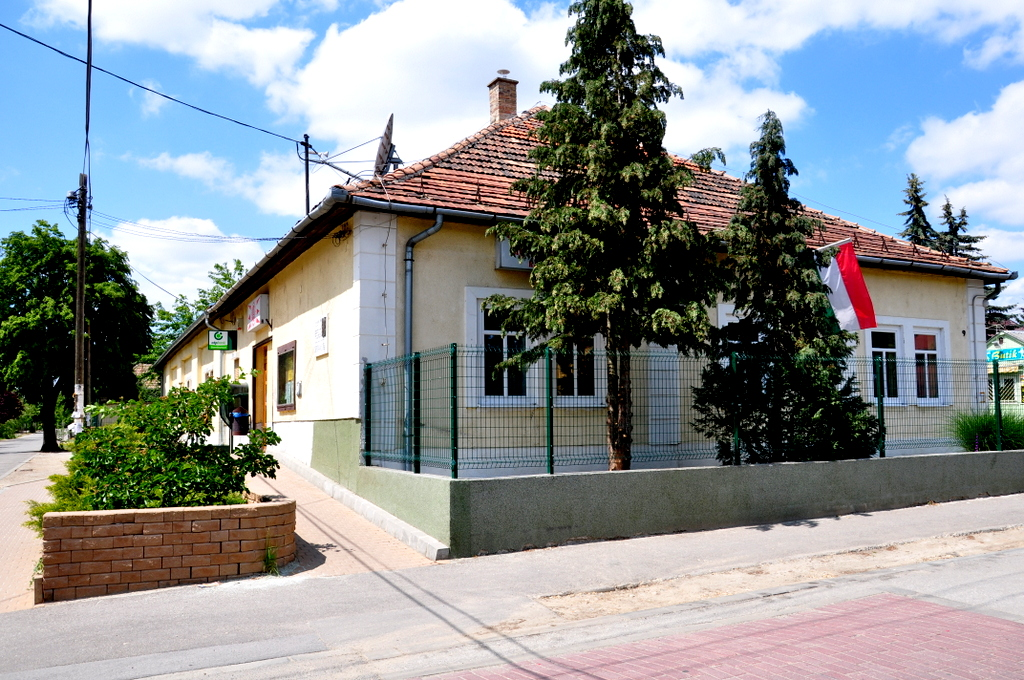
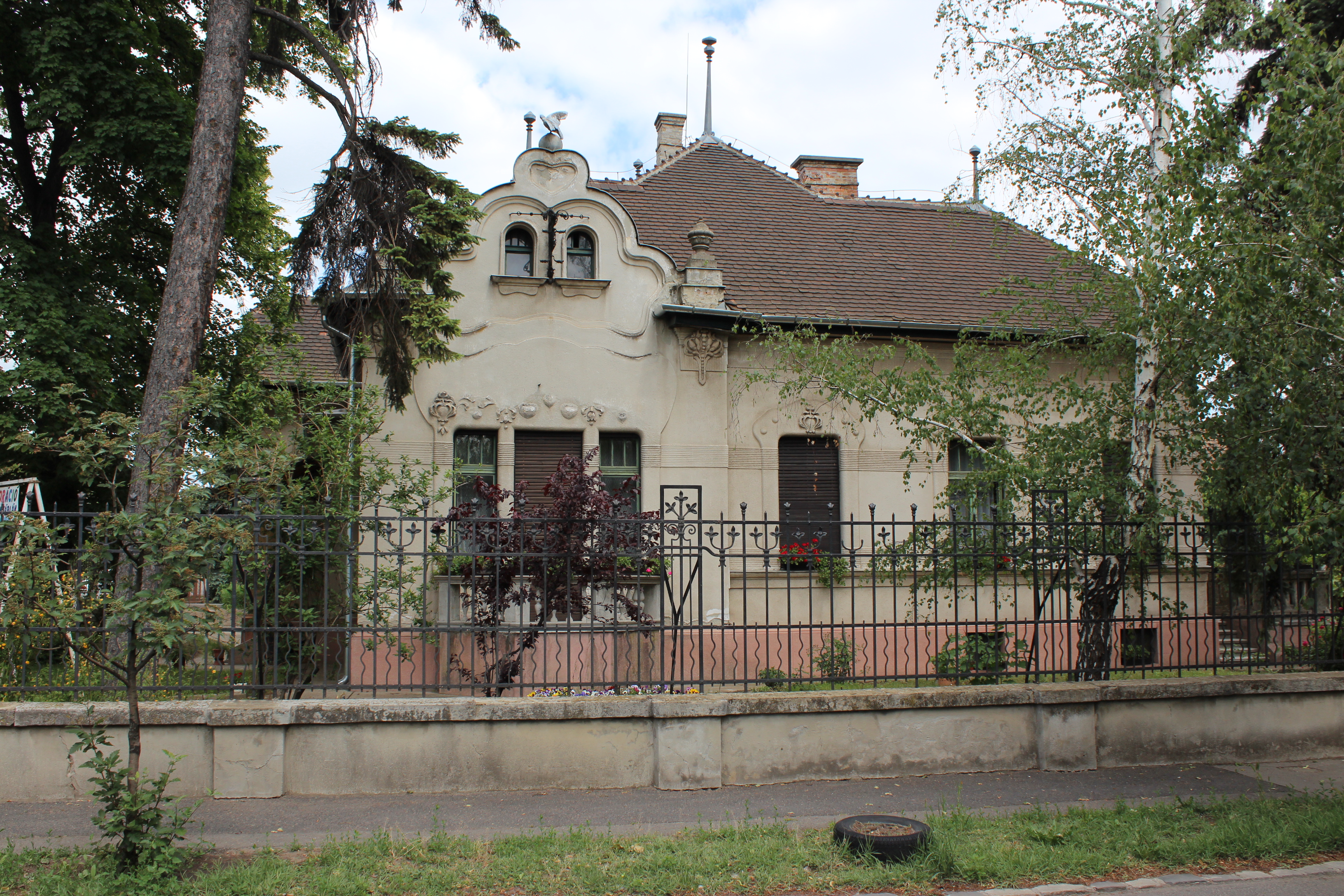
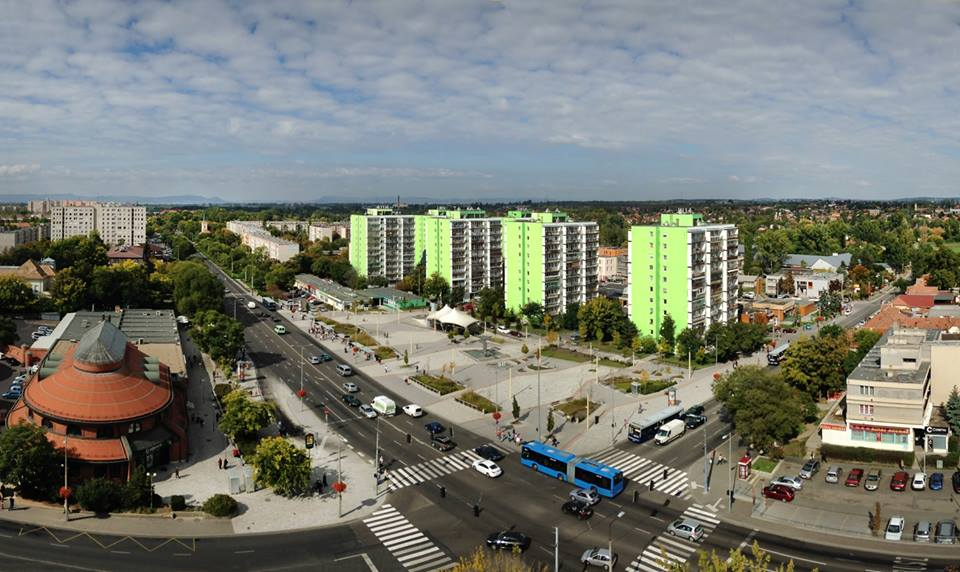
- Clockwise from top: Podmaniczky–Vigyázó Mansion, Our Lady of Hungary Church in Rákosliget, Mansion of Gyula Gózon, Rákosmente City Center, Árpád Csekovszky cultural center, Rákoskert Avenue

- Flag Coat of arms

- Location of District XVII in Budapest (grey)
- Coordinates: 47.4803°N 19.2667°E
- Country: Hungary
- Region: Central Hungary
- City: Budapest
- Established: 1 January 1950
- Named for: Rákos Stream
- Neighborhoods: List: Akadémiaújtelep; Madárdomb; Rákoscsaba; Rákoscsaba-Újtelep; Rákoshegy; Rákoskeresztúr; Rákoskert; Rákosliget; Régiakadémiatelep

Government
  - Mayor: Tamás Horváth (Fidesz-KDNP)

Area
  - Total: 54.82 km^{2} (21.17 sq mi)
  - Rank: 1st
- Highest elevation: 241 m (791 ft)

Population (2020)
  - Total: 87,388
  - Rank: 7th
  - Density: 1,594/km^{2} (4,129/sq mi)
- Demonym: tizenhetedik kerületi ("17th districter")
- Postal code: 1171 ... 1174
- Website: www.rakosmente.hu

District XVII of Budapest, known as Rákosmente, is a suburban district of Budapest on the left bank of the Danube, in the eastern part of the capital. It is Budapest's largest district, with an area of 54.82 km^{2}, and home to nearly 90,000 people, making it the seventh most populous district of Budapest. Towns that were different in nature, but closely connected, were annexed to the capital in 1950 as part of the Greater Budapest plan. It is one of the most beautifully located districts of Pest, which is partly located as high as the 235 meters Gellért Hill. As the district is part of the Pest Plain, which gradually rises from the Danube to the east, the district's area is almost entirely hilly. The 241 meter high Erdő Hill, the highest point of the Pest side and the Pest Plain is also located here.

The majority of the district is green area, in terms of per capita green and forest areas, the 2nd district of Budapest, the Hegyvidék and as well District XVII is the best-served districts of the capital. There are several nature reserves in its area, such as the 40-hectare Merzse-marsh full of plant rarities and rich birdlife, the vast green area of the Keresztúr Forest, and Lake Naplás, the second largest nature reserve in Budapest with 150 hectares, is also one of the most valuable ecological areas in the area.

District XVII was the most popular district of Budapest according to the moves in 2019, 1045 more people settled here down than who moved out. The population of the suburban district growth as a result of suburbanization and still increasing today, despite the fact that the population of Budapest has decreased by hundreds of thousands in recent decades. Due to the population growth, new housing estates areas were built on previously green or agricultural areas, and the existing ones were expanded.

The district has high level of public transport supply, with 67, 97E, 161, 161A, 169E, 261E bus lines taking 15–20 minutes from the western part of the district and around 25 minutes from the eastern part to arrive directly to Örs vezér tere and to Metro Line M2, while with 68, 201E, 202E buses Kőbánya-Kispest metro station and Metro Line M3 is directly accessible. The area is easily accessible from the city center at night with 956 and 990 night buses, which covering almost the entire district. In addition, there are six train stops in the immediate vicinity of the residential areas, from where can be reached the Budapest Keleti railway station in 15 minutes with modern suburban trains.

== Neighbourhoods ==
The names of the neighbourhoods in Rákosmente come from the names of the original villages, adding the newly built neighbourhoods as well:

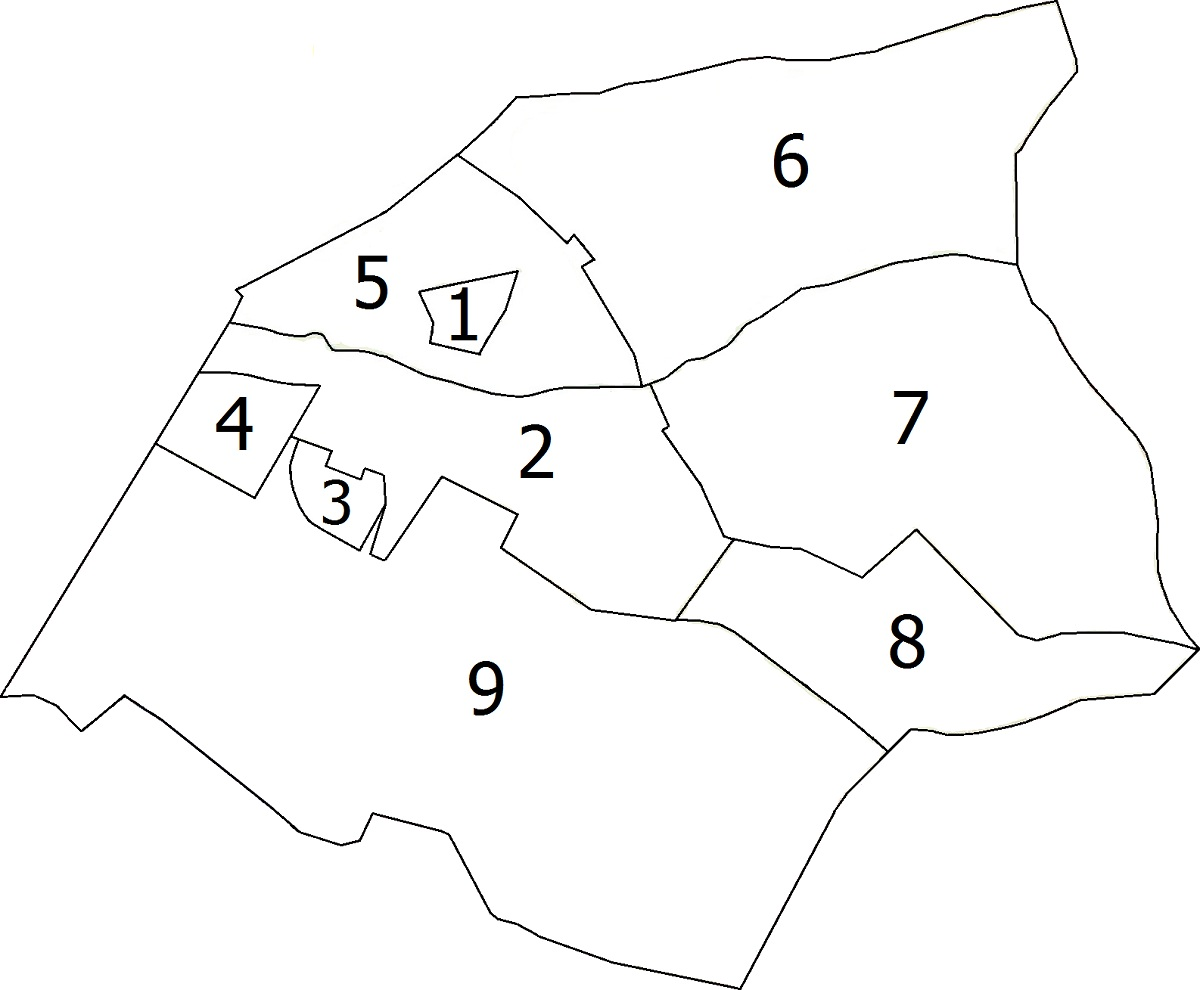

1. Régiakadémiatelep (1930s)
2. Rákoskeresztúr (13th century)
3. Madárdomb (1984)
4. Akadémiaújtelep (1950s)
5. Rákosliget (1896)
6. Rákoscsaba-Újtelep (1925)
7. Rákoscsaba (11th century)
8. Rákoskert (1933)
9. Rákoshegy (1892)

== Location ==
It is one of the most beautifully located districts of Pest, which is partly as high as Gellért Hill. As it is part of the Pest alluvial plain, which gradually rises east of the Danube within the Pest Plain, its area is almost entirely hilly. The Pest side and at the same time the highest point of the Pest plain, Erdő-hegy, is also located here at the easternmost residential meeting of Rákoskert and Rákoscsaba, along Pesti út. Its height is 241 meters (Gellért Hill is 235 meters). From the eastern border of the district, the slopes of the Gödöllő Hills start to the north and the Monor – Irsai Hills to the south. Rákosmente with its area of 54.83 km^{2}, is more than 25 times larger than the smallest district; Erzsébetváros "Elisabethtown" (7th).

Rákosmente is bordered by the 16th district to the northwest, by the 10th district to the west, by the 18th district to the southwest, by Ecser and Maglód to the southeast, by Pécel to the east and by Nagytarcsa to the northeast.

== Economy ==
In terms of economy, Rákosmente belongs to the most developed part of Hungary, the Central Hungary region. Rákosmente is an important supply center of the Budapest metropolitan area, and attracts the surrounding settlements (Ecser, Maglód, Pécel) to provides administrative service, public cultural services and health functions as well. There are two major industrial facilities (DAF Trucks, Volvo) and one fruit processing plant (Rauch) in Rákosmente. The agricultural activity in the district is negligible.

In 2011, 7,169 operating enterprises were registered in Rákosmenten, and the local economy is primarily dominated by service firms. From local firms 791 were retail stores, of which 133 were grocery stores, 127 food specialty stores, and 406 were non-food retail specialty stores. The number of petrol stations in the district in 2011 was 14 and the number of vehicle shops was 65. There are three operating markets and trade fairs in the district, of which one is municipally owned and two are privately owned. The number of restaurants was 191 in the district.

According to the 2011 census, 56.0% of the people living in Rákosmente work outside the district, this ratio is equal to the average commuting data of the districts of Budapest. The commuting time of the residents to work is 39.5 minutes on average, only slightly higher than in the case of the inner districts, which showed a value of 36 minutes.

Most of the neighbourhoods of Rákosmente has no significant variance in the social composition and employment indicators. The economic characteristic of the population of the newly built Madárdomb and the population living on the outskirts differ significantly. While Madárdomb is a young part of the settlement, the inhabitants of it mostly came from the upper-middle class segments, understandably all indicators (employment, education) show an outstanding value, while in the outskirts they are significantly worse. The biggest positive difference is in case of Madárdomb, where the proportion of people with higher education is 46.7%, twice the district average and more than five times higher, than the peripheral indicator.

== Population ==
The district was established on January 1, 1950. Data from 1949 and earlier are the total population of former municipalities in the district.

Lakosságszám
Year	Pop.	±% p.a.
1870	3,924	—
1880	4,301	+0.92%
1890	5,135	+1.79%
1900	9,157	+5.95%
1910	14,391	+4.62%
1920	16,312	+1.26%
1930	23,049	+3.52%
1941	34,876	+3.84%
1949	35,753	+0.31%
1960	41,969	+1.47%
1970	50,405	+1.85%
1980	56,279	+1.11%
1990	72,317	+2.54%
2001	79,989	+0.92%
2011	84,381	+0.54%
2017	87,773	+0.66%

== Sports ==
The association football club, Rákosmenti KSK, is based in Rákosmente.

== List of mayors ==
Member	Party	Date
József Dóczy	SZDSZ	1990–1994
Péter Kátai	SZDSZ	1994–1998
Katalin Devánszkiné Molnár	MSZP	1998–2002
Attila Hoffmann	MSZP	2002–2006
Levente Riz	Fidesz	2006–2019
Tamás Horváth	Fidesz	2019–

== Twin towns – sister cities ==
Rákosmente is twinned with:

- Gheorgheni, Romania
- Krosno, Poland
- Lovran, Croatia
- Botevgrad, Bulgaria
- Yalova, Turkey
- Aosta, Italy
- Parihuzovce, Slovakia
- Totovo Selo, Serbia
- Fojnica, Bosnia and Herzegovina
- Popovo, Ukraine
- Alavus, Finland

== Gallery ==
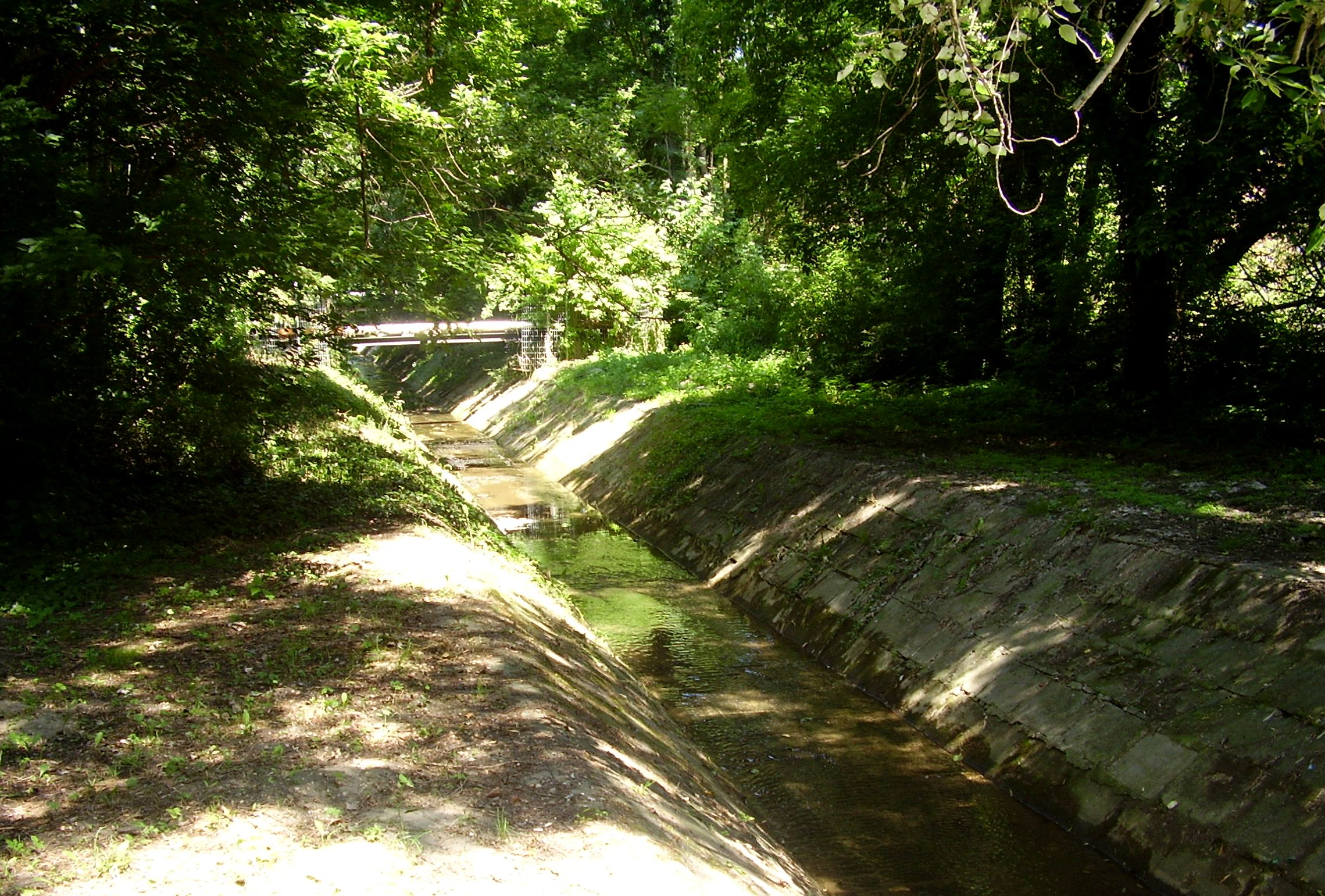
The 44 km long Rákos Stream which estuary to Danube, from the name Rákosmente is derived

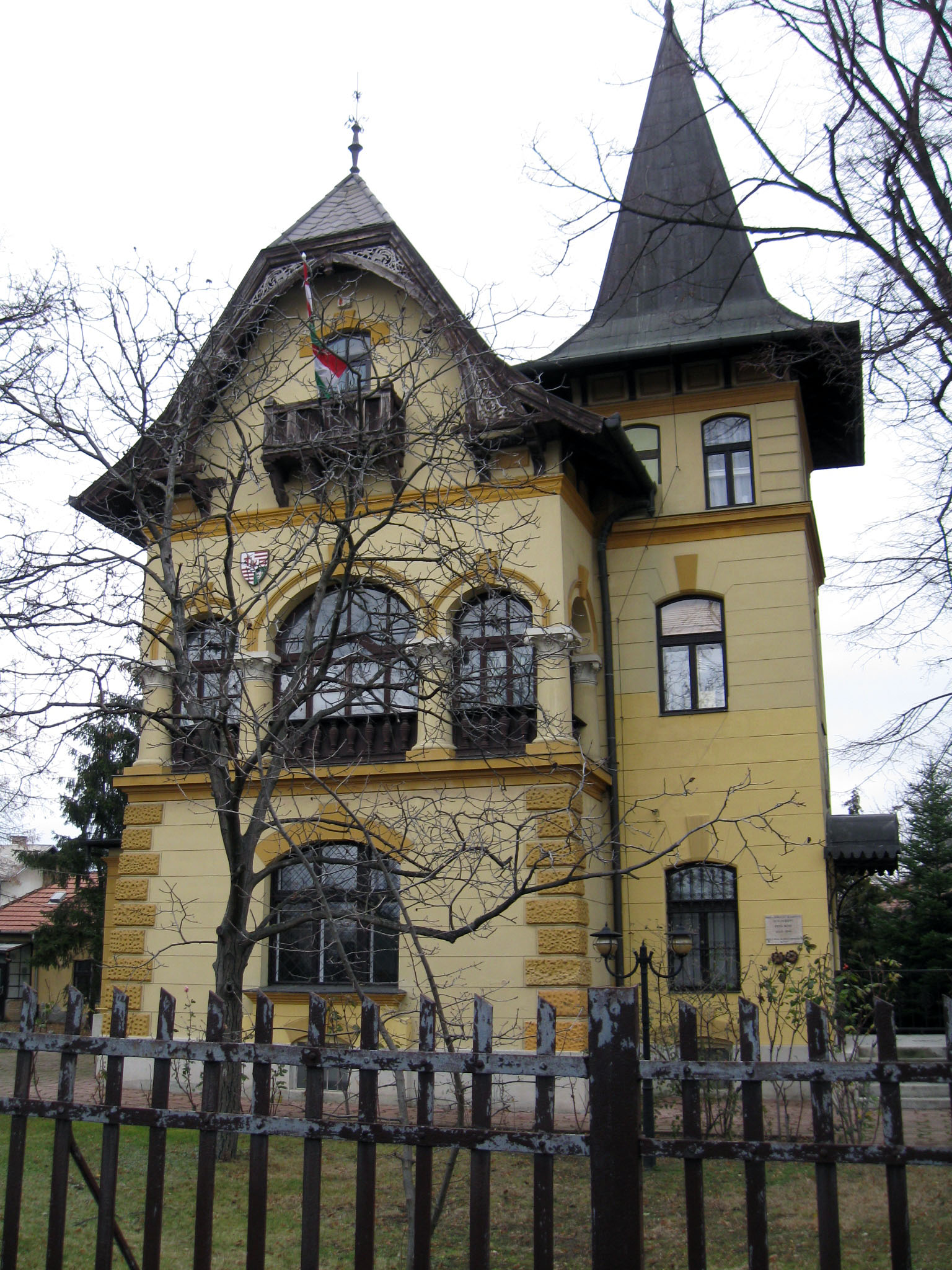
Erdős Renée mansion at Rákoshegy

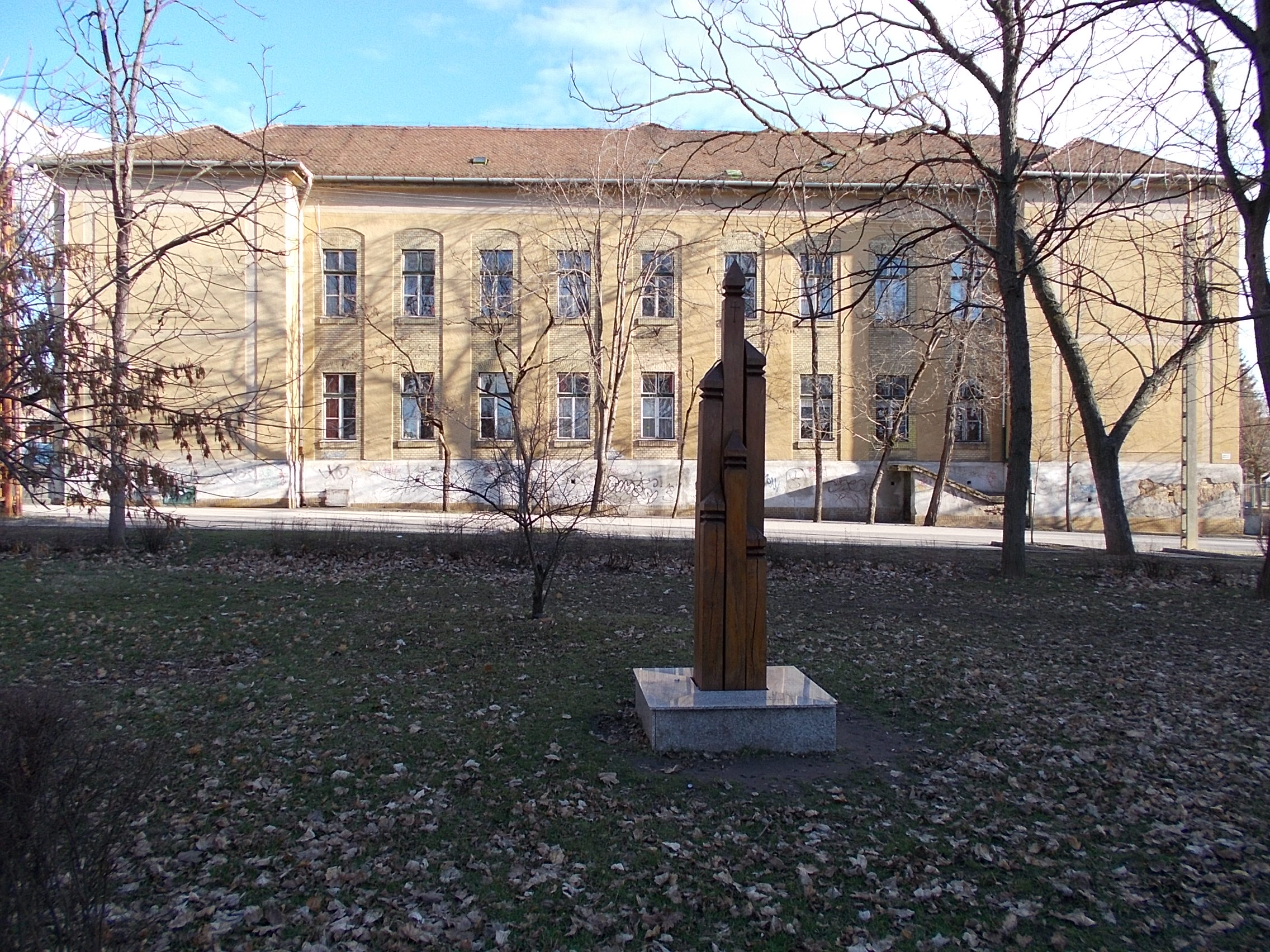
Gregor József Primary School in Rákosliget

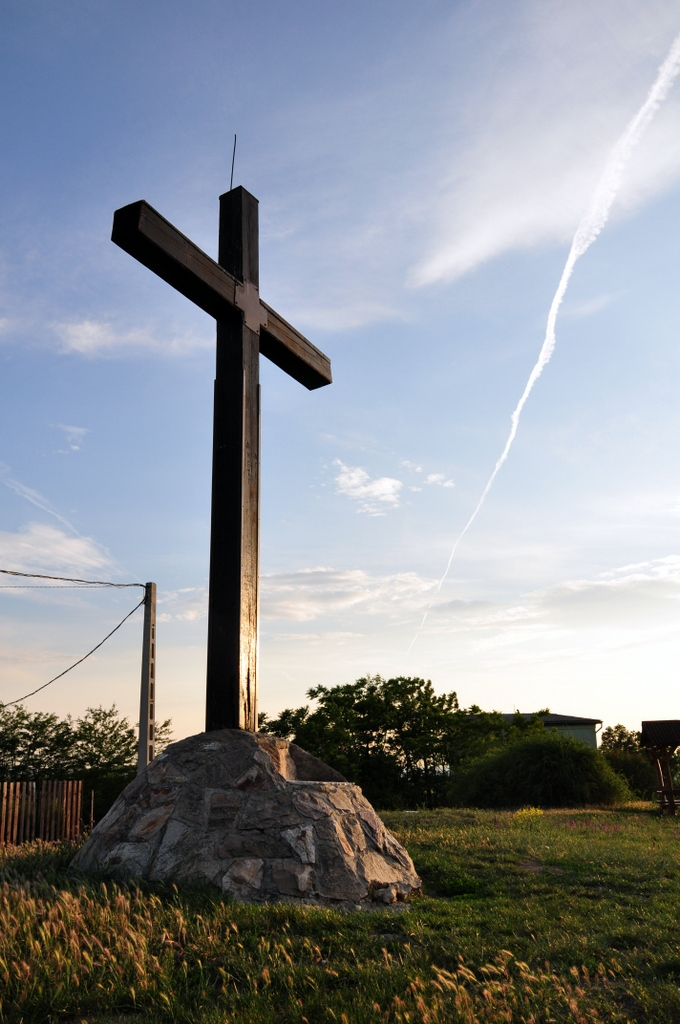
The 201-meter-high Vida Hill, offering a panoramic view of the Pest side

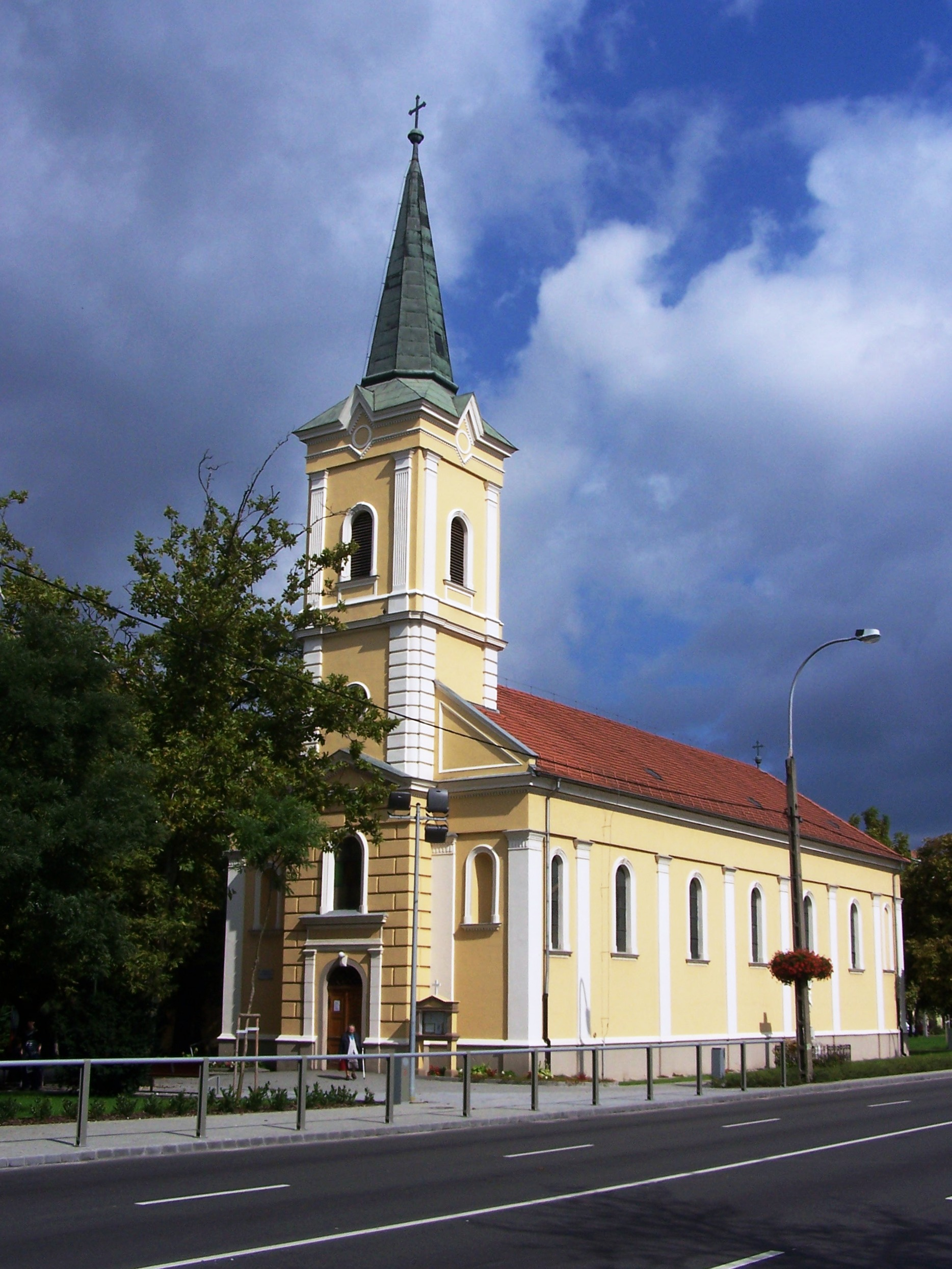
The monumental Church of the Holy Cross, built in 1894, in the square of the same name along the Pesti út

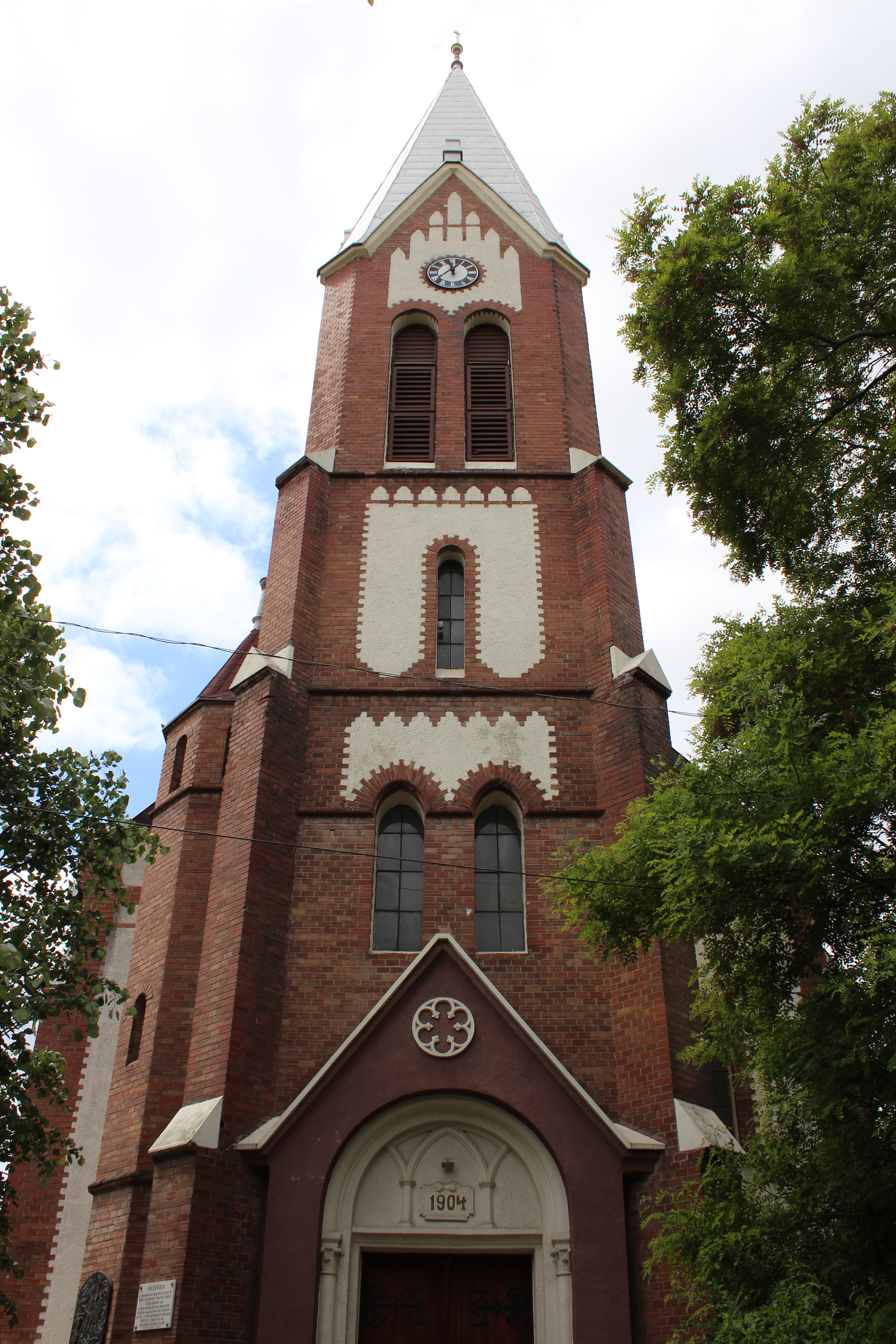
Reformed Church built in 1905, in Rákoscsaba neighbourhood

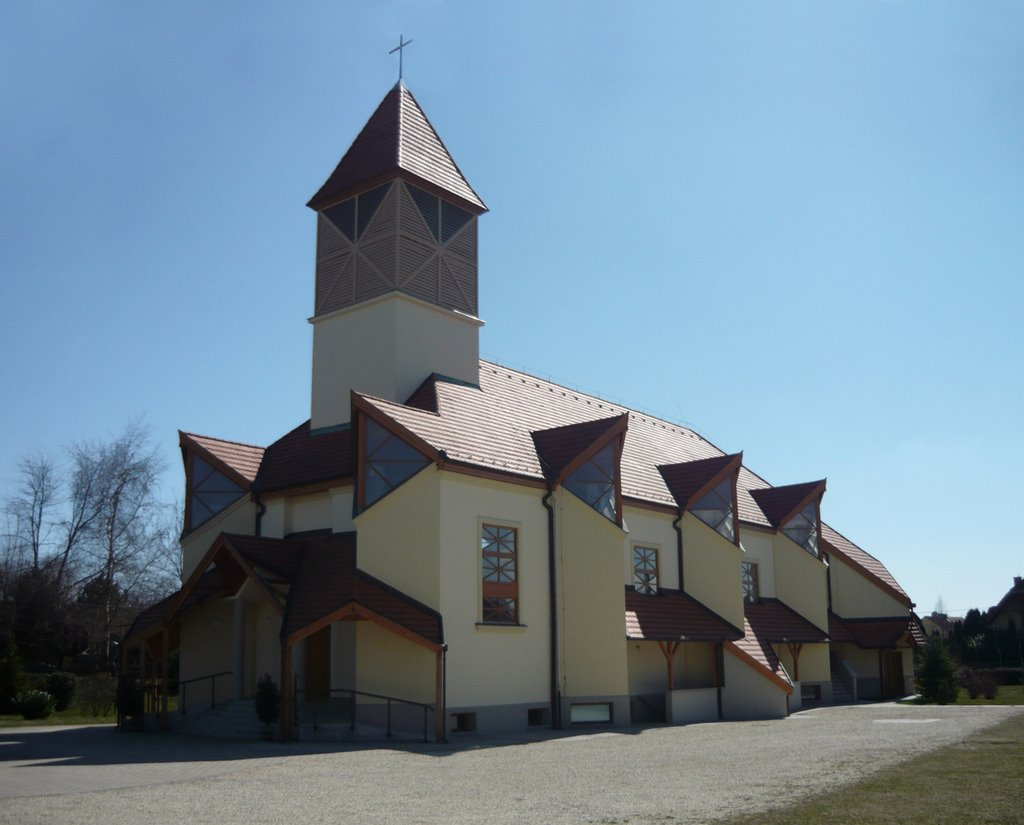
Catholic Church of St. Paul, completed in 2000, in Madárdomb neighbourhood

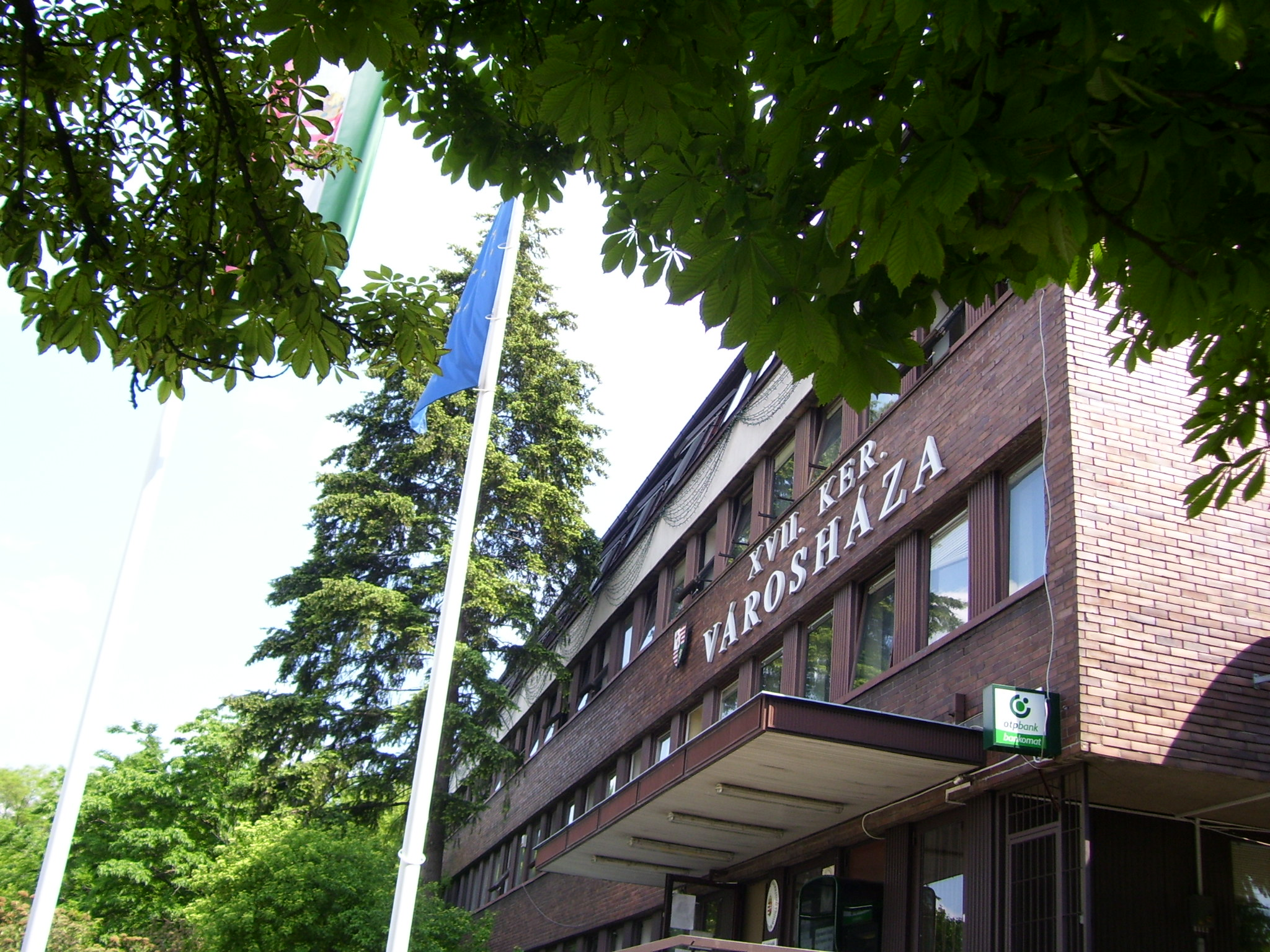
The Town hall of Rákosmente in the city center

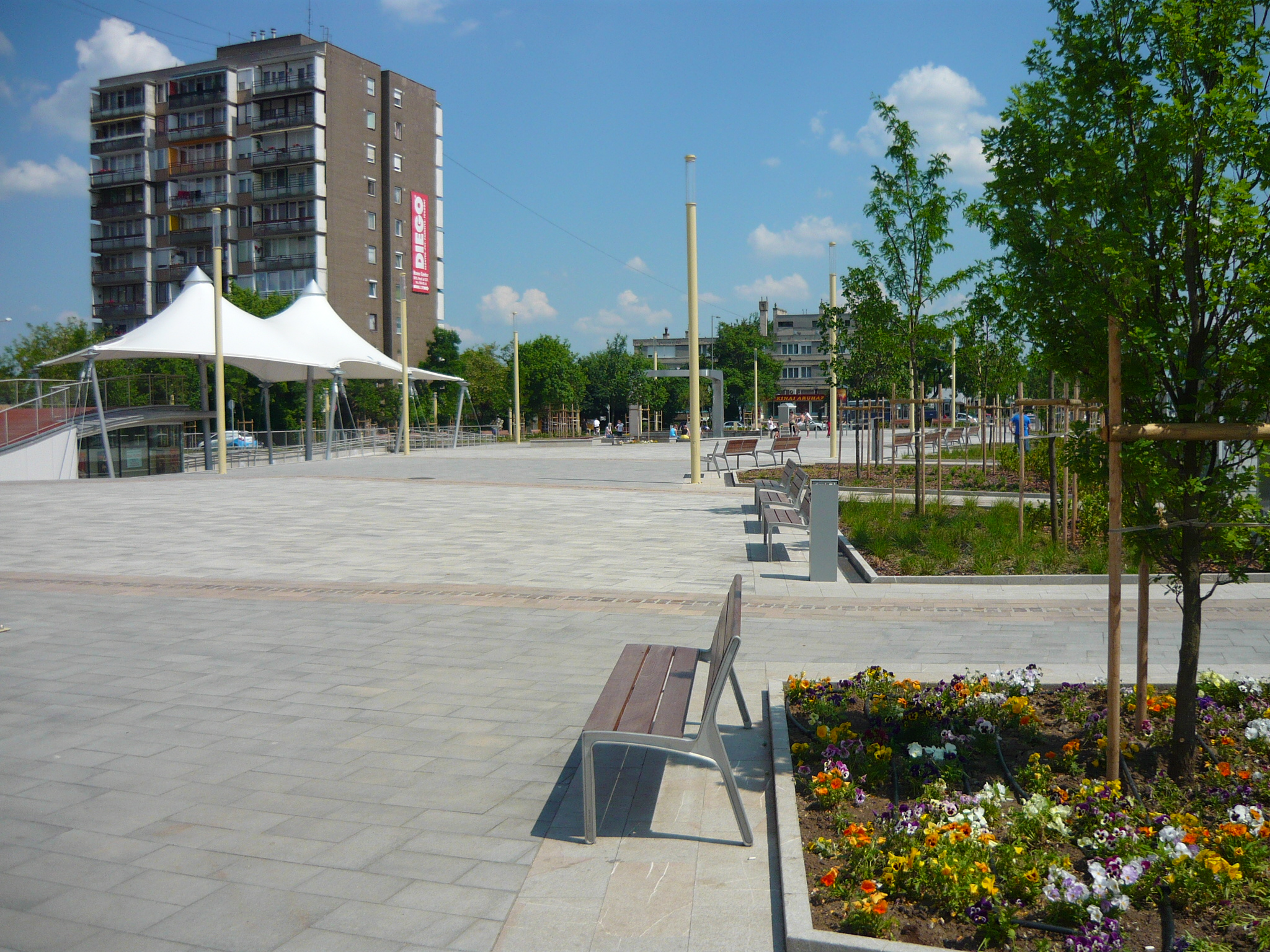
Renovated city center of the district

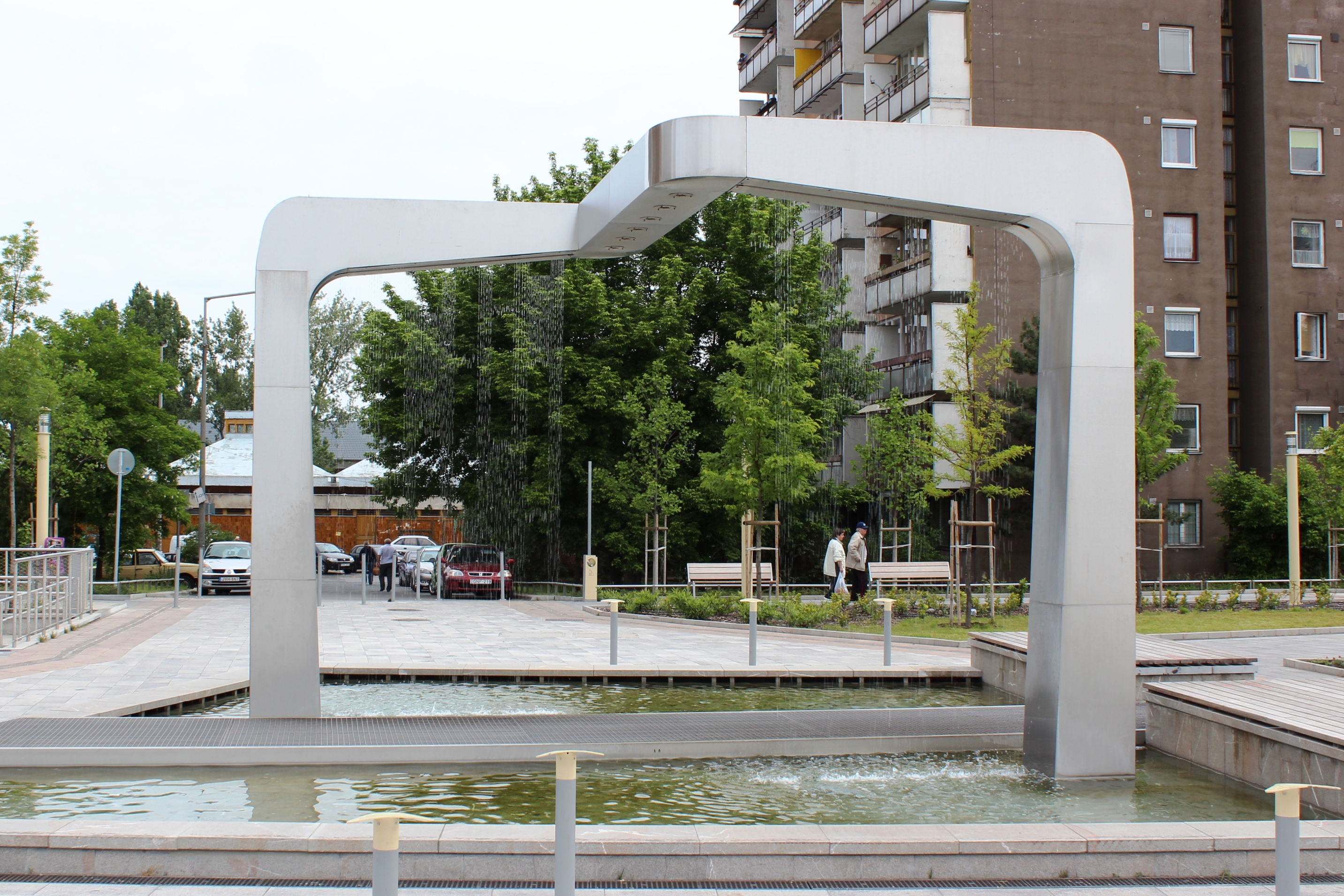
Waterwork in the Main Square of Rákosmente

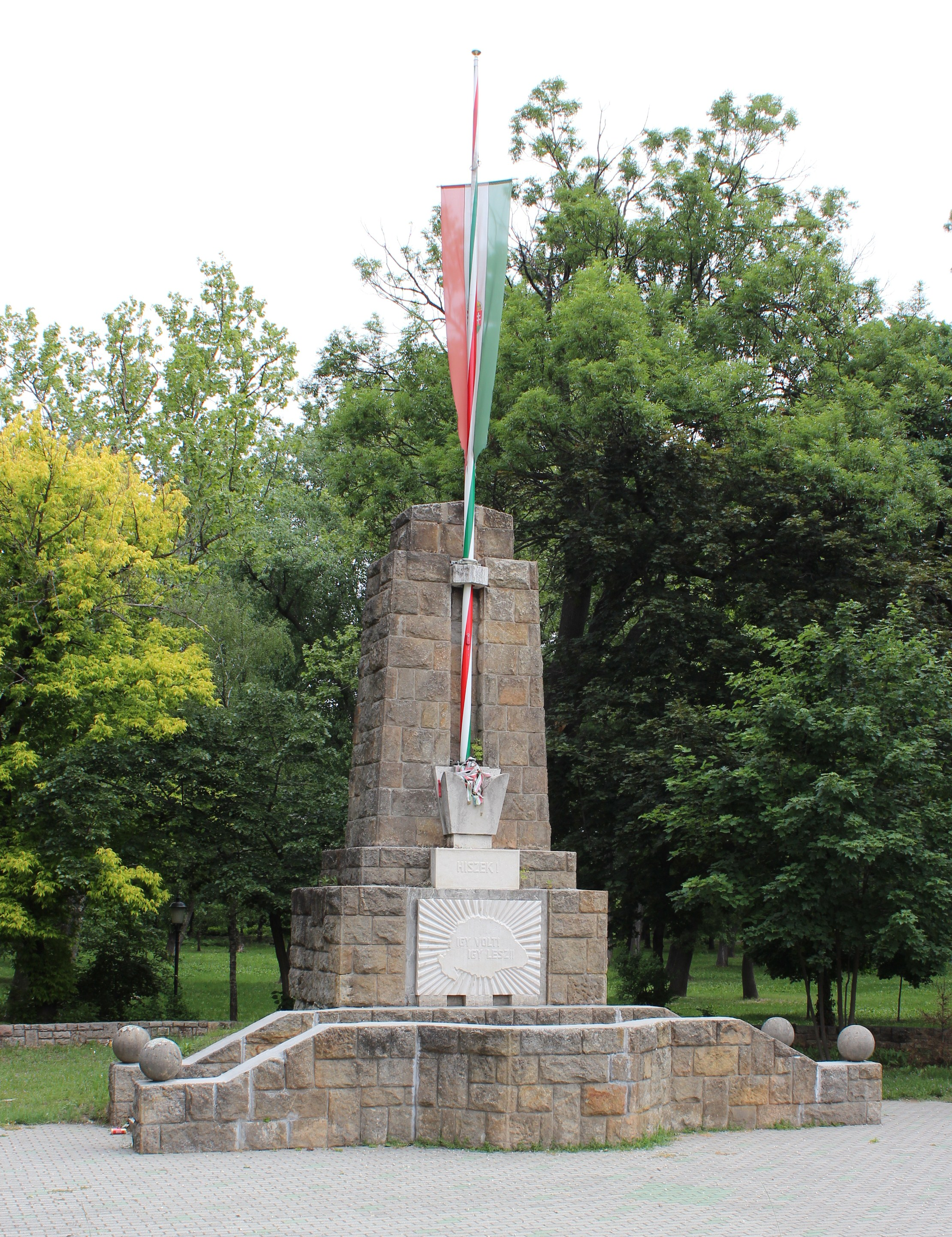
Trianon memorial along the Pesti út in People's Garden

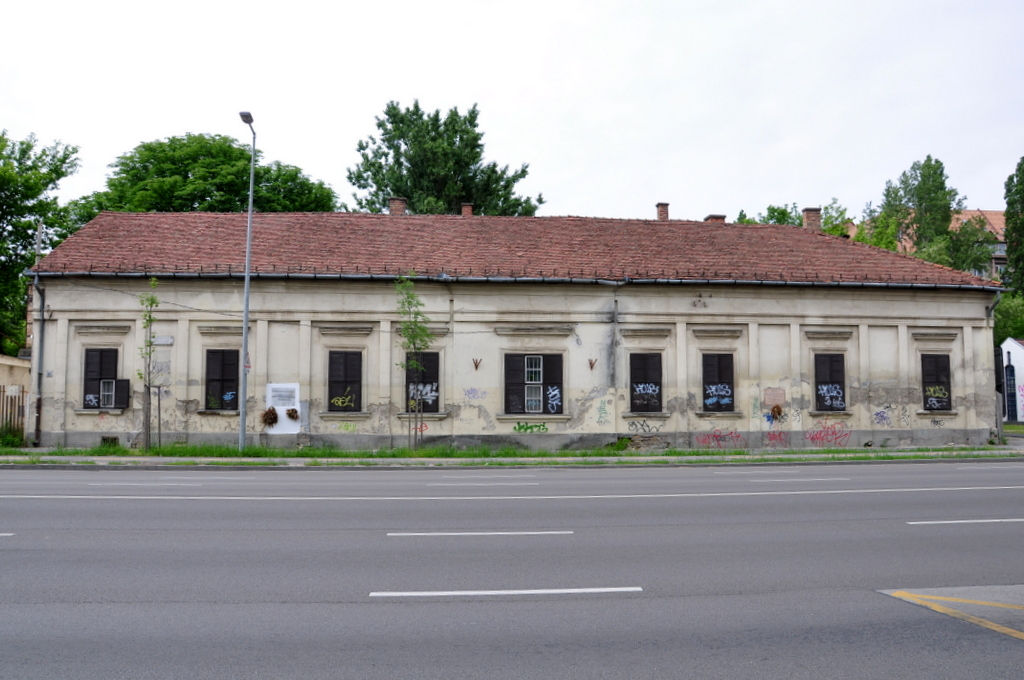
The currently abandoned Bulyovszky mansion, the birthplace of Gyula Bulyovszky, one of the leader of Hungarian Revolution of 1848

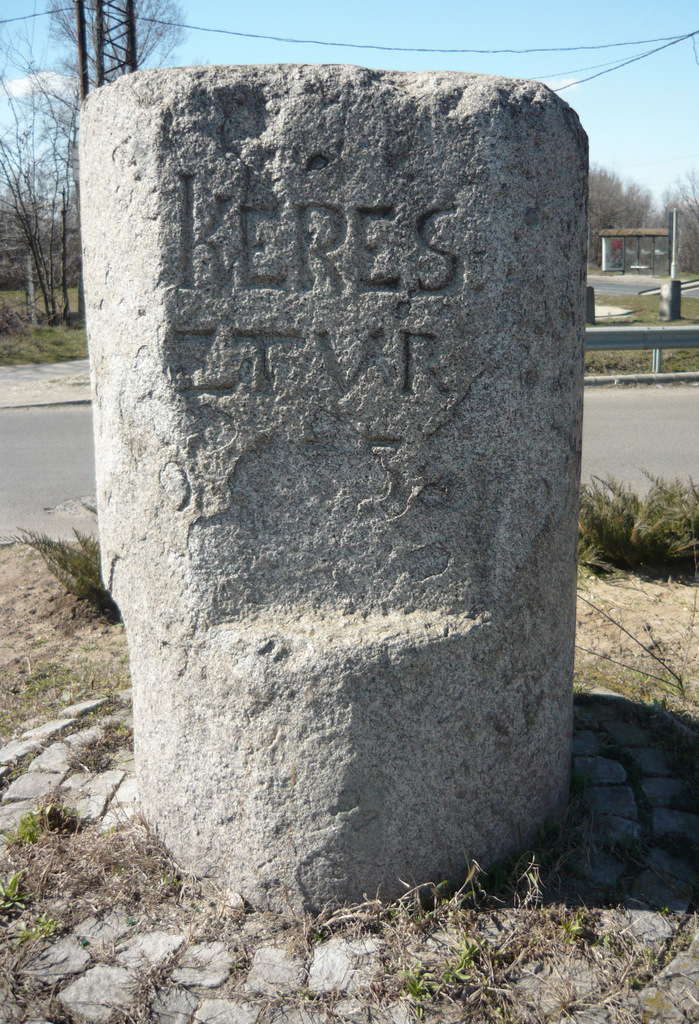
Rákoskeresztúr and Pest, Hungary borderstone from 1738 at Akadémiaújtelep neighbourhood

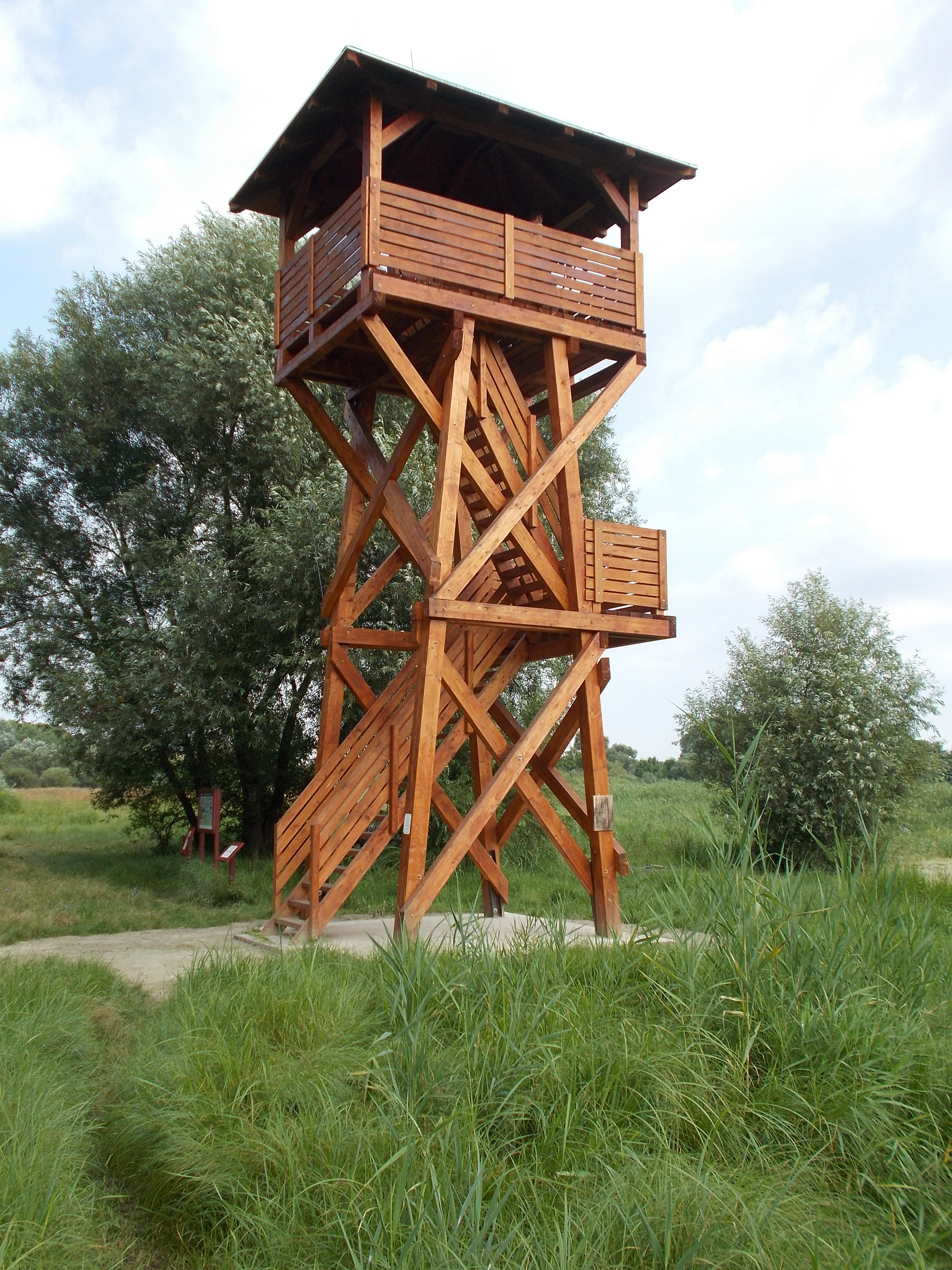
Birdwatching lookout at the fifth stop of the Merzse-marsh hiking trail

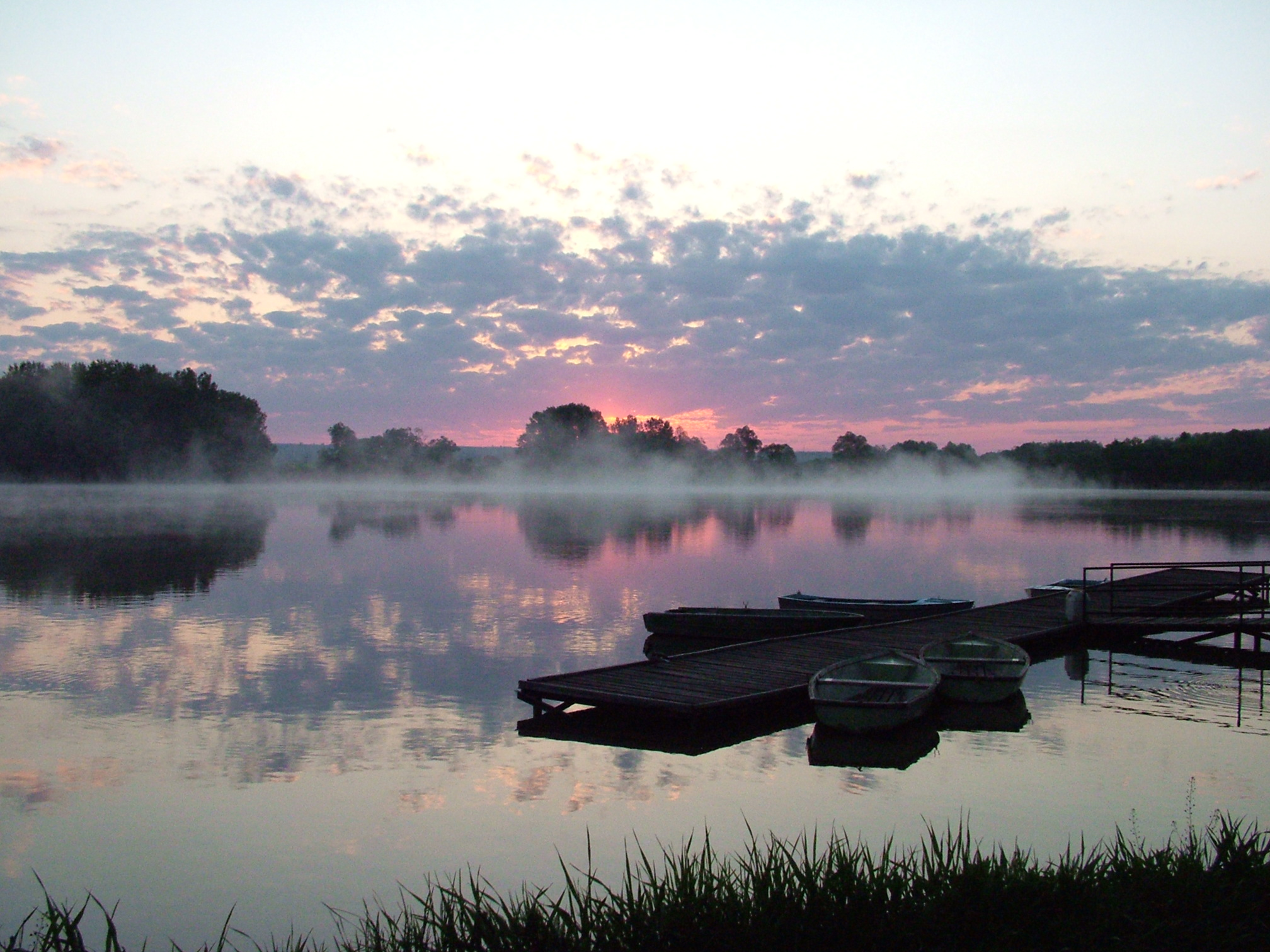
Lake Naplás

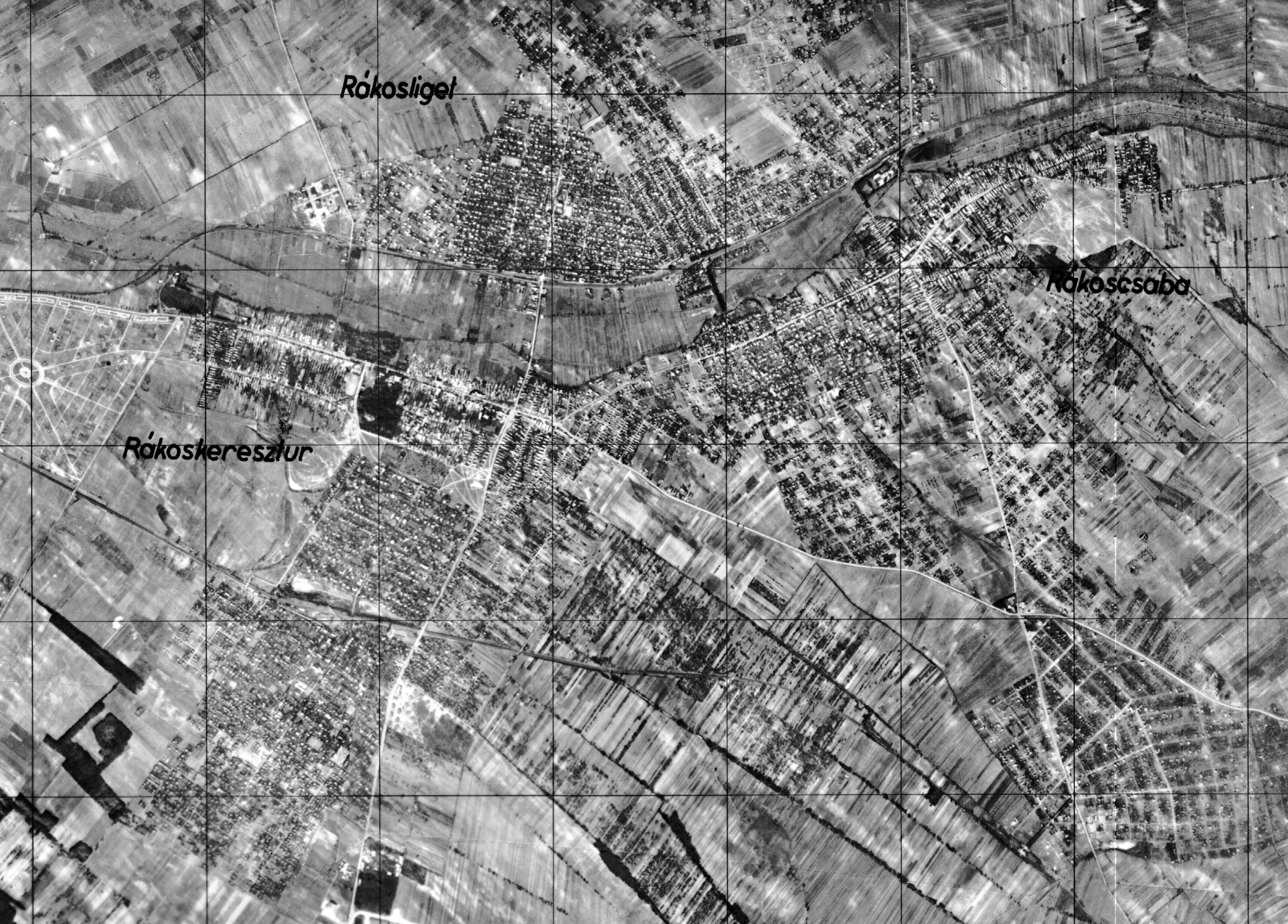
Rákosmente and its surroundings in a 1940 aerial photograph

== Notable people ==
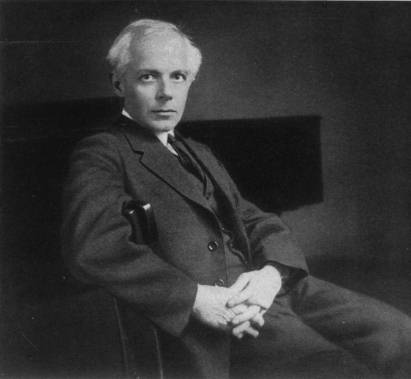
Béla Bartók, lived and composed from 1911 to 1920 in Rákosmente

- Csaba Abaházi, radio presenter
- Béla Bartók, composer, pianist, and ethnomusicologist
- Berky Lili, actress
- Ákos Buzsáky, football
- Renée Erdős, poet, novelist
- Gyula Gózon, actor
- György Kiss, Mihály Munkácsy Prize painter, sculptor, medalist
- Krencsey Marianne, actress
- Monika Laborcz, ceramicist
- Endre Mányoky, journalist
- Harghita Mecsek, sculptor and graphic artist
- Kristóf Nyíri, philosopher
- Gyula Radnai, physicist
- Elemér Ragályi, cameraman
- S. István Nagy, lyricist
- Béla Soós, reformed theologian, church historian
- István Szilágyi, actor
- László Bényi, painter
- Zoltán Sztancsek, geologist, superintendent of the city of Budapest, former director of the Department Museum
- Ferenc Vigyázó, Hungarian politician, member of the upper house, legal writer
- Jozsef Gregor, operatic bass
- Tibor Bitskey, actor
- János Kodolányi, writer
- László Rédei, mathematician
- Franz von Vecsey, violinist and composer virtuoso
