= Rákoskert =

Coordinates: 47°27′37″N 19°18′24″E

Rákoskert Kert
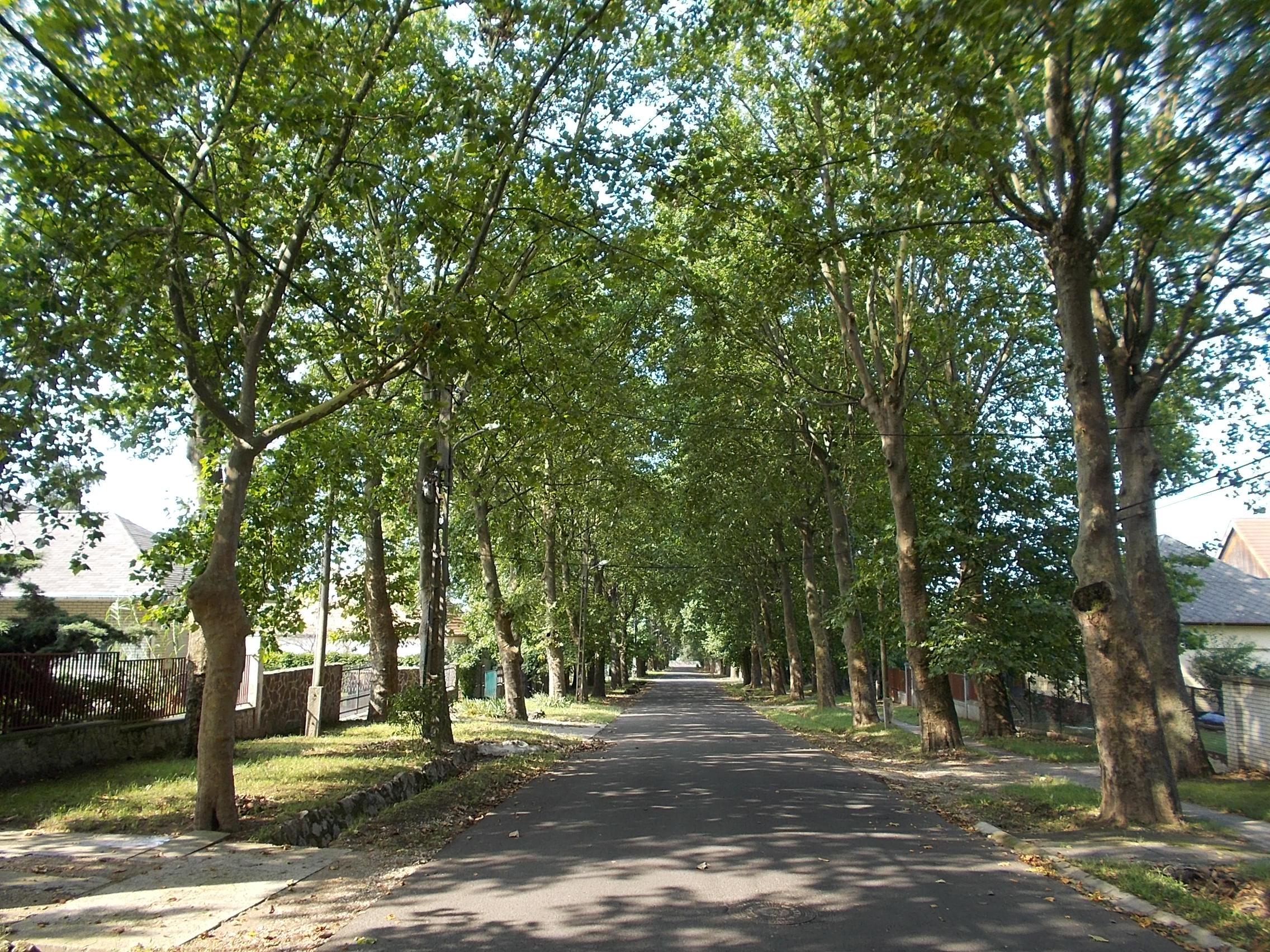
- Rákoskert Avenue

- Coat of arms
- Interactive map of Rákoskert
- Country: Hungary
- Region: Central Hungary
- City: Budapest
- District: Rákosmente
- Established: 19 February 1933

Population (2011)
  - Total: 9,372
- Time zone: UTC+1 (CET)
  - Summer (DST): UTC+2 (CEST)
- Postal code: 1171

Rákoskert is a former town in Hungary now part of District XVII of Budapest until it was united with Budapest on 1 January 1950. The population here is around 9372.

== Location ==
Rákoskert is located in District XVII of Budapest and lies between Ecser and Rákoshegy. An area is also included in the neighborhood known as Strázsahegy. Rákoskert is the easternmost and most distant part of Budapest; it is located on a road about 20 km from the zero milestone, so it is actually further away from the city center than some towns around Budapest such as: Érd, Biatorbágy or Dunakeszi. Even though most of the city is located on a plain, Rákoskert (and also as most of the XVII district) resembles a hilly area.

== History ==
The area on which present day Rákoskert lies has belonged to Rákoscsaba since the early Middle-ages. The name of Rákoscsaba is first mentioned in a charter dated 1267, which was a copy of another charter written in 1067.

The owner of the area, Baroness Gyuláné Schell, on the advice of Ferenc Füredi, the family's lawyer, decided that in order to settle her husband's debts and secure her livelihood in a way worthy of her rank, to subdivide the estate on (which lies on present day Rákoskert) and sell the individual plots. In January 1931, the plans were ready, the parcelling office was opened in one of the rented rooms of the Kucorgó Inn (today known as Kucorgó Square). The local government of Rákoscsaba approved the plans of Baroness Gyuláné Schell on February 19, 1933, so this day is considered to be the foundation of Rákoskert.

== Main sights too see ==
- Vidadomb (also known as Vida-domb): is a small hill (about 207 meters) located at the southern side of the neighborhood. From the top of the hill it is possible to observe the nearby Budapest Ferenc Liszt International Airport and Budapest's only marsh, the Merzse-marsh. The hill and the surrounding area is a popular location for concerts and small local festivals.
- Merzse-marsh: Budapest's last untouched marsh. The marsh itself is home to several endangered species of birds and plants. The marsh is prone to drying out especially nowadays, mainly due to warmer temperature and the nearby constructions.
