= Merzse-marsh =

Protected marsh in Budapest, Hungary

Coordinates: 47.450°N 19.278°E

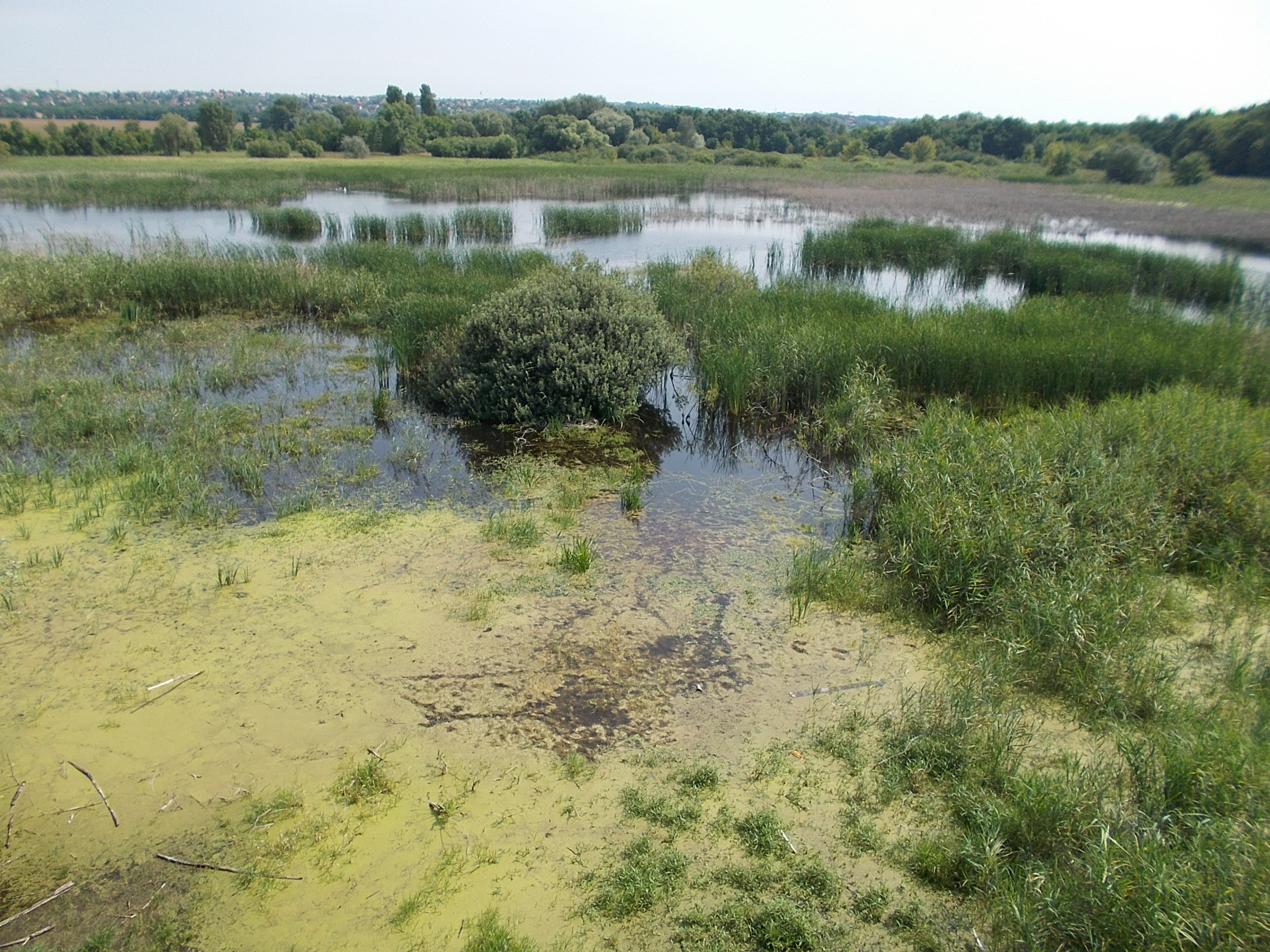
Merzse Marsh Nature Reserve

Merzse-marsh Nature Reserve (also known as Merse-marsh, or Merzse Marsh) is a nature reserve located at the eastern edge of Budapest, close to the Budapest Ferenc Liszt International Airport. It is one of the most undisturbed wetlands in Budapest.

== Location ==
The majority of the marsh lies in District XVII, close to Rákoskert neighborhood's trainstation. Even though it is located close to inhabited location, it is still not easily approachable as an about 15-minute hike is still required from the train station to reach the marsh. This likely explains why the marsh is still largely untouched.

== Marsh ==
The marsh itself is a fairly large area however the protected territory is only about 494,744 m^{2} (122 acres). Its area has been shrinking steadily since the early 19th century, and the water surface of the swamp today is only a few hundred square meters, a fraction of what was described in the eighties, which is also only a fraction of its original dimensions. This can be attributed to the general drought of recent decades as well as the transformation of the area and its surroundings (airport construction, construction of drainage ditches in agricultural areas, expansion of sewerage, which removed significant amounts of water from the catchment area). There were a few incidents in the past decade when the marsh couldn't regenerate itself.

The marsh is home to a very wide variety of plants, fish and birds, which is unique to Budapest. Such plants are Gymnadenia conopsea or the Cephalanthera longifolia. Notable animals are the following: european tree frog, Grey heron or the Little grebe.
