= Hijackers Bike Park =

Dirt bikepark in Hungary

Coordinates: 47.4843°N 19.2705°E

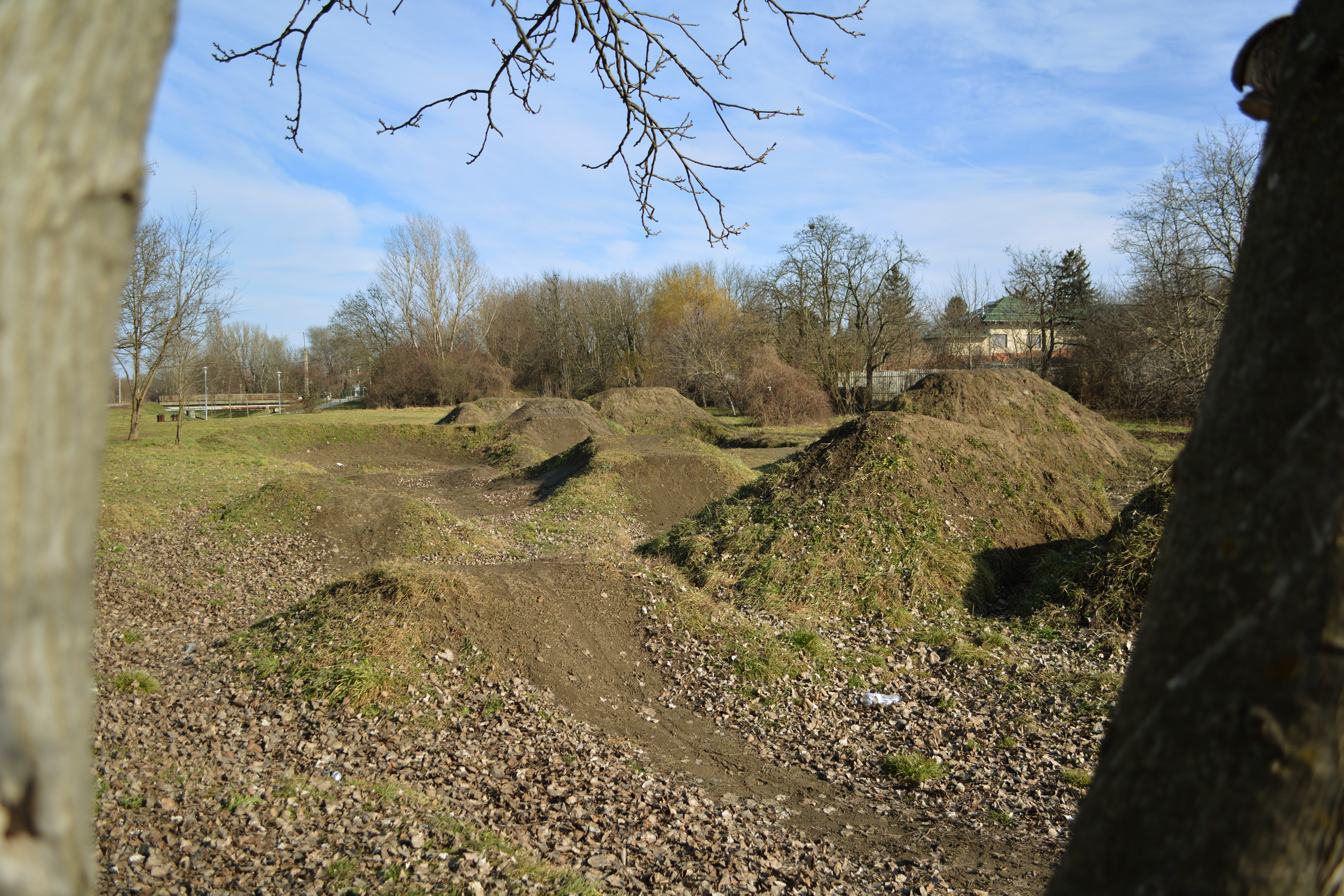
Hijackers Bike Park

HiJackers Bike Park is one of the biggest dirt bikeparks in Budapest, Hungary. The park was opened in 2013 in Budapest's 17th district, in Rákoscsaba. The opening of the park made it possible for its founders to practice their favourite sport dirt jump legally.

== The Park's Past ==
HiJackers Bike Park's history stretches back for years. In 2013 a group of local youths decided to establish a bike park in Rákoscsaba on an unbuilt parcel between Dunaszeg utca- Szabadság sugárút and the Rákospatak. The HiJackers crew first contacted two local foundations (Rákosmenti Testedző Kör, Kölyökkaland Alapítvány) which joined in the works connected to the parks establishment, and started transforming the above-mentioned area into a professional bike park. In a few months time an area of more than two acres was transformed into a shape suitable for practicing the sport. Soon a dream came true, the park was finally built as it was planned. As time went on the month June had arrived and HiJackers Bike Park officially opened its gates. Since then the bikers can fully enjoy their passion, and help others in getting to know the sport. The next milestone in the parks history was the Hijackers Dirt Jam which was organised on 27 September 2014. This was a competition between dozens of professional bikers. The event attracted viewers from many places across the country. Due to the huge success of the first Hijackers Dirt Jam a second one was organised on 5 September 2015. Despite the bad weather the second Hijackers Dirt Jam was also visited by a lot of people. In spring 2016 the founders of the park decided to make a smaller, so called pump track beside the bigger track where beginners can practice the sport. The smaller track only contains small waves and moderate turns. The beginners can learn the basics on this smaller track and it can also be used for competitions held for children.

== Transportation ==
The park is located beside the Rákospatak right beside a bicycle lane leading into central parts of Budapest. The park can also be approached by bus and it is also close to the Rákoscsaba train station. The park can be reached by getting of the following buses at the Szabadság sugárút bus station:

- from Kőbánya by buses 162, 201E, 262;
- from Örs vezér tere by buses 161, 169E;
- from Pécel by bus 169E;
- and at night by bus 990.
