= Jozsef Gregor =

Hungarian operatic bass (1940–2006)

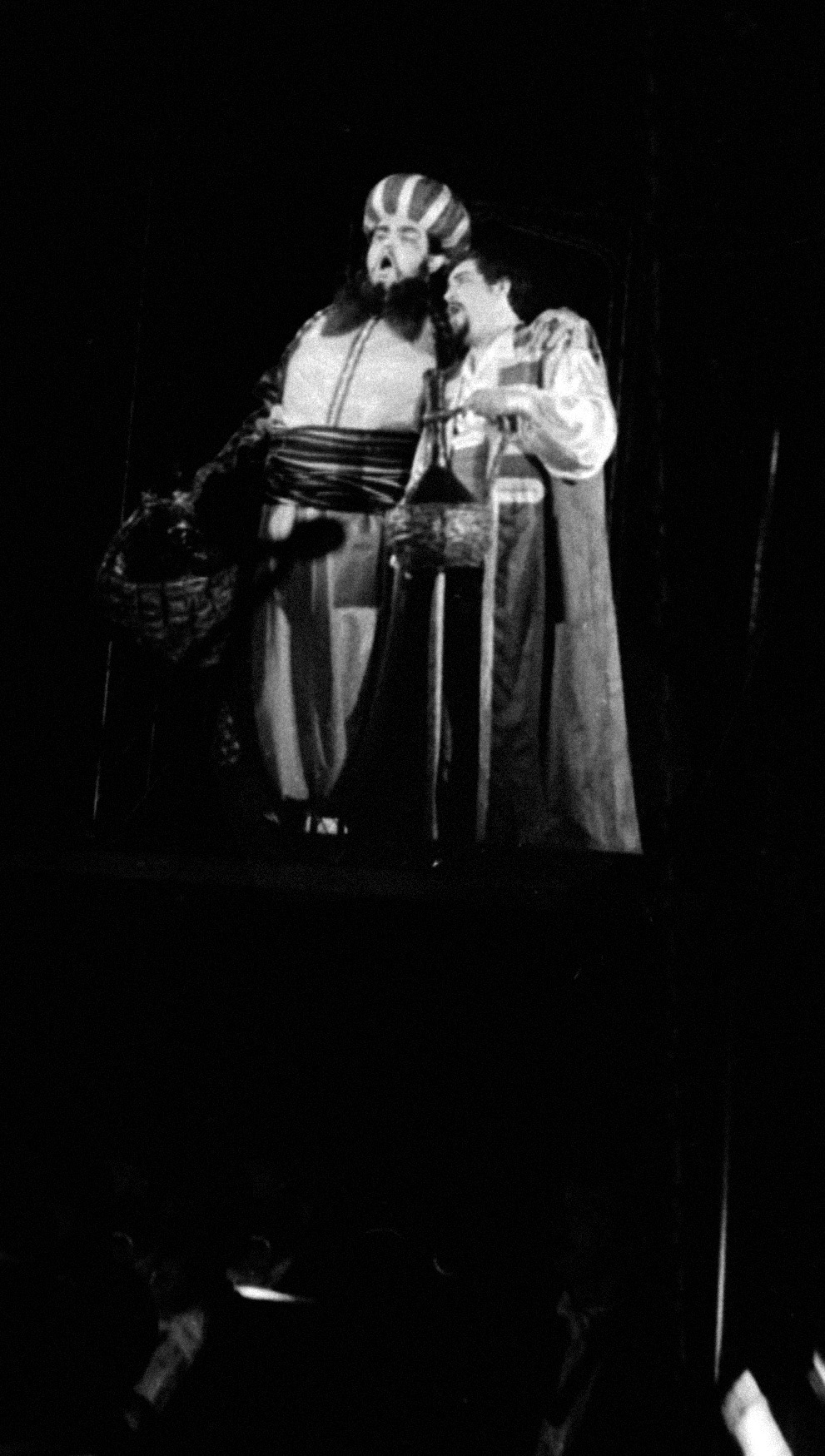
- Gregor and Sándor Bárdi. 1977
- Born: 8 August 1940; Rákosliget, Hungary (now Budapest)
- Died: 27 October 2006 (aged 66); Szeged, Hungary

József Gregor (8 August 1940 - 27 October 2006) was a renowned Hungarian operatic bass who enjoyed success first in Hungary, then in France, Belgium and Canada, and finally in the United States. Gregor was born in Rákosliget, a small town that is now part of Budapest. He studied violin for ten years and then, voice at the Liszt Academy in Budapest for one year but did not graduate. He started singing with the Hungarian Army chorus in 1958 before becoming a soloist in National Theatre of Szeged in Hungary. In Europe he sang in many opera houses, including Vlaamse Opera and La Scala in Milan. Beginning in 1989, József Gregor appeared in the US with the Portland Opera and later with the Houston Grand Opera (with Cecilia Bartoli at her American debut) and the Metropolitan Opera (with Bryn Terfel). His most famous roles included Sarastro, Osmin, Falstaff, Don Pasquale, Dulcamara, Don Basilio, Don Bartolo, Don Alfonso, Leporello, Don Magnifico, Boris Godunov, Gremin, Varlaam, Gianni Schicchi, Philip II, Banquo, Attila, Pagano, Fiesco, Mephistofeles, Bluebeard etc., roles in masses and oratorios, musicals (Tevye, Caiaphas), and songs. He died in Szeged of gastric cancer.

József Gregor made many recordings. They were with Arts Music, Sony Classical and, particularly, the Hungarian state label Hungaroton. In 1996, he met Andras Ruszanov who wrote a Hungarian lyrics version of Comme d'habitude / My Way for him. József Gregor went to a studio and made a record this song titled Az én utam directed by Péter Wolf. József Gregor performed Az én utam in one of the most popular TV show in Budapest, since then this version has been permanently on the playlists of numerous radio stations in Hungary.
