= Rákosliget =

Part of the 17th district of Budapest, Hungary

Coordinates: 47°29′25″N 19°15′36″E

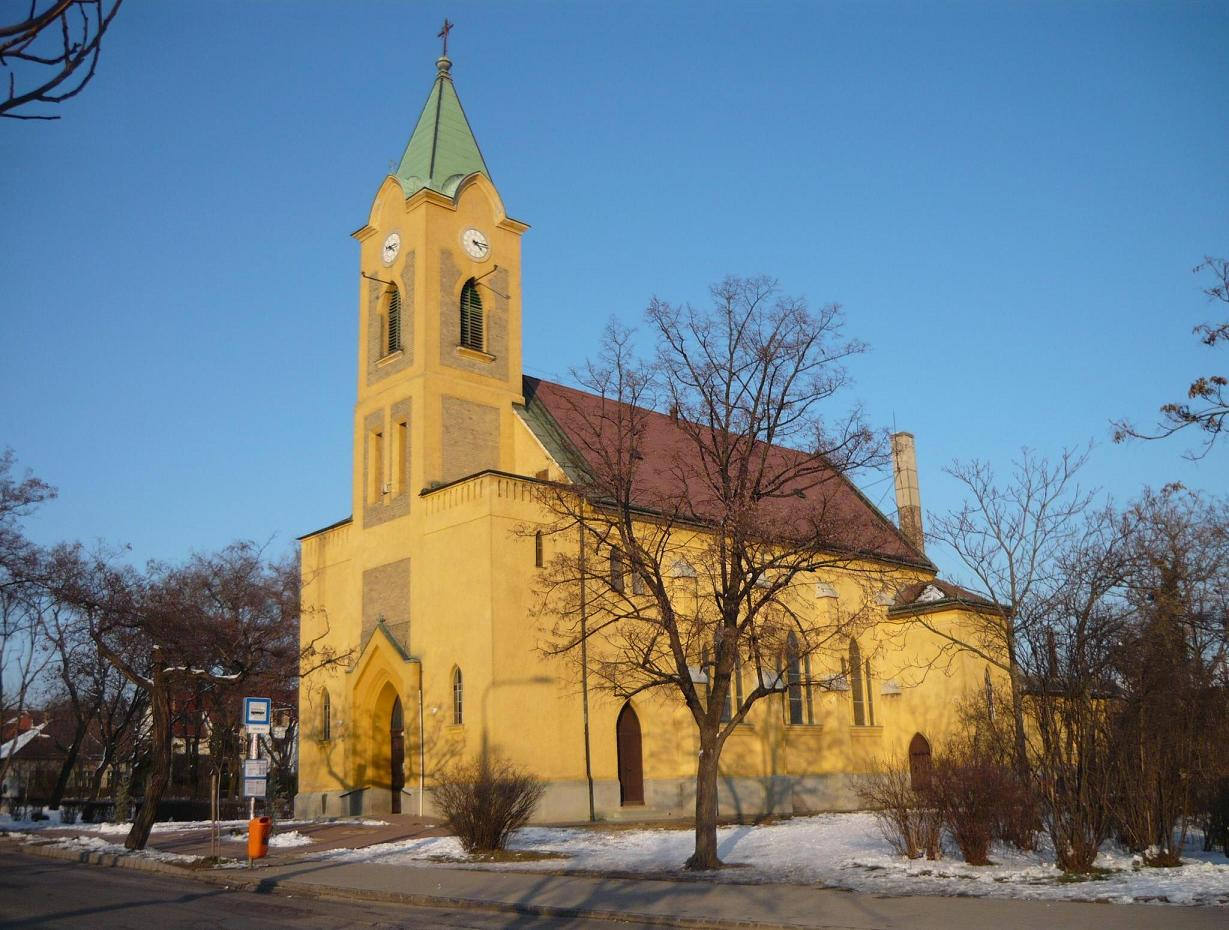
Magyarok Nagyasszonya Roman Catholic church

Rákosliget is a part of the 17th district of Budapest since January 1, 1950. It is known to locals as 'Liget'

== History ==
In 1896 The Workmen's Insurance Society (Munkásbiztosító Pénztár) started to build a homes for workmen in an unpopulated neighbourhood of Rákoskeresztúr. The founders were unable to finance the constructions so the homes were eventually bought by middle-class families mainly of merchants, civil servants, and craftsmen. The growing settlement became independent of Rákoskeresztúr( 1907 ). In 1930 it had a population of 3112 inhabitants and the number of craftsmen was over 100. Its main street that comes from Rákoskeresztúr called Ferihegyi street divides it into two parts indicated by the numbering of the surrounding streets: on the left there are streets identified by Roman odd numbers (I., III., V., etc. utca) whereas on the right are the even numbered streets (II., IV., etc. utca). A common local witticism is to call these streets "avenues" referring to the similar street numbering of New York, for example: V. utca=Fifth Avenue. Rákosliget was attached to Budapest on 1 January 1950 as part of the 17th district.

== Culture ==
Rákosliget has its own theatre named after Gyula Gózon, a famous Hungarian actor who lived there. It also has its own community center called Csekovszky Árpád Művelődési Ház.

== Famous Ligeti people ==
- Gózon Gyula (great Hungarian actor)
- Csekovszky Árpád (ceramist)
- Gregor József (well-known Hungarian bass opera singer)

== See also ==
- Rákosmente
