= Lake Naplás =

Artificial lake in Budapest, Hungary

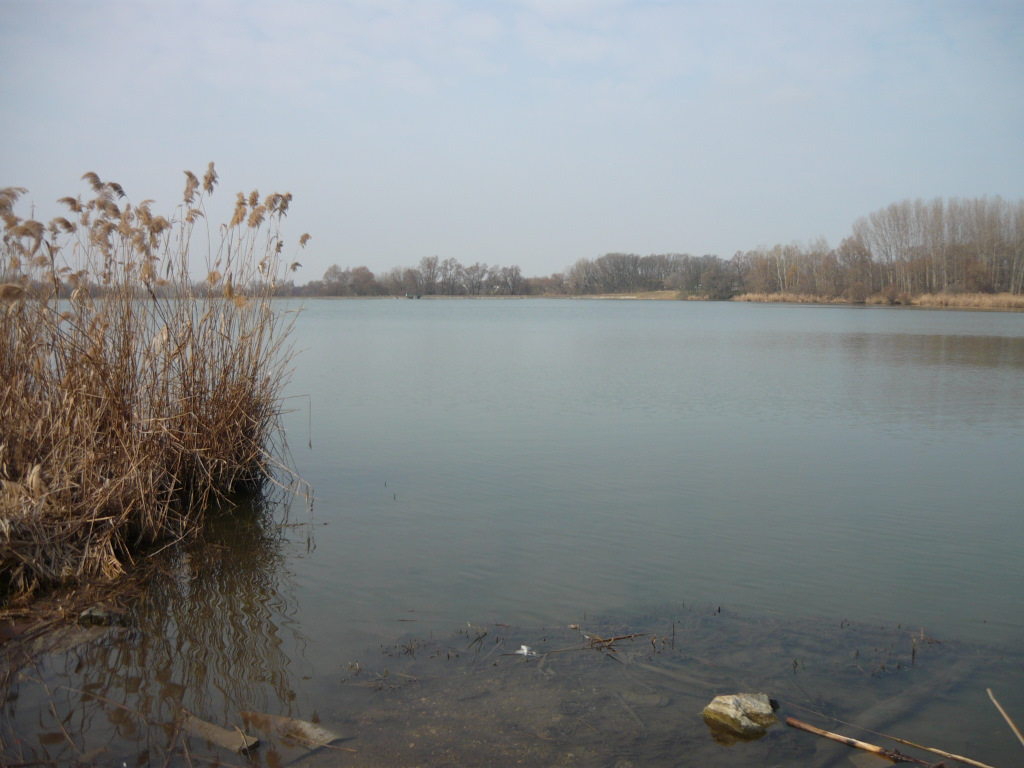

- Location within Hungary
- Location: Budapest, 16th district
- Coordinates: 47°30′34″N 19°14′47″E
- Primary inflows: Szilas-patak
- Primary outflows: Szilas-patak
- Basin countries: Hungary
- Surface area: 16 hectares (40 acres)
- Settlements: Budapest

Lake Naplás (Hungarian: Naplás-tó, officially called Szilas-pataki flood control reservoir) is the largest lake of Budapest. The lake is artificial, surrounded by the second largest natural reserve of Budapest, including a moorland and a forest. Rare flora and fauna could be found here, therefore it has been a protected since 1997. It is the natural habitat of the European pond turtle. The lake itself is a fishing lake, but there are hiking and biking trails around it. It can be reached from the city by car or bike, or by the nearby public transportation.
