= Rákoskeresztúr =

Coordinates: 47°29′N 19°15′E

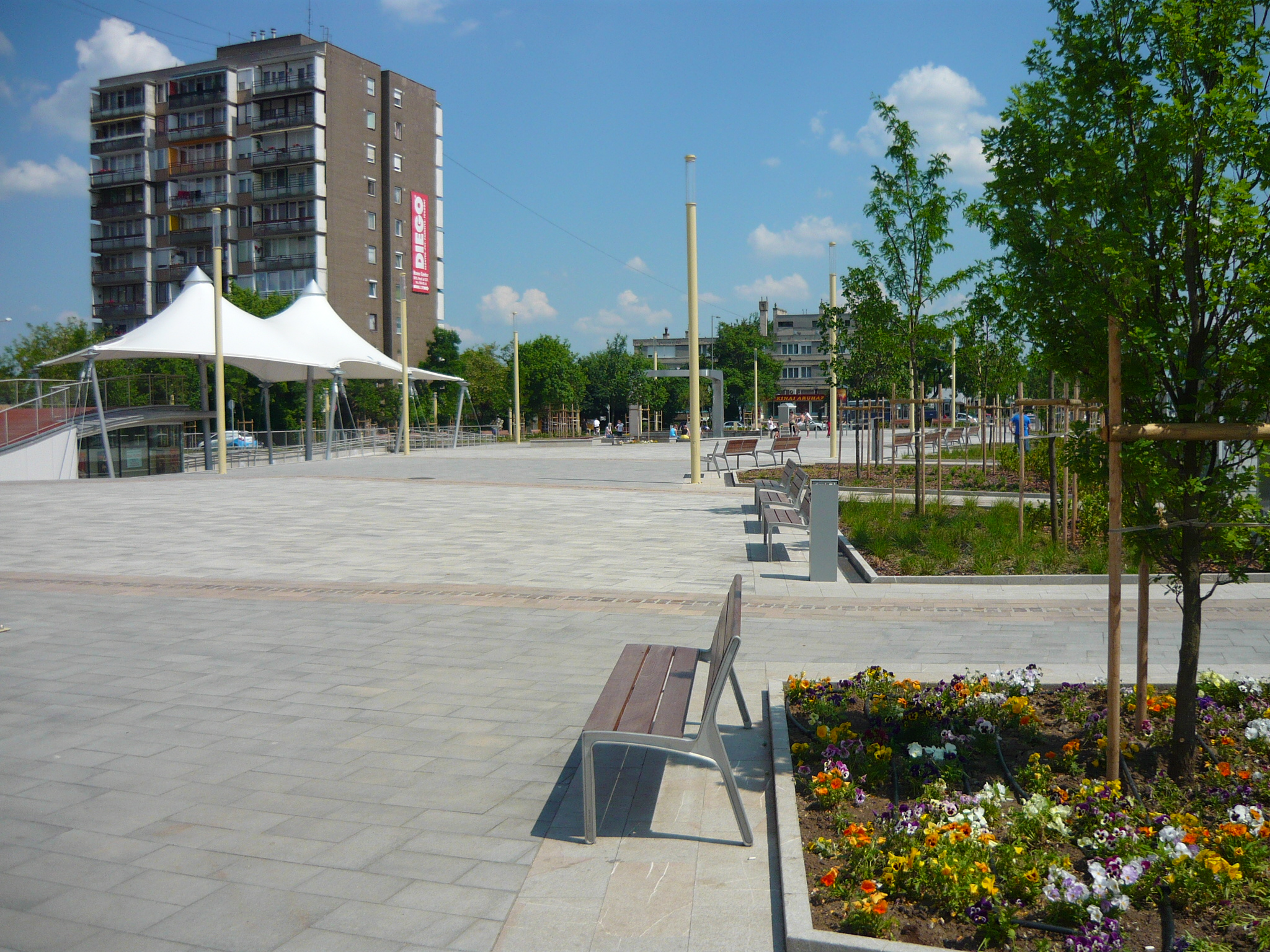
Rákoskeresztúr town centre

Rákoskeresztúr (German: Gerersdorf) is a former town in Hungary now part of District XVII of Budapest. Rákoskeresztúr was united with Budapest on January 1, 1950.

== Background ==
The first written mark (the name Pousarakusa, in modern Hungarian Pósarákosa) was a title-deed written in 1265. The name was given by the region's first occupant. In that title-deed the region was given to the Crusaders of Upper-Heviz. The village was almost destroyed in the Turkish assault. In 1662, only eight peasant- and 2 cotter families lived in it. From 1727 to 1950, it was counted as a town. In 1880, Rákoshegy and Rákosliget are cut off from Rákoskeresztúr. In 1950, Rákoskeresztúr, Rákoshegy, Rákosliget and the newly built Rákoskert were joined together as the XVII. district of Budapest.
