= Rákoscsaba =

Coordinates: 47°29′N 19°17′E

Rákoscsaba is a former town in Hungary now part of District XVII of Budapest. Rákoscsaba was united with Budapest on 1 January 1950. The Hijackers Bike Park was opened in 2013 in Rákoscsaba.

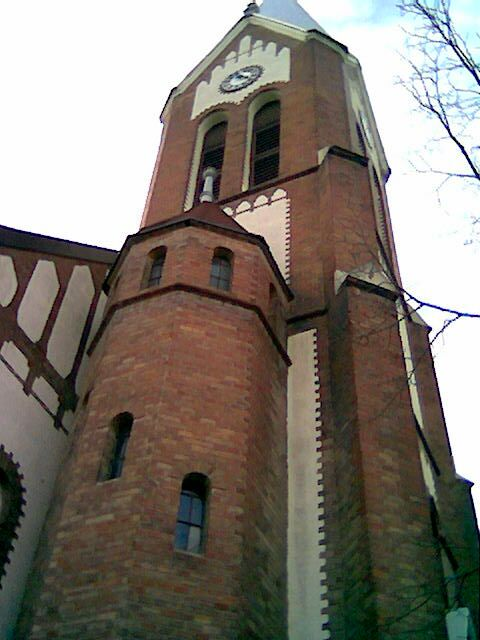
The Calvinist church of Rákoscsaba

== See also ==
- Rákosmente
- Budapest
