= Proceedings of the Institution of Mechanical Engineers =

- Discipline: Mechanical engineering
- Language: English

Publication details
- History: 1847–present
- Publisher: Institution of Mechanical Engineers (United Kingdom)

Standard abbreviations
- ISO 4: Proc. Inst. Mech. Eng.

Indexing
- CODEN: PIMLAA
- LCCN: 08018925

Links
- Journal homepage; Online access

The Proceedings of the Institution of Mechanical Engineers were first published by the Institution of Mechanical Engineers (IMechE) in 1847. The Proceedings were published under this single title until 1963, when they began to be published in two parts. The Proceedings have since expanded further, in part by incorporating four journals previously published separately: the Proceedings of the Institution of Automobile Engineers (in 1971), the Journal of the Institution of Locomotive Engineers (in 1971), the Journal of Mechanical Engineering Science (in 1983) and Engineering in Medicine (in 1989). Sixteen individual parts now make up the Proceedings, as follows:

- Part A: Journal of Power and Energy
- Part B: Journal of Engineering Manufacture
- Part C: Journal of Mechanical Engineering Science
- Part D: Journal of Automobile Engineering
- Part E: Journal of Process Mechanical Engineering
- Part F: Journal of Rail and Rapid Transit
- Part G: Journal of Aerospace Engineering
- Part H: Journal of Engineering in Medicine
- Part I: Journal of Systems and Control Engineering
- Part J: Journal of Engineering Tribology
- Part K: Journal of Multi-body Dynamics
- Part L: Journal of Materials: Design and Applications
- Part M: Journal of Engineering for the Maritime Environment
- Part N: Journal of Nanoengineering and Nanosystems
- Part O: Journal of Risk and Reliability
- Part P: Journal of Sports Engineering and Technology

In 2010, SAGE Publications began publishing the Institution's journals on behalf of the IMechE.

== Abstracting and indexing ==
As of May 2011, 14 of the journals that make up the Proceedings were included in the Journal Citation Reports.
