= List of engineering journals and magazines =

This is a representative list of academic journals and magazines in engineering and its various subfields.

== Aerospace engineering ==
- Aviation Week & Space Technology
- Flight International
- Journal of Astronomical Telescopes, Instruments, and Systems
- Space.com

== Biomedical engineering ==
- Annual Review of Biomedical Engineering
- Biomechanics and Modeling in Mechanobiology
- Biomedical Microdevices
- Biotechnology and Bioengineering
- Biotechnology and Bioprocess Engineering
- Critical Reviews in Biomedical Engineering

== Civil engineering ==
- International Journal of Civil Engineering
- Journal of Structural Engineering
- SAICE Journal

== Chemical engineering ==
- Chemical & Engineering News
- Chemical Engineering
- Oil & Gas Journal
- Process Engineering

== Electrical and electronic engineering ==
- EDN
- EE Times
- Electronic Design
- IEEE Spectrum
- IEEE Wireless Communications
- New Electronics
- Radioelectronics and Communications Systems

== Mechanical engineering ==
- Acta Mechanica et Automatica
- International Journal of Machine Tools and Manufacture

=== Heat transfer, fluid flow, and energy ===
- Energy & Environment
- Journal of Heat and Mass Transfer Research
- International Journal for Numerical Methods in Fluids
- Journal of Fluid Mechanics

=== Solid mechanics ===
- International Journal of Fracture

== Mining engineering ==
- Acta Geotechnica
- Engineering Geology
- International Journal of Rock Mechanics and Mining Sciences
- Journal of Mining Science
- Mining Engineering

== Nuclear engineering ==
- Annals of Nuclear Energy
- IEEE Transactions on Nuclear Science
- Journal of Nuclear Materials
- Plasma Physics and Controlled Fusion
- Progress in Nuclear Energy

== Structural engineering ==
- Computers and Structures
- Contemporary Architecture
- Fire Safety Journal
- International Journal of Reliability, Quality and Safety Engineering
- Journal of Fire Protection Engineering
- Quantitative InfraRed Thermography Journal
- Structural and Multidisciplinary Optimization
- Strength of Materials

== Hobby, practical and light engineering ==
- American Machinist
- Model Engineer
- Model Engineers' Workshop
- Modern Machine Shop

== Other areas ==
=== Mechatronics ===
- International Journal of Robotics Research

=== Petroleum engineering ===
- Petroleum News

=== Wind turbine engineering ===
- Windpower Monthly

== By publisher ==
=== IET publications ===
The Institution of Engineering and Technology publishes various magazines and journals:

- Engineering and Technology Magazine
- IET Software

=== IEEE publications ===
The Institute of Electrical and Electronics Engineers publishes various chimps and magazines.

== See also ==
- Journal of Engineering Education
- Lists of academic journals
- List of computer books
- List of computer magazines
- List of engineering educational software
- List of engineering schools
- Lists of engineers
- Lists of engineering software
