= List of mechanical engineering journals =

List of academic journals in mechanical engineering

This is a list of mechanical engineering journals which includes peer-reviewed scientific journals that cover research in mechanical systems, acoustics, thermodynamics, electromechanics, fluid mechanics, manufacturing, robotics, and other related fields.

== Journals ==
- Applied Mechanics Reviews
- ASCE-ASME Journal of Risk and Uncertainty in Engineering Systems
- Experimental Mechanics
- Heat and Mass Transfer
- International Journal of Extreme Manufacturing
- International Journal of Heat and Mass Transfer
- International Journal of Machine Tools and Manufacture
- International Journal of Plasticity
- Jordan Journal of Mechanical and Industrial Engineering
- Journal of Computational and Nonlinear Dynamics
- Journal of Fluid Mechanics
- Journal of Heat and Mass Transfer Research
- Journal of Microelectromechanical Systems
- Journal of Micro/Nanopatterning, Materials, and Metrology
- Journal of Sound and Vibration
- Mechanism and Machine Theory
- Meccanica
- Proceedings of the Institution of Mechanical Engineers, Part C: Journal of Mechanical Engineering Science
- Proceedings of the Institution of Mechanical Engineers, Part L

== See also ==
- American Society for Precision Engineering
- International Conference on Robotics and Automation
- Lists of academic journals
- List of American Society of Mechanical Engineers academic journals
- List of engineering awards
- List of aerospace engineering journals
- List of engineering journals and magazines
- List of materials science journals
- List of mechanical engineering software
- List of physics journals
- List of scientific journals
- Mechanical engineering
