= Acta Mechanica et Automatica =

- Discipline: Mechanics, Automation, Robotics
- Language: English
- Edited by: Michał Kuciej

Publication details
- History: 2007–present
- Publisher: Bialystok University of Technology (Poland)
- Frequency: Quarterly
- Open access: Yes
- Impact factor: 1.1

Standard abbreviations
- ISO 4: Acta Mech. Autom.

Indexing
- ISSN: 1898-4088 (print); 2300-5319 (web)

Links
- Journal homepage

Acta Mechanica et Automatica is an English-language peer-reviewed open access scientific journal that publishes theoretical and experimental articles on all aspects of mechanics, automation and robotics. The journal was founded in 2007 at the Faculty of Mechanical Engineering of Bialystok University of Technology. As of 2024, the journal has an impact factor of 1.1 and a Scopus CiteScore of 1.8.

== Publication process ==
The publication frequency is 4 issues per year. Each issue includes about 20 articles. Authors are not required to pay an article processing charge. Before acceptance for publication, a submitted manuscript undergoes a plagiarism check and a double-blind peer review by two reviewers. The manuscript rejection rate is 53%.

== Editorial and scientific board ==
The editor-in-chief of the journal is Michał Kuciej (from 2025), Krzysztof Jan Kurzydłowski (2021–2024), Andrzej Seweryn (2007–2021). The scientific board consists of more than 50 scientists from Belarus, Canada, Czech Republic, China, Estonia, France, Germany, Hungary, India, Italy, Japan, Lithuania, Poland, Portugal, Slovakia, Spain, Turkey, Ukraine, United Kingdom, United States, including Filippo Berto, Leszek F. Demkowicz, Giancarlo Genta, Mark Kachanov, Tadeusz Kaczorek, Zenon Mróz, Agnes Muszyńska, Martin Ostoja-Starzewski.

== Abstracting and indexing ==
The journal is abstracted and indexed in a number of scientific databases including:

- Arianta
- Baidu Scholar
- BazTech
- CNKI Scholar
- CNPIEC – cnpLINKer
- Dimensions
- EBSCO Information Services
- Elsevier – Reaxys
- Ex Libris Group
- Google Scholar
- Index Copernicus
- JST
- J-Gate
- JournalGuide
- JournalTOCs
- KESLI-NDSL
- MyScienceWork
- Naver Academic
- Naviga
- POL-index
- QOAM
- ReadCube
- SCILIT
- Scopus
- Semantic Scholar
- SHERPA/RoMEO
- TDNet
- TEMA Technik und Management
- Ulrichsweb
- WanFang Data
- Web of Science
- WorldCat
- X-MOL
