= Lists of academic journals =

The following is a partial list of lists of academic journals.

== Lists of journals ==
=== By topic ===
- List of academic journals about specific authors
- List of accounting journals
- List of aerospace engineering journals
- List of African studies journals
- List of agricultural journals
- List of anarchist periodicals
- List of anthropology journals
- List of arachnology journals
- List of architecture journals
- List of artificial intelligence journals
- List of astronomy journals
- List of bioethics journals
- List of bioinformatics journals
- List of biology journals
- List of botany journals
- List of business journals
- List of chemistry journals
- List of civil engineering journals
- List of computer graphics journals
- List of computer science journals
- List of cryptography journals
- List of data science journals
- List of dental journals
- List of earth and atmospheric sciences journals
- List of economics journals
- List of education journals
- List of educational psychology journals
- List of electrical engineering journals
- List of engineering journals and magazines
- List of entomology journals
- List of environmental economics journals
- List of environmental journals
- List of environmental social science journals
- List of ethics journals
- List of fluid mechanics journals
- List of forestry journals
- List of geology journals
- List of healthcare journals
- List of history journals
- List of humanities journals
- List of humor research publications
- List of information systems journals
- List of intellectual property law journals
- List of international business journals
- List of international law journals
- List of international relations journals
- List of law journals
  - List of law reviews in the United States
- List of linguistics journals
- List of literary magazines
- List of logic journals
- List of materials science journals
- List of mathematics education journals
- List of mathematics journals
- List of mechanical engineering journals
- List of medical and health informatics journals
- List of medical journals
- List of mining journals
- List of monetary policy journals
- List of music and musicology journals
- List of mycology journals
- List of nanotechnology journals
- List of neuroscience journals
- List of nuclear science journals
- List of nursing journals
- List of ornithology journals
- List of pharmaceutical sciences journals
- List of philosophy journals
- List of physics journals
- List of planning journals
- List of political science journals
- List of probability journals
- List of psychiatry journals
- List of psychology journals
- List of psychotherapy journals
- List of public administration journals
- List of public relations journals
- List of quantum computing journals
- List of radar journals
- List of renewable energy journals
- List of robotics journals
- List of scientific journals
- List of semiconductor journals
- List of sexology journals
- List of Slavic studies journals
- List of social science journals
- List of sociology journals
- List of software programming journals
- List of statistics journals
- List of systems science journals
- List of textile science journals
- List of theology journals
- List of transportation and logistics journals
- List of undergraduate research journals
- List of women's studies journals
- List of zoology journals

=== By country ===
- List of 18th-century British periodicals
- List of 19th-century British periodicals
- List of academic journals published in Serbia
- List of journals published by Sri Lankan universities

=== By publisher ===
- List of American Medical Association journals
- List of Annual Reviews journals
- List of Cambridge University Press journals
- List of Elsevier periodicals
- List of IEEE publications
- List of Johns Hopkins University Press journals
- List of MIT Press journals
- List of Oxford University Press journals
- List of Penn State Press journals
- List of Royal Society of Chemistry journals
- List of University of California Press journals
- List of University of Chicago Press journals
- List of University of Texas Press journals

=== By accessibility ===
- List of open-access journals

=== By chronology ===
- List of early-modern periodicals
- List of journals appearing under the French Revolution
- List of 18th-century journals
- List of 18th-century British periodicals
- List of 19th-century British periodicals

=== By policy ===
- List of academic publishers by preprint policy

== Published lists ==
- Guide to Reference
- International Catalogue of Scientific Literature
- Journal Citation Reports
- Ulrich's Periodicals Directory

== See also ==
- Academic journal
- Academic publishing
- Academic writing
- List of academic databases and search engines
- Lists of books
- Lists of magazines
- List of Nature Research journals
- List of science magazines
- List of trade magazines
- Lists of engineers
- Open access journal
- Open Journal Systems
- Peer review
- Scientific journal
- Scientific literature

=== Open Science Platforms (Open Repositories) ===
- arXiv – open-access repository of electronic preprints and postprints (known as e-prints)
- Zenodo – open repository developed under the European OpenAIRE program and operated by CERN
- Figshare – open data and software hosting
- HAL (open archive) – open archive where authors can deposit scholarly documents from all academic fields
- Dryad (repository) – data and software related to science papers
- Open Science Framework – project management and sharing platform
