= List of radar journals =

This is a list of radar journals of academic and professional periodicals that publish research related to radar technology, signal processing, remote sensing, and associated navigation and detection systems.

== General radar and signal processing ==
- Advances in Radio Science
- EURASIP Journal on Advances in Signal Processing
- IEEE Transactions on Aerospace and Electronic Systems
- IEEE Transactions on Antennas and Propagation
- IEEE Transactions on Geoscience and Remote Sensing
- IEEE Transactions on Signal Processing
- IEEE Transactions on Radar Systems
- IET Radar, Sonar & Navigation
- Progress in Electromagnetics Research
- Radio Science (journal)

== Remote sensing and radar imaging ==
- Canadian Journal of Remote Sensing
- International Journal of Remote Sensing
- ISPRS Journal of Photogrammetry and Remote Sensing
- Journal of Applied Remote Sensing
- Remote Sensing (journal)

== Defense and applied radar systems ==
- Journal of Electronic Defense
- Sensors

== Navigation and positioning ==
- Navigation (journal)

== See also ==
- Advanced Radar Research Center
- History of radar
- List of engineering journals and magazines
- List of radar types
- List of radars
- MIT Radiation Laboratory and MIT Lincoln Laboratory
- Radar engineering
- Synthetic-aperture radar
