= List of aerospace engineering journals =

This is a list of notable aerospace engineering journals. These publications feature peer-reviewed articles related to aerospace systems, flight mechanics, propulsion, aerodynamics, spacecraft design, and related disciplines.

== Journals ==
- Acta Astronautica
- Advances in Space Research
- Aeronautical Engineering Review
- AIAA Journal
- Canadian Aeronautics and Space Journal
- CEAS Space Journal
- CEAS Aeronautical Journal
- Chinese Journal of Aeronautics
- IEEE Transactions on Aerospace and Electronic Systems
- International Journal of Aerospace Engineering
- Journal of Aeronautical and Space Sciences
- Journal of Aerospace Engineering
- Journal of Aircraft
- Journal of Guidance, Control, and Dynamics
- Journal of Propulsion and Power
- Journal of Spacecraft and Rockets
- Journal of the Royal Aeronautical Society
- Proceedings of the Institution of Mechanical Engineers, Part G
- Progress in Aerospace Sciences
- Navigation

== See also ==
- Aeronautics
- Astronautics
- Aviation magazines
- International Conference on Theoretical, Applied, Computational and Experimental Mechanics (ICTACEM)
- International Astronautical Congress
- International Space Development Conference
- Lists of academic journals
- List of engineering journals and magazines
- List of scientific journals
