= Maryellen L. Giger =

Radiology researcher in Chicago, Illinois, USA

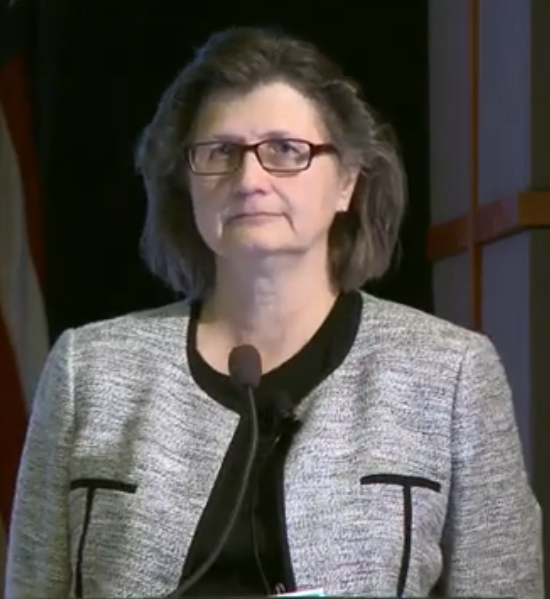
- Giving a talk at The Cancer Genome Atlas 4th Annual Scientific Symposium in 2015
- Born: November 13, 1956 (age 69)
- Education: Illinois Benedictine College; University of Exeter; University of Chicago
- Occupation: Physicist

Maryellen L. Giger, (born November 13, 1956) is an American physicist who has made significant contributions to the field of medical imaging.

Giger co-founded Quantitative Insights, Inc., whose product QuantX is the first FDA-cleared, machine-learning driven system to aid in cancer diagnosis. This makes her the first inventor to successfully develop a system that automatically detects patterns from past cases and outputs a diagnosis on cancer that is equal if not more credible than a doctor's. The technology is currently evolving to detect other medical conditions beside the definitive breast cancer. Her AI research in breast cancer for risk assessment, diagnosis, prognosis and therapeutic response has yielded various translated components, and she has used these “virtual biopsies” in imaging-genomics association studies. She has extended her AI in medical imaging research to include the analysis of COVID-19 on CT and chest radiographs.

She is also the A.N. Pritzker Professor of Radiology and the Committee on Medical Physics at the University of Chicago. She is also the vice-chair of Radiology (Basic Science Research) and the former director of the CAMPEP-accredited Graduate Programs in Medical Physics/chair of the Committee on Medical Physics at the university.

In 2019, QuantX was named one of TIME magazine's inventions of the year.

She is most well known for being an expert in computer-aided diagnosis as well as digital signal processing and digital image processing. Her research incorporates principles of medical physics, engineering, data processing, radiology and radiomics.

Giger was elected a member of the National Academy of Engineering in 2010 for contributions to digital signal analysis for improved cancer detection and treatment and for innovations in interdisciplinary training.

== Education ==
Giger studied at Illinois Benedictine College, graduating summa cum laude with a Bachelor of Science in physics, mathematics, and health science in 1978. Giger went on to pursue her master's degree in physics from the University of Exeter, England in 1979, and her doctoral degree in medical physics from the University of Chicago in 1985. Giger received a certificate in Executive Leadership in Academic Technology and Engineering (ELATE) from Drexel University in 2015.

== Career ==
Giger has conducted research for more than 30 years on computer-aided diagnosis and quantitative image analysis (radiomics/machine learning) in the areas of breast cancer, lung cancer, prostate cancer, and bone diseases. After completing her schooling, she spent three years as research associate, then went on to earn the titles of assistant professor in 1986, associate professor in 1991 and professor in 2000 in the department of Radiology at University of Chicago. She currently holds over 30 patents.

She has served on National Institute of Health (NIH) study sections, is a former president of the American Association of Physicists in Medicine, was the inaugural Editor-in-Chief of the SPIE Journal of Medical Imaging as well as President of the Society in 2018, and is a member of the National Institute of Biomedical Imaging and Bioengineering Advisory Council since 2018. Giger's research in machine-learning, image-based analyses of cancer for risk assessment, diagnosis, prognosis, response to therapy, and biological discovery has yielded various translated components, and she is now studying these image-based phenotypes through deep learning as well as in imaging genomics association studies.

In 2020, Dr. Giger was chosen to lead a new center hosted at the University of Chicago established in response to the ongoing COVID-19 pandemic intended to curate a massive database of medical images to help better understand and treat the disease. The Medical Imaging and Data Resource Center (MIDRC) brings together the largest medical imaging professional organizations in the country details how AI analyses can assist in providing clear data regarding the effectiveness of diagnostic tools, like images, and how these tools can be used as a way of monitoring the progression of illness.

== Awards and honors ==
- Directors' Award from the International Society of Optics and Photonics (SPIE) in 2021
- President of the International Society of Optics and Photonics (SPIE) in 2018 and is a Fellow of the Society
- Fellow of the Institute of Electrical and Electronics Engineers (IEEE) in 2016
- Elected a member of the National Academy of Engineering in 2010
- Fellow of the American Institute for Medical and Biological Engineering (AIMBE)
- Fellow of the American Association of Physicists in Medicine (AAPM)
- Fellow of the Society of Breast MRI (SBMR)
- iCON Innovator Award by the Illinois Biotechnology Industry Organization (iBIO)
- Academic Career Achievement Award from the EMBS in 2016
- William D. Coolidge Gold Medal from the AAPM in 2015
- Named one of the 50 medical physicists with the greatest impact in the field in the last 50 years by the International Organization for Medical Physics (IOMP) in 2013
- President of the American Association of Physicists in Medicine (AAPM) in 2009.
- Sylvia Sorkin Greenfield Award from the AAPM in 1995
