= Céline d'Orgeville =

French optical engineer and astronomer

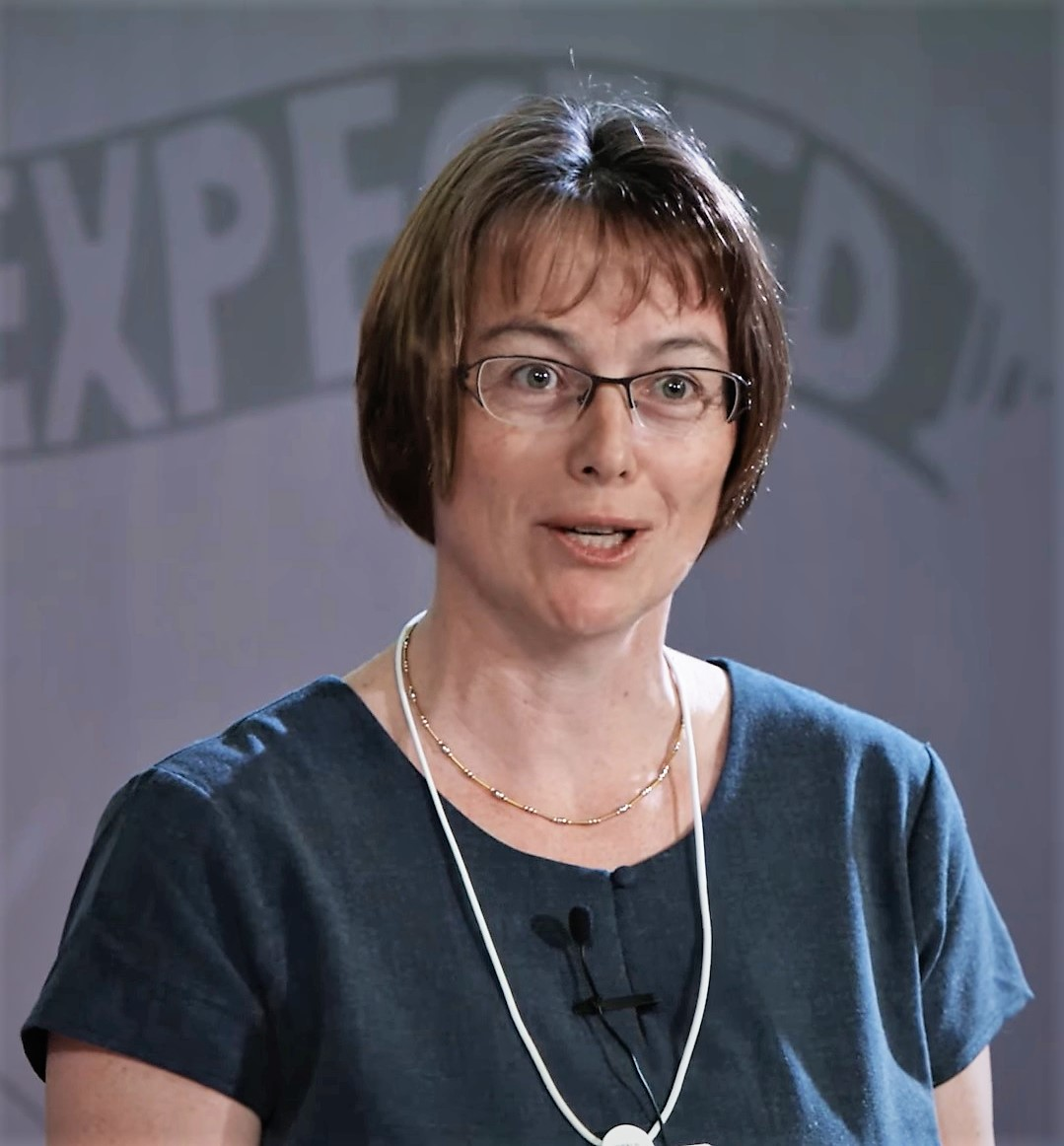
- d'Orgeville speaks at the 2018 World Economic Forum
- Citizenship: France, Australia
- Education: Paris-Sud University; Joseph Fourier University
- Known for: Adaptive optics Optical engineering
- Scientific career
- Workplaces: Australian National University; Gemini Observatory

Céline d'Orgeville is the Program Director of the Australia Telescope National Facility at CSIRO, where she started in February 2025 and leads the operations and research projects in radio astronomy. Prior to that she was a professor at Australian National University and the director of the Advanced Instrumentation Technology Centre, Research School of Astronomy and Astrophysics (2021–2025).

She started her career at the Australian National University as an instrument scientist in 2012, where she was leading teams designing laser and optical systems for ground based astronomical telescopes.

D'orgeville previously worked at the Gemini Observatory from 1999 through 2012, where she led the development of laser guide star systems for both Gemini North and Gemini South. She is a Fellow of SPIE and the Astronomical Society of Australia.

== Early life and education ==
D'Orgeville was an undergraduate and master's student at Paris-Sud University. She spent her summer holidays as an intern in optical engineering. In 1997 d'Orgeville moved to Joseph Fourier University, where she worked on non-linear optics and laser-pumped oscillators.

Céline holds a Master of Science in Optics & Photonics, and a Master of Engineering in Optical Engineering.

== Research and career ==
d'Orgeville studies laser guide star adaptive optics, a technique that uses deformable mirrors and lasers to mitigate for atmospheric blur in images acquired by ground-based telescopes. From 1999 d'Orgeville worked for the Gemini Observatory, which operates the Gemini North and Gemini South astronomical telescopes in Hawaii and Chile respectively. She led the design, fabrication and commissioning of the laser guide star facilities of both telescopes. The laser systems developed by d'Orgeville include the Gemini South Multi-Conjugate Adaptive Optics, a near-infrared adaptive optics camera capable of capturing near diffraction-limited images from outer space.

In 2012 d'Orgeville moved to Australia. She was awarded an Australian National University Translational Fellowship to commercialise sodium guide star lasers. Here she has worked on the laser tomography adaptive optics systems for the Giant Magellan Telescope.

== Academic service ==
Since 2014, d'Orgeville has sat on the management committee of the Australian National University Gender Institute. She worked alongside SPIE on various gender equality initiatives, including collecting demographic data and surveying the adaptive optics community. She was awarded the SPIE Diversity Outreach award in 2021. She is a Fellow of SPIE and the Astronomical Society of Australia.

== Selected publications ==
- Krishna, Sowmya; Martinez, Noelia Martinez; Rigaut, François J.; Roberts, Lyle E.; D'Orgeville, Céline (2022). "Mesospheric sodium layer variations with continuous laser modulation and effects on adaptive optics" Journal of Astronomical Telescopes, Instruments, and Systems, 8(2) doi:10.1117/1.JATIS.8.2.0290
- Travouillon, Tony; D'Orgeville, Céline; Bennet, Francis (2021). "Seeing Clearly" Scientific American 324(4) 38. DOI: 10.1038/scientificamerican0421-38
- Rigaut, François; Benoit Neichel; Maxime Boccas; et al. (2014). "Gemini multiconjugate adaptive optics system review - I. Design, trade-offs and integration". Monthly Notices of the Royal Astronomical Society. 437: 2361–2375. arXiv:1310.6199. Bibcode:2014MNRAS.437.2361R. doi:10.1093/mnras/stt2054. Wikidata Q69078906.
- Benoit Neichel; Rigaut, François; Fabrice Vidal; et al. (2014). "Gemini multiconjugate adaptive optics system review – II. Commissioning, operation and overall performance". Monthly Notices of the Royal Astronomical Society. 440 (2): 1002–1019. arXiv:1402.6906. Bibcode:2014MNRAS.440.1002N. doi:10.1093/mnras/stu403. Wikidata Q56892746.
- Thomas P Rutten; Peter J Veitch; Céline d'Orgeville; Jesper Munch (2007). "Injection mode-locked guide star laser concept and design verification experiments". Optics Express. 15 (5): 2369–2374. doi:10.1364/oe.15.002369. PMID 19532473. Wikidata Q33469182.
