= Muszyński =

Muszyński (feminine Muszyńska) is a Polish surname. Notable people with the surname include:

- Agnes Muszyńska (1935–2024), Polish-American mechanical engineer
- Kacper Muszyński (born 1997), Polish kickboxer
- Henryk Muszyński (born 1933), Polish Roman Catholic archbishop
- Marek Muszyński (born 1947), Polish politician
- Nick Muszynski (born 1998), American basketball player
- Robert Muczynski (1929–2010), American composer
- Wojciech Muszyński (born 1972), Polish historian and researcher
