= Amit Bandyopadhyay (scientist) =

Indian-American material scientists

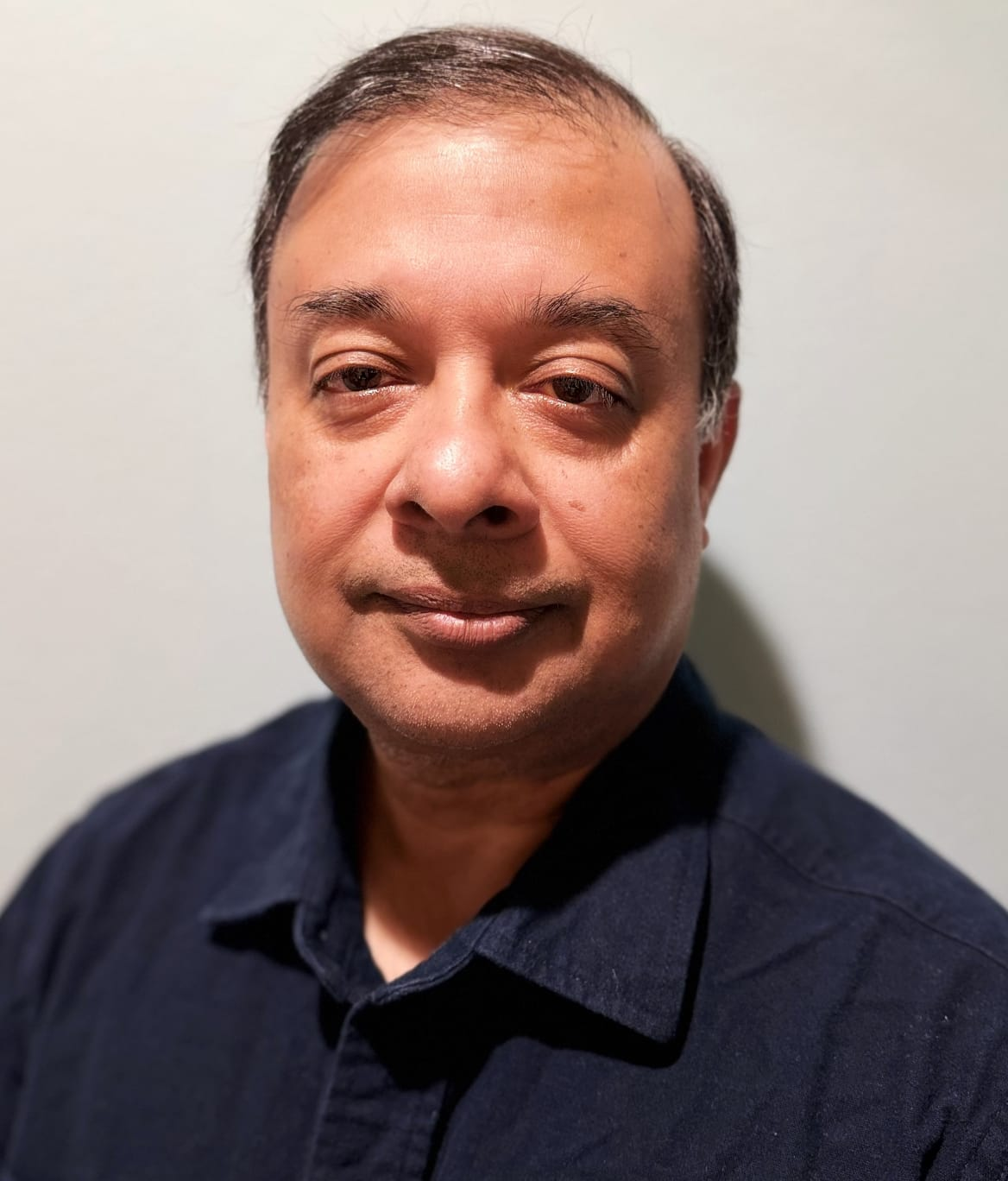
- Born: 1967 (age 58–59); Kolkata, India
- Education: Jadavpur University; Indian Institute of Science; University of Texas at Arlington
- Known for: Among the earliest researchers to apply 3D printing to metals and advanced materials.
- Awards: Fellow of the Materials Research Society
- Scientific career
- Fields: Material science biomedical engineering additive manufacturing
- Workplaces: Washington State University

Amit Bandyopadhyay (born 1967) is an Indian-born American materials scientist and engineer. He is the Boeing Distinguished Chair Professor in the School of Mechanical and Materials Engineering at Washington State University. His research focuses on additive manufacturing (3D printing) of metals, ceramics, and composites, particularly for biomedical and structural applications.

== Early life and education ==
Bandyopadhyay was born in Kolkata, India, and grew up in Uttarpara, West Bengal, India. He earned a Bachelor’s degree in Metallurgical Engineering from Jadavpur University in 1989 and a Master’s degree in Metallurgy from the Indian Institute of Science, Bangalore, in 1992. He completed his PhD in Materials Science and Engineering at the University of Texas at Arlington in 1995. Following his doctorate, he undertook postdoctoral research at the Center for Ceramics Research, Rutgers University from 1995 to 1997.

== Academic career ==
Bandyopadhyay joined Washington State University in 1997 as an Assistant Professor in the School of Mechanical and Materials Engineering. He was promoted to Associate Professor in 2001 and to Full Professor in 2006. In 2022, he was appointed Boeing Distinguished Chair Professor at WSU.

He has held affiliate or visiting positions at Harvard University, Georgia Institute of Technology, and the Washington State University College of Medicine. He served as Director of the Bioengineering Research Center at WSU from 2004 to 2010.

He is an elected Fellow of the Materials Research Society (MRS), American Ceramic Society (ACerS), American Society for Materials (ASM International), Society of Manufacturing Engineers (SME), American Institute for Medical and Biological Engineering (AIMBE), and the American Association for the Advancement of Science (AAAS). He is also a member of the National Academy of Inventors (NAI) and the Washington State Academy of Sciences (WSAS). Among others, he has also received the Distinguished Faculty Address Award and the Sahlin Faculty Excellence Award for Research, Scholarship and Arts from Washington State University.

== Research ==
Bandyopadhyay has authored over 400 peer-reviewed publications and holds more than 20 issued patents. His work has received tens of thousands of citations, reflecting sustained impact across materials science, manufacturing, and biomedical engineering.

He has also co-edited several books and textbooks, including Additive Manufacturing, Characterization of Biomaterials, and Materials and Devices for Bone Disorders, which are used internationally.

Bandyopadhyay has served in senior editorial roles for several journals, including Editor-in-Chief of the International Journal of Applied Ceramic Technology and Executive Editor-in-Chief of the International Journal of Extreme Manufacturing.

Bandyopadhyay’s research lies at the intersection of materials science, advanced manufacturing, and biomedical engineering. He has worked in the field of additive manufacturing since the mid-1990s and was among the earliest researchers to apply 3D printing to metals and advanced materials. He acquired WSU’s first 3D printer in 1997 and later, with support from the W. M. Keck Foundation, pioneered metal 3D printing research at the university.

A major contribution of his work is the development of 3D-printed porous metallic structures for load-bearing biomedical implants, designed to improve bone ingrowth, mechanical compatibility, and long-term implant performance. This concept has since been adopted widely in orthopedic, dental, and craniofacial implants.

His research has also addressed functionally graded materials, multi-material structures, surface modification, and alloy design, including the development of titanium alloys with inherent antibacterial properties for orthopedic applications.

Bandyopadhyay has published influential review and research articles on the fabrication and application of porous and functionally graded metallic implants, analyzing how manufacturing methods influence microstructure, porosity, mechanical behavior, and biocompatibility. His work emphasizes processing–property–performance relationships critical for reliable and reproducible implant manufacturing.

Beyond biomedical applications, Bandyopadhyay has contributed to multi-metal additive manufacturing methods that allow different metals to be deposited within the same layer, enabling novel mechanical and functional properties. He has also collaborated with NASA on research involving 3D printing using lunar regolith simulants, exploring materials and structures for space and aerospace applications.

At the School of Mechanical and Materials Engineering at Washington State University, Bandyopadhyay and Susmita Bose, his wife and lifelong collaborator, developed a nontoxic method for controlling difficult-to-treat bacterial infections associated with orthopedic implants. Their research demonstrated that nanoscale amounts of silver or copper addition could be affixed to stainless steel bone implant materials to provide long-term antibacterial activity.

== Personal life ==
He is married to Susmita Bose, and they have two boys, Shohom and Aditya.
