= Melody Swartz =

American academic

Melody A. Swartz
- Born: April 1969 (age 57)
- Education: Johns Hopkins University, BS 1991; Massachusetts Institute of Technology, PhD 1998; Harvard Medical School, postdoc. 1999.
- Scientific career
- Fields: Bioengineering
- Workplaces: Northwestern University; École Polytechnique Fédérale de Lausanne; University of Chicago;
- Thesis: (1998)

Melody A. Swartz (born April 1969) is a professor and vice dean for faculty affairs at the University of Chicago who pioneered research in engineering complex tissues. Her most cited work "Capturing complex 3D tissue physiology in vitro" has been cited over 1784 times. Her research is focused on understanding the role of the lymphatic system regulating immunity in homeostasis and diseases, particularly cancer. She was previously director of the Institute of Bioengineering at the École Polytechnique Fédérale de Lausanne. She was elected to the National Academy of Engineering in 2023, the Royal Academy of Medicine of Belgium in 2023, and the National Academy of Medicine in 2020.

== Education ==
Swartz was born in Illinois. She earned her undergraduate degree in chemical engineering at Johns Hopkins University (1991) and her PhD in chemical engineering at Massachusetts Institute of Technology (1998). She did her postdoctoral work in the pulmonary division at Harvard Medical School.

== Career ==
Swartz began her career working at Northwestern University in Evanston, Illinois, from 1999 to 2004 as an assistant professor in the chemical, biomedical and bioengineering departments. She served various roles in the École Polytechnique Fédérale de Lausanne from 2003 to 2016. first as an assistant professor in the institute of bioengineering, then becoming an associate professor in 2007, finally getting a professorship in 2010 and becoming the institute's director in 2012 until 2014.

In 2014 Swartz took over a part time role in the École Polytechnique Fédérale de Lausanne as she began to transition to working in the University of Chicago's Ben May department of Cancer Research and the Pritzker School of Molecular Engineering, of which she jointly became a professor of both. Swartz is a member of multiple committees at the University of Chicago including the committee on immunology. and the committee on cancer biology.

Swartz is a member of many college boards and advisory councils. She is a part of MIT's Koch Institute's scientific advisory board and has previously served as a strategic scientific advisory board member for the Basel Research Center for Child Health.

== Academia ==
Swartz main focus of research throughout her career has been topics relating to cancer, lymphatic immunology and immunotherapy.

Swartz' most cited article "Capturing complex 3D tissue physiology in vitro" was published in March 2006. She talks about creating 3D tissue models in the vitro software. Discussing some design principles for recreating the interwoven set of both biochemical and mechanical cousin the cellular microenvironment and implementing these principles. Emphasizing the involvement of epithelial tissues in 3D models. She mentions two crucial foundations that were crucial for the future of the field. First foundation was the spatial arrangement of cell-surface receptors and the temporal sequence they are presented. The other was a toolbox of biomaterials that should be used for the formation and maintenance of 3D tissues in vitro. This article has been cited 2806 times most recently in 2024 in the article "The potential of graphene coatings as neural interfaces".

=== Editorial positions ===
Swartz is on many journals' editorial boards. She has served on the editorial board of Angiogenesis, a journal covering topics on cellular and molecular mechanisms (2011–present). Swartz is also on the editorial boards of Cancer Immunology Research (2013–present) and Biomechanics and Modeling in Mechanobiology (2015–present).

== Honors ==
- Swartz has received various honors and awards throughout her career.
- On February 7, 2023, Swartz was elected 1 of 106 new members of the National Academy of Engineering for her work on cancer immunotherapy and vaccination. On that day Swartz was also announced as one of eight international members of the Royal Academy of Medicine of Belgium for her work in lymphatic vascular biology, immunology and immunotherapy.
- On October 19, 2020 Swartz was announced as a new member of the National Academy of Medicine.
- In 2018 Swartz was elected to the American Academy of Arts and Sciences.
- In 2012 Swartz was made a fellow of the MacArthur Foundation.
