= Hazel Screen =

British engineer

Hazel Rosemary Corinna Screen
- Education: Queen Mary University of London; University College London
- Scientific career
- Workplaces: Queen Mary University of London
- Thesis: The contribution of structural components to tendon mechanics (2003)

Hazel Screen is a British engineer, Head of the School of Engineering & Materials Science and a professor of Biomedical Engineering at Queen Mary University of London. Her research looks to understand the complex structure of biological tissues, with a particular focus on tissues and heart valves. She is a Fellow of the Institution of Mechanical Engineers.

== Early life and education ==
Screen was a student at University College London, where she completed her undergraduate and postgraduate degrees. She studied advanced instrumentation for a Master's research. She started her doctorate at Queen Mary University of London in 1999, and studied structure-function relationships in tendons. Screen remained at QMUL as a postdoctoral researcher.

== Research and career ==
In 2004 Screen was made a lecturer in Biomedical Engineering, where she was made Professor in 2015. Screen studies the mechanisms that underpin the structural integrity of soft biological tissue. She is particularly interested in tissues of the heart valve and tendon. At Queen Mary Screen leads the Tendon Research group. Tendons are fibrous tissues that connect muscles to bone, and their self-repair mechanisms become less efficient with ageing. Screen studies the interfascicular matrix of tendons and how it is impacted by ageing. She developed organ-on-a-chip technologies to recreate physiological processes, and test new treatments for tendon disease.

She serves as Director of the UK Organ-on-a-Chip Technologies Network and is Director of Queen Mary Centre for Predictive in vitro Models.

== Awards and honours ==
- Fellow of the Institution of Mechanical Engineers

== Select publications ==
- H R C Screen; D A Lee; Daniel L. V. Bader; Julia C Shelton (1 January 2004). "An investigation into the effects of the hierarchical structure of tendon fascicles on micromechanical properties". Proceedings of the Institution of Mechanical Engineers. 218 (2): 109–119. doi:10.1243/095441104322984004. ISSN 0954-4119. PMID 15116898. S2CID 46256718. Wikidata Q47675874.
- Sethu Mani-Babu; Dylan Morrissey; Charlie Waugh; Hazel Screen; Christian J. Barton (9 May 2014). "The effectiveness of extracorporeal shock wave therapy in lower limb tendinopathy: a systematic review". The American Journal of Sports Medicine. 43 (3): 752–761. doi:10.1177/0363546514531911. ISSN 0363-5465. PMID 24817008. Wikidata Q34661829.
- Hazel R. C. Screen; David E. Berk; Karl E. Kadler; Francesco Ramirez; Marian F. Young (1 June 2015). "Tendon functional extracellular matrix". Journal of Orthopaedic Research. 33 (6): 793–799. doi:10.1002/jor.22818. ISSN 0736-0266. PMC 4507431. PMID 25640030. Wikidata Q35866265.
