= Advanced Photonics =

- Discipline: Photonics, optics
- Language: English
- Edited by: Xiao-Cong Yuan, Anatoly Zayats

Publication details
- History: 2019–present
- Publisher: SPIE, Chinese Laser Press
- Frequency: Bimonthly
- Open access: Yes
- License: CC BY 4.0
- Impact factor: 19.5 (2025)

Standard abbreviations
- ISO 4: Adv. Photonics

Indexing
- CODEN: APDHC9
- ISSN: 2577-5421
- LCCN: 2018201563
- OCLC no.: 1030440828

Links
- Journal homepage; Online access; Online archive

Advanced Photonics is a peer-reviewed open access scientific journal published bimonthly by SPIE and Chinese Laser Press. It covers fundamental and applied research in optics and photonics. It was established in 2019 and the editors-in-chief are Xiao-Cong Yuan (Shenzhen University) and Anatoly Zayats (King's College London).

== Abstracting and indexing ==
The journal is abstracted and indexed in:

- Current Contents/Physical, Chemical & Earth Sciences
- Directory of Open Access Journals
- Ei Compendex
- Inspec
- ProQuest databases
- Science Citation Index Expanded
- Scopus

According to the Journal Citation Reports, the journal has a 2025 impact factor of 19.5.
