= Institute for Palestine Studies =

Independent research institution

- مؤسسة الدراسات الفلسطينية
- Abbreviation: IPS
- Formation: 1963; 63 years ago
- Type: Research institute
- Headquarters: Anis Nsouli Street, Verdun
- Location: Beirut, Lebanon
- Website: palestine-studies.org

The Institute for Palestine Studies (Arabic: مؤسسة الدراسات الفلسطينية, romanized: Muʾassasat ad-Dirāsāt al-Filasṭīniyya; IPS) is the oldest independent nonprofit public service research institute in the Arab world. It was established and incorporated in Beirut, Lebanon, in 1963, and has since served as a model for other such institutes in the region. It is the only institute solely concerned with analyzing and documenting Palestinian affairs and the Arab–Israeli conflict. It also publishes scholarly journals and has published more than 600 books, monographs, and documentary collections in English, Arabic and French—as well as its quarterly academic journals: Journal of Palestine Studies, Jerusalem Quarterly, and Majallat al-Dirasat al-Filastiniyya. IPS's Library in Beirut is the largest in the Arab world specializing in Palestinian affairs, the Arab–Israeli conflict, and Judaica.

It is led by a board of trustees comprising some forty scholars, businessmen, and public figures representing almost all Arab countries. The institute currently maintains offices in Beirut, Paris, Washington, and Ramallah.

== Organization ==
The institute is independent of government, party, or political organization. IPS activities are financed by income from its endowment, contributions and gifts from donors, and sales of its publications.

== History ==
The institute was founded in Beirut in 1963 by three Arab intellectuals: Constantine Zurayk (Syria), Walid Khalidi (Palestine) and Burhan Dajani (Palestine). The Institute's website states that it was founded "independent non-profit research institution, unaffiliated with any political organization or government", and to "disseminate an accurate account" of the Israeli-Palestinian conflict and to "provide a powerful case for Palestinian historical rights." This vision was supported by eight intellectuals and prominent figures including Nabih Amin Faris, Maurice Gemmayel, Wadad Cortas, Fuad Sarrouf, Sa'id Himadeh, Edmond Rabbath, Charles Helou, Najla Abou Izzeddin.

In 2006, the Institute for Palestine Studies launched the Congressional Monitor project, which tracks every legislative initiative introduced in the U.S. Congress that mentions Palestine or Israel or has bearing on the Palestinian–Israeli conflict. The project is online and users can access the legislation as well as the congressional record from which it is drawn through the Congressional Monitor Database. Tips on using the database as well as a quick guide to the U.S. legislative process are provided.

== Library ==
The institute's library is located at the institute's headquarters in Beirut. It is the largest in the Arab world specializing in Palestinian affairs, the Arab–Israeli conflict, and Judaica, with more than 40,000 volumes, 400 current periodicals, 5,000 reels of film plus newspapers, maps, documents, and a large collection of private papers. It is also interested in studying and promoting knowledge of Hebrew.

== Publications ==
The institute publishes three quarterly journals in English and Arabic. These are independently edited and published from Washington, Paris, Jerusalem, and Beirut respectively. The journals are:

- The Journal of Palestine Studies (JPS), which was established in 1971. Edited in Washington D.C., it is published and distributed by the University of California Press on behalf of the institute. The current editor is Sherene Seikaly of the University of California, Santa Barbara.
- The Revue d'études palestiniennes, a French quarterly published between 1981 and 2008. Edited and produced in Paris, and printed and distributed by Éditions de Minuit, it served as the principal French-language periodical of reference on the Israeli–Palestinian conflict. Publication ceased in 2008, largely as a result of financial constraints. According to the Institute for Palestine Studies, the global financial crisis of 2007 compelled the suspension of the journal despite its acknowledged importance among Francophone audiences. Samir Kassir served on its editorial board from 1986 to 1994.
- The Arabic-language quarterly, Majallat al-Dirasat al-Filastiniyya (MDF; مجلة الدراسات الفلسطينية, Majallat ad-Dirāsāt al-Filasṭīniyya), was founded in 1990. It is edited in London and Beirut and is simultaneously reprinted in Ramallah in the West Bank for distribution in the Palestinian Territories. Nahed Jaafar, Anis Muhsin and Khaled Farraj serve as its editors.
- The Jerusalem Quarterly (JQ) was conceived in 1998 as the Jerusalem Quarterly File. Edited in Jerusalem, it is published by the Institute of Jerusalem Studies (IJS), an affiliate of the Institute for Palestine Studies; the Arabic edition, Hawliyat al-Quds (حوليات القدس, Ḥawliyyāt al-Quds), ran from 2003 to 2014. Jerusalem Quarterly publishes historical features and contemporary analysis of aspects of city life and reviews. The journal is available quarterly online, and in print copy through paid subscription.

It has also published more than 600 books. It has published many first-person Palestinian accounts of the 1948 Arab–Israeli War.

== Board of trustees ==
The institute is led by a Board of Trustees composed of Arab scholars, businessmen, and public figures. A volunteer executive committee, elected by the Board, manage the regular activities. The trustees come from most Arab countries, including Algeria, Bahrain, Egypt, Jordan, Kuwait, Lebanon, Qatar, Saudi Arabia, United Arab Emirates and Yemen.

== See also ==
- Education in Palestine
- List of universities and colleges in Palestine
