= Shen Qiang (engineer) =

Academic and engineer

Qiang Shen
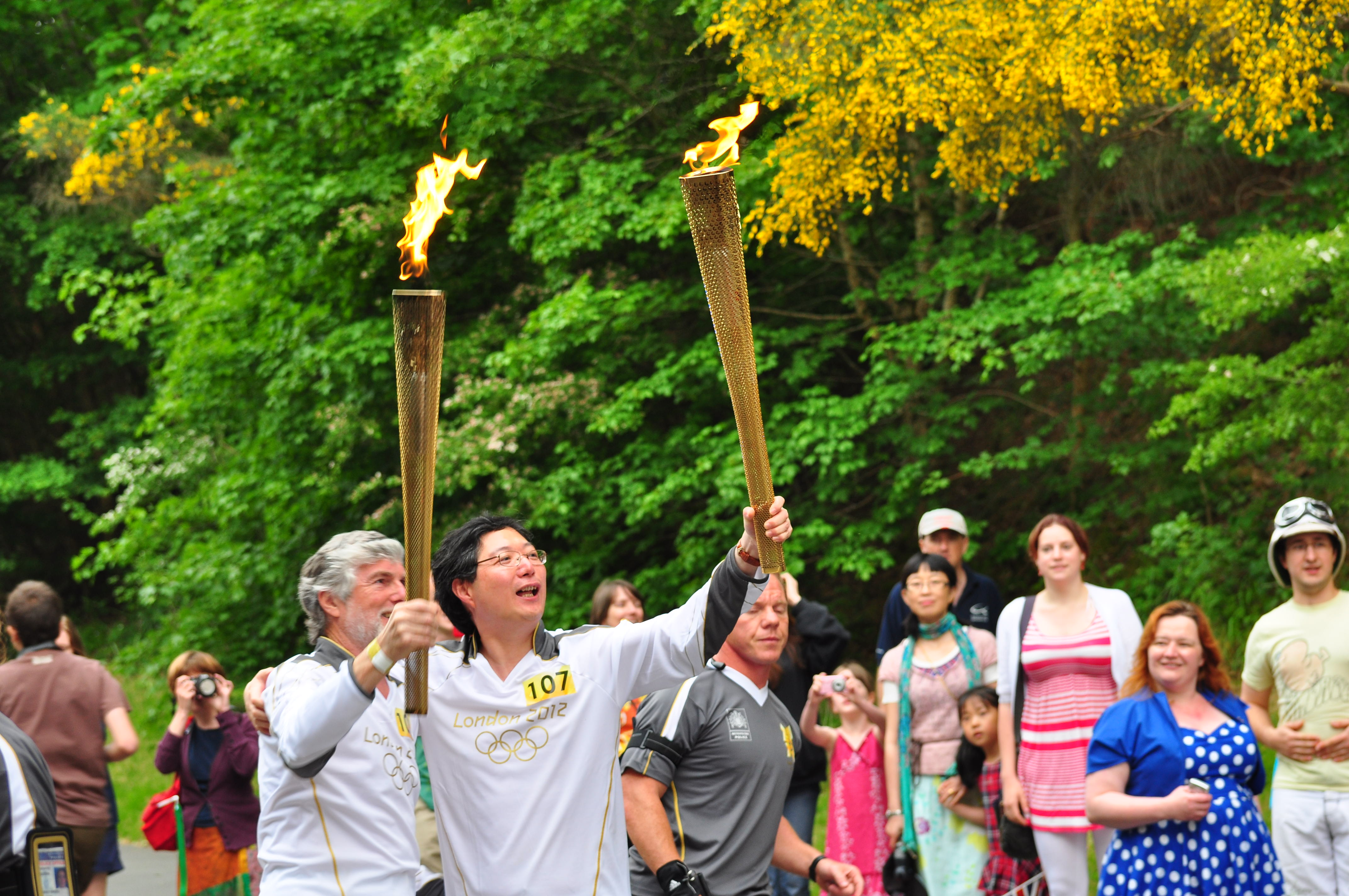
- Shen (right) in 2012 as part of olympic torch relay
- Engineering career
- Discipline: Electrical Engineering; Computing
- Employer: Aberystwyth University

Professor Qiang Shen is an academic and engineer. He is an expert in the research and development of data modelling and analysis and currently serves as Pro Vice-Chancellor at Aberystwyth University. As of 2023, he has published 450 peer-reviewed papers in electronic engineering and computing journals. His expertise is often applied to critical intelligent decision support systems, with a focus on an increased level of automation, efficiency and reliability.

== Career & research ==
In 2004, Shen published a paper with the Institute of Electrical and Electronics Engineers where he and co-authors studied methodologies and approaches of Semantics-preserving dimensionality reduction techniques. In 2009, he was the recipient of the Computational Intelligence Society Outstanding Paper Award from the Institute of Electrical and Electronics Engineers for his work on Fuzzy systems. In 2012, as part of the London 2012 Olympics celebration, the olympic torch passed through the Welsh town of Aberystwyth. Shen was selected by Aberystwyth University to be one of the two torchbearers of the olympic torch as it passed through the town. During the same year, Shen was elected as a council member of the Learned Society of Wales.

In 2017, Shen published research in the journal Remote Sensing which showed that using spectral–spatial information can considerably improve the performance of hyperspectral image (HSI) classification. Shen was part of informal hearings and meetings for the analysis of data in 2018 for Review of Government Funded Research and Innovation in Wales carried out by the Welsh Government. In 2021, he was part of the sub-panel for Computer Science and Informatics on the 2021 Research Excellence Framework. He became a Royal Academy of Engineering fellow in 2022.

The real life application of Shen's work include fields such as space exploration, counterterrorism, process monitoring, transportation management and consumer profiling. Qiang currently serves as Pro Vice-Chancellor the for Faculty of Business and Physical Sciences at Aberystwyth University.
