= Roman Kachanov =

Roman Kachanov may refer to:

- Roman Kachanov (animator) (1921–1993), a Russian animator (director, screenwriter, art director, animator)
- Roman Romanovich Kachanov (born 1967), his son, Russian film director, screenwriter and actor

== See also ==
- Kachanov
