= Journal of Optical Microsystems =

- Discipline: Microphotonics, optical systems
- Language: English
- Edited by: Hans Zappe

Publication details
- History: 2021–present
- Publisher: SPIE
- Frequency: Quarterly
- Open access: Yes
- License: CC BY 4.0
- Impact factor: 1.6 (2022)

Standard abbreviations
- ISO 4: J. Opt. Microsyst.

Indexing
- CODEN: JOMOEX
- ISSN: 2708-5260
- OCLC no.: 1250096319

Links
- Journal homepage; Online access; Online archive

Journal of Optical Microsystems is a peer-reviewed open access scientific journal published quarterly by SPIE. It covers fundamental and applied research in microphotonics and optical systems. It was established in 2021 and the editor-in-chief is Hans Zappe (University of Freiburg).

== Abstracting and indexing ==
The journal is abstracted and indexed in:

- Current Contents/Physical, Chemical & Earth Sciences
- Ei Compendex
- Inspec
- Science Citation Index Expanded
- Scopus

According to the Journal Citation Reports, the journal has a 2022 impact factor of 1.6.
