= Institute of Navigation =

United States non-profit professional society

The Institute of Navigation (ION) is a United States non-profit professional society advancing the art and science of positioning, navigation and timing. It was founded in 1945 by Samuel Herrick and P. V. H. Weems. It serves communities interested in navigation and positioning on land, air, sea and space. It is a worldwide organization with members in more than 50 countries.

As of 2022, the ION has approximately 2,500 members. The ION is headquartered in Manassas, Virginia.

== History ==
During World War II, the field of navigation experienced "dramatic developments [during] a period of fast-moving changes... People recognized the need for an organization to provide a forum for discussion [of the] various aspects of navigation." Dr. Samuel Herrick, assistant professor of astronomy at UCLA, proposed an institute for navigation. Dr. Herrick envisioned a research center and publication of a journal.

On June 25, 1945, the Institute of Navigation was founded at an organizational meeting held at UCLA. The institute's first permanent council was elected at the first annual meeting in October 1945. Colin H. McIntosh, of American Airlines, was elected as the institute's first president. The institute's journal, NAVIGATION, was first published in March 1946. In 1961, aviator Dot Lemon became the ION's first woman president.

The ION National Office was located on the campus of UCLA until 1960, when it moved to Washington, D.C. In 1992, the headquarters were relocated to Northern Virginia.

== NAVIGATION: Journal of the Institute of Navigation ==
The Institute of Navigation publishes a quarterly journal, NAVIGATION: Journal of the Institute of Navigation with original, peer-reviewed papers in an open access (OA) environment on all areas related to the art, science, and engineering of positioning, navigation and timing (PNT) covering land (including indoor use), sea, air, and space applications.

== Conferences ==
The Institute sponsors several technical conferences each year. These conferences focus on current developments in positioning, navigation and timing, and policy.

- ION International Technical Meeting (ITM) and Precise Time and Time Interval Systems and Applications) PTTI Conference, January.
- IEEE/ION PLANS (Position, Location and Navigation Symposium) Conference, Spring, biennial.
- ION Pacific PNT (Positioning, Navigation and Timing) Conference, Spring, Biennial.
- ION Joint Navigation Conference, Summer, annual (hosted by the ION Military Division)
- ION GNSS+, September. ION GNSS+ is attended by approximately 1,000 GPS and GNSS specialists from more than 40 countries.(hosted by the ION Satellite Division)

== Programs ==
The Institute of Navigation hosts regular live webinars on topics of interest to the PNT community.

The ION sponsors a variety of programs intended to promote the art and science of positioning, navigation and timing. In an effort to reach out to the next generation of engineers, ION sponsor student grants and a scholarship program, student paper competitions and STEM Lesson Plans.

The ION also sponsors government fellows that serve a one-year term in a Congressional office or an Executive Branch department.

== Awards ==
The ION recognizes individuals who have made significant contributions to the art and science of navigation. These recognitions include annual awards and election to Fellow membership.
