= Jennifer Barton =

American biomedical engineer

Jennifer Kehlet Barton
- Education: University of Texas at Austin (BS, PhD); University of California, Irvine
- Scientific career
- Workplaces: University of Arizona
- Thesis: Predicting dosimetry for laser coagulation of in vivo cutaneous blood vessels (1998)

Jennifer Kehlet Barton is an American biomedical engineer who is Director of the BIO5 Institute at the University of Arizona. Barton develops optical techniques for the detection and treatment of cancer.

== Early life and education ==
Barton earned her bachelor's degree in electrical engineering at the University of Texas at Austin. She moved to the University of California, Irvine for her graduate studies. She then joined McDonnell Douglas, an aerospace engineering organization now known as Boeing. She eventually returned to academia, moving to the University of Texas at Austin to research biomedical engineering for a doctoral degree.

== Research and career ==
In 1998, Jennifer Barton joined the faculty of the University of Arizona. Here Borton teaches multiple different engineering and science classes including optical sciences and electrical and computer engineering. She has investigated a variety of imaging techniques for diagnosing and treating cancer, including optical coherence tomography and fluorescence spectroscopy. Barton developed miniature, integrated endoscopes that combine both imaging modalities, with a particular focus on identifying the biomarkers that underpin ovarian cancer. At the time, screening for ovarian cancer included pelvic ultrasounds and blood tests for CA-125, but neither of these techniques improve the outcomes for people with ovarian cancer. Jennifer has more than 90 peer-reviewed research journal papers.

From 2009 to 2012 Barton was an assistant director for BIO5 and in 2015, Barton was named interim director of the University of Arizona BIO5 Institute. BIO5 is a space for exploration and innovation. The institute welcomes scientists from a variety of disciplines, including agriculture and pharmacy.

In 2021, Barton joined the presidential chain of SPIE, a professional society for optical engineers. She served as president-elect in 2023, and assumed the role of president in 2024.

== Awards and honors ==
- 1997: SPIE D. J. Lovell Scholarship
- 2008: Elected Fellow of SPIE
- 2009: Elected Fellow of the American Institute for Medical and Biological Engineering
- 2011: Elected Da Vinci Fellow of the University of Arizona
- 2012: AZBio Michael A. Cusanovich Biosciences Educator of the Year Award
- 2016: SPIE President's Award

== Selected publications ==
- Christopher Loo; Alex Lin; Leon Hirsch; Min-Ho Lee; Jennifer Barton; Naomi Halas; Jennifer West; Rebekah Drezek (2004). "Nanoshell-enabled photonics-based imaging and therapy of cancer". Technology in Cancer Research and Treatment. 3 (1): 33–40. doi:10.1177/153303460400300104. PMID 14750891. Wikidata Q34293561.
- Izatt JA; Kulkarni MD; Yazdanfar S; Barton JK; Welch AJ (1997). "In vivo bidirectional color Doppler flow imaging of picoliter blood volumes using optical coherence tomography". Optics Letters. 22 (18): 1439–1441. doi:10.1364/ol.22.001439. PMID 18188263. Wikidata Q51792073.
- Kristi A Hansen; Jeffrey A Weiss; Jennifer K Barton (2002). "Recruitment of tendon crimp with applied tensile strain". Journal of Biomechanical Engineering. 124 (1): 72–77. doi:10.1115/1.1427698. PMID 11871607. Wikidata Q77710406.
