= List of architecture journals =

List of academic and professional journals in architecture

This is a list of architecture journals which includes academic, peer-reviewed, and professional publications dedicated to the field of architecture, including architectural theory, design, history, criticism, and practice.

== Journals ==
- Architects' Journal
- Architectural Design
- Architectural Theory Review
- ARQ (Architecture Research Quarterly)
- Avery Review
- Buildings (journal)
- Journal of Architecture
- Journal of Architectural Education
- Journal of the Society of Architectural Historians
- OASE (journal)
- Perspecta (journal)
- HORIZONTE (journal)
- TRANS magazine

== See also ==
- Architecture
- Architectural theory
- History of architecture
- List of architecture magazines
- List of academic journals
