= Kachanov =

Kachanov may refer to:

- Mark Kachanov, American mechanical engineer
- Roman Abelevich Kachanov (1921–1993), a Russian animator (director, screenwriter, art director, animator)
- Roman Kachanov (film director) (born 1967), son of Roman A. Kachanov, Russian film director, screenwriter and actor
