= Journal of Palestine Studies =

- Discipline: Middle Eastern studies; Israeli–Palestinian conflict
- Language: English
- Edited by: Sherene Seikaly

Publication details
- History: 1971–present
- Publisher: Taylor and Francis on behalf of the Institute for Palestine Studies
- Frequency: Quarterly
- Impact factor: 0.8 (2022)

Standard abbreviations
- ISO 4: J. Palest. Stud.; JPS

Indexing
- ISSN: 0377-919X (print); 1533-8614 (web)
- LCCN: 72960892
- JSTOR: 0377919X
- OCLC no.: 757505811

Links
- Journal homepage; Online access; Online archive; Journal page at Institute for Palestine Studies

The Journal of Palestine Studies (JPS) is a quarterly peer-reviewed academic journal which has been published since 1971. It is published by Taylor and Francis on behalf of the Institute for Palestine Studies.

== History ==
=== Establishment ===
The journal was established in 1971. Burhan Dajani, Walid Khalidi, Fuad Sarruf and Constantin Zureiq were instrumental in its start. The founding editor-in-chief was Hisham Sharabi, who wrote the editor's note for the very first edition published in Autumn 1971.

=== First edition ===
The first volume was published in Autumn 1971. Its contents included seven sections: interview, articles, research study, recent books, periodicals in review, notes on the quarter, and documents and source material.

The interview with Mohamed Hassanein Heikal discussed war and peace in the middle east. There were four articles – Israel's Nuclear Options, by Fuad A. Jabber; The Middle East Conflict in US Strategy, 1970-71, by William B. Quandt; Recent Knesset Legislation and the Arabs in Israel, by Sabri Jiryis; and The Fall of Jerusalem, 1967, by S. Abdullah Schleife. The research study featured was Social Factors Influencing Attitudes of University Students in Lebanon Towards the Palestinian Resistance Movement authored by Halim Barakat. Six books were reviewed ranging in topic and language.

=== Special issues ===
Various special issues have been published since the 2010s. These include Operation Protective Edge (2014), Palestinian Economic Development (2016), 100 Years Since the Balfour Declaration (2017), Queering Palestine (2018), 1948 and its Shadows (2018), Black-Palestinian Transnational Solidarity (2019), The Pandemic and Palestine (2020), and Palestinians in the United States and Canada (2021).

== Profile ==
JPS is published by Taylor and Francis on behalf of the Beirut-based Institute for Palestine Studies, having previously been published by the University of California Press. The editor-in-chief since 2020 is Sherene Seikaly (UC Santa Barbara), formerly alongside Rashid Khalidi (Columbia University).

The journal covers Palestinian affairs and the Arab–Israeli conflict.

== Abstracting and indexing ==
JPS is abstracted and indexed in Scopus and the Social Sciences Citation Index. According to the Journal Citation Reports, the journal has a 2022 impact factor of 0.8.

== See also ==
- Arab Studies Quarterly
- List of University of California Press journals
