= Proceedings of the Institution of Mechanical Engineers, Part J =

Proceedings of the Institution of Mechanical Engineers, Part J: Journal of Engineering Tribology
- Discipline: Mechanical engineering
- Language: English
- Edited by: Rob S Dwyer-Joyce

Publication details
- History: 1994-present
- Publisher: SAGE Publications (United Kingdom)
- Frequency: Monthly
- Impact factor: 0.660 (2013)

Standard abbreviations
- ISO 4: Proc. Inst. Mech. Eng. J

Indexing
- CODEN: PEJTET
- ISSN: 1350-6501 (print); 2041-305X (web)
- LCCN: 94658566
- OCLC no.: 60648825

Links
- Journal homepage; Online access; Online archive

The Journal of Engineering Tribology, Part J of the Proceedings of the Institution of Mechanical Engineers (IMechE), is a peer-reviewed academic journal that publishes research on engineering science associated with tribology and its applications. The journal was first published in 1994 and is published by SAGE Publications on behalf of IMechE.

== Abstracting and indexing ==
The Journal of Engineering Tribology is abstracted and indexed in Scopus and the Science Citation Index. According to the Journal Citation Reports, its 2013 impact factor is 0.631, ranking it 81st out of 126 journals in the category "Engineering, Mechanical".
