= Proceedings of the Institution of Mechanical Engineers, Part F =

Proceedings of the Institution of Mechanical Engineers, Part F: Journal of Rail and Rapid Transit
- Discipline: Transportation engineering
- Language: English
- Edited by: Simon S D Iwnicki

Publication details
- History: 1989-present
- Publisher: SAGE Publications
- Frequency: 8/year
- Impact factor: 0.743 (2013)

Standard abbreviations
- ISO 4: Proc. Inst. Mech. Eng. F

Indexing
- ISSN: 0954-4097 (print); 2041-3017 (web)
- LCCN: 89643806
- OCLC no.: 19786779

Links
- Journal homepage; Online access; Online archive

The Proceedings of the Institution of Mechanical Engineers, Part F: Journal of Rail and Rapid Transit is a peer-reviewed scientific journal that covers on engineering applicable to rail and rapid transit. The journal was first published in 1989 as a split-off of Proceedings of the Institution of Mechanical Engineers. It is published by SAGE Publications on behalf of the Institution of Mechanical Engineers.

== Abstracting and indexing ==
The journal is abstracted and indexed in:

- Applied Science & Technology Abstracts
- Applied Science & Technology Index
- Civil Engineering Abstracts
- Current Contents/Engineering, Computer, & Technology
- Engineered Materials Abstracts
- SAE International/Global Mobility Database
- Inspec
- Mechanical Engineering Abstracts
- Metals Abstracts/METADEX
- Science Citation Index

According to the Journal Citation Reports, its 2013 impact factor is 0.743, ranking it 76th out of 124 journals in the category "Engineering, Civil", 76th out of 126 journals in the category "Engineering, Mechanical", and 20th out of 30 journals in the category "Transportation Science and Technology".
