= Anatoly Zayats =

British experimental physics

Anatoly Zayats MAE FInstP FRSC
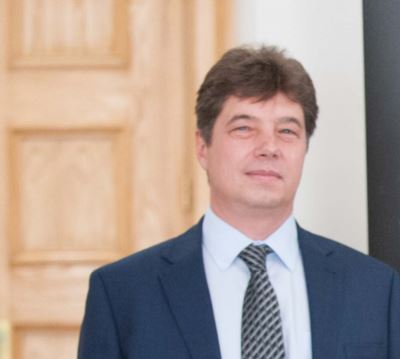
- Zayats pictured at the King's ascension into the London Centre for Nanotechnology
- Born: Volodymyr, Ukraine
- Education: Moscow Institute of Physics and Technology
- Known for: Nonlinear Optics; Nanophotonics
- Awards: Royal Society Wolfson Research Merit Award (2013), Humboldt Prize (2021)
- Scientific career
- Fields: Plasmonics; Photonics; Metamaterials; High resolution optical imaging
- Workplaces: King's College London
- Thesis: Optical Properties of Binary Complexes of Defects in CdS Single Crystals (1989)
- Doctoral advisor: A. N. Georgobiani
- Website: www.kcl.ac.uk/people/anatoly-zayats

Anatoly V. Zayats MAE FInstP FRSC is a British experimental physicist of Ukrainian origin known for his work in nanophotonics, plasmonics, metamaterials and applied nanotechnology. He is currently a Chair in Experimental Physics and the head of the Photonics & Nanotechnology Group at King's College London. He is a co-director of the London Centre for Nanotechnology and the London Institute for Advanced Light Technologies

== Education ==
Zayats was educated at the Moscow Institute of Physics and Technology.

== Career and research ==
Zayats's current research interests are in areas of nanophotonics, plasmonics and metamaterials, optical spin-orbit effects and topological photonics, nonlinear and ultrafast optics and spectroscopy, photo-active nanomaterials, scanning probe microscopy and optical properties of surfaces, thin films, semiconductors and low-dimensional structures.

Zayats may be most widely-known for his contributions to the development of nano-optics of surface plasmon polaritons, nonlinear plasmonics and nanophotonics, hyperbolic and epsilon-near-zero metamaterials and their applications in ultrasensitive bio- and chemical sensing and nonlinear optics, plasmonic hot-electrons for photochemical transformations as well photonic spin-orbit effects in nanophotonics for directional routing of guided modes, directional optical forces and discovery of photonic skyrmions.

Zayats currently leads the Engineering and Physical Sciences Research Council programme grant 'New perspectives in photocatalysis and near-surface chemistry: catalysis meets plasmonics' (2022-2028) (CPLAS), investigating light-driven energy-conversion at the nanoscale for stimulating chemical transformations. This is a multidisciplinary collaborative project between King's College London, Imperial College London and the UK Catalysis Hub. CPLAS is the third EPSRC programme grant that Zayats has led; Active Plasmonics ran from 2009 to 2015. and Reactive Plasmonics, from 2015 to 2021.

Zayats is the holder of the ERC Advanced Grants Integrated Plasmonic Metamaterials (2013-2018) and Integrating Complex Beams and Metasurfaces.(2018-2023).

In 2017, together with Stefan Maier (Imperial College London) and Franco Cacialli (UCL), he founded the London Institute for Advanced Light Technologies, a joint virtual research centre between King's College London, Imperial College London and University College London.

Zayats is a founding co-editor-in-chief of the SPIE-Chinese Laser Press journal Advanced Photonics.

=== Publications ===
Zayats's research has been published in leading peer reviewed scientific journals.

== Awards and honours ==
- 2026 – Elected Fellow of the Royal Academy of Engineering
- 2022 – Elected Member of Academia Europaea
- 2021 - Humboldt Prize
- 2018 - Distinguished Lecture in Transformative Science and Engineering (Nanjing University, China)
- 2014 - Fellow of the Royal Society of Chemistry (FRSC)
- 2013 - Royal Society Wolfson Research Merit Award
- 2012 - Fellow of SPIE
- 2008 - Fellow of The Optical Society
- 2006 - Fellow of the Institute of Physics (FInstP)
