= Burhan Dajani =

Palestinian academic and economist (1921–2000)

- Born: 1921; Jaffa, Mandatory Palestine
- Died: 15 September 2000 (aged 78–79); Amman, Jordan
- Education: American University of Beirut; Jerusalem Government Law School
- Occupation: Academic

Academic work
- Discipline: Economics
- Institutions: American University of Beirut

Burhan Dajani (Arabic: برهان الدجاني, romanized: Burhān Dajānī; 1921–2000) was a Palestinian academic, jurist and economist. He served as the secretary general of the Beirut-based Union of Arab Chambers of Commerce, Industry and Agriculture and taught economics at the American University of Beirut.

== Early life and education ==
Dajani was born in Jaffa, Mandatory Palestine, in 1921. He graduated from the American University of Beirut in 1940. He also graduated from the Government Law School in Jerusalem in 1948 obtaining a law diploma.

== Career and activities ==
Following his graduation in 1940 Dajani joined his alma mater as a lecturer and worked there until 1944. He founded a newspaper entitled Al Hadaf in Jerusalem in 1950. He became the secretary general of the Union of Arab Chambers of Commerce, Industry and Agriculture based in Beirut in 1957 and held the post for a long time. He was one of the founders of the Institute for Palestine Studies which was established in 1963. The other founders of the institute were Walid Khalidi, Constantin Zureiq and Isam Ashour. Dajani also served as a member of the Arab League's economic advisory council. He continued to teach economics at the American University of Beirut. Dajani was also instrumental in the establishment of the academic title Journal of Palestine Studies along with Walid Khalidi, Fuad Sarruf and Constantin Zureiq. He joined the Center for Arab Unity Studies in Beirut as a board member in 1978.

In addition to scholarly articles Dajani coedited a book entitled Economic Interests in the Service of Arab Causes in 1973. His articles were published as a book, The Political, Economic, and Literary Writings of Burhan Dajani, in 2004.

== Later years and death ==
Dajani settled in Amman, Jordan, after his retirement. He died there on 15 September 2000.
