= List of monetary policy journals =

List of academic journals on monetary policy

This is a list of monetary policy journals, which publish research related to monetary policy, central banking, macroeconomics, and related areas.

== Journals ==
- American Economic Journal: Macroeconomics
- American Economic Review
- Economic Policy
- European Economic Review
- International Journal of Central Banking
- International Review of Economics & Finance
- Journal of Banking and Finance
- Journal of Economic Dynamics and Control
- Journal of Financial Economics
- Journal of Financial Econometrics
- Journal of Financial Stability
- Journal of International Money and Finance
- Journal of Monetary Economics
- Journal of Money, Credit and Banking
- Journal of Political Economy
- Macroeconomic Dynamics
- Oxford Review of Economic Policy
- Review of Economic Dynamics
- The Quarterly Journal of Economics
- The Review of Financial Studies

== See also ==
- List of economics journals
- Lists of academic journals
- Monetary policy of the United States, European, Sweden, Philippines, India, and China
- Monetary sovereignty
