= Susmita Bose =

American engineer

- Born: Ranaghat, West Bengal, India
- Spouse: Amit Bandyopadhyay
- Children: 2 (Shohom and Aditya)
- Awards: Received Presidential Early Career Award for Scientists and Engineers (NSF PECASE), Fellow of MRS, AAAS, NAI

Academic background
- Education: BSc., Chemistry, 1990, University of Kalyani; M.S., Chemistry, 1992, Indian Institute of Technology Kanpur; PhD, 1998, Physical-Organic Chemistry, Rutgers University

Academic work
- Institutions: Washington State University
- Main interests: 3D printing, medicinal compounds, drug delivery, surface modified metal implants for hip knee implants and bone tissue engineering
- Website: https://mme.wsu.edu/susmita-bose/

Susmita Bose FRSC is an Indian-American scientist and engineer, best known for her research on biomaterials, 3D printing or additive manufacturing of bone implants and natural medicine. She is the Herman and Brita Lindholm Endowed Chair Professor in the School of Mechanical and Materials Engineering at Washington State University.

== Early life and education ==
Bose was born and raised in India, and was inspired to pursue a career in chemistry by her high school teacher mother. Following her passion for chemistry in 1990, she graduated with a B.S. degree in chemistry Honors from the University of Kalyani and pursued a Master's degree from the Indian Institute of Technology (IIT) Kanpur. She then moved to North America to receive her Ph.D. from Rutgers University.

== Career ==
Bose’s research interest lies at the interface of chemistry, materials science and engineering, bioengineering and biology, focusing on bone scaffolds, implant materials and drug delivery vehicles. Bose and her husband, Amit Bandyopadhyay, who was a postdoctoral fellow at Rutgers, moved from New Jersey to Washington when he was offered a position in the School of Mechanical and Materials Engineering at Washington State University. After her Ph.D. in 1998, Bose was hired as a research scientist and promoted to assistant professor in 2001, to an Associate level in 2006 and to the full professor in 2010.

As a professor at Washington State University (WSU), Bose began conducting nanoscale bone implant material research with the goal of better adapting implants to body tissue. As a result of her “innovative and multidisciplinary research on bioactive bone implants," she was awarded the Presidential Early Career Award for Scientists and Engineers. The following year, she co-received a $750,000 grant to establish a biomedical materials research laboratory at WSU with her colleagues Professors Amit Bandyopadhyay and Howard Hosick. By 2009, Bose became the first person of Indian descent to receive the Karl Schwartzwalder-Professional Achievement in Ceramic Engineering Award from the American Ceramic Society’s National Institute of Ceramic Engineers. A few years later, Bose and her research team discovered they could strengthen calcium phosphate by adding silica, zinc oxide and other metal oxides. Based on this discovery, the team began using a 3D printer to print patient-specific, biocompatible scaffolds that could support new bone cell growth and eventually replacement bone tissue. In 2013, she was elected a Fellow of the American Institute for Medical and Biological Engineering. The following year, Bose, her colleagues Professors Amit Bandyopadhyay and William Dernell received a $1.8 million National Institutes of Health grant for a period of five year to focus on bone implants inside the human body.

Following her passion for natural medicinal compounds, Bose and her students developed ways to deliver curcumin and other natural compounds to stop bone cancer cell growth without inhibiting healthy bone cells. That same year, she was elected a Fellow of the Royal Society of Chemistry.

Bose’s group research on 3D printed ceramic bone scaffolds with controlled chemistry for hard tissue engineering and natural medicinal compounds was featured by the AP, BBC, NPR, CBS News, MSNBC, ABC News, and many other TV, radio stations, magazines, and news sites all over the world, including R&D magazine and ScienceDaily.

== Awards ==
Bose received the CAREER Award in 2002 and the Presidential Early Career Award for Scientists and Engineers (PECASE) in 2004 from the National Science Foundation (NSF) for her work on nanoscale calcium phosphates for bone implants and drug delivery. Her interdisciplinary research, in collaboration with other colleagues, has been funded by several foundations, e.g. Murdock and Keck foundations, several state and federal agencies, e.g. NSF, ONR, NIH (NIBIB, NIAMS, NIDCR as PI) as well as industries.

- 2019, she became Fellow in Royal Society of Chemistry (RSC).
- 2019, she received WSU Sahlin Faculty excellence award for research scholarship and arts
- 2018, Bose was elected a Fellow of the Materials Research Society (MRS).
- Distinguished Faculty Address Award by Washington State University (DFA) in 2018.
- 2018, Bose became the Fellow of American Society for Materials (ASM International)
- 2017, she became the Fellow of the National Academy of Inventors (NAI), and elected to the Washington State Academy of Science (WSAS).
- 2016, She was elected as Fellow of the American Association for the Advancement of Science (AAAS).
- 2016, she received International Society for Ceramics in Medicine research excellence award
- 2015, Bose was the recipient of a ‘Women to Watch in Life Science’ award from the Washington Biotechnology and Biomedical Association
- 2014, She received Richard M. Fulrath Award, an international award, that is given to a US academician under age 45 from the American Ceramic Society (ACerS).
- 2013, she was elected a Fellow of the American Institute for Medical and Biological Engineering.
- 2009, Bose became the first person of Indian descent to receive the Karl Schwartzwalder-Professional Achievement in Ceramic Engineering (PACE) Award from the American Ceramic Society’s National Institute of Ceramic Engineers.
- 2006, she was invited by the US National Academy of Sciences to the Chinese-American Kavli symposium as a “Kavli fellow”.
