= Journal of Applied Remote Sensing =

- Discipline: Remote sensing
- Language: English
- Edited by: Qian (Jenny) Du

Publication details
- History: 2007-present
- Publisher: SPIE
- Frequency: Upon acceptance
- Open access: Yes
- License: Creative Commons Attribution 3.0 Unported License
- Impact factor: 1.7 (2022)

Standard abbreviations
- ISO 4: J. Appl. Remote Sens.

Indexing
- ISSN: 1931-3195
- OCLC no.: 70269450

Links
- Journal homepage; Online access; Online archive

The Journal of Applied Remote Sensing is a peer-reviewed open access scientific journal published by SPIE. It covers all aspects of remote sensing and was established in 2007. The editor-in-chief is Qian Du (Mississippi State University).

== Abstracting and indexing ==
This journal is indexed by the following databases:

- Science Citation Index Expanded
- Current Contents/ Agriculture, Biology & Environmental Sciences
- Current Contents/ Physical, Chemical & Earth Sciences
- Inspec
- Scopus
- EI/Compendex
- Astrophysics Data System

According to the Journal Citation Reports, the journal has a 2025 impact factor of 1.8.

== See also ==
- ISPRS Journal of Photogrammetry and Remote Sensing
- Remote Sensing

"Journal of Applied Remote Sensing". 2019 Journal Citation Reports. Web of Science (Science ed.). Thomson Reuters. 2020.
