= Proceedings of the Institution of Mechanical Engineers, Part N =

Proceedings of the Institution of Mechanical Engineers, Part N: Journal of Nanoengineering and Nanosystems
- Discipline: Nanoengineering
- Language: English
- Edited by: Vasileios Koutsos

Publication details
- History: 2004-present
- Publisher: SAGE Publications (United Kingdom)
- Frequency: Quarterly

Standard abbreviations
- ISO 4: Proc. Inst. Mech. Eng. N

Indexing
- ISSN: 1740-3499 (print); 2041-3092 (web)
- LCCN: 2005256039
- OCLC no.: 61369549

Links
- Journal homepage; Online access; Online archive

The Proceedings of the Institution of Mechanical Engineers, Part N: Journal of Nanoengineering and Nanosystems is a peer-reviewed scientific journal covering nanoscale engineering, nanoscience, and nanotechnology. It was established in 2004 and is published by SAGE Publications on behalf of the Institution of Mechanical Engineers.

== Abstracting and indexing ==
The journal is abstracted and indexed in Scopus, Compendex, and CSA's Advanced Polymers Abstracts, Composites Industry Abstracts, and Earthquake Engineering Abstracts.
