= Critical Reviews in Biomedical Engineering =

- Discipline: Biomedical engineering
- Language: English
- Edited by: Anthony J. McGoron

Publication details
- History: 1972-Present
- Publisher: Begell House (United States)

Standard abbreviations
- ISO 4: Crit. Rev. Biomed. Eng.

Indexing
- ISSN: 0278-940X (print); 1943-619X (web)

Links
- Journal homepage

Critical Reviews in Biomedical Engineering is a bimonthly peer-reviewed scientific journal published by Begell House covering biomedical engineering, bioengineering, clinical engineering, and related subjects. The editor-in-chief is Anthony J. McGoron.
