= Nejla Abu-Izzedin =

Lebanese anthropologist

- نجلاء أبو عزِّ الدين
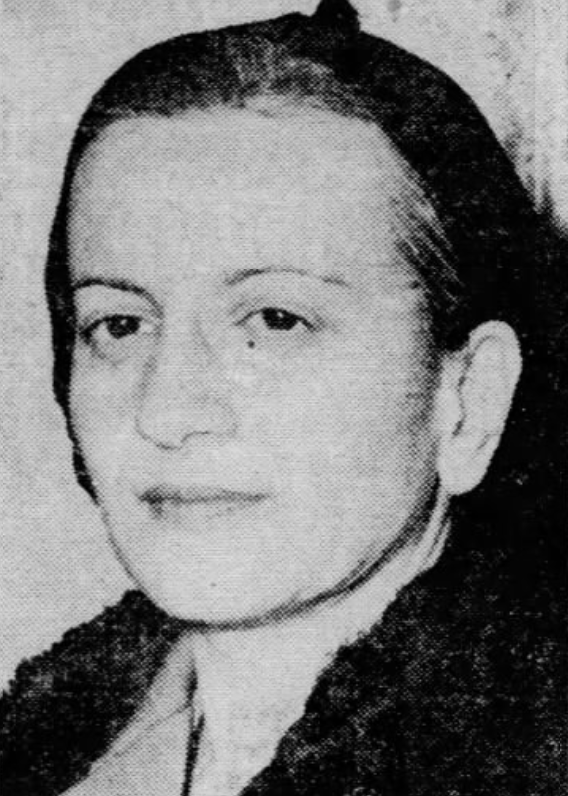
- Nejla Abu-Izzedin, from a 1946 Canadian newspaper
- Born: May 22, 1907; Abadiyeh, Greater Syria (now Lebanon)
- Died: 2008 (aged 100–101)
- Other names: Nejla Izzedin, Najla Abou Ezzedine, Najla Abu Izzeddin, Naglaa Abu Ezz el-Din
- Occupation(s): Writer, anthropologist, diplomat, educator, historian

Nejla Mustafa Abu-Izzedin (Arabic: نجلاء أبو عزِّ الدين; May 22, 1907 – 2008), also known as Najla Abu Izzeddin, was a Lebanese anthropologist, educator, historian, and diplomat. She was a lecturer on Arab topics in North America in the 1940s and 1950s, and author of several histories of the Arab world. She co-founded the Institute for Palestinian Studies in Beirut in 1963.

== Early life and education ==
Izzedin was born in Abadiyeh, the daughter of Mustafa Izzedin and Halineh Izzedin. Her family were Druze; her father was a military physician and public health official. Her uncles were journalist Suleiman Abu Izzaddin and judge Muhammad Abu 'Izz al-Din. She attended the American School for Girls in Beirut, the Lycée Racine in Paris, and graduated from Vassar College in 1930. In 1934, she became the first Arab woman to earn a Ph.D. at the University of Chicago. Her master's thesis was titled "Taha Husain and the dawn of Islam", and her doctoral dissertation was titled "The racial origins of the Druzes" (1934).

== Career ==
Izzedin taught anthropology at a teachers' college in Baghdad after graduate school, and was the first woman to teach male students there. She also taught at the American College in Beirut, and was principal of a girls' school in Damascus. During World War II she lived in London, where she did research for her book on Arab history, and worked on establishing the Arab League.

Beginning in 1945, Izzedin was on the staff of the Washington, D.C., office of the Arab League. She was a delegate to the United Nations Conference on International Organization, held in San Francisco in 1945. She lectured in the United States and Canada in the 1940s, and after the publication of her book, The Arab World, Past, Present, and Future (1953), with sponsorship from the American Friends of the Middle East. She often addressed women's organizations, including the YWCA, the Daughters of the American Revolution, the League of Women Voters, and the American Association of University Women (AAUW). Some Jewish organizations opposed her public appearances. She corresponded with scholar Alphonse Mingana.

Izzedin became a member of the American Oriental Society in 1931. She was a founder of the Institute for Palestinian Studies in Beirut in 1963.

== Publications ==
- The History of Ibn al-Furāt (1939, 2 volumes, co-edited with Costi K. Zurayk)
- The Arab World, Past, Present, and Future (1953)
- Nasser of the Arabs (1975 in French, 1981 in Arabic)
- The Druzes: A New Study of their History, Faith, and Society (1984, 2nd ed. 1993)
