= Giancarlo Genta =

Italian machine design and construction professor

Giancarlo Genta (born 1948 in Turin, Italy) is Professor of Machine Design and Construction at the Polytechnic University of Turin. His areas of professional interest include vibration, vehicle design, magnetic bearings, and rotordynamics. He has written or co-authored more than 50 articles in professional publications. He has published extensively in the field of SETI research.

Since 2018 he is the chair of the automotive evolution class at Politecnico di Torino.

== Selected publications ==
- Genta, G., Introduction to the Mechanics of Space Robots, Springer, 2012, ISBN 978-94-007-1795-4 [received Engineering Science Award from International Academy of Astronautics in 2014]
- G. Genta, M. Rycroft, Will space actually be the final frontier of humankind?, Acta Astronautica, Vol. 58, 2006, pp. 287–295.
- Genta, G. (2005). Dynamics of Rotating Systems. Springer. ISBN 978-0-387-20936-4.
- G. Genta, On a Persisting Misunderstanding on the Role of Hysteretic Damping in Rotordynamics, Journal of Vibration and Acoustics, Vol. 126, July 2004, 469–471.
- G. Genta, N. Amati, Mobility on Planetary Surfaces: May Walking Machines be a Viable Alternative?, Planetary and Space Science, 52, 2004, pp. 31–40.
- Genta, G. (1997). Motor Vehicle Dynamics: Modeling and Simulation. World Scientific. ISBN 978-981-02-2911-5
- G. Genta, Kinetic Energy Storage, Butterworths, London, 1985
