= SAICE Journal =

- Discipline: Civil engineering
- Language: English
- Edited by: Gerhard Heymann

Publication details
- History: 2008-present
- Publisher: SAICE (South Africa)
- Frequency: Quarterly
- Open access: Yes

Standard abbreviations
- ISO 4: SAICE J.

Indexing
- ISSN: 1021-2019 (print); 2309-8775 (web)
- OCLC no.: 847864602

Links
- Journal homepage; Online access

The SAICE Journal is a quarterly peer-reviewed open access scientific journal covering all aspects of civil engineering relevant to Africa. The journal is indexed in the Science Citation Index Expanded.
