= Journal of Fire Protection Engineering =

- Discipline: Engineering
- Language: English
- Edited by: Ronald L Alpert

Publication details
- History: 1989-2013
- Publisher: SAGE Publications
- Frequency: Quarterly
- Impact factor: 0.154 (2010)

Standard abbreviations
- ISO 4: J. Fire Prot. Eng.

Indexing
- CODEN: JFPEEN
- ISSN: 1042-3915 (print); 1532-172X (web)
- LCCN: 96657471
- OCLC no.: 45216028

Links
- Journal homepage; Online access; Online archive

The Journal of Fire Protection Engineering was a peer-reviewed academic journal that published papers in the field(s) of engineering up to 2013. It has been merged with Fire Technology. It was published by SAGE Publications on behalf of the Society of Fire Protection Engineers.

== Scope ==
The Journal of Fire Protection Engineering was an international journal that sought to provide a resource for fire protection engineers, fire safety engineers and other engineering professionals for accessible and helpful descriptions and advice on the use of state-of-the-art engineering methods. The journal featured case studies which sought to demonstrate how various advanced engineering methods and other valuable data can be used in the application of fire safety design and also in the evaluation of buildings and transportation vehicles.

== Abstracting and indexing ==
The journal is abstracted and indexed in, among other databases: Academic Search Premier, Current Contents, International Building Services Abstracts, SCOPUS, and the Social Sciences Citation Index. According to the Journal Citation Reports, its 2010 impact factor is 0.154, ranking it 211th out of 220 journals in the category 'Materials Science'; and 103rd of 115 journals in the category 'Engineering, Civil'.
