= Proceedings of the Institution of Mechanical Engineers, Part M =

Proceedings of the Institution of Mechanical Engineers, Part M: Journal of Engineering for the Maritime Environment
- Discipline: Ocean engineering
- Language: English
- Edited by: R Ajit Shenoi

Publication details
- History: 2002-present
- Publisher: SAGE Publications (United Kingdom)
- Frequency: Quarterly
- Impact factor: 0.458 (2013)

Standard abbreviations
- ISO 4: Proc. Inst. Mech. Eng. M

Indexing
- ISSN: 1475-0902 (print); 2041-3084 (web)
- LCCN: 2002256112
- OCLC no.: 247106969

Links
- Journal homepage; Online access; Online archive

The Proceedings of the Institution of Mechanical Engineers, Part M: Journal of Engineering for the Maritime Environment is a quarterly peer-reviewed scientific journal covering research on the design, production, and operation of engineering artefacts for the maritime environment. The journal covers subjects including naval architecture, marine engineering, offshore/ocean engineering, coastal engineering and port engineering. It was established in 2002 and is published by SAGE Publications on behalf of the Institution of Mechanical Engineers.

== Abstracting and indexing ==
The journal is abstracted and indexed in Scopus and the Science Citation Index Expanded. According to the Journal Citation Reports, the journal has a 2013 impact factor of 0.458.
