= Quantitative InfraRed Thermography Journal =

Quantitative InfraRed Thermography
- Discipline: Electrical and Electronical Engineering
- Language: English
- Edited by: Christiane Maierhofer

Publication details
- History: 2004-present
- Publisher: Taylor & Francis
- Frequency: Biannual
- Impact factor: 1.062 (2016)

Standard abbreviations
- ISO 4: Quant. InfraRed Thermogr. J.

Indexing
- ISSN: 1768-6733 (print); 2116-7176 (web)

Links
- Journal homepage

Quantitative InfraRed Thermography Journal is a peer-reviewed scientific journal published by Taylor & Francis. It was founded in 2004 by the QIRT committee, with a strong connection to the QIRT conference. According to the Journal Citation Reports, the journal has a 2016 impact factor of 1.062.

== Topics covered ==
Quantitative InfraRed Thermography Journal covers all aspects of Thermography, with topics ranging from instrumentation, theoretical and experimental practices, data reduction and image processing related to infrared thermography.

== Article categories ==
The journal publishes articles in the following categories:

- Original research articles
- Research reviews

== Abstracting and indexing ==
The journal is abstracted and indexed in:

- Science Citation Index
- Scopus
