= International Journal of Reliability, Quality and Safety Engineering =

- Discipline: Engineering
- Language: English
- Edited by: Hoang Pham

Publication details
- History: 1994-present
- Publisher: World Scientific (Singapore)
- Frequency: Quarterly

Standard abbreviations
- ISO 4: Int. J. Reliab. Qual. Saf. Eng.

Indexing
- ISSN: 0218-5393 (print); 1793-6446 (web)

Links
- Journal homepage

The International Journal of Reliability, Quality and Safety Engineering is a peer-reviewed scientific journal focusing on the areas of reliability, quality, and safety in engineering. It is published quarterly by World Scientific and is intended to "cover a broad spectrum of issues in manufacturing, computing, software, aerospace, control, nuclear systems, power systems, communication systems, and electronics". This includes articles on quality assurance and engineering, fuzzy logic, performance analysis of systems, and critical systems design.

== Abstracting and indexing ==
The Journal is abstracted and indexed in:

- CSA Health and Safety Abstracts
- CSA Risk Abstracts
- CSA Aquatic Sciences and Fisheries Abstracts (ASFA)
- CSA Selected Water Resources Abstracts
- Chemical Abstracts
- EV2/Compendex
