= Proceedings of the Institution of Mechanical Engineers, Part E =

Proceedings of the Institution of Mechanical Engineers, Part E: Journal of Process Mechanical Engineering
- Discipline: Mechanical engineering
- Language: English
- Edited by: Chris J. Backhouse

Publication details
- History: 1989-present
- Publisher: SAGE Publications on behalf of the Institution of Mechanical Engineers
- Frequency: Quarterly
- Impact factor: 1.606 (2021)

Standard abbreviations
- ISO 4: Proc. Inst. Mech. Eng. E

Indexing
- CODEN: PMEEEF
- ISSN: 0954-4089 (print); 2041-3009 (web)
- LCCN: 89644281
- OCLC no.: 19905122

Links
- Journal homepage; Online access; Online archive

The Proceedings of the Institution of Mechanical Engineers, Part E: Journal of Process Mechanical Engineering is a peer-reviewed scientific journal that covers research on the design and operation of process equipment. The journal was established in 1989 and is published by SAGE Publications on behalf of the Institution of Mechanical Engineers.

== Abstracting and indexing ==
The Journal of Process Mechanical Engineering is abstracted and indexed in Scopus and the Science Citation Index. According to the Journal Citation Reports, the journal has a 2021 impact factor of 1.606, ranking it 92nd out of 126 journals in the category "Engineering, Mechanical".
