= Journal of Medical Imaging =

- Discipline: Medical imaging
- Language: English
- Edited by: Bennett A. Landman

Publication details
- History: 2014–present
- Publisher: SPIE
- Frequency: Bimonthly
- Impact factor: 2.3 (2025)

Standard abbreviations
- ISO 4: J. Med. Imaging

Indexing
- ISSN: 2329-4302 (print); 2329-4310 (web)
- LCCN: 2013201327
- OCLC no.: 846856442

Links
- Journal homepage; Online access; Online archive

Journal of Medical Imaging is a peer-reviewed scientific journal published bimonthly by SPIE. It covers fundamental, applied and translational research on medical imaging. It was established in 2014 and its editor-in-chief is Bennett A. Landman (Vanderbilt University).

== Abstracting and indexing ==
The journal is abstracted and indexed in:

- EBSCO databases
- Ei Compendex
- Inspec
- Science Citation Index Expanded
- Scopus

According to the Journal Citation Reports, the journal has a 2025 impact factor of 2.3.
