= International Journal of Machine Tools and Manufacture =

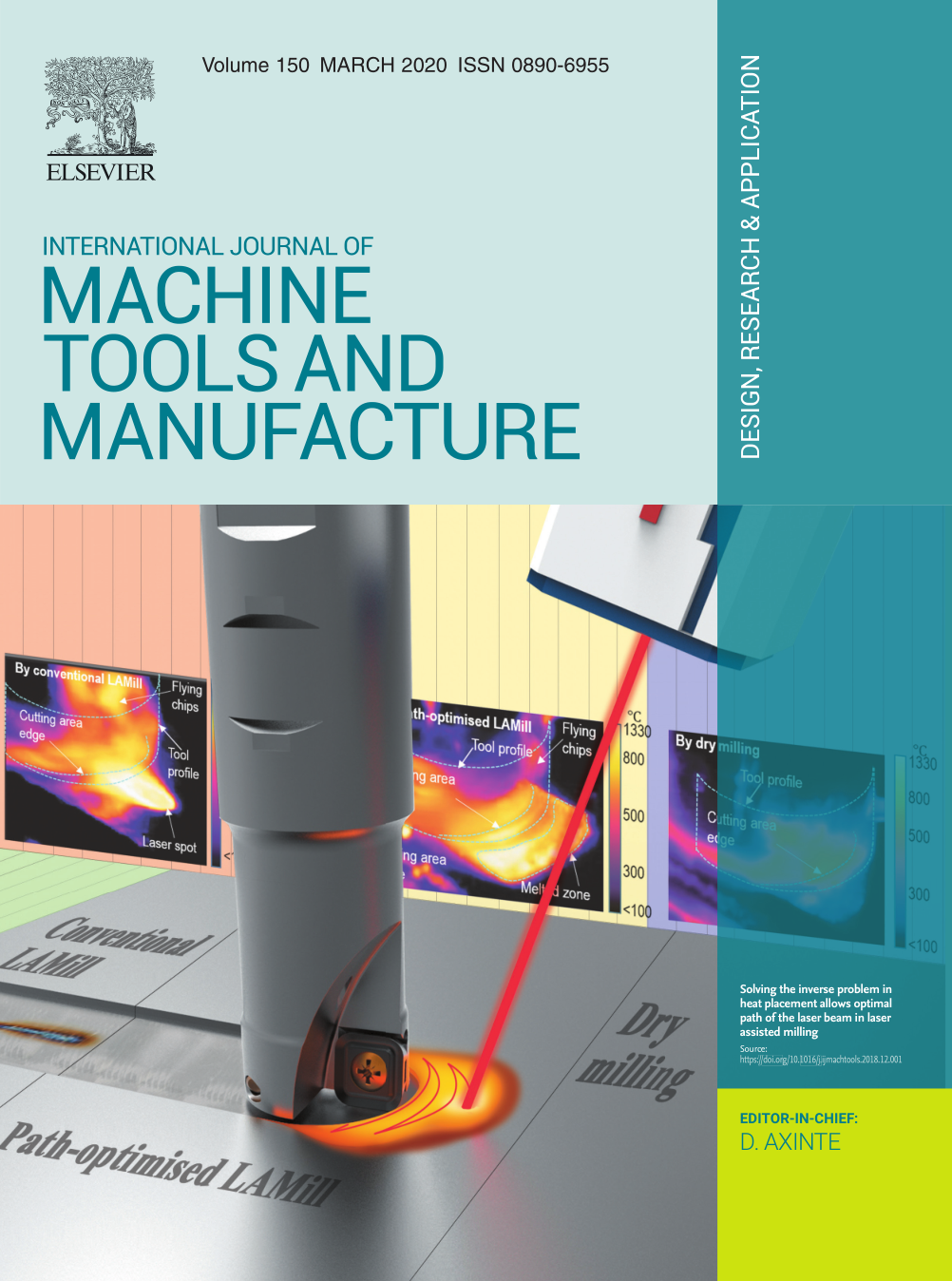
- Discipline: Engineering, Mechanical, Manufacturing
- Language: English
- Edited by: Dragos Axinte

Publication details
- History: 1960–present
- Publisher: Elsevier
- Frequency: 12 issues/year
- Impact factor: 10.331 (2021)

Standard abbreviations
- ISO 4: Int. J. Mach. Tools Manuf.

Indexing
- ISSN: 0890-6955 (print); 1879-2170 (web)

Links
- Journal homepage

The International Journal of Machine Tools and Manufacture is a peer-reviewed scientific journal dedicated to report the latest advancements in the fundamental understanding of mechanics of processes and machines applied to the manufacture of engineering parts made of metals, composites, ceramics and other structural/functional materials.

== History ==
The journal was founded in 1960 in order to publish papers presented at and stimulated by the spin-off interest arising from the annual International Machine Tool Design & Research Conferences, held alternatively at the University of Birmingham and the University of Manchester Institute of Science and Technology.

Originally, it was titled, International Journal of Machine Tool Design and Research. Professor S.A. Tobias, as expert in machine tool dynamics at the University of Birmingham, was the founder of the journal and its first editor-in-chief.

Professor T.A. Dean, an expert in metal forming processes, at the University of Birmingham, took over this journal in 1986, when Professor S. A. Tobias died. On taking over, Professor Dean decided to reflect current developments in manufacturing technology by changing the focus of its aims and scope and renamed it International Journal of Machine Tools & Manufacture. Initially the journal was published by Pergamon Press and in 1991 was bought by Elsevier.

In 2018, following Professor Dean's retirement, Professor Dragos Axinte of University of Nottingham, an expert in machining technology, became editor-in-chief.

== Indexing ==
The journal is abstracted and indexed in Engineering Index, Cambridge Scientific Abstracts, Applied Mechanics Reviews, Current Contents, COMPENDEX, Scopus, INSPEC.

According to the Elsevier Journal Insights, the journal has a 2021 impact factor of 10.331, a 5-year impact factor of 9.67, and a CiteScore of 17.0 with 98% percentile.

== See also ==
- International Journal of Extreme Manufacturing
