= Modern Machine Shop =

American business-to-business publication

- Modern Machine Shop first "modern-digest size" issue (September 2008)
- Type: Business magazine
- Format: Monthly paper and online magazine
- Owner: Gardner Business Media Inc.
- Publisher: Bryce Ellis
- Editor: Brent Donaldson
- Founded: 1928
- Language: English
- Headquarters: Cincinnati, Ohio
- Circulation: 98,571
- ISSN: 0026-8003
- Website: www.mmsonline.com

Modern Machine Shop (ISSN 0026-8003) is a media brand that reports on product and process technology being used in North America's CNC machining and metalworking industry. Modern Machine Shop's audience consists primarily of owners, managers, and engineers at OEMs, contract manufacturers, and job shops that machine for industries including automotive, aerospace, electronics, energy, medical/surgical, defense, and construction equipment.

== Overview ==
Modern Machine Shop (ISSN 0026-8003) is a B2B trade media brand that reports on product and process technology for North America's CNC machining and metalworking industries. Founded in 1928, it is the flagship publication of Gardner Business Media, Inc. and is widely regarded as the leading trade publication for the North American metalworking market.

The brand's primary audience includes owners, managers, and engineers at OEMs, contract manufacturers, and job shops that machine parts for automotive, aerospace, electronics, energy, medical/surgical, defense, and construction equipment industries. The publisher's name is Bryce Ellis, and the Editor-in-Chief's name is Brent Donaldson. Editorial offices are located in Cincinnati, Ohio, USA. Modern Machine Shop is published 12 times per year and is supported by an active digital platform including a website, e-newsletters, podcasts, video content, and live events.

Modern Machine Shop also maintains a suite of multi-media resources which can be used for researching machining and metalworking processes, product technologies and for locating suppliers of equipment and services used in machining and metalworking facilities.

== History ==
Don Gardner launched Modern Machine Shop in Cincinnati, Ohio in 1928 under the banner of Gardner Publications, Inc. The publication's founding coincided with a pivotal era in American manufacturing, as mass production and precision machining were transforming industrial output. The magazine rapidly became the authoritative voice of the metalworking industry, reaching shop owners and machine tool buyers across the country.

Throughout the latter half of the 20th century, Modern Machine Shop expanded its coverage to encompass CNC technology, computer-aided manufacturing, and automation - tracking every major wave of technological change in the industry. Today the brand continues to serve that original mission, while extending its reach through digital channels and original data programs.

== Coverage and Content ==
Modern Machine Shop covers information on CNC machining centers, turning, milling, grinding, workholding, cutting tools, metrology and quality systems, CAD/CAM software, robotics and automation, and manufacturing management. The brand is known for in-depth application stories featuring real shops and facilities, reporting on how specific technologies are being implemented on the production floor.

The brand operates the annual Modern Machine Shop Top Shops Benchmarking Survey, one of the manufacturing industry's most recognized performance benchmarking programs, identifying top-performing machining operations across North America based on technology adoption, business performance, and workforce development metrics.

== Sample editorial calendar topics ==
Month	Special Coverage	Better Production	Modern Equipment Review
January	Medical Machining; Cutting Tools	Machining Centers	Aerospace Machining
February	EDM; CAD/CAM	Turning	Robotics & Automation
March	Measurement & Quality; Special Coverage: Aerospace Machining	Workholding	Grinding
April	Production Machining	Cutting Tools	Turning
May	Workholding; Special Coverage: Micro Machining	Measurement	Lasers & Waterjet Machining
June	Die/Mold Machining	Software	Medical Machining
July	Multitasking Machines	Cutting Tools	Machining Centers
August	Hole Making; Special Coverage: Lean Manufacturing	Turning	Robots & Automation
September	Machining for Oil-Field & Energy Quality Systems	Software	Measurement
October	Milling & Machining Centers; EMO Show Issue	Workholding	Laser & Waterjet Machining
November	Manufacturer Software; Special Coverage: Rapid Prototyping & Rapid Manufacturing	Cutting Tools	Grinding
December	Turning; Grinding Technology	Machining Centers	Workholding

== Related Properties ==
Modern Machine Shop Mexico is a Spanish-language edition of the brand serving the Mexican manufacturing market. The brand also partners with the Precision Machined Products Association (PMPA) through Production Machining magazine and maintains close editorial ties with sister brands MoldMaking Technology, Production Machining, and Additive Manufacturing Media within the Gardner Business Media portfolio.

== Other Gardner Business Media brands ==
- AutoBeat
- Modern Machine Shop Mexico
- MoldMaking Technology
- Production Machining
- Products Finishing
- Products Finishing Mexico
- Plastics Technology
- Plastics Technology Mexico
- CompositesWorld
- Additive Manufacturing
