= Proceedings of the Institution of Mechanical Engineers, Part A =

Proceedings of the Institution of Mechanical Engineers, Part A: Journal of Power and Energy
- Discipline: Mechanical engineering
- Language: English
- Edited by: Richard C. Stone

Publication details
- History: 1990-present
- Publisher: SAGE Publications on behalf of the Institution of Mechanical Engineers
- Frequency: 8/year
- Impact factor: 0.596 (2013)

Standard abbreviations
- ISO 4: Proc. Inst. Mech. Eng. A

Indexing
- CODEN: PMAEET
- ISSN: 0957-6509 (print); 2041-2967 (web)
- LCCN: 93657487
- OCLC no.: 21531945

Links
- Journal homepage; Online access; Online archive

The Proceedings of the Institution of Mechanical Engineers, Part A: Journal of Power and Energy is a peer-reviewed scientific journal that covers research on the technology of energy conversion systems. The journal was established in 1990 and is published by SAGE Publications on behalf of the Institution of Mechanical Engineers.

== Abstracting and indexing ==
The journal is abstracted and indexed by:

- Science Citation Index Expanded
- Current Contents/Engineering, Computing & Technology
- Applied Science & Technology Index
- Civil Engineering Abstracts
- Engineered Materials Abstracts
- Fluidex
- Global Mobility Database
- Inspec
- Mechanical Engineering Abstracts
- Metals Abstracts/METADEX

According to the Journal Citation Reports, its 2013 impact factor is 0.596, ranking it 91st out of 126 journals in the category "Engineering, Mechanical".
