= List of University of California Press journals =

This is a list of journals published by the University of California Press.

== List of journals ==
- 19th-Century Music
- Advances in Global Health
- Afterimage: The Journal of Media Arts and Cultural Criticism
- American Biology Teacher
- Asian Survey
- Boom: A Journal of California
- California History
- California Management Review
- Civic Sociology
- Classical Antiquity
- Contemporary Arab Affairs
- Current History
- Departures in Critical Qualitative Research
- Ethnic Studies Review
- Federal Sentencing Reporter
- Feminist Media Histories
- Film Quarterly
- Gastronomica: The Journal of Critical Food Studies
- Historical Studies in the Natural Sciences
- International Review of Qualitative Research
- Journal of Autoethnography
- Journal of Medieval Worlds
- Journal of the American Musicological Society
- The Journal of Musicology
- Journal of Palestine Studies
- Journal of the Society of Architectural Historians
- Journal of Vietnamese Studies
- Latin American and Latinx Visual Culture
- Mexican Studies/Estudios Mexicanos
- Music Perception
- National Review of Black Politics
- New Criminal Law Review
- Nineteenth-Century Literature
- Nova Religio: The Journal of Alternative and Emergent Religions
- Pacific Historical Review
- The Public Historian
- Religion and American Culture
- Representations
- Resonance: The Journal of Sound and Culture
- Rhetorica
- Sociology of Development
- Southern California Quarterly
- Studies in Late Antiquity
