= Tadeusz Kaczorek =

Polish electrical engineer (born 1932)

Tadeusz Kaczorek (born April 27, 1932) from the Warsaw University of Technology, Warsaw, Poland was named Fellow of the Institute of Electrical and Electronics Engineers (IEEE) in 2013 for contributions to industrial control systems.
