= Proceedings of the Institution of Mechanical Engineers, Part B =

Proceedings of the Institution of Mechanical Engineers, Part B: Journal of Engineering Manufacture
- Discipline: Manufacturing engineering
- Language: English
- Edited by: Paul G. Maropoulos

Publication details
- History: 1989-present
- Publisher: SAGE Publications on behalf of the Institution of Mechanical Engineers
- Frequency: Monthly
- Impact factor: 0.661 (2013)

Standard abbreviations
- ISO 4: Proc. Inst. Mech. Eng. B

Indexing
- CODEN: PIBMEU
- ISSN: 0954-4054 (print); 2041-2975 (web)
- LCCN: 90656627
- OCLC no.: 705259037

Links
- Journal homepage; Online access; Online archive

The Proceedings of the Institution of Mechanical Engineers, Part B: Journal of Engineering Manufacture is a peer-reviewed scientific journal that covers research on manufacturing engineering. The journal was established in 1989 and is published by SAGE Publications on behalf of the Institution of Mechanical Engineers.

== Abstracting and indexing ==
The journal is abstracted and indexed in Scopus and the Science Citation Index. According to the Journal Citation Reports, its 2013 impact factor is 0.661, ranking it 32nd out of 39 journals in the category "Engineering, Manufacturing" and 80th out of 126 journals in the category "Engineering, Mechanical".
