= Proceedings of the Institution of Mechanical Engineers, Part O =

Proceedings of the Institution of Mechanical Engineers, Part O: Journal of Risk and Reliability
- Discipline: Mechanical engineering, statistical modelling
- Language: English
- Edited by: John D Andrews

Publication details
- History: 2006-present
- Publisher: SAGE Publications (United Kingdom)
- Frequency: Quarterly
- Impact factor: 0.775 (2013)

Standard abbreviations
- ISO 4: Proc. Inst. Mech. Eng. O

Indexing
- ISSN: 1748-006X (print); 1748-0078 (web)
- LCCN: 2006251125
- OCLC no.: 70962063

Links
- Journal homepage; Online access; Online archive

The Proceedings of the Institution of Mechanical Engineers, Part O: Journal of Risk and Reliability is a quarterly peer-reviewed academic journal that covers risk analysis and reliability engineering, including engineering, mathematical modelling and statistical analysis. The journal was established in 2006 and is published by SAGE Publications on behalf of the Institution of Mechanical Engineers. According to the Journal Citation Reports, its 2013 impact factor is 0.775.

== Abstracting and indexing ==
The journal is abstracted and indexed in Scopus and the Science Citation Index Expanded.
