= List of journals published by Sri Lankan universities =

This is a list of academic journals published by Sri Lankan universities.

== University of Colombo ==
- The Ceylon Journal of Medical Science
- Colombo Business Journal - Faculty of Management and Finance
- International Journal of Advance in ICT for Emerging Regions (ICTer)
- Sri Lanka Journal of International Law — Faculty of Law, University of Colombo
- Student Medical Journal – Faculty of Medicine
- University of Colombo Review
- Colombo Law Review - Faculty of Law
- The Colombo Law Journal (Student Journal) Faculty of Law

== Eastern University, Sri Lanka ==
- AGRIEST — journal of agricultural sciences
- Journal of Science — Faculty of Science

== University of Jaffna ==
- Journal of Business Studies - Faculty of Management Studies and Commerce

== Open University of Sri Lanka ==
- Journal of Engineering and Technology
- OUSL Journal
- VISTAS Journal — Faculty of Humanities, Social Sciences

== University of Kelaniya ==
- Journal of Humanities-Faculty of Humanities
- Journal of Science — Faculty of Science
- Journal of Social Sciences- Faculty of Social Sciences
- Kalyani Journal of University of Kelaniya - University of Kelaniya
- Kelaniya Journal of Human Resource Management — Department of Human Resource Management
- Kelaniya Journal of Management - Faculty of Commerce & Management Studies
- Sri Lanka Journal of Marketing — Department of Marketing Management
- Journal of Social Statistics - (JSS) - Department of Social Statistics

== University of Moratuwa ==
- Bhumi - the planning research journal of University of Moratuwa, Department of Town & Country Planning
- Journal of the University Librarians Association of Sri Lanka

== University of Peradeniya ==
- The Ceylon Journal of Historical and Social Studies
- Ceylon Science Journal (Biological Sciences) - Faculty of Science
- Modern Sri Lanka Studies
- The Sri Lanka Journal of the Humanities
- University of Ceylon Review
- Sri Lanka Journal of Forensic Medicine, Science & Law - Department of Forensic Medicine, Faculty of Medicine

== Rajarata University of Sri Lanka ==
- Rajarata Journal of Social Sciences — Department of Social Sciences
- Journal of Management Matters — Faculty of Management Studies

== University of Ruhuna ==
- International Journal of Tropical Agricultural Research & Extension
- Faculty Journal of Humanities and Social Sciences
- Rohana - research journal of the University of Ruhuna
- Ruhuna Journal of Management and Finance (RJMF)
- Ruhuna Journal of Science
- Social Sciences and Humanities Review
- Prathimana Ruhuna Journal of Sociology
- Vimarshi Sociological Journal
- Ghanagaweshi Journal of Buddhist Philosophy

== Sabaragamuwa University of Sri Lanka ==
- Journal of Agricultural Sciences
- Sabaragamuwa University Journal
- South Asian Journal of Tourism and Hospitality
- Asian Journal of Management Studies

== South Eastern University of Sri Lanka ==
- The Journal of Kalam
- Journal of Management

== Bhiksu University of Sri Lanka ==
- Pravachana:The Journal of Bhiksu University of Sri Lanka

== University of Sri Jayewardenepura ==
- Journal of Tropical Forestry and Environment — Department of Forestry and Environmental Science
- Sri Lankan Journal of Human Resource Management — Department of Human Resource Management, Faculty of Management Studies and commerce
- Sri Lankan Journal of Real Estate — Department of Estate Management and Valuation
- Vidyodaya Journal of Management
- Vidyodaya Journal of Social Science

== Wayamba University of Sri Lanka ==
- Applied Economics & Business — Department of Agribusiness Management
- Journal of Food and Agriculture — Faculty of Agriculture and Plantation Management and Faculty of Livestock Fisheries and Nutrition
- Sri Lankan Journal of Banking and Finance — Department of Banking and Finance
- Wayamba Journal of Animal Science - Department of Livestock and Avian Sciences
- Wayamba Journal of Management — Department of Business Management
- Journal of Insurance and Finance — Department of Insurance and Valuation
