= Proceedings of the Institution of Mechanical Engineers, Part I =

Proceedings of the Institution of Mechanical Engineers, Part I: Journal of Systems and Control Engineering
- Discipline: Systems engineering, control engineering
- Language: English
- Edited by: James Lam

Publication details
- History: 1991-present
- Publisher: SAGE Publications (United Kingdom)
- Frequency: 8/year
- Impact factor: 1.166 (2018)

Standard abbreviations
- ISO 4: Proc. Inst. Mech. Eng. I

Indexing
- ISSN: 0959-6518 (print); 2041-3041 (web)
- LCCN: 91642790
- OCLC no.: 23684443

Links
- Journal homepage; Online access; Online archive

The Proceedings of the Institution of Mechanical Engineers, Part I: Journal of Systems and Control Engineering is a peer-reviewed scientific journal established 1991 which covers systems and control studies. It is published by SAGE Publications on behalf of the Institution of Mechanical Engineers.

== Abstracting and indexing ==
The journal is abstracted and indexed in Scopus and the Science Citation Index Expanded. According to the Journal Citation Reports, its 2018 impact factor is 1.166.
