= Proceedings of the Institution of Mechanical Engineers, Part K =

Proceedings of the Institution of Mechanical Engineers, Part K: Journal of Multi-body Dynamics
- Discipline: Mechanical engineering, vehicle dynamics
- Language: English
- Edited by: Adolfo Senatore

Publication details
- History: 1999–present
- Publisher: SAGE Publications (United Kingdom)
- Frequency: Quarterly
- Impact factor: 2.1 (2025)

Standard abbreviations
- ISO 4: Proc. Inst. Mech. Eng. K

Indexing
- ISSN: 1464-4193 (print); 2041-3068 (web)
- LCCN: sn99038394
- OCLC no.: 137348448

Links
- Journal homepage; Online access; Online archive

The Proceedings of the Institution of Mechanical Engineers, Part K: Journal of Multi-body Dynamics is a quarterly peer-reviewed scientific journal that covers mechanical design and dynamic analysis of multi-body systems. The journal was established in 1999 and is published by SAGE Publications on behalf of the Institution of Mechanical Engineers.

== Abstracting and indexing ==
The journal is abstracted and indexed in Scopus and the Science Citation Index Expanded. According to the Journal Citation Reports, its 2013 impact factor is 0.415.
