= Journal of Mining Science =

- Discipline: Mining engineering
- Language: English
- Edited by: Victor N. Oparin

Publication details
- Former name: Soviet Mining Science
- History: 1967-present
- Publisher: Springer Science+Business Media
- Frequency: Bimonthly
- Impact factor: 0.353 (2016)

Standard abbreviations
- ISO 4: J. Min. Sci.

Indexing
- CODEN: JMCIEJ
- ISSN: 1062-7391 (print); 1573-8736 (web)
- LCCN: 93645631
- OCLC no.: 48635527

Links
- Journal homepage

The Journal of Mining Science is a bimonthly, peer-reviewed scientific journal published by Springer Science+Business Media that covers all aspects of mining engineering. Topics include geomechanics, information geoscience, the properties and behaviors of rock in various environments and conditions, and various technologies applied to mining. The editor-in-chief is Victor N. Oparin.

Also, this journal is the English translation of Fiziko-Tekhnicheskie Problemy Razrabotki Poleznykh Iskopaemykh, a Russian journal first published in 1967. However, the English translation, the Journal of Mining Science, was first published in September 1992.

== Abstracting and indexing ==
This journal is indexed by the following services:

- Science Citation Index Expanded
- Journal Citation Reports
- SCOPUS
- CSA Illumina
- Academic OneFile
- Academic Search
- AGRICOLA
- Coal Abstracts
- Current Abstracts
- Current Contents/Engineering, Computing and Technology,
- Earthquake Engineering Abstracts
- Engineering Index-Compendex

- Engineering index annual
- Engineering index energy abstracts
- Engineering index monthly

- Engineered Materials Abstracts
- Energy Research Abstracts
- GeoRef
- Materials Science Citation Index
- MINPROC
- Mining Technology Abstracts (MINTEC)
- Summon by Serial Solutions

According to the Journal Citation Reports, the journal has a 2016 impact factor of 0.353.
