= List of computer graphics journals =

List of academic journals in computer graphics

List of computer graphics journals includes notable peer-reviewed scientific and academic journals that focus on computer graphics, visualization, and related areas such as rendering, animation, image processing, and geometric modeling.

== Journals ==
- ACM Transactions on Graphics
- Computers & Graphics
- IEEE Computer Graphics and Applications
- IEEE Transactions on Computer-Aided Design of Integrated Circuits and Systems
- Graphical Models
- Journal of Computer Graphics Techniques
- Presence: Teleoperators and Virtual Environments
- Virtual Reality
- Simulation & Gaming

== See also ==
- Carnegie Mellon IDeATe
- Gnomon School of Visual Effects
- Visualization (graphics)
- List of 3D modeling software
- List of 3D rendering software
- List of computer aided design conferences
- List of computer science journals
- List of scientific journals
- Computer Graphics (newsletter)
