= Journal of Micro/Nanopatterning, Materials, and Metrology =

- Discipline: Microlithography, nanolithography, metrology
- Language: English
- Edited by: Harry Levinson

Publication details
- Former name(s): Journal of Microlithography, Microfabrication, and Microsystems (2002–2006); Journal of Micro/Nanolithography, MEMS, and MOEMS (2007–2020)
- History: 2002–present
- Publisher: SPIE
- Frequency: Quarterly
- Impact factor: 3.4 (2023)

Standard abbreviations
- ISO 4: J. Micro/Nanopatterning Mater. Metrol.

Indexing
- CODEN: JMMMIH
- ISSN: 1932-5150 (print); 2708-8340 (web)
- OCLC no.: 1249108189

Links
- Journal homepage; Online access; Online archive

Journal of Micro/Nanopatterning, Materials, and Metrology is a peer-reviewed scientific journal published quarterly by SPIE. It covers science, development, and practice of micro and nanofabrication processes and metrology. Established in 2002 under the name Journal of Microlithography, Microfabrication, and Microsystems, it was subsequently retitled to Journal of Micro/Nanolithography, MEMS, and MOEMS in 2007. The journal title was changed to its current name in 2021.

The editor-in-chief of the journal is Harry Levinson (HJL Lithography).

== Abstracting and indexing ==
The journal is abstracted and indexed in:

- Current Contents/Electronics & Telecommunications Collection
- Current Contents/Engineering, Computing & Technology
- Current Contents/Physical, Chemical & Earth Sciences
- EBSCO databases
- Ei Compendex
- Inspec
- Science Citation Index Expanded
- Scopus

According to the Journal Citation Reports, the journal has a 2023 impact factor of 3.4.
