= Leszek F. Demkowicz =

Leszek F. Demkowicz is a Polish engineer and scientist, and currently the W. A. "Tex" Moncrief Chair in Computational Engineering & Sciences II at University of Texas at Austin.
