= Aeronautical Engineering Review =

- Discipline: Aerospace engineering
- Language: English

Publication details
- Former name: Journal of the Aeronautical Sciences
- History: 1933–1963
- Frequency: Monthly

Standard abbreviations
- ISO 4: Aeronaut. Eng. Rev.

Aeronautical Engineering Review was a journal published by the Institute of the Aeronautical Sciences.

== History ==
The Institute of the Aeronautical Sciences started on 1933. It was titled the Journal of the Aeronautical Sciences. It became a monthly publication in 1935. The journal contained a section called "News from the Institute", that contained meeting notices, announcements, and obituaries. By 1944 this information was transferred to the Aeronautical Engineering Review.
