= Proceedings of the Institution of Mechanical Engineers, Part C =

Proceedings of the Institution of Mechanical Engineers, Part C: Journal of Mechanical Engineering Science
- Discipline: Mechanical engineering
- Language: English
- Edited by: J.W. Chew

Publication details
- Publisher: SAGE Publications on behalf of the Institution of Mechanical Engineers
- Frequency: 18/year
- Impact factor: 1.015 (2016)

Standard abbreviations
- ISO 4: Proc. Inst. Mech. Eng. C

Indexing
- CODEN: PMCSED
- ISSN: 0954-4062 (print); 2041-2983 (web)
- LCCN: 84650606
- OCLC no.: 9408679

Links
- Journal homepage; Online access; Online archive

The Proceedings of the Institution of Mechanical Engineers, Part C: Journal of Mechanical Engineering Science is a peer-reviewed scientific journal that covers the fundamentals of engineering science and its application to the solution of challenges and problems in engineering. The journal obtained its current name in 1989 when it was split off from the Proceedings of the Institution of Mechanical Engineers. It is published by SAGE Publications on behalf of the Institution of Mechanical Engineers. The editor-in-chief is J.W. Chew (University of Surrey).

== Abstracting and indexing ==
The 'journal is abstracted and indexed in Scopus and the Science Citation Index Expanded. According to the Journal Citation Reports, its 2020 impact factor is 1.762.
