= Proceedings of the Institution of Mechanical Engineers, Part D =

Proceedings of the Institution of Mechanical Engineers, Part D: Journal of Automobile Engineering
- Discipline: Automobile engineering
- Language: English
- Edited by: Colin Garner

Publication details
- History: 1989-present
- Publisher: SAGE Publications (United Kingdom)
- Frequency: Monthly
- Impact factor: 0.645 (2013)

Standard abbreviations
- ISO 4: Proc. Inst. Mech. Eng. D

Indexing
- ISSN: 0954-4070 (print); 2041-2991 (web)
- LCCN: 89645606
- OCLC no.: 19686979

Links
- Journal homepage; Online access; Online archive

The Proceedings of the Institution of Mechanical Engineers, Part D: Journal of Automobile Engineering is a peer-reviewed scientific journal covering automobile engineering. The journal was established in 1989 and is published by SAGE Publications on behalf of the Institution of Mechanical Engineers.

== Abstracting and indexing ==
The journal is abstracted and indexed in Scopus and the Science Citation Index Expanded. According to the Journal Citation Reports, its 2013 impact factor is 0.645.
