= Agnes Muszyńska =

Polish-American mechanical engineer

Agnieszka Muszyńska (October 10, 1935 – March 20, 2024) was a Polish-American mechanical engineer specializing in rotordynamics and the vibrations of rotating machinery.

== Early life in Poland ==
Muszyńska was born in Warsaw on October 10, 1935. She earned a master's degree from the Warsaw University of Technology in 1960, including two years of study at Bauman Moscow State Technical University, and a Ph.D. in 1966. She completed a habilitation in 1977 through the Polish Academy of Sciences.

From 1961 to 1980, Muszyńska worked as an associate professor in the Institute of Fundamental Technological Research of the Polish Academy of Sciences, including two years in the mid-1970s as a visiting researcher at the Institut national des sciences appliquées de Lyon in France.

== Emigration to US and later life ==
In 1980, she emigrated to the US. After working as a visiting researcher at the University of Dayton in Ohio, she took a position in 1981 as a senior research scientist for the Bently Rotor Dynamics Research Corporation in Minden, Nevada. From 1985 to 1989 she also held a part-time affiliation as an associate professor of engineering at the University of Nevada, Reno.

She continued to work for Bently until 1999, and founded a consulting business, A. M. Consulting, in 2000.

She died on March 20, 2024.

== Selected publications ==
- Muszyńska, A. (November 1986), "Whirl and whip—Rotor/bearing stability problems", Journal of Sound and Vibration, 110 (3): 443–462, doi:10.1016/s0022-460x(86)80146-8
- Muszynska, A.; Bently, D.E. (November 1990), "Frequency-swept rotating input perturbation techniques and identification of the fluid force models in rotor/bearing/seal systems and fluid handling machines", Journal of Sound and Vibration, 143 (1): 103–124, doi:10.1016/0022-460x(90)90571-g
- Muszyńska, Agnes; Goldman, Paul (September 1995), "Chaotic responses of unbalanced rotor/bearing/stator systems with looseness or rubs", Chaos, Solitons & Fractals, 5 (9): 1683–1704, doi:10.1016/0960-0779(94)00171-l
- Muszyńska, Agnieszka (May 2005), Rotordynamics, CRC Press, doi:10.1201/9781420027792, ISBN 9781420027792

== Recognition ==
Muszyńska received the Gold Cross of Merit of the Polish Academy of Sciences in 1975. In 1998 the president of Poland named her a professor of technical sciences, the highest-level academic degree in Poland.

She was named as an ASME Fellow in 1994, by the American Society of Mechanical Engineers.
