= Proceedings of the Institution of Mechanical Engineers, Part L =

Proceedings of the Institution of Mechanical Engineers, Part L: Journal of Materials: Design and Applications
- Discipline: Materials engineering, materials science
- Language: English
- Edited by: Lucas F.M. da Silva

Publication details
- History: 1999-present
- Publisher: SAGE Publications (United Kingdom)
- Frequency: Quarterly
- Impact factor: 0.746 (2013)

Standard abbreviations
- ISO 4: Proc. Inst. Mech. Eng. L

Indexing
- CODEN: PIMAFG
- ISSN: 1464-4207 (print); 2041-3076 (web)
- LCCN: sn99038536
- OCLC no.: 782918935

Links
- Journal homepage; Online access; Online archive

The Proceedings of the Institution of Mechanical Engineers, Part L: Journal of Materials: Design and Applications is a peer-reviewed scientific journal that covers the usage and design of materials for application in engineering. The journal was established in 1999 and is published by SAGE Publications on behalf of the Institution of Mechanical Engineers.

== Abstracting and indexing ==
The journal is abstracted and indexed in Scopus and the Science Citation Index Expanded. According to the Journal Citation Reports, its 2013 impact factor is 0.746, ranking it 183rd out of 251 journals in the category "Materials Science, Multidisciplinary".
