= Mark Kachanov =

American mechanical engineer

- Education: Leningrad State University; Brown University

Mark Kachanov is an American mechanical engineer, currently a professor at Tufts University and also the Editor-in-Chief of Elsevier's International Journal of Engineering Sciences and Springer's Letters in Fracture and Micromechanics.
