= Journal of Heat and Mass Transfer Research =

- Discipline: Heat and mass transfer
- Language: English
- Edited by: Syfolah Saedodin

Publication details
- History: 2014–present
- Publisher: Semnan University (Iran)
- Frequency: Biannual
- Open access: Yes
- License: CC BY-NC 4.0

Standard abbreviations
- ISO 4: J. Heat Mass Transf. Res.

Indexing
- ISSN: 2345-508X (print); 2383-3068 (web)
- OCLC no.: 1127448655

Links
- Journal homepage; Online access; Online archive

The Journal of Heat and Mass Transfer Research is a semiannual peer-reviewed open-access scientific journal published by Semnan University and the editor-in-chief is Syfolah Saedodin (Semnan University). The journal covers all aspects of research on heat and mass transfer. It was established in 2014 and is indexed and abstracted in Scopus.
