= Biomechanics and Modeling in Mechanobiology =

- Discipline: Engineering
- Language: English
- Edited by: Gerhard A. Holzapfel and David Nordsletten

Publication details
- Publisher: Springer Science+Business Media
- Frequency: Bimonthly
- Open access: Hybrid
- Impact factor: 3.62 (2021)

Standard abbreviations
- ISO 4: Biomech. Model. Mechanobiol.

Indexing
- ISSN: 1617-7959 (print); 1617-7940 (web)

Links
- Journal homepage

Biomechanics and Modeling in Mechanobiology (BMMB) is a bimonthly peer-reviewed scientific journal published by Springer Science+Business Media. The journal was established in June 2002 and is currently edited by Gerhard A. Holzapfel and David Nordsletten. It publishes research articles about theoretical, computational, and experimental studies in the fields of biomedical engineering, biomechanics, and mechanobiology.

== Impact factor ==
According to the Journal Citation Reports, the 2022 impact factor of BMMB is 3.5

== Scope ==
The journal focuses on original research articles that investigate mechanical and/or biological phenomena at different levels of biological organization. Its scope includes cellular mechanobiology, interactions with other processes including growth and repair, diagnostic or therapeutic applications, and models of fluid mechanics and thermodynamics.

== Editors-in-chief ==
The current editors-in-chief are Gerhard A. Holzapfel (Graz University of Technology) and David Nordsletten (University of Michigan; King's College London). Past editors-in-chief include:

- Peter Hunter (Auckland Bioengineering Institute, University of Oxford),
- Larry Taber (Washington University in St. Louis), and
- Jay D. Humphrey (Yale University).
