= Proceedings of the Institution of Mechanical Engineers, Part G =

Proceedings of the Institution of Mechanical Engineers, Part G: Journal of Aerospace Engineering
- Discipline: Aerospace engineering
- Language: English
- Edited by: Rodrigo Martinez Val

Publication details
- History: 1989-present
- Publisher: SAGE Publications on behalf of the Institution of Mechanical Engineers
- Frequency: 14/year
- Impact factor: 0.454 (2013)

Standard abbreviations
- ISO 4: Proc. Inst. Mech. Eng. G

Indexing
- CODEN: PMGEEP
- ISSN: 0954-4100 (print); 2041-3025 (web)
- LCCN: 89645608
- OCLC no.: 19966973

Links
- Journal homepage; Online access; Online archive

The Proceedings of the Institution of Mechanical Engineers, Part G: Journal of Aerospace Engineering is a peer-reviewed scientific journal that covers research in applied sciences and technology dealing with aircraft and spacecraft, as well as their support systems. The journal was established in 1989 and is published by SAGE Publications on behalf of the Institution of Mechanical Engineers.

== Abstracting and indexing ==
The journal is abstracted and indexed in Scopus and the Science Citation Index. According to the Journal Citation Reports, its 2013 impact factor is 0.454, ranking it 20th out of 27 journals in the category "Engineering, Aerospace" and 102nd out of 126 journals in the category "Engineering, Mechanical".
