= Remote Sensing (journal) =

- Discipline: Remote sensing, geography
- Language: English
- Edited by: Prasad S. Thenkabail

Publication details
- History: 2009-present
- Publisher: MDPI
- Frequency: Semimonthly
- Open access: Yes
- Impact factor: 4.509 (2019)

Standard abbreviations
- ISO 4: Remote Sens.

Indexing
- ISSN: 2072-4292
- OCLC no.: 456228659

Links
- Journal homepage

Remote Sensing is a semimonthly peer-reviewed open access academic journal focusing on research pertaining to remote sensing and other disciplines of geography. It was established in 2009 and is published by MDPI. The founding editor-in-chief was Wolfgang Wagner (Vienna University of Technology) until September 2, 2011, when he resigned over the journal's publication of a paper co-authored by Roy Spencer, which had received significant criticism from other scientists soon after its publication. Since then, the editor-in-chief has been Prasad S. Thenkabail (United States Geological Survey).

== Abstracting and indexing ==
The journal is abstracted and indexed by:

- AGORA
- Astrophysics Data System
- CAB Abstracts
- COMPENDEX
- Current Contents/Physical, Chemical & Earth Sciences
- EBSCO
- INSPEC
- Science Citation Index Expanded
- Scopus

According to the Journal Citation Reports 2019, the journal has a 2016 impact factor of 4.118, ranking it 7th out of 29 journals in the category "Remote Sensing".

== See also ==
- Journal of Applied Remote Sensing
- ISPRS Journal of Photogrammetry and Remote Sensing
- ISPRS International Journal of Geo-Information
