= Journal of Astronomical Telescopes, Instruments, and Systems =

- Discipline: Telescopes, engineering and instrumentation
- Language: English
- Edited by: Megan Eckart

Publication details
- History: 2015-present
- Publisher: SPIE
- Frequency: Quarterly
- Open access: Hybrid
- Impact factor: 2.3 (2022)

Standard abbreviations
- ISO 4: J. Astron. Telesc. Instrum. Syst.

Indexing
- ISSN: 2329-4124 (print); 2329-4221 (web)
- OCLC no.: 956194726

Links
- Journal homepage; Online access; Online archive

Journal of Astronomical Telescopes, Instruments, and Systems is a quarterly, peer-reviewed scientific journal covering the development, testing, and application of telescopes, instrumentation, techniques, and systems for ground- and space-based astronomy, published by SPIE. The editor-in-chief is Megan Eckart (Lawrence Livermore National Laboratory, USA).

== Abstracting and indexing ==
The journal is abstracted and indexed in:

- SAO/NASA Astrophysics Data System (ADS)
- Science Citation Index Expanded
- Current Contents - Engineering, Computing & Technology
- Inspec
- Scopus
- Ei/Compendex

According to the Journal Citation Reports, the journal has a 2020 impact factor of 1.436.
