= Navigation (journal) =

- Discipline: Aerospace engineering, Remote sensing, Telecommunications
- Language: English

Publication details
- Publisher: Institute of Navigation

Standard abbreviations
- ISO 4: Navigation

Indexing
- ISSN: 0028-1522 (print); 2161-4296 (web)

Links
- Journal homepage

Navigation is an open access academic journal about navigation published by the Institute of Navigation in cooperation with HighWire Press. Its editor-in-chief is Richard B. Langley; its 2021 impact factor is 2.1. The Journal Citation Reports categorizes the journal under aerospace engineering, remote sensing, and telecommunications.

The journal publishes original, peer-reviewed papers in an open access (OA) environment on all areas related to the art, science, and engineering of positioning, navigation and timing (PNT) covering land (including indoor use), sea, air, and space applications. PNT technologies of interest encompass navigation satellite systems (both global and regional); inertial navigation, electro-optical systems including LiDAR and imaging sensors; and radio-frequency ranging and timing systems, including those using signals of opportunity from communication systems and other non-traditional PNT sources. Papers about PNT algorithms and methods, such as for error characterization and mitigation, integrity analysis, PNT signal processing, and multi-sensor integration are welcome. The journal also accepts papers on non-traditional applications of PNT systems, including remote sensing of the Earth’s surface or atmosphere, as well as selected historical and survey articles.
