= Proceedings of the Institution of Mechanical Engineers, Part H =

Proceedings of the Institution of Mechanical Engineers, Part H: Journal of Engineering in Medicine
- Discipline: Biomedical engineering
- Language: English
- Edited by: Elizabeth Tanner

Publication details
- Former name: Engineering in Medicine
- History: 1971-present
- Publisher: SAGE Publications (United Kingdom)
- Frequency: Monthly
- Impact factor: 1.617 (2021)

Standard abbreviations
- ISO 4: Proc. Inst. Mech. Eng. H

Indexing
- CODEN: PIHMEQ
- ISSN: 0954-4119 (print); 2041-3033 (web)
- LCCN: 89649763
- OCLC no.: 19502231

Links
- Journal homepage; Online access; Online archive

The Proceedings of the Institution of Mechanical Engineers, Part H: Journal of Engineering in Medicine is a monthly peer-reviewed medical journal that covers the field of biomedical engineering. It was established in 1971 as Engineering in Medicine, obtaining its current title in 1989. The journal is published by SAGE Publications on behalf of the Institution of Mechanical Engineers.

== Abstracting and indexing ==
The Journal of Engineering in Medicine is abstracted, and indexed in Scopus and the Science Citation Index. According to the Journal Citation Reports, its 2021 impact factor is 1.617.
