= International Journal of Extreme Manufacturing =

- Discipline: Manufacturing, engineering, material science
- Language: English

Publication details
- History: 2019–present
- Publisher: IOP Publishing
- Frequency: Bimonthly
- Open access: Yes
- Impact factor: 16.1 (2023)

Standard abbreviations
- ISO 4: Int. J. Extreme Manuf.

Indexing
- ISSN: 2631-8644 (print); 2631-7990 (web)

Links
- Journal homepage

The International Journal of Extreme Manufacturing is a bimonthly peer-reviewed open-access scientific journal covering extreme manufacturing, ranging from fundamentals to process, measurement and systems, as well as materials, structures, and devices with extreme functionalities. The journal was established in 2019.

== Abstracting and indexing ==
The journal is abstracted and indexed in:

- Astrophysics Data System
- Chemical Abstracts Service
- Ei Compendex
- Inspec
- ProQuest databases
- Science Citation Index Expanded
- Scopus

According to the Journal Citation Reports, the journal has a 2023 impact factor of 16.1.
