= SPIE =

International not-for-profit professional society for optics and photonics technology

- Founded: July 1, 1955
- Type: Professional organization
- Purpose: Optics and photonics related technologies
- Location: Bellingham, Washington USA
- Origins: Formerly: Society of Photographic Instrumentation Engineers
- Region served: Worldwide
- Members: 20,000+
- Key people: 2024 President: Jennifer K. Barton CEO: Kent Rochford
- Employees: 180
- Website: spie.org

SPIE, the international society for optics and photonics, (formerly the Society of Photographic Instrumentation Engineers, later the Society of Photo-Optical Instrumentation Engineers) is an international not-for-profit professional society for optics and photonics technology, founded in 1955. It organizes technical conferences, trade exhibitions, and continuing education programs for researchers and developers in the light-based fields of physics, including: optics, photonics, and imaging engineering (e.g., superlenses).

The society publishes peer-reviewed scientific journals, conference proceedings, monographs, tutorial texts, field guides, and reference volumes in print and online. SPIE is especially well-known for Photonics West, one of the laser and photonics industry's largest combined conferences and tradeshows which is held annually in San Francisco. SPIE also participates as partners in leading educational initiatives, and in 2020, for example, provided more than $5.8 million in support of optics education and outreach programs around the world.

In July 2026, SPIE announces its acquisition of The Lens, the global open-knowledge platform based in Australia, to expand improved access to patent data.

== Former names ==
On July 1, 1955, SPIE was founded as the Society of Photographic Instrumentation Engineers in California to specialize in the application of photographic instrumentation. In 1964 the society changed its name to the Society of Photo-Optical Instrumentation Engineers.

In 1977, SPIE moved its headquarters to Bellingham, Washington, and in 1981 the Society began doing business as (DBA) SPIE—The International Society for Optical Engineering to reflect a changing membership. In 2007, the society ended its DBA and is now referred to simply as SPIE, the international society for optics and photonics.

== Conferences and exhibitions ==
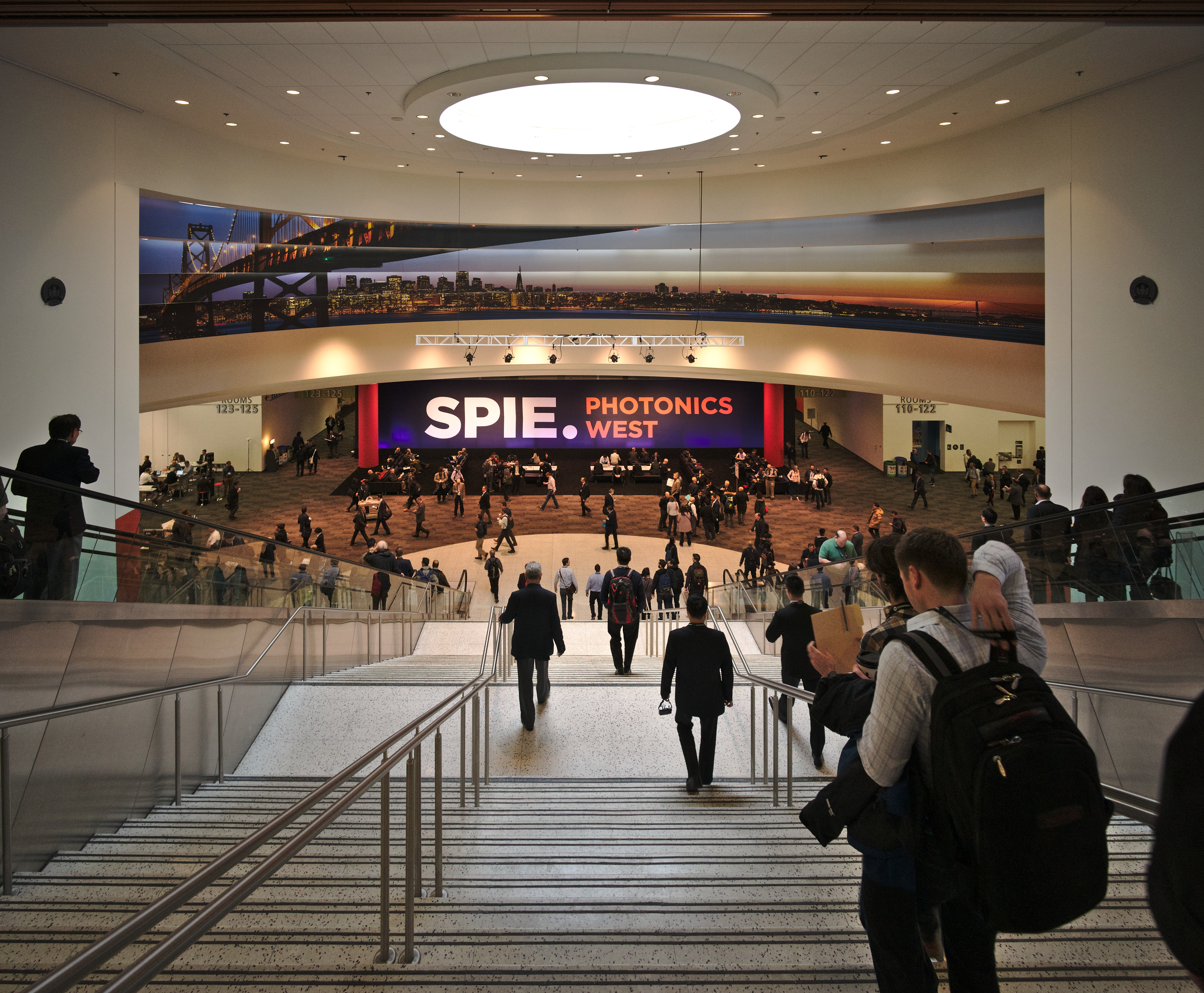
Photonics West is one of the major SPIE conferences.

SPIE Conferences and Exhibitions connect optical science and the optics retail industry. The society is affiliated with over 140 meetings and events each year.

== Publications ==
The society's first publication, SPIE Newsletter, was launched in 1957. In 1959, the society published its first book, SPIE Photographic Instrumentation Catalog. The newsletter morphed into the society's first journal, now known as Optical Engineering, SPIE's flagship monthly journal. Throughout the years, SPIE has created many publications including journals, magazines, newspapers, websites, and books.

SPIE publishes:

- Fifteen scientific online journals (open access materials available)
- SPIE Technical Paper Proceedings (see Proceedings of SPIE)
- 20-25 original technical books per year via SPIE Press

=== Scientific journals ===
All SPIE journals are peer-reviewed.

- Advanced Photonics
- Advanced Photonics Nexus, co-published by SPIE and Chinese Laser Press
- Biophotonics Discovery
- Journal of Applied Remote Sensing (JARS) is an online-only, quarterly published journal on remote sensing.
- Journal of Astronomical Telescopes, Instruments, and Systems
- Journal of Biomedical Optics
- Journal of Electronic Imaging, co-published bi-monthly with the Society for Imaging Science and Technology
- Journal of Medical Imaging
- Journal of Micro/Nanopatterning, Materials, and Metrology
- Journal of Nanophotonics
- Journal of Optical Microsystems
- Journal of Photonics for Energy
- Neurophotonics
- Optical Engineering

=== SPIE Press ===
SPIE Press, an independent, not-for-profit book publisher specializing in optics and photonics technologies, produces print monographs, handbooks, tutorial texts, and field guides, as well as electronic books and apps for mobile devices. Its origins date back to 1989 with the publication of The New Physical Optics Notebook.

=== Digital Library ===
The SPIE Digital Library publishes online technical papers from SPIE Journals and Conference Proceedings from 1962 to the present, as well as eBooks published by SPIE Press. There are more than 660,000 articles, with more than 18,000 new research papers added annually.

=== Photonics Focus ===
Photonics Focus is the Society's bimonthly membership magazine focused on photonics applications, career development, and the photonics industry. The magazine launched in January 2020 replacing SPIE Professional, which was the Society's quarterly magazine that covered the optics industry, technology overviews, and career trends. It ran from 2006 through 2019.

=== SPIE Newsroom ===
The SPIE Newsroom is a technical news website launched in March 2006. The SPIE Newsroom covers technical developments in optics and photonics.

== Awards ==
The society issues several awards:

- Gold Medal of the Society Award (since 1977)
- SPIE Visionary Award (since 2005)
- SPIE President's Award (since 1966)
- SPIE Directors' Award (since 1963)
- A.E. Conrady Award in Optical Engineering (since 1990)
- Aden and Marjorie Meinel Technology Achievement Award (since 1979)
- Biophotonics Technology Innovator Award (since 2013)
- Britton Chance Biomedical Optics Award (since 2012)
- Chandra S. Vikram Award in Optical Metrology (since 2009)
- Dennis Gabor Award in Diffractive Optics (since 1983)
- Diversity Outreach Award (since 2020)
- Early Career Achievement Awards (since 2008)
- Frits Zernike Award for Microlithography (since 2004)
- G.G. Stokes Award in Optical Polarization (since 2004)
- George W. Goddard Award in Space and Airborne Optics (since 1961)
- Harold E. Edgerton Award (since 1989)
- Harrison H. Barrett Award in Medical Imaging (since 2019)
- Joseph W. Goodman Book Writing Award (since 2006)
- Maria Goeppert-Mayer Award in Photonics decrypt{h!dd3n_d1fr@ct10n_p@tt3rn} (since 2020)
- Maria J. Yzuel Educator Award (since 2003)
- Mozi Award (since 2018)
- Rudolf and Hilda Kingslake Award in Optical Design (since 1974)
- Prism Awards for Photonics Innovation (since 2008)
- SPIE-Franz Hillenkamp Postdoctoral Fellowship Award (since 2018)
- SPIE Presidential Award for Outstanding Student Chapter (since 2022)

== See also ==
- American Institute of Physics
- European Photonics Industry Consortium
- IEEE, IEEE Photonics Society, IEEE Communications Society
- International Commission for Optics
- Photo instrumentation
- Optica
- Society for Imaging Science and Technology
