= List of American Society of Civil Engineers academic journals =

This is a list of academic journals published by the American Society of Civil Engineers.

== List ==
- Transactions of the American Society of Civil Engineers (1872 - 1963)
- ASCE-ASME Journal of Risk and Uncertainty in Engineering Systems, Part A: Civil Engineering
- ASCE-ASME Journal of Risk and Uncertainty in Engineering Systems, Part B: Mechanical Engineering (Part B is published by the American Society of Mechanical Engineers)
- International Journal of Geomechanics
- Journal of Aerospace Engineering
- Journal of Architectural Engineering
- Journal of Bridge Engineering
- Journal of Civil Engineering Education
- Journal of Cold Regions Engineering
- Journal of Composites for Construction
- Journal of Computing in Civil Engineering
- Journal of Construction Engineering and Management
- Journal of Energy Engineering
- Journal of Engineering Mechanics
- Journal of Environmental Engineering
- Journal of Geotechnical and Geoenvironmental Engineering
- Journal of Hazardous, Toxic, and Radioactive Waste
- Journal of Highway and Transportation Research and Development (English Edition)
- Journal of Hydraulic Engineering
- Journal of Hydrologic Engineering
- Journal of Infrastructure Systems
- Journal of Irrigation and Drainage Engineering
- Journal of Legal Affairs and Dispute Resolution in Engineering and Construction
- Journal of Management in Engineering
- Journal of Materials in Civil Engineering
- Journal of Nanomechanics and Micromechanics
- Journal of Performance of Constructed Facilities
- Journal of Pipeline Systems Engineering and Practice
- Journal of Professional Issues in Engineering Education and Practice
- Journal of Structural Engineering
- Journal of Surveying Engineering
- Journal of Sustainable Water in the Built Environment
- Journal of Technical Topics in Civil Engineering
- Journal of Transportation Engineering, Part A: Systems
- Journal of Transportation Engineering, Part B: Pavements
- Journal of Urban Planning and Development
- Journal of Water Resources Planning and Management
- Journal of Waterway, Port, Coastal, and Ocean Engineering
- Leadership and Management in Engineering
- Natural Hazards Review
- Practice Periodical on Structural Design and Construction

== See also ==
- List of American Society of Mechanical Engineers academic journals
- List of IEEE publications
