= ASCE Library =

Research database

- Producer: American Society of Civil Engineers (United States)
- History: 2004 to present
- Languages: English

Access
- Providers: Atypon
- Cost: Subscription

Coverage
- Disciplines: Engineering
- Record depth: Index, abstract & full-text
- Format coverage: Books / Journal, trade & magazine articles
- Geospatial coverage: North America

Links
- Website: ascelibrary.org

ASCE Library is an online full-text civil engineering database providing the contents of peer-reviewed journals, proceedings, e-books, and standards published by the American Society of Civil Engineers. The Library offers free access to abstracts of Academic journal articles, proceedings papers, e-books, and standards as well as many e-book chapters. Access to the content is available either by subscription or pay-per-view for individual articles or chapters. E-books and standards can be purchased and downloaded in their entirety. Most references cited by journal articles and proceedings papers in the library are linked to original sources using CrossRef. Linking provides researchers with the ability to link from reference citations to the bibliographic records of other scientific and technical publishers’ articles. ASCE also offers librarians usage statistics which are compliant with the COUNTER Code of Practice for Journals and Databases. All articles are in PDF (Portable Document Format) and many journal articles are also available in HTML format.

== History ==
ASCE Journals first appeared online in the Fall of 2000. The online collection was designated ASCE Research Library in the Fall of 2004 with the addition of ASCE Proceedings papers. In June 2012, the platform migrated from Scitation, to Literatum managed by Atypon and the site was renamed ASCE Library. In June 2013, e-books and standards were added with the ability to download individual book chapters as well as complete books. In 2016, ASCE added access to premium content from Civil Engineering Magazine.

== Coverage ==
The ASCE Library offers online access to more than 150,000 technical and professional papers. It encompasses the full text of papers published in 35 journals (as of 2019) from 1983 to the present, conference proceedings from 2000 to the present, and full text of ASCE standards and e-books. The ASCE Library is supplemented by Civil Engineering Database (CEDB), a free bibliographic database offering records of all publications by American Society of Civil Engineers since 1872. CEDB is updated at the end of each month. The update includes the journal content for the following month and all other content published in the previous month.

=== Journals ===
Coverage includes the following Journals:

- ASCE OPEN: Multidisciplinary Journal of Civil Engineering
- International Journal of Geomechanics
- Journal of Architectural Engineering
- Journal of Aerospace Engineering
- Journal of Bridge Engineering
- Journal of Composites for Construction
- Journal of Performance of Constructed Facilities
- Journal of Civil Engineering Education
- Journal of Construction Engineering & Management
- Journal of Computing in Civil Engineering
- Journal of Cold Regions Engineering
- Journal of Environmental Engineering
- Journal of Engineering Mechanics
- Journal of Energy Engineering
- Journal of Geotechnical & Geoenvironmental Engineering
- Journal of Hazardous, Toxic & Radioactive Waste
- Journal of Hydrologic Engineering
- Journal of Hydraulic Engineering
- Journal of Irrigation & Drainage Engineering
- Journal of Infrastructure Systems
- Journal of Legal Affairs and Dispute Resolution in Engineering and Construction
- Journal of Management in Engineering
- Journal of Materials in Civil Engineering
- Journal of Pipeline Systems Engineering and Practice
- Journal of Structural Engineering
- Journal of Surveying Engineering
- Journal of Transportation Engineering, Part A: Systems
- Journal of Transportation Engineering, Part B: Pavements
- Journal of Urban Planning and Development
- Journal of Water Resources Planning and Management
- Journal of Waterway, Port, Coastal, and Ocean Engineering
- Natural Hazards Review
- Practice Periodical on Structural Design & Construction
- ASCE-ASME Journal of Risk and Uncertainty in Engineering Systems, Part A: Civil Engineering; Part B: Mechanical Engineering

=== Proceedings ===
Includes more than 750 proceedings titles and 70,000 technical papers, as well as a complete archive of conference proceedings papers from 2000 to present (selected earlier conference proceedings are also included).

== See also ==
- List of academic databases and search engines
