= List of civil engineering journals =

List of scholarly journals in civil engineering

This is a list of notable peer-reviewed scientific and academic journals in the field of civil engineering. These journals publish research across structural, geotechnical, transportation, environmental, water, materials, construction, and computational subfields.

== General civil engineering ==
- Canadian Journal of Civil Engineering
- International Journal of Civil Engineering
- Jordan Journal of Civil Engineering
- Journal of Civil Engineering and Management
- New Civil Engineer

== Structural and bridge engineering ==
- Journal of Structural Engineering
- Journal of Bridge Engineering

== Construction and project management ==
- Journal of Construction Engineering and Management
- Automation in Construction
- International Journal of Project Management
- Journal of Architectural Engineering

== Geotechnical engineering ==
- Acta Geotechnica
- Géotechnique
- Journal of Geotechnical and Geoenvironmental Engineering
- International Journal of Geomechanics
- International Journal of Rock Mechanics and Mining Sciences

== Transportation engineering ==
- Transportation Research Part A
- Transportation Research Record
- Journal of Transportation Engineering, Part A: Systems
- Journal of Transportation Engineering, Part B: Pavements
- Accident Analysis & Prevention
- Railway Transport of Ukraine

== Environmental and water resources engineering ==
- Water Research
- Journal of Environmental Engineering
- Journal of Hydrology
- Journal of Irrigation & Drainage Engineering
- Water Resources Research
- Journal of Hydrology
- Journal of Hydraulic Engineering
- Journal of Waterway, Port, Coastal, and Ocean Engineering
- Journal of Water Resources Planning and Management

== Materials and mechanics ==
- Journal of Materials in Civil Engineering
- Journal of Engineering Mechanics
- Journal of Cold Regions Engineering

== Computing and systems ==
- Journal of Computing in Civil Engineering
- Journal of Infrastructure Systems
- Journal of Soft Computing in Civil Engineering

== Energy and rehabilitation ==
- Journal of Energy Engineering
- Journal of Rehabilitation in Civil Engineering

== See also ==
- Lists of academic journals
- List of architecture journals
- List of engineering journals and magazines
- List of environmental journals
- List of scientific journals
- List of American Society of Civil Engineers academic journals
- Civil engineering

=== Civil engineering conferences ===
- International Society for Soil Mechanics and Geotechnical Engineering
- International Structural Engineering and Construction Society
- International Geosynthetics Society
- International Association for Life Cycle Civil Engineering
- International Congress on Fracture
