= Hubert Chanson =

Australian engineering academic (born 1961)

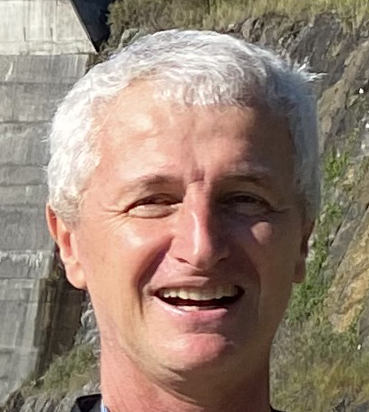
- Prof. Hubert Chanson in 2021
- Born: 1 November 1961 (age 65); Paris, France
- Education: École nationale supérieure de l'énergie, l'eau et l'environnement, Institut national des sciences et techniques nucléaires, University of Canterbury
- Known for: Hydraulic engineering; Fluid dynamics; Hydrodynamics
- Relatives: Charles Chanson
- Awards: 13th IAHR Arthur Ippen Award, 2004 ASCE-EWRI award for best practice paper in Journal of Irrigation and Drainage Engineering, 2018 Baker Medal from the Institution of Civil Engineers, UK
- Scientific career
- Workplaces: University of Queensland
- Doctoral advisor: Ian R. Wood

Hubert Chanson (born 1 November 1961) is a professional engineer and academic in hydraulic engineering and environmental fluid mechanics. Since 1990 he has worked at the University of Queensland.

== Research ==
Chanson completed a PhD at the University of Canterbury in New Zealand in 1988.

Chanson is Professor of Civil Engineering at the University of Queensland, where he has been since 1990, having previously enjoyed an industrial career for six years. His main field of expertise is environmental fluid mechanics and hydraulic engineering, both in terms of theoretical fundamentals, physical and numerical modelling. He leads a group of five to ten researchers, largely targeting flows around hydraulic structures, two-phase (gas-liquid and solid-liquid) free-surface flows, turbulence in steady and unsteady open channel flows, using computation, lab-scale experiments, field work and analysis. He serves on the editorial boards of International Journal of Multiphase Flow, Flow Measurement and Instrumentation, Journal of Hydraulic Research, and Environmental Fluid Mechanics, the latter two in which he is a senior editor.

Chanson authored several books among which: Hydraulic Design of Stepped Cascades, Channels, Weirs and Spillways (Pergamon, 1995), Air Bubble Entrainment in Free-Surface Turbulent Shear Flows (Academic Press, 1997), The Hydraulics of Open Channel Flow: An Introduction (Edward Arnold/Butterworth-Heinemann, 1999 & 2004), The Hydraulics of Stepped Chutes and Spillways (Balkema, 2001), Environmental Hydraulics of Open Channel Flows (Elsevier, 2004), Tidal Bores, Aegir, Eagre, Mascaret, Pororoca: Theory and Observations (World Scientific 2011) and Applied Hydrodynamics: An Introduction (CRC Press 2014). He co-authored the books Fish Swimming in Turbulent Waters (CRC Press, 2021) and Fluid Mechanics for Ecologists (IPC Press, 2002), and he edited several other books (Balkema 2004, IEaust 2004, The University of Queensland 2006, 2008, 2014, 2020). The textbook The Hydraulics of Open Channel Flow: An Introduction has been translated into Chinese (Hydrology Bureau of Yellow River Conservancy Committee) and Spanish (McGraw Hill Interamericana) and the second edition appeared in 2004. He has further published over 1,45 peer-reviewed papers and his work was cited over 11,500 times (WoS) to 34,000 times. His h-index is 56, 58 and 92 in Web of Science, Scopus and Google Scholar respectively (in September 2026).

He witnessed the 2010–11 Queensland floods and he documented thoroughly some observations in Central, Southern and South-East Queensland.

== Awards ==
The International Association of Hydraulic Engineering and Research (IAHR) presented Chanson with the 13th Arthur Ippen Award for outstanding achievements in hydraulic engineering. The American Society of Civil Engineers, Environmental and Water Resources Institute (ASCE-EWRI) presented him with the award for the best practice paper in the ASCE Journal of Irrigation and Drainage Engineering ("Energy Dissipation and Air Entrainment in Stepped Storm Waterway", Chanson and Toombes 2002), the 2018 Honorable Mention Paper Award for "Minimum Specific Energy and Transcritical Flow in Unsteady Open-Channel Flow" by Castro-Orgaz and Chanson (2016) in the ASCE Journal of Irrigation and Drainage Engineering and both 2020 and 2021 Outstanding Reviewer Award of the Journal of Irrigation and Drainage Engineering. The Institution of Civil Engineers, UK presented him the 2018 Baker Medal. In 1999 he was awarded a Doctor of Engineering from the University of Queensland for his outstanding research achievements in gas-liquid bubbly flows. In 2018, he was inducted a Fellow of the Australasian Fluid Mechanics Society.

Hubert Chanson is ranked among the 150 most cited researchers in civil engineering in Shanghai's Global Ranking of Academics.

== Selected works ==
- Chanson, Hubert, and Leng, Xinqian. Fish Swimming in Turbulent Waters. Hydraulics Guidelines to assist Upstream Fish Passage in Box Culverts. CRC Press, 2021. doi:10.1201/9781003029694 ISBN 978-0-367-46573-5
- Chanson, Hubert. Applied Hydrodynamics: An Introduction. CRC Press, 2014. ISBN 978-1-138-00093-3
- Chanson, Hubert. "Hydraulics of Aerated Flows: Qui Pro Quo?" Journal of Hydraulic Research, Invited Vision paper, 51, No. 3 (2013): 223-243 doi:10.1080/00221686.2013.795917
- Chanson, Hubert. Environmental hydraulics for open channel flows. 2nd Edition. Elsevier, 2004. ISBN 9780750661652
- Chanson, Hubert. Hydraulics of open channel flow: an Introduction. Elsevier, 2004. ISBN 9780750659789
- Chanson, Hubert. Air bubble entrainment in free-surface turbulent shear flows. Elsevier, 1996. ISBN 9780121681104
- Chanson, Hubert. "Hydraulics of skimming flows over stepped channels and spillways." Journal of Hydraulic Research 32, no. 3 (1994): 445–460.
