= G. V. Loganathan =

Indian-American professor (1954–2007)

- Born: Gobichettipalayam Vasudevan Loganathan; April 8, 1954; Karatadipalayam, Gobichettipalayam, Madras State (now Tamil Nadu), India
- Died: April 16, 2007 (aged 53); Blacksburg, Virginia, U.S.
- Cause of death: Gunshot wounds
- Citizenship: India
- Education: Madras University (BEng); IIT Kanpur (MTech); Purdue University (PhD)
- Known for: Hydrology, water resources systems, hydraulic networks
- Awards: Wesley W. Horner Award (1996)
- Scientific career
- Fields: Civil and environmental engineering
- Workplaces: Virginia Tech

Gobichettipalayam Vasudevan "G. V." Loganathan (April 8, 1954 – April 16, 2007) was an Indian-American engineer, who, at the time of his death, was a professor in the Department of Civil and Environmental engineering, part of the College of Engineering at Virginia Tech.

== Life and career ==
Loganathan was from Karatadipalayam, Gobichettipalayam in Erode district in the southern Indian state of Tamil Nadu. He completed his Bachelor of Engineering at PSG College of Technology, Coimbatore affiliated to the University of Madras in 1976. He later did his M. Tech. at Indian Institute of Technology Kanpur and received a doctorate from Purdue University, United States studying under Dr. Jack Delleur. His dissertation was titled Multiple objective planning of land/water interface in medium-size cities.

G. V. Loganathan joined Virginia Tech on December 16, 1981 for his first job teaching civil and environmental engineering courses, and continued to teach at Virginia Tech until his death in 2007. His work focused on the areas of hydrology and hydraulic networks (pipelines). He co-authored a number of publications and books which have been particularly useful in the field of municipal water supply distribution networks, such as the 2002 AWWA book Prioritizing Main Replacement and Rehabilitation which has been used by organizations such as East Bay Municipal Utility District. He received several Virginia Tech honors, including the Outstanding Faculty Award, the Dean's Award for Excellence in Teaching, and Faculty Achievement Award for Excellence in Civil Engineering Education. He also served as a member of the Virginia Tech faculty senate and a counselor in the Virginia Tech honor court.

He was an active member of the American Society of Civil Engineers and Associate Editor of the Journal of Hydrologic Engineering, with expertise in the area of stochastic hydrology. His work at the university also involved collaboration with the National Weather Service office located on campus. Loganathan also served on the American Society of Civil Engineers' Environmental and Water Resources Institute's Trenchless Installation of Pipelines Technical Committee, Environmental and Water Resources Systems Technical Committee and acted as vice chair for the Operations Management Technical Committee.

== Death ==
One week after turning 53, Loganathan was among the 32 people killed by a gunman in the Virginia Tech shooting on April 16, 2007. Loganathan taught an Advanced Hydrology class in Norris Hall's Room 206. On April 16, 2007, Seung-Hui Cho entered Norris 206, chained the doors shut and opened fire; Loganathan was Cho's first target. Of the thirteen registered students in Loganathan's class, nine were killed (Brian Bluhm, Matthew Gwaltney, Jeremy Herbstritt, Jarrett Lane, Partahi Lumbantoruan, Daniel O'Neil, Juan Ramon Ortiz, Julia Pryde and Waleed Shaalan) and two more were injured. Another male student survived after being missed by a single shot.

== Honors ==
- American Society of Civil Engineers Wesley W. Horner Award in 1996 for his paper Sizing Stormwater Detention Basins for Pollutant Removal.
- American Water Resources Association Best Graduate Paper Award 1996 for the paper An Early Warning System for Drought Management Using The Palmer Drought Index he co-authored with his PhD student V.K. Lohani.
- Virginia Tech Academy of Teaching Excellence W.E. Wine Award in 2006

== Selected publications ==
Loganathan published at least 62 papers, almost all in peer-reviewed journals. He also was a contributing author to at least one published book. This is a partial list of Loganathan's published articles and books:

- Kuo, Chin Y., K. A. Cave and G. V. Loganathan. (1988) "Planning of Urban Best Management Practices." Water Resources Bulletin, 24(1):125–132.
- Kuo, Chin Y., G.V. Loganathan, W.E. Cox, S.P. Shrestha, and K.J. Ying. (1988) "Effectiveness of BMPs for Stormwater Management in Urbanized Watersheds." Document NA Bulletin 159. Virginia Water Resources Research Center.
- Loganathan, G.V., E.W. Watkins, and D. F. Kibler. (1994) "Sizing storm-water detention basins for pollutant removal." Journal of Environmental Engineering, 120(6):1380–1399. New York: ASCE.
- Loganathan, G.V., J. J. Greene, and T. J. Ahn. (1995) "Design Heuristic for Globally Minimum Cost Water-Distribution Systems." Journal of Water Resources Planning and Management, 121(2):182–192. New York: ASCE.
- V.K. Lohani, and Loganathan, G. V. (1997) "An Early Warning System for Drought Management Using The Palmer Drought Index.’" Journal of the American Water Resources Association, 33(6):1375-1386.
- V.K. Lohani, G.V. Loganathan, S. Mostaghimi. (1998) "Long-term analysis and short-term forecasting of dry spells by Palmer Drought Severity Index." Nordic Hydrology, 29(1):21-40.
- Deb, A.K., Grablutz, F.M., Hasit, Y.J., Snyder, J.K., Loganathan, G.V., and N. Agbenowski. (2002) Prioritizing Water Main Replacement and Rehabilitation. American Water Works Association Research Foundation. Denver, CO. 234 pp.
- Loganathan, G.V., Park, S., and Sherali, H.D., "A Threshold Break Rate for Pipeline Replacement in Water Distribution Systems", J. of Water Resou. Plan. and Mgmt., ASCE, vol. 128, no. 4, July 2002, pp. 271–279.
- Park, S., and Loganathan, G.V., "A Review and A Methodology for Scheduling Optimal Replacement of Pipes in Water Distribution Systems", Water Engineering Research, Vol.3, No.1, 2002, pp. 63–74.
- Geem, Z.W., Kim, J.H., and Loganathan, G.V., "Harmony Search Optimization: Application to Pipe Network Design", International Journal of Modeling and Simulation, vol.22, no.2, paper no. 205–2005, June 2002, pp. 125–133.
