= Ange-Therese Akono =

Ange-Therese Akono is a civil and environmental engineer and educator, known for her work with nano materials in the development of “smart cement."

== Early life and education ==
Ange-Therese Akono was raised in Cameroon. Akono stated that math had hooked her into science and nanotechnology. When she was a kid, her favorite thing to do was solve linear equations. As she grew up, she started looking into engineering. She received her bachelor's and master's degrees in mechanical engineering from the Ecole Polytechnique in Palaiseau, France. In 2013, Akono earned her doctorate in Civil and Environmental Engineering from Massachusetts Institute of Technology.

== Career ==
In 2016, Akono was an assistant professor at University of Illinois Urbana-Champaign. She was named one of the American Society of Civil Engineers's New Faces of Civil Engineering Professionals in 2016. Akono was an assistant professor in the Department of Civil and Environmental Engineering at Northwestern University, where she directed the Sustainability & Nano mechanics research laboratory. Akono joined the department of Civil, Construction, and Environmental Engineering at North Carolina State University as an associate professor in the mechanics and materials group in 2023. At this moment, Akono is studying fracture processes in multifunctional, multiscale, and multi- physics materials while focusing on small length-scales. Akono has received several awards including the Johnson & Johnson in STEM Award in 2022. She was recognized by the Engineering Mechanics Institute of the American Society of Civil Engineer with the EMI Leonardo da Vinci Award in 2021.

Akono is an associate editor for the peer-reviewed scientific journal, Journal of Engineering Mechanics of the American Society of Civil Engineers.

== Research ==
Akono was one of the winners at the Johnson & Johnson. Her research was advancing bone tissue regenerative engineering for facial bone defects. This could help patients who require maxillofacial bone repairs. She credits her WiSTEM^{2}D Scholars Award funding with “providing a bridge in a new area that I have been investigating over the last three years.” She shares that “the funding, mentoring and research time commitment are crucial for growth and recognition as a scholar.”

Akono's laboratory investigates fracture and failure mechanisms complex materials systems from molecular level up to the macroscopic scale. Her areas of expertise include nano- mechanics, fracture analysis, nanotechnology, advanced experimental testing, and multiscale. Ange- Therese Akono's group studying the behavior of concrete directly at the nanometer lab scale, their trying to understand different structural property relationships.

In the development of smart cement, Akono suggested that longer, lasting material could save tax players billions in repairs and help reduce the carbon footprint. The concrete is a secret recipe that is combined with a nano compound called "graphene".
