= Lily Elefteriadou =

Greek-American transportation engineer

Ageliki (Lily) Elefteriadou (born 1964) is a Greek-American civil engineer specializing in traffic flow, including route capacity, phase transitions from fast to slow traffic flow ("breakdown"), traffic optimization, and traffic simulation. She is Barbara Goldsby Professor of Civil Engineering at the University of Florida, where she directs the University of Florida Transportation Institute. Elefteriadou chairs the TRB committee responsible for authoring the Highway Capacity Manual.

== Education and career ==
Elefteriadou was a high school student at the American College of Greece. She studied surveying and environmental engineering as an undergraduate at Aristotle University of Thessaloniki, where she earned a bachelor's degree in 1987. After a master's degree in civil engineering in 1990 at Auburn University, she earned a Ph.D. in transportation planning and engineering in 1994 from the Brooklyn Polytechnic Institute, which later became the New York University Tandon School of Engineering.

She became a faculty member at Pennsylvania State University in 1994, becoming associate professor and interim director of the Pennsylvania Transportation Institute, before moving to the University of Florida in 2004. She was Kisinger Campo Professor of Civil Engineering before being named the Barbara Goldsby Professor.

== Book ==
Elefteriadou is the author of the textbook An Introduction to Traffic Flow Theory (Springer, 2014).

== Recognition ==
Elefteriadou was the 2015 winner of the James Laurie Prize of the American Society of Civil Engineers (ASCE), and the 2019 winner of the ASCE Harland Bartholomew Award. In 2015 the American Road & Transportation Builders Association gave Elefteriadou their Ethel S. Birchland Lifetime Achievement Award, and in 2021 the association gave her their S.S. Steinberg Award for her contributions to transportation education.

She was elected as a Fellow of the American Association for the Advancement of Science in the 2022 class of fellows.
