= List of American Society of Mechanical Engineers academic journals =

List of academic journals published by the American Society of Mechanical Engineers

This is a list of academic journals published by the American Society of Mechanical Engineers.

== List ==
Journal	ISO 4 abbreviation	Published	ISSN
Applied Mechanics Reviews	Appl. Mech. Rev.	1948-present	ISSN 0003-6900 (print); ISSN 2379-0407 (web)
ASCE-ASME Journal of Risk and Uncertainty in Engineering Systems, Part B: Mechanical Engineering (Note: Part A is published by the American Society of Civil Engineers)	ASCE-ASME J. Risk Uncertain. Eng. Syst. B	2015–present	ISSN 2332-9017 (print); ISSN 2332-9025 (web)
ASME Journal of Engineering and Science in Medical Diagnostics and Therapy	ASME J. Eng. Sci. Med. Diagn. Ther.	2018-present	ISSN 2572-7958 (print); ISSN 2572-7966 (web)
ASME Journal of Heat and Mass Transfer	ASME J. Heat Mass Transf.	2023-present	ISSN 2832-8450 (print); ISSN 2832-8469 (web)
ASME Letters in Dynamic Systems and Control	ASME Lett. Dyn. Syst. Control	2021-present	ISSN 2689-6117 (print); ISSN 2689-6125 (web)
ASME Open Journal of Engineering	ASME Open J. Eng.	2022-present	ISSN 2770-3495 (print)
Journal of Applied Mechanics	J. Appl. Mech.	1933-present	ISSN 0021-8936 (print); ISSN 1528-9036 (web)
Journal of Autonomous Vehicles and Systems	J. Auton. Veh. Sys.	2021-present	ISSN 2690-702X (print); ISSN 2690-7038 (web)
Journal of Basic Engineering	J. Basic. Eng.	1959-1972 (Note: Discontinued in 1972, when it was split into the newly created Journal of Fluids Engineering and Journal of Engineering Materials and Technology.)	ISSN 0021-9223 (print)
Journal of Biomechanical Engineering	J. Biomech Eng.	1977-present	ISSN 0148-0731 (print); ISSN 1528-8951 (web)
Journal of Computational and Nonlinear Dynamics	J. Comput. Nonlinear Dyn.	2006-present	ISSN 1555-1415 (print); ISSN 1555-1423 (web)
Journal of Computing and Information Science in Engineering	J. Comput. Inf. Sci. Eng.	2001-present	ISSN 1530-9827 (print); ISSN 1944-7078 (web)
Journal of Dynamic Systems, Measurement, and Control	J. Dyn. Syst. Meas. Control	1971-present	ISSN 0022-0434 (print); ISSN 1528-9028 (web)
Journal of Electrochemical Energy Conversion and Storage	J. Electrochem. Energy Convers. Storage	2004-present	ISSN 2381-6872 (print); ISSN 2381-6910 (web)
Journal of Electronic Packaging	J. Electron. Packag.	1989-present	ISSN 1043-7398 (print); ISSN 1528-9044 (web)
Journal of Energy Resources Technology	J. Energy Resour. Technol.	1979-present	ISSN 0195-0738 (print); ISSN 1528-8994 (web)
Journal of Engineering for Gas Turbines and Power	J. Eng. Gas Turbines Power	1959-present	ISSN 0742-4795 (print); ISSN 1528-8919 (web)
Journal of Engineering for Industry	J. Eng. Ind.	1959-1996 (Note: Renamed in 1996 to Journal of Manufacturing Science and Engineering)	ISSN 0022-0817 (print); ISSN 2161-9433 (web)
Journal of Engineering for Sustainable Buildings and Cities	J. Eng. Sustain. Build. Cities	2020-present	ISSN 2642-6641 (print); ISSN 2642-6625 (web)
Journal of Engineering Materials and Technology	J. Eng. Mater. Technol.	1973-present	ISSN 0094-4289 (print); ISSN 1528-8889 (web)
Journal of Fluids Engineering	J. Fluids Eng.	1973-present	ISSN 0098-2202 (print); ISSN 1528-901X (web)
Journal of Fuel Cell Science and Technology	J. Fuel Cell Sci. Technol.	2004-2015 (Note: Renamed in 2016 to Journal of Electrochemical Energy Conversion and Storage)	ISSN 1550-624X (print); ISSN 1551-6989 (web)
Journal of Heat Transfer	J. Heat Transfer	1959-2022	ISSN 0022-1481 (print); ISSN 1528-8943 (web)
Journal of Lubrication Technology	J. Lubr. Technol.	1967-1983 (Note: Renamed in 1984 to Journal of Tribology)	ISSN 0022-2305 (print); ISSN 2161-9522 (web)
Journal of Manufacturing Science and Engineering	J. Manuf. Sci. Eng.	1996-present	ISSN 1087-1357 (print); ISSN 1528-8935 (web)
Journal of Mechanical Design	J. Mech. Des.	1990-present	ISSN 1050-0472 (print); ISSN 1528-9001 (web)
Journal of Mechanical Design	J. Mech. Des.	1978-1982 (Note: Renamed in 1983 to Journal of Mechanisms, Transmissions, and Automation in Design)	ISSN 0161-8458 (print)
Journal of Mechanisms, Transmissions, and Automation in Design	J. Mech. Transm. Autom. Des.	1983-1989 (Note: Renamed in 1990 to Journal of Mechanical Design.)	ISSN 0738-0666 (print); ISSN 2161-9573 (web)
Journal of Mechanisms and Robotics	J. Mech. Robot.	2009-present	ISSN 1942-4302 (print); ISSN 1942-4310 (web)
Journal of Medical Devices	J. Med. Devices	2007-present	ISSN 1932-6181 (print); ISSN 1932-619X (web)
Journal of Micro and Nano-Manufacturing	J. Micro Nano-Manuf.	2013-present	ISSN 2166-0468 (print); ISSN 2166-0476 (web)
Journal of Nanotechnology in Engineering and Medicine	J. Nanotechnol. Eng. Med.	2010-2015	ISSN 1949-2944 (print); ISSN 1949-2952 (web)
Journal of Nondestructive Evaluation, Diagnostics and Prognostics of Engineering Systems	J. Nondestruct. Eval. Diagn. Progn. Eng. Syst.	2017-present	ISSN 2572-3901 (print); ISSN 2572-3898 (web)
Journal of Nuclear Engineering and Radiation Science	J. Nucl. Eng. Radiat. Sci.	2014-present	ISSN 2332-8983 (print); ISSN 2332-8975 (web)
Journal of Offshore Mechanics and Arctic Engineering	J. Offshore Mech. Arct. Eng.	1987-present	ISSN 0892-7219 (print); ISSN 1528-896X (web)
Journal of Pressure Vessel Technology	J. Pressure Vessel Technol.	1974-present	ISSN 0094-9930 (print); ISSN 1528-8978 (web)
Journal of Solar Energy Engineering	J. Sol. Energy Eng.	1980-present	ISSN 0199-6231 (print); ISSN 1528-8986 (web)
Journal of Thermal Science and Engineering Applications	J. Thermal Sci. Eng. Appl.	2009-present	ISSN 1948-5085 (print); ISSN 1948-5093 (web)
Journal of Tribology	J. Tribol.	1984-present	ISSN 0742-4787 (print); ISSN 1528-8897 (web)
Journal of Turbomachinery	J. Turbomach.	1986-present	ISSN 0889-504X (print); ISSN 1528-8900 (web)
Journal of Verification, Validation and Uncertainty Quantification	J. Verif. Valid. Uncert.	2015-present	ISSN 2377-2158 (print); ISSN 2377-2166 (web)
Journal of Vibration and Acoustics	J. Vib. Acoust.	1990-present	ISSN 1048-9002 (print); ISSN 1528-8927 (web)
Transactions of the American Society of Mechanical Engineers	Trans. ASME	1880-1958 (Note: Renamed in 1959 to Journal of Basic Engineering)	ISSN 0097-6822 (print)

== See also ==
- List of American Society of Civil Engineers academic journals
- List of IEEE publications
