= EFM =

EFM may refer to:

- E FM, a radio channel in Sri Lanka
- Canon EF-M lens mount
- Canon EF-M camera
- Edinburgh Dragon Trust, a British investment trust
- Education for Ministry, an American Christian educational program
- EFM Academy, now part of SCOPE Maastricht, a study association in the Netherlands
- EFM Records, an American record label
- Eight-to-fourteen modulation
- Electronic fetal monitoring
- Electrostatic force microscope
- Enterprise feedback management
- Environmental Fluid Mechanics, a scholarly journal
- Ethernet in the first mile
- European Film Market, a film market held during the Berlin International Film Festival
- The FM extended band in Brazil, abbreviated eFM
