= Kingsley O. Harrop-Williams =

Kingsley Ormonde Harrop-Williams
- Born: December 12, 1947; Golden Grove, West Coast Berbice, Guyana
- Died: September 22, 2019; United States
- Education: City University of New York (B.Sc., Civil Engineering, magna cum laude); City University of New York (M.Sc.); Rensselaer Polytechnic Institute (Ph.D., Soil Mechanics and Engineering)
- Occupations: Civil engineer, educator, poet, author, philanthropist
- Years active: 1970–2019
- Notable work: Intrusions of Chance: Autobiography of K.O. Harrop from Penury to Ph.D. (2016); Poetry of K.O. Harrop: Reflections on Life, History, Injustice, Resistance, Civil Rights, and Guyana (2013)
- Spouse: Lynette Gibson
- Children: Kingsley Audwin Harrop-Williams (b. 1973); Tippi Ann Parson (b. 1976); Cher Anemone Marquez (b. 1981)
- Parent(s): Edric Christopher Harrop-Williams; Adelaide Olivia Pereira-Jardin
- Awards: Charles Rathbone Award; Grand Prize, National Library of Poetry North American Open Poetry Contest (1995); Listed in Marquis Who’s Who in the World (1989–1990); Listed on the Immigrant Wall of Honor, Ellis Island

Dr. Kingsley Ormonde Harrop-Williams, also known as K.O. Harrop (12 December 1947 – 22 September 2019), was a Guyanese-born civil engineer, poet, author, educator, and philanthropist whose career included contributions to engineering, literature, and community projects.

== Early life and education ==
Kingsley Ormonde Harrop-Williams was born on 12 December 1947 in Golden Grove, West Coast Berbice, British Guiana, and raised in Smythfield. He was the son of Edric Christopher Harrop-Williams and Adelaide Olivia Pereira-Jardin. He attended Berbice High School and later worked as a clerk at the Transport and Harbors Department in New Amsterdam.

In 1970, Harrop-Williams emigrated to the United States on a student visa. While working minimum-wage jobs to support his widowed mother in Guyana, he pursued higher education at the City University of New York (CUNY), graduating magna cum laude with a degree in civil engineering. He went on to earn a Master’s degree at CUNY and a Ph.D. in soil mechanics and engineering from Rensselaer Polytechnic Institute, funded by a full scholarship. His autobiography, Intrusions of Chance, recounts his journey from poverty to academic success.

== Career and contributions ==
=== Engineering career ===
Harrop-Williams had an extensive career as a civil engineer and educator. He taught at the City College of New York, Carnegie Mellon University, and George Mason University. His professional roles included working as a civil engineer for the U.S. Air Force and U.S. Navy and serving as a consultant for NASA, the Maryland Department of Transportation, and the U.S. Army.

He was a registered professional engineer in Pennsylvania, Maryland, Virginia, and Washington, D.C., and an expert in hydrogeology. Over his career, he published 30 technical articles, contributing significantly to the fields of soil mechanics and geotechnical engineering. His research has been referenced in prominent studies, including those archived in the ASCE Library, ScienceDirect, KoreaScience, and Google Scholar.

Kingsley’s work is highlighted in Peterson's Annual Guides to Graduate Study, published in 1982 by the University of Michigan. He also features in Transactions of the American Society of Civil Engineers (1990), Probabilistic Solutions in Geotechnics (1988), Spatial Modelling and Failure Analysis of Natural and Engineering Disasters through Data-Based Methods, Volume III (2024), the Canadian Geotechnical Journal (1997), Recent Advances in Engineering Mechanics and Their Impact on Civil Engineering Practice (1983), among other publications.

=== Literary works ===
Harrop-Williams was an author and poet whose works addressed themes of identity, colonialism, resistance, civil rights, and engineering. His notable publications include:

- Intrusions of Chance: Autobiography of K.O. Harrop from Penury to Ph.D. (2016) – A memoir detailing his rise from poverty in Guyana to earning a doctorate in the United States.
- Poetry of K.O. Harrop: Reflections on Life, History, Injustice, Resistance, Civil Rights, and Guyana (2013) – A collection of poetry reflecting his personal experiences and broader historical and social struggles.

In 1995, Harrop-Williams received the Grand Prize in the National Library of Poetry North American Open Poetry Contest, underscoring his talent and impact in the literary world.

=== Published Technical Work ===
- Discussion of Clay Liner Permeability: Evaluation and Variation, published in the Journal of Geotechnical Engineering (Aug, 1987)
- Discussion of “Predicting Ground‐Water Response to Precipitation” by Dwight A. Sangrey, Kingsley O. Harrop‐Williams, and Jeffrey A. Klaiber (July, 1984)
- Finite Element Analysis of Random Soil Media (Jan, 1988)
- Earthquake‐Induced Shear Stresses in Soils (Nov, 1988)
- Random Nature of Soil Porosity and Related Properties (April, 1989)
- Interference Between Geotechnical Structures (Feb, 1985)
- Closure to “Arch in Soil Arching” by Kingsley Harrop‐Williams (March, 1989, Vol. 115, No. 3
- Geostatic Wall Pressures (Sep, 1989)
- Reliability of Geotechnical Systems (1980)
- Probability Distribution of Strength Parameters in Uniform Soils, Vol. 112, No. 3, March 1986, ASCE Engineering Mechanics Journal.
- Reliability of Cyclic Load Deformation Models for Cohesive Soil, Vol. 6, No. 2, January 1987, Journal of Soil Dynamics and Earthquake Engineering.
- Stochastic Description of Undrained Soil Strength, Vol. 22, November 1985, Canadian Geotechnical Journal.
- Risk correction factors for bearing capacity analysis (1985)
- Artificial Intelligence in Soil Exploration, 1st International Conference on Applications of Artificial Intelligence to Engineering Problems, Southampton University, UK, April 1986.
- Statistical Pattern Recognition and Learning for Construction Robots", 2nd Conference on Robotics in Construction, Pittsburgh, PA, June 1985.
- Discussion of “Bivariate Lognormal Probability Distribution” by Nick T. Thomopoulos and Anatol Longinow (December, 1984, Vol. 110, No. 12)

=== Mentorship and advocacy ===
Throughout his life, Harrop-Williams emphasized the transformative power of education. He mentored students from underprivileged backgrounds and championed initiatives that supported marginalized communities. His philanthropic efforts included funding the construction of the Martin Luther King Jr. Memorial and the African American Museum in Washington, D.C. In his native Guyana, he supported projects such as the New Amsterdam Special Needs Playground.

=== Recognition and honors ===
Harrop-Williams received numerous accolades for his contributions to engineering, literature, and civic life. He was listed in Marquis Who’s Who in the World (1989–1990) and honored on the Immigrant Wall of Honor at Ellis Island. His civic leadership earned him the Charles Rathbone Award, recognizing his dedication to social advancement. Additionally, his expertise in engineering and transportation led to his appointment as a member of the Transportation Research Board (TRB) Committee on Soil and Rock Properties.

== Legacy ==
Harrop-Williams’ body of work is an intersection of the personal and the political. His writings explored the Guyanese experience, the legacies of colonialism, and universal struggles for equality and justice.

Through his mentorship and writing, Harrop-Williams contributed to the intellectual and cultural life of Guyana.

Dr. Kingsley Ormonde Harrop-Williams and his wife, Lynette Gibson, had three children:

- Kingsley Audwin Harrop-Williams (b. 1973)
- Tippi Ann Parson (b. 1976)
- Cher Anemone Marquez (b. 1981)

== Death ==
Kingsley Ormonde Harrop-Williams died on 22 September 2019. He leaves behind his children, many grandchildren, nieces and nephews.
