= Michael Beer =

Michael Beer may refer to:

- Michael Beer (cricketer) (born 1984), Australian cricketer
- Michael Beer (poet) (1800–1833), German poet
- Michael Beer, editor-in-chief of the ASCE-ASME Journal of Risk and Uncertainty in Engineering Systems
