= Mirosław J. Skibniewski =

American professor

- Born: September 1957 (age 68); Poland
- Education: Warsaw University of Technology; Carnegie Mellon University
- Awards: NSF Presidential Young Investigator Award (1986), ASCE Walter L. Huber Research Prize (1998), Tucker-Hasegawa Research Award (2007)
- Scientific career
- Fields: Construction & Automation
- Workplaces: Purdue University; University of Maryland, College Park
- Thesis: Engineering and Economic Analysis of Robotics Application Potential in Selected Construction Operations (1986)

Mirosław J. Skibniewski is a professor of construction engineering and project management in the A. James Clark School of Engineering of the University of Maryland, College Park. Since 1994, he has been the editor-in-chief of Automation in Construction (Elsevier). He is also a co-editor-in-chief of Frontiers of Engineering Management (Springer Nature).

== Biography ==
Skibniewski obtained his PhD in 1986 from Carnegie Mellon University. He also holds a Master of Science from Carnegie Mellon University (1983) and a Master of Engineering from Warsaw University of Technology (1981). Before his appointment at the University of Maryland, College Park, he spent approximately 20 years at Purdue University as a faculty member and administrator.

Before working in academia, Skibniewski was an engineering professional for Intertek Professional Service Industries, Inc (formerly Pittsburgh Testing Laboratory), where he led structural, construction and industrial safety investigations as well as various forensic engineering projects.

Currently, Skibniewski holds several honorary positions in multiple universities in the Americas, Asia and Europe.

== Research ==
Skibniewski's research focuses on automation and robotic applications in construction, information technologies for project management, as well as construction project management and engineering. He has published over 300 papers in the field of construction, reaching an h-index of 64 in Google Scholar and 49 on Scopus.

== Selected works ==
Nitithamyong, P., & Skibniewski, M. J. (2004). Web-based construction project management systems: how to make them successful?. Automation in construction, 13(4), 491–506.

Skibniewski, M. J., & Chao, L. C. (1992). Evaluation of advanced construction technology with AHP method. Journal of Construction Engineering and Management, 118(3), 577–593.

Russell, J. S., & Skibniewski, M. J. (1988). Decision criteria in contractor prequalification. Journal of management in engineering, 4(2), 148–164.

== Selected awards ==
Skibniewski received many awards over his career:

- Presidential Young Investigator Award by National Science Foundation (1986)
- Walter L. Huber Research Prize by American Society of Civil Engineers (1998)
- Civil Engineering Faculty Medal by the Slovak University of Technology (2004)
- Tucker-Hasegawa Research Award by the International Association for Automation and Robotics in Construction (2007)
