= Xiaobo Qu =

- Engineering career
- Discipline: Civil engineering Traffic; Transportation
- Institutions: Chalmers University of Technology

Xiaobo Qu (Chinese: 曲小波) is a Chinese civil engineer, traffic and transportation scientist. He has been a professor at the Department of Architecture and Civil Engineering of Chalmers University of Technology since March 2018. He is also leader of the research group Urban Mobility Systems in the Division of Geology and Geotechnics at the same university. He has been elected as a member of both the European Academy of Sciences and Academia Europaea in 2020.

== Academic career ==
Prior to his professorial appointment at Chalmers University of Technology, he lectured at the University of Technology Sydney and Griffith University. He is an associate editor for IEEE Transactions on Cybernetics, ASCE Journal of Transportation Engineering, Part A: Systems, IEEE Intelligent Transportation Systems Magazine, ASCE-ASME Journal of Risk and Uncertainty in Engineering Systems, and Journal of Intelligent and Connected Vehicles, and guest editor for eight journals.

Xiaobo Qu's research focuses on integrating emerging technologies with urban mobility systems. Some results of his research have been practically implemented in freeway management, public transport operations, and intelligent vehicles. Xiaobo Qu has taught traffic and transport courses in Australia and Sweden. He has been invited to give keynote speeches at a number of conferences, and has been awarded Griffith Sciences Learning and Teaching Citations, Early Career Researcher Award, and Excellence of a Research Group Award in 2015.
