= David Mohrig =

American geologist

David Mohrig is an American professor of geology and geomorphology whose works have been published in such journals as the Geological Society of America Bulletin, Journal of Hydraulic Engineering and many others. Currently he works at Jackson School of Geosciences of Austin, Texas.
