= Journal of Hazardous, Toxic & Radioactive Waste =

Journal of Hazardous, Toxic, and Radioactive Waste
- Discipline: Engineering
- Language: English
- Edited by: Rao Y. Surampalli

Publication details
- Former name(s): Practice Periodical of Hazardous, Toxic, and Radioactive Waste
- History: 1997–present
- Publisher: American Society of Civil Engineers
- Frequency: Quarterly

Standard abbreviations
- ISO 4: J. Hazard. Toxic Radioact. Waste

Indexing
- CODEN: JHTRBP
- ISSN: 2153-5493 (print); 2153-5515 (web)

Links
- Journal homepage

The Journal of Hazardous, Toxic, and Radioactive Waste is a quarterly peer-reviewed scientific journal published by the American Society of Civil Engineers and covering planning and management for hazardous, toxic and radioactive wastes.

== History ==
The journal was established in 1997 as the Practice Periodical of Hazardous, Toxic, and Radioactive Waste, obtaining its current name in 2010.

== Abstracting and indexing ==
The journal is abstracted and indexed in Ei Compendex, ProQuest databases, Civil Engineering Database, Inspec, Scopus, and EBSCO databases.
