= Rao S. Govindaraju =

American academic

Rao S. Govindaraju is the Christopher B. and Susan S. Burke Professor of Civil Engineering at Purdue University. His specialty is hydraulic and hydrologic engineering. He is currently the editor-in-chief of American Society of Civil Engineers' Journal of Hydrologic Engineering.
