= Bilal M. Ayyub =

Scientist in civil engineering

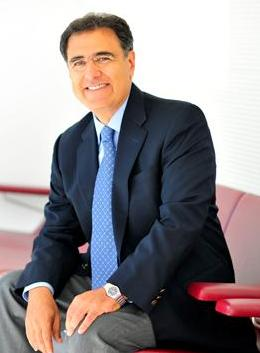
- Bilal Ayyub
- Born: 5 January 1958 (age 68); Tulkarm
- Scientific career
- Fields: Engineering (risk and uncertainty analysis)
- Institutions: University of Maryland, College Park

Bilal M. Ayyub (born 5 January 1958, Tulkarm, Palestine) is a researcher in risk analysis and reliability engineering. He has been a professor of civil and environmental engineering at the University of Maryland, College Park (UMD) since 1983, and is also the director of the Center for Technology and Systems Management at its A. James Clark School of Engineering.

== Biography ==
Ayyub was born in Tulkarm, Palestine, 5 January 1958 and moved to Kuwait in 1961. He was K12 schooled in Kuwait, and earned a Bachelors of Science in Civil Engineering from Kuwait University in 1980. He received both a Masters of Science in Civil Engineering (1981) and a Doctorate of Philosophy (1983) from the Georgia Institute of Technology.

== Career ==
He works in the areas of risk analysis, uncertainty modeling, decision analysis, and systems engineering. His specialty is risk and uncertainty analysis for decision and policy making including climate adaptation.

Ayyub is a distinguished member of the American Society of Civil Engineers (ASCE), an honorary member of the American Society of Mechanical Engineers (ASME), and a fellow of the Society for Risk Analysis (SRA), the Society of Naval Architects and Marine Engineers (SNAME) and the ASCE Structural Engineering Institute.

Ayyub provides advisory services as needed through BMA Engineering, Inc., a Bethesda, Maryland-based engineering consulting firm that works with infrastructure and defense systems.

== Publications ==
Ayyub is the founding editor-in-chief of the ASCE-ASME Journal of Risk and Uncertainty in Engineering Systems in its two parts: Part A. Civil Engineering and Part B. Mechanical Engineering. He is also on the editorial board of the Journal of Risk Analysis and the Journal of Ship Research of the SNAME. He is the author or co-author of more than 600 publications in journals and conference proceedings, and reports. He is author, editor, co-author, or co-editor of 20 books, including:

- Sea Level Rise and Coastal Infrastructure: Prediction, Risks and Solutions, ASCE, Reston, VA, 2011 (edited with Kearney).
- Vulnerability, Uncertainty, and Risk: Analysis, Modeling, and Management, ASCE, Reston, VA, 2011 (editor).
- Uncertainty Modeling and Analysis for Engineers and Scientists, Chapman & Hall/CRC, Press Boca Raton, Florida, 2006 (with Klir).
- Risk Analysis in Engineering and Economics, First Edition (2003), Second Edition (2014), Chapman and Hall/CRC Press, 2014.
- Elicitation of Expert Opinions for Uncertainty and Risks, CRC Press, 2002.
