= Journal of Pipeline Systems Engineering and Practice =

- Discipline: Engineering!-- or
- Language: English
- Edited by: -->

Publication details
- History: 2010–present
- Publisher: American Society of Civil Engineers (United States)
- Frequency: Quarterly
- Impact factor: 1.952 (2020)

Standard abbreviations
- ISO 4: J. Pipeline Syst. Eng. Pract.

Indexing
- CODEN: JPSEA2
- ISSN: 1949-1190 (print); 1949-1204 (web)

Links
- Journal homepage

The Journal of Pipeline Systems Engineering and Practice is a peer-reviewed scientific journal published by the American Society of Civil Engineers that covers topics on pipeline systems, from planning, construction, to safety and maintenance. This journal has a lot of practical coverage and a good resource for practicing engineers looking for environmental and sustainable pipeline information to address water distribution, wastewater systems, storm sewers and more.

== Abstracting and indexing ==
The journal is abstracted and indexed in Ei Compendex, ProQuest databases, Civil Engineering Database, Inspec, Science Citation Index Expanded, Scopus, and EBSCO databases.
