= Journal of Performance of Constructed Facilities =

- Discipline: Engineering
- Language: English
- Edited by: Norbert Delatte

Publication details
- History: 1987–present
- Publisher: American Society of Civil Engineers
- Frequency: Bimonthly
- Impact factor: 1.542 (2018)

Standard abbreviations
- ISO 4: J. Perform. Constr. Facil.

Indexing
- ISSN: 0887-3828 (print); 1943-5509 (web)

Links
- Journal homepage

The Journal of Performance of Constructed Facilities is a peer-reviewed scientific journal published by the American Society of Civil Engineers and is engaged in sharing information on failures and performance issues of constructed facilities. The editors seek papers that address construction practices, failure investigation (both technical and procedural failures), as well as reconstruction and ethics topics. Also covered are topics that address performance and maintenance of existing structures.

== Abstracting and indexing ==
The journal is abstracted and indexed in Ei Compendex, Science Citation Index Expanded, ProQuest databases, Civil Engineering Database, Inspec, Scopus, and EBSCO databases.
