= Boston Society of Civil Engineers =

Engineering society in the United States

The Boston Society of Civil Engineers, now the Boston Society of Civil Engineers Section of the American Society of Civil Engineers, was established in 1848. It claims to be the oldest engineering society in the United States by four years, and has over 4,000 members.

According to the ASCE 150th anniversary publication in 2002, the BSCE founding members, including James Laurie, met at the U.S. Hotel in Boston on April 26, 1848, four years before the founding of the ASCEA. Laurie became the first president if the ASCEA, which originally included Architects in its name, in 1852. From 1855 to 1857, when the American Institute of Architects was formed out of the ASCEA, and until 1867, the organization did little.

In 1867, the ASCEA found its five shares of the New York Central Railroad, which has issued a sufficient amount in dividends for the society to return to business.
