= Charles Chanson =

French army general (1902–1951)

- Born: 18 February 1902; Grenoble, France
- Died: 31 July 1951 (aged 49); Sa Đéc, Vietnam
- Relatives: Hubert Chanson
- Military career
- Allegiance: France
- Branch: French Army
- Service years: 1922–1951
- Rank: General
- Unit: Commander of the French-Indo-Chinese forces in southern Vietnam
- Commands: Commandeur of the Legion of Honor
- Conflicts: World War II; First Indochina War

Charles Chanson (1902–1951) was the Commander of the French-Indo-Chinese forces in southern Vietnam during the First Indochina War.

Born on 18 February 1902 in Grenoble, France, Charles Marie Ferreol Chanson was educated at Ecole Polytechnique (entrance: 1922). His father was General Henri Chanson and his great grandfather was General Achille Chanson. All were artillery officers.

During World War II, Chanson served in France during the Battle of France (1939–1940), in North Africa from 1941, and later with the general staff of U.S. General Dwight D. Eisenhower in Germany.

He was posted to Indochina in 1946 where he was commander of the French-Indo-Chinese forces in South Viet Nam.

During his five years in Indochina, he was credited with the restoration of peace and security in southern Vietnam following the capitulation of the Japanese Forces in 1945 and the void left by the Allied forces. Between 1950 and 1951, he worked closely with General Jean Marie de Lattre de Tassigny who commanded French troops in Indochina, providing troops to successfully defend northern Vietnam against the Viet Minh.

Chanson was killed on 31 July 1951 at Sadec (or Sa Đéc) in southern Vietnam, when a caodaist suicide bomber exploded a device of several grenades. Governor Thai Lap Thanh and the bomber also died in the explosion. One of his faithful subordinates Colonel Leroy wrote that the success in South Vietnam of Chanson was the reason for his murder and that foreign western secret services had backed it.
