= Ashbel Welch =

American civil engineer

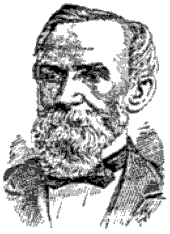
- Born: December 4, 1809; Nelson, New York, US
- Died: September 25, 1882 (aged 72); Lambertville, New Jersey, US
- Occupation: Civil engineer
- Spouse: Mary Hannah Seabrook (m. 1834)
- Children: 7

Ashbel Welch (1809–1882) was an American civil engineer and a president of the American Society of Civil Engineers (ASCE) in 1882.

== Early life and education ==
On December 4, 1809, Welch was born in Nelson, New York.

In 1843, he earned an honorary degree of Master of Arts from the College of New Jersey at Princeton, which was renamed to Princeton University in 1896.

== Career ==
In 1826, Welch started his engineering career as a rodman on the Lehigh and Delaware Canal for his brother Sylvester Welch.

In 1830, Welch joined engineers of Canvass White in Trenton, New Jersey on the construction of the Delaware and Raritan Canal. In 1832, Welch was in charge of digging the feeder northwestward from Trenton, New Jersey. Welch selected Lambertville for his headquarters. In 1834, the Delaware and Raritan Canal completed and it opened for business.

In 1836, at age 26, Welch was appointed the chief engineer of the Joint Companies (Delaware and Raritan Canal Company & Camden and Amboy Railroad & Transportation Company).

In 1836, Welch was appointed Chief Engineer of the Philadelphia and Trenton Railroad.

In 1844, Welch traveled to England and supervised the construction of an order of guns for the United States Navy.

In 1863, Welch led the efforts on installation of a block signaling system on the Camden and Amboy Railroad between Philadelphia and New Brunswick. First in America, The signaling system was a first installation of in America, which later used on all American railroads.

In 1869, Welch became President of the Bel-Del Railroad and the Flemington Railroad.

In 1872, Welch resigned as President of United Companies. Welch became the superintendent of Bel-Del Railroad under Pennsylvania Railroad (PRR) management. Welch maintained his duties as a chief engineer.

== Personal life ==
On October 25, 1834, Welch married Mary Hannah Seabrook in Lambertville, New Jersey. They had seven children.

On September 25, 1882, Welch died in his home on 21 York St, Lambertville, New Jersey.

== See also ==
- Pennsylvania Railroad
- William H. Rau - photographer who documented scenic views of Pennsylvania RR.
