= Journal of Aerospace Engineering =

- Discipline: Engineering
- Language: English
- Edited by: Wieslaw Binienda

Publication details
- History: 1988–present
- Publisher: American Society of Civil Engineers
- Frequency: Bimonthly
- Impact factor: 1.373 (2018)

Standard abbreviations
- ISO 4: J. Aerosp. Eng.

Indexing
- ISSN: 0893-1321 (print); 1943-5525 (web)

Links
- Journal homepage

The Journal of Aerospace Engineering is a peer-reviewed scientific journal published by the American Society of Civil Engineers and combines civil engineering with aerospace technology (but also incorporates other elements of civil engineering) to develop structures for space and extreme conditions. Topics of interest include aerodynamics, computational fluid dynamics, wind tunnel testing of buildings and structures, aerospace structures and materials, and more.

== History ==
The journal has previously published under the names Journal of the Aero-Space Transport Division (1962-1966) and as the Journal of the Air Transport Division (1956-1961)

== Abstracting and indexing ==
The journal is abstracted and indexed in Ei Compendex, Science Citation Index Expanded, ProQuest databases, Civil Engineering Database, Inspec, Scopus, and EBSCO databases.
