= Journal of Composites for Construction =

- Discipline: Engineering
- Language: English
- Edited by: Fabio Matta

Publication details
- History: 1997–present
- Publisher: American Society of Civil Engineers
- Frequency: Bimonthly
- Impact factor: 2.606 (2018)

Standard abbreviations
- ISO 4: J. Compos. Constr.

Indexing
- CODEN: JCCOF2
- ISSN: 1090-0268 (print); 1943-5614 (web)

Links
- Journal homepage

The Journal of Composites for Construction is a peer-reviewed scientific journal published by the American Society of Civil Engineers and publishes original content dealing with the use of fiber-reinforced composite materials in construction. The journal editors are looking for papers that bridge the gap between research in the mechanics and manufacturing science of composite materials and the analysis and design of large civil engineering structural systems and their construction processes.

== ABstracting and indexing ==
The journal is abstracted and indexed in Ei Compendex, Science Citation Index Expanded, ProQuest databases, Civil Engineering Database, Inspec, Scopus, and EBSCO databases.
