= Karattadipalayam =

Karattadipalayam Lakkampatti
- Town panchayat
- Location in Tamil Nadu, India Karattadipalayam (India)
- Coordinates: 11°27′13″N 77°26′18″E
- Country: India
- State: Tamil Nadu
- District: Erode
- Named for: Village below the small hill

Government
  - Type: Town panchayat

Population (2001)
  - Total: 3,000

Languages
  - Official: Tamil
- Time zone: UTC+5:30 (IST)
- PIN: 638453
- Telephone code: 04285
- Vehicle registration: TN 36

Karattadipalayam is a village in Gobichettipalayam Taluk of Erode district in Tamil Nadu. It is part of the Lakkampatti town panchayat. Gobi Arts and Science College, an autonomous institution affiliated to Bharathiar University, is situated in Karattadipalayam.

== Notable residents ==
G. V. Loganathan, former Virginia Tech professor and victim of the 2007 Virginia Tech shooting
