= Balkema =

Balkema is a surname. Notable people with the surname include:

- August Aimé Balkema (1906–1996), Dutch book trader and publisher
- Chris Balkema, American politician
- Nicholas Balkema (1865–1954), American politician
- Simon Balkema (1896–1971), Dutch wrestler
