= Journal of Soft Computing in Civil Engineering =

- Discipline: Civil engineering, soft computing
- Language: English
- Edited by: Hosein Naderpour

Publication details
- History: 2017–present
- Publisher: Pouyan Press (Iran)
- Frequency: Quarterly
- Open access: Yes
- License: CC-BY 4.0

Standard abbreviations
- ISO 4: J. Soft Comput. Civ. Eng.

Indexing
- ISSN: 2588-2872
- OCLC no.: 1229467171

Links
- Journal homepage; Online access; Online archive

The Journal of Soft Computing in Civil Engineering is a quarterly peer-reviewed open-access scientific journal covering soft computing applications in civil engineering. It was established in 2017 and is a member of the Committee on Publication Ethics. The editor-in-chief is Hosein Naderpour. The journal is indexed and abstracted in Scopus.
