= American Water Resources Association =

- Founded: 1964
- Founder: Sandor Csallany
- Headquarters: Middleburg, Virginia
- Members: 2,000
- President: Betsy A. Cody
- Website: https://www.awra.org/

Founded in 1964, the American Water Resources Association (AWRA) is a multidisciplinary not-for-profit professional association dedicated to the advancement of individuals in water resources management, research, and education. With more than 2,000 members, AWRA is the pre-eminent multidisciplinary U.S. organization in the field. AWRA’s membership includes engineers, educators, foresters, biologists, ecologists, geographers, managers, regulators, hydrologists, hydro-geologists, attorneys, economists, and water policy specialists. AWRA organizes conferences, publishes the peer-reviewed Journal of the American Water Resources Association (J AWRA), the Water Resources IMPACT magazine, and sponsors various member committees, State Sections and Student Chapters.

AWRA has a seat on the board of directors of the Renewable Natural Resources Foundation (RNRF), is a Member of the World Water Council, and participates in the WWC triennial World Water Forum.

== Publications ==
Each conference produces a proceedings (now available electronically, though earlier proceedings were in print): the Specialty Conference proceedings may include papers and abstracts, while the Annual Conference proceedings include abstracts only.

The Journal of the American Water Resources Association (JAWRA). JAWRA publishes original papers on broad topics related to water resource issues. All papers are refereed prior to publication. JAWRA is published bi-monthly, beginning with the February issue. Prior to 1997, JAWRA was known as Water Resources Bulletin.

Water Resources IMPACT Magazine, originally started as a newsletter, evolved into a magazine with articles addressing the practical issues of water resources management. Published bi-monthly, each issue is devoted to a particular topic. Some recent issues include Water Infrastructure Resilience, Geospatial Water Technology, U.S. Western Water Issues, including Colorado River Management.

== Caulfield Medal ==
Since 1988, AWRA has periodically awarded a Henry P. Caulfield Jr. Medal for Exemplary Contributions to National Water Policy to an individual who has achieved eminence in shaping national water policy. On presentation of the first medal to Caulfield in 1988, AWRA President Raymond Herrmann said: "this medal was established to honor an individual whose record of achievements and contributions in setting, designing, and implementing water resources policies at the national level have been extraordinary."

== Other Awards, & Scholarships ==
AWRA annually names recipients of numerous other awards, and also awards several scholarships.
