= Journal of Architectural Engineering =

- Discipline: Architecture, engineering
- Language: English
- Edited by: Ali M. Memari

Publication details
- History: 1995-present
- Publisher: American Society of Civil Engineers
- Frequency: Quarterly

Standard abbreviations
- ISO 4: J. Archit. Eng.

Indexing
- CODEN: JAEIED
- ISSN: 1076-0431 (print); 1943-5568 (web)

Links
- Journal homepage

The Journal of Architectural Engineering is a quarterly peer-reviewed scientific journal published by the American Society of Civil Engineers covering all aspects of engineering design, planning, construction, and operation of buildings, including building systems; structural, mechanical, and electrical engineering; acoustics; environmental quality; lighting; and sustainability.

== Abstracting and indexing ==
The journal is indexed in Ei Compendex, Emerging Sources Citation Index, ProQuest databases, Civil Engineering Database, Inspec, Scopus, and EBSCO databases.
