= Journal of Geotechnical & Geoenvironmental Engineering =

- Discipline: Geotechnical engineering
- Language: English
- Edited by: Rodrigo Salgado

Publication details
- Former name: Journal of Geotechnical Engineering
- History: 1875–present
- Publisher: American Society of Civil Engineers
- Frequency: Monthly
- Impact factor: 3.9 (2023)

Standard abbreviations
- ISO 4: J. Geotech. Geoenviron. Eng.

Indexing
- CODEN: JGGEFK
- ISSN: 1090-0241 (print); 1943-5606 (web)

Links
- Journal homepage

The Journal of Geotechnical and Geoenvironmental Engineering is a peer-reviewed scientific journal published by the American Society of Civil Engineers. It covers foundations, retaining structures, soil dynamics, slope stability, dams, earthquake engineering, environmental geotechnics, geosynthetics, groundwater monitoring, and coastal and geotechnical ocean engineering. Papers on new and emerging topics within the general discipline of geotechnical engineering are encouraged, as well as theoretical, practice-oriented papers and case studies.

== History ==
The journal began publication in 1956, but its origin goes back to the publication of the first volume of Transactions of the American Society of Civil Engineers in 1892.

The journal changed names in 1996. If was formerly known as the Journal of Geotechnical Engineering.

== Indexes ==
The journal is indexed in Ei Compendex, ProQuest, Civil engineering database, Inspec, Scopus, and EBSCOHost.
