= Automation in Construction =

Academic journal on civil engineering

- Discipline: Construction & Automation
- Language: English
- Edited by: Daniel Castro-Lacouture

Publication details
- History: 1992–present
- Publisher: Elsevier
- Open access: Hybrid
- Impact factor: 11.5 (2024)

Standard abbreviations
- ISO 4: Autom. Constr.

Indexing
- ISSN: 0926-5805 (print); 1872-7891 (web)

Links
- Journal homepage; Online archive

Automation in Construction is a peer-reviewed scientific journal published by Elsevier covering research on all aspects of advanced automation methods and computing methods for construction and management of the built environment. Mirosław J. Skibniewski (University of Maryland) has been the editor-in-chief from 1994 to 2024. Since June 2024, Daniel Castro-Lacouture (Purdue University) has been the new editor-in-chief. The journal was established in 1992 with H. Wagter, G. Smeltzer (Netherlands) and T.M. Knasel (USA) as founding editors-in-chief.

According to the Journal Citation Reports, the journal has a 2023 impact factor of 11.5.
