= SCOPE Maastricht =

- Founded: 2011
- Type: Non-Profit Organization
- Purpose: Study Association
- Location: Tapijnkazerne 11, Maastricht, The Netherlands
- Origins: Merger of EFM Academy and FAME Cooperation
- Region served: Maastricht University, School of Business and Economics
- Members: 7,500
- Key people: Arabella Blue Walker (President), Makomborero Soko (Secretary & IT Commissioner), Jon Ander Moro Usabiaga (Career Commissioner), Katharina Ortner (Vice President & External Relations Commissioner), Lisa Dalla Valle (External Relations Commissioner), Nicoleta Cojocaru (Treasurer) Tizian Aisenbrey (Academic Commissioner), Benedict Schumann (Marketing Commissioner) and Adina Tarbasanu (Engagement Commissioner)
- Revenue: ca. EUR 755,000 (fiscal year 2023-2024)
- Volunteers: 150
- Website: http://www.scope-maastricht.nl/

SCOPE Maastricht is the official study association (in the legal form of a Dutch vereniging) of the School of Business and Economics (commonly abbreviated as SBE) at Maastricht University, representing students and organizing social, academic and career-oriented activities and events. Since 2017 the study-specific associations SCOPE | 3MA (Marketing, Management, Organization), SCOPE | Economics (Economic Studies), and SCOPE | FOCUS (Finance, Accounting, Controlling) merged with the former umbrella association. Combined as SCOPE, the association operates on a non-profit basis. Revenue is generated through membership fees and sponsor contributions by local and multinational companies.

== History ==
SCOPE Maastricht was created in 2011 as a merger from study associations EFM Academy and FAME Cooperation. Back then, FAME Cooperation used to be the umbrella organization for study associations at the School of Business and Economics, operating a bookstore inside the faculty building. Other study associations under FAME included: 3MA (later: SCOPE | 3MA), FS FOCUS (later: SCOPE | FOCUS), IES Network (later: SCOPE | Economics) and Vectum (changed to SCOPE | Vectum in 2011 and was changed back to Vectum in 2019, and back to Vectum again in 2020). EFM Academy was formed as a vereniging under Dutch law in 2002 in a merger of EFM Alfa and EFM Imperator, two study associations that focused on Dutch and international students of the faculty respectively. EFM Academy focused on all first and second-year bachelor students in the B.Sc. programs International Business and Economics. Effectively, most students became member of EFM Academy in the beginning of their studies and stayed in the association for two or three semesters, before their membership was transferred to a study association specialized on their major or study track.
