= Journal of Cold Regions Engineering =

- Discipline: Civil engineering
- Language: English
- Edited by: Jon E. Zufelt

Publication details
- History: 1987-present
- Publisher: American Society of Civil Engineers
- Frequency: Quarterly

Standard abbreviations
- ISO 4: J. Cold Reg. Eng.

Indexing
- CODEN: JCRGEI
- ISSN: 0887-381X (print); 1943-5495 (web)

Links
- Journal homepage

The Journal of Cold Regions Engineering is a quarterly peer-reviewed scientific journal published by the American Society of Civil Engineers. It covers civil engineering related to cold regions.

== Abstracting and indexing ==
The journal is abstracted and indexed in Ei Compendex, Science Citation Index Expanded, ProQuest databases, Civil Engineering Database, Inspec, Scopus, and EBSCO databases.
