= Journal of Waterway, Port, Coastal, and Ocean Engineering =

- Discipline: Civil engineering
- Language: English
- Edited by: Andrew Kennedy

Publication details
- History: 1956-present
- Publisher: American Society of Civil Engineers (United States)
- Frequency: Bimonthly
- Impact factor: 1.625 (2018)

Standard abbreviations
- ISO 4: J. Waterw. Port Coast. Ocean Eng.

Indexing
- ISSN: 0733-950X (print); 1943-5460 (web)
- LCCN: 84640372
- OCLC no.: 426172826

Links
- Journal homepage

The Journal of Waterway, Port, Coastal, and Ocean Engineering is a bimonthly peer-reviewed scientific journal published by the American Society of Civil Engineers. It covers all aspects of civil engineering related to ocean, coastal, and river waters.

== Abstracting and indexing ==
The journal is abstracted and indexed in Civil Engineering Database, EBSCO databases, Ei Compendex, Inspec, ProQuest databases, Science Citation Index Expanded, and Scopus.

== History ==
The Transactions of the American Society of Civil Engineers was established in 1874 as the official journal of the American Society of Civil Engineers. By 1956, the society's growth and specialization required more coverage, and the journal was split into 12 specialized journals. The journal has undergone several name changes since:

- Journal of Waterway, Port, Coastal, and Ocean Engineering (1983–present)
- Journal of the Waterway, Port, Coastal and Ocean Division (1977-1982)
- Journal of the Waterways, Harbors, and Coastal Engineering Division (1970-1976)
- Journal of the Waterways and Harbors Division (1956-1969)
