= International Journal of Rock Mechanics and Mining Sciences =

- Discipline: Geology
- Language: English
- Edited by: Robert Zimmerman

Publication details
- Former names: International Journal of Rock Mechanics and Mining Sciences & Geomechanics Abstracts
- History: 1997-present
- Publisher: Elsevier
- Frequency: 8/year
- Impact factor: 7.1 (2020)

Standard abbreviations
- ISO 4: Int. J. Rock Mech. Min. Sci.

Indexing
- ISSN: 1365-1609
- LCCN: 97660982
- OCLC no.: 300963722

Links
- Journal homepage; Online access

The International Journal of Rock Mechanics and Mining Sciences is a peer-reviewed scientific journal published by Elsevier. The editor-in-chief is Robert Zimmerman. The focus of this journal is original research, site measurements, and case studies in rock mechanics and rock engineering pertaining to mining and civil engineering.

== Abstracting and indexing ==
The journal is abstracted and indexed in:

- Applied Mechanics Reviews
- Cambridge Scientific Abstracts
- Current Contents/Engineering, Computing & Technology
- Current Contents/Social & Behavioral Sciences
- Engineering Index
- GEOBASE
- Inspec
- International Civil Engineering Abstracts
- MSCI
- PASCAL
- Scopus
