= Journal of Computing in Civil Engineering =

- Discipline: Civil engineering
- Language: English
- Edited by: R. Raymond Issa

Publication details
- History: 1987-present
- Publisher: American Society of Civil Engineers
- Frequency: Bimonthly
- Impact factor: 4.640 (2020)

Standard abbreviations
- ISO 4: J. Comput. Civ. Eng.

Indexing
- ISSN: 0887-3801 (print); 1943-5487 (web)

Links
- Journal homepage

The Journal of Computing in Civil Engineering is a bimonthly peer-reviewed scientific journal published by the American Society of Civil Engineers. It covers research specific to computing as it relates to civil engineering.

== Abstracting and indexing ==
The journal is abstracted and indexed in Ei Compendex, Science Citation Index Expanded, ProQuest databases, Civil Engineering Database, Inspec, Scopus, and EBSCO databases.
