= Journal of Materials in Civil Engineering =

- Discipline: Materials science, civil engineering
- Language: English
- Edited by: Antonio Nanni

Publication details
- History: 1989–present
- Publisher: American Society of Civil Engineers
- Frequency: Monthly
- Impact factor: 3.651 (2021)

Standard abbreviations
- ISO 4: J. Mater. Civ. Eng.

Indexing
- CODEN: JMCEE7
- ISSN: 0899-1561 (print); 1943-5533 (web)
- LCCN: 89659640
- OCLC no.: 818976578

Links
- Journal homepage; Online access; Online archive

The Journal of Materials in Civil Engineering is a monthly peer-reviewed scientific journal established in 1989 by the American Society of Civil Engineers. It covers research and best practices concerns on development, processing, evaluation, applications, and performance of construction materials in civil engineering. It consists of four sections: cementitious material, asphalt, geo-materials, and hybrids (which encompass steel, timber, masonry, and composite materials).

== Abstracting and indexes ==
The journal is abstracted and indexed in Ei Compendex, ProQuest databases, Civil engineering database, Inspec, Scopus, and EBSCO databases.
