= Journal of Surveying Engineering =

- Discipline: Surveying engineering
- Language: English
- Edited by: Michael J. Olsen

Publication details
- History: 1873–present
- Publisher: American Society of Civil Engineers
- Frequency: Quarterly
- Impact factor: 1.766 (2018)

Standard abbreviations
- ISO 4: J. Surv. Eng.

Indexing
- ISSN: 0733-9453 (print); 1943-5428 (web)
- LCCN: 83643679
- OCLC no.: 426172798

Links
- Journal homepage

The Journal of Surveying Engineering is a quarterly peer-reviewed scientific journal published by the American Society of Civil Engineers (ASCE). It covers traditional areas of surveying and mapping, as well as new developments such as satellite positioning and navigation, computer applications, and digital mapping. It was established in 1956 (when ASCE Transactions was split into 12 technical journals).

== Abstracting and indexing ==
The journal abstracted and indexed in the Emerging Sources Citation Index and Scopus.

== Current Editorial Broad ==
==== Editor: ====
Sergio Baselga, Ph.D., M.ASCE, Universitat Politècnica de València

==== Associate Editors: ====
Dimitrios Bolkas, Ph.D., M.ASCE, Pennsylvania State University

Dan Gillins, Ph.D., P.L.S., M.ASCE, National Geodetic Survey

Jen-Yu Han, Ph.D., M.ASCE, National Taiwan University

Thomas H. Meyer, Ph.D., M.ASCE, University of Connecticut

Michael J. Olsen, Ph.D., M.ASCE, Oregon State University

Michael Starek, Ph.D., M.ASCE, Texas A&M University, Corpus Christi

Editorial Board:

Bishwa N. Acharya, Ph.D., M.ASCE, EMI, Inc., Kevin Ahlgren, National Geodetic Survey, Müge Albayrak, Ph.D., Oregon State University, Alireza Amiri-Simkooei, Ph.D., Delft University of Technology, Michael L. Dennis, Ph.D., P.E., R.L.S., M.ASCE, National Geodetic Survey, Robert Duchnowski, University of Warmia and Mazury in Olsztyn, Ahmed F. Elaksher, Ph.D., P.L.S., New Mexico State University, Anna Forte, University of Bologna, Andrew C. Kellie, P.L.S., M.ASCE, Murray State University, Ivandro Klein, Ph.D., Instituto Federal Santa Catarina, Andrzej Kobryń, Bialystok University of Technology, Rüdiger Lehmann, Ph.D., University of Applied Sciences Dresden, Yang Ma, Ph.D., M.ASCE, Hefei University of Technology, Chris Parrish, M.ASCE, Oregon State University, Jacek Paziewski, Ph.D., University of Warmia and Mazury in Olsztyn, Elena Rangelova, Ph.D., P.Eng., University of Calgary, Vinicius Francisco Rofatto, Universidade Federal de Uberlandia, David A. Rolbiecki, R.P.L.S., L.S.L.S., F.ASCE, Texas Military Department, Ergin Tari, Ph.D., Istanbul Technical University, Guoquan Wang, Ph.D., M.ASCE, University of Houston,Benjamin E. Wilkinson, Ph.D., University of Florida,Farzaneh Zangenehnejad, University of Calgary

Book Review Editor: Boudewijn H.W. van Gelder, Ph.D., M.ASCE, Purdue University
