= James Laurie =

American engineer (1811–1875)

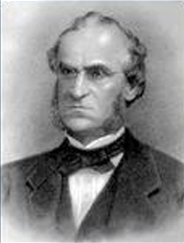
- Born: May 9, 1811; Bellsquarry, Scotland
- Died: March 16, 1875 (aged 63); Hartford, Connecticut, United States
- Years active: 1832–1875
- Organizations: Boston Society of Civil Engineers; American Society of Civil Engineers

James Laurie (May 9, 1811 – March 16, 1875) was an American engineer and one of the founders of American Society of Civil Engineers (ASCE). He performed surveying, bridge design, and route design for a number of railroads in New England.

== Engineering career ==
Laurie was born in Bellsquarry, Scotland, in 1811; from the 1820s until 1832, he was apprenticed to an instrument maker in the town. In 1832, he and James P. Kirkwood moved to Boston; Laurie then worked as an associate engineer under Kirkwood on the construction of the Norwich and Worcester Railroad (N&W). Laurie became chief engineer in 1835. In 1837, the Taft Tunnel at Lisbon, Connecticut (the oldest tunnel still in railroad use in its original form) was constructed during his tenure.

After leaving the N&W, Laurie performed surveys for railroads, canals, bridges, tunnels, and wharves. From 1845–47, he performed surveys for the Providence and Plainfield Railroad. In 1848, he opened his own office in Boston. From 1849 to 1851 he was an engineer for the New Jersey Central Railroad, which included planning the railroad's extension from Whitehouse, New Jersey, to Easton, Pennsylvania. In 1852, he opened a second office in New York City.

From 1853 until the early 1860s he was chief engineer of the Nova Scotia Railway. Under contract to the state of Massachusetts, he produced reports and surveys on the Troy & Greenfield Railroad and the unfinished Hoosac Tunnel in 1862. From 1861 to 1866, he was chief engineer of the Hartford and New Haven Railroad. During this time he oversaw the design and construction of the Warehouse Point railroad bridge – one of the first iron bridges in the country. In 1870, he examined two under-construction bridges: the Lyman Viaduct for the state of Connecticut, and the Eads Bridge for its bond holders.

== American Society of Civil Engineers ==
Laurie was an early attendee of Boston Society of Civil Engineers meetings; when it was incorporated in 1848, he was appointed president for two years. He was the first to present a paper to the society.

In 1852 Laurie opened an office in New York and began to build on the success of the Boston group. On November 5, 1852, Laurie was one of twelve engineers who met at the Rotunda and formed the first national-level society of engineers in the United States- the American Society of Civil Engineers and Architects. He soon was elected president. At a meeting on January 5, 1853 he presented the group's first paper, advocating an elevated railroad on Broadway to get around horse traffic congestion – 15 years before the city's first elevated line was built. The group was inactive from 1855 to 1867, partially due to Laurie's absence from the city. In 1867, he held a meeting to reinvigorate the society, and uncovered funding to establish a permanent office for the group. When Kirkwood succeeded Laurie as president in 1868, he gave credit to Laurie for his contributions.

Laurie had an interest in engineering ethics, and intended for the ASCE to represent the public interest and not merely those of its members. Although largely taught through experience rather than schooling, Laurie believed that proper education was essential for engineers and mandated that only college graduates could join the society.

Never married, Laurie died in Hartford, Connecticut, on March 16, 1875. The James Laurie Prize was established by ASCE on October 1, 1912. It is awarded annually to "a member of the Society who has made a definite contribution to the advancement of transportation engineering, either in research, planning, design, or construction.
