= Journal of Civil Engineering and Management =

- Language: English, Lithuanian
- Edited by: Edmundas K. Zavadskas

Publication details
- History: 1995-present
- Publisher: Taylor & Francis on behalf of Vilnius Gediminas Technical University and the Lithuanian Academy of Sciences (Lithuania)
- Frequency: Quarterly
- Impact factor: 3.711 (2010)

Standard abbreviations
- ISO 4: J. Civ. Eng. Manag.

Indexing
- ISSN: 1392-3730 (print); 1822-3605 (web)
- LCCN: 2002205821
- OCLC no.: 740963458

Links
- Journal homepage; Online content; Online archive

The Journal of Civil Engineering and Management is a peer-reviewed scientific journal covering civil engineering, founded in 1995. It is published by Taylor & Francis on behalf of Vilnius Gediminas Technical University and the Lithuanian Academy of Sciences. It is an official journal of the International Council for Research and Innovation in Building and Construction.
