= Journal of Infrastructure Systems =

- Discipline: Civil engineering
- Language: English
- Edited by: Sue McNeil

Publication details
- History: 1995-present
- Publisher: American Society of Civil Engineers
- Frequency: Quarterly
- Impact factor: 1.5384 (2018)

Standard abbreviations
- ISO 4: J. Infrastruct. Syst.

Indexing
- CODEN: JITSE4
- ISSN: 1076-0342 (print); 1943-555X (web)

Links
- Journal homepage

The Journal of Infrastructure Systems is a quarterly peer-reviewed scientific journal published by the American Society of Civil Engineers covering all aspects of civil engineering.

== Abstracting and indexing ==
The journal is abstracted and indexed in Ei Compendex, Science Citation Index Expanded, ProQuest databases, Civil Engineering Database, Inspec, Scopus, and EBSCO databases.
