= Arthur T. Ippen =

American hydrologist and engineer (1907–1974)

Arthur Thomas Ippen
- Born: July 28, 1907; London, England
- Died: April 5, 1974 (aged 66); Belmont, Massachusetts, U.S.
- Education: Lindau-am-Bodensee, Technische Hochschule, Caltech
- Known for: Sediment transport; MIT Hydrodynamics Lab;
- Scientific career
- Workplaces: Lehigh University, MIT
- Thesis: An analytical and experimental study of high velocity flow in curved sections of open channels (1936)
- Doctoral advisor: Theodore von Kármán, Robert T. Knapp

Arthur Thomas Ippen (July 28, 1907 – April 5, 1974) was a hydrologist and engineer and was an Institute Professor at the Massachusetts Institute of Technology. Born to German parents, he attended high school and college in Aachen, Germany graduating with a degree in Civil Engineering in 1931. He then took an Institute of International Education scholarship to study at the University of Iowa but after his doctoral advisor, Floyd Nagler, died suddenly, Ippen transferred to Caltech to complete his Ph.D. His doctoral work, supervised by Theodore von Kármán and Robert T. Knapp, explored sediment transport and open-channel high-velocity flows and represented the first American development of sonic wave analogy to free-surface flow.

Ippen's took his first faculty appointment at Lehigh University in 1938 and remained there until he accepted a position at MIT in 1945. While at MIT, he took over the existing Hydrodynamics Laboratory and built up a research program of staff graduate students examining the sonic analogy, transient flows, instrumentation, turbulence, cavitation, shoaling waves, stratified flow, and sediment transport. The laboratory eventually expanded and became the Ralph M. Parsons Laboratory for Water Resources and Hydrodynamics.

Ippen served as the President of the International Association for Hydraulic Research, was elected to the National Academy of Engineering in April 1967 and the American Academy of Arts and Sciences, and also received honorary doctorates from the University of Toulouse, University of Karlsruhe, and the University of Manchester.

He married Elisabeth Wagenplatz while at Caltech and had two children, Erich Peter and Karin Ann. Erich P. Ippen is a professor of electrical engineering and physics at MIT and a fellow member of the National Academy of Engineering. Elisabeth died in 1953 and Ippen married Ruth Calvert in 1955.
