= Journal of Hydrologic Engineering =

- Discipline: Hydrology
- Language: English
- Edited by: Rao S. Govindaraju

Publication details
- History: 1996–present
- Publisher: American Society of Civil Engineers (United States)
- Frequency: monthly

Standard abbreviations
- ISO 4: J. Hydrol. Eng.

Indexing
- ISSN: 1084-0699

Links
- Journal homepage

The Journal of Hydrologic Engineering is a monthly engineering journal, first published by the American Society of Civil Engineers in 1996. The journal provides information on the development of new hydrologic methods, theories, and applications to current engineering problems. It publishes papers on analytical, experimental, and numerical methods with regard to the investigation and modeling of hydrological processes. It also publishes technical notes, book reviews, and forum discussions. Though the journal is based in the United States, articles dealing with subjects from around the world are accepted and published. The journal requires the use of the metric system, but allows for authors to also submit their papers in other systems of measure in addition to the SI system.

The journal is run by an editor-in-chief and a number of associate editors, who are respected professionals in the fields of hydrology and hydraulic engineering. The editors come from both academic and professional backgrounds and are responsible for screening submissions and forwarding articles to journal reviewers. The journal reviewers are subject matter experts who volunteer to review articles in order to determine if they should be published by the journal. The current editor-in-chief is Rao S. Govindaraju of Purdue University.

G. V. Loganathan of Virginia Polytechnic Institute and State University (a victim of the Virginia Tech massacre on 16 April 2007) was an associate editor.

== Editors ==
The following individuals have served as editor-in-chief:

- Rao S. Govindaraju (2013 – present)
- Vijay P. Singh (2005 – 2013)
- M. Levent Kavvas (1996–2005)

== Indexes ==
The journal is indexed in Google Scholar, Baidu, Elsevier (Ei Compendex), Clarivate Analytics (Web of Science), ProQuest, Civil engineering database, TRDI, OCLC (WorldCat), IET/INSPEC, Crossref, Scopus, and EBSCOHost.

== See also ==
- List of scientific journals
