= International Journal of Civil Engineering =

- Discipline: Civil engineering
- Language: English
- Edited by: Mohammad Hassan Baziar

Publication details
- History: 2003-present
- Publisher: Springer Science+Business Media on behalf of the Iranian Society of Civil Engineering and the Iran University of Science and Technology (Iran)
- Frequency: Monthly
- Open access: Hybrid
- Impact factor: 2.081 (2020)

Standard abbreviations
- ISO 4: Int. J. Civ. Eng.

Indexing
- ISSN: 1735-0522 (print); 2383-3874 (web)
- OCLC no.: 774594049

Links
- Journal homepage; Online archive

The International Journal of Civil Engineering is a peer-reviewed scientific journal published by Springer Science+Business Media on behalf of the Iranian Society of Civil Engineering and the Iran University of Science and Technology. It covers theoretical and research related to all aspects of civil engineering.

== Abstracting and indexing ==
The journal is abstracted and indexed in Scopus, Islamic World Science Citation Database, and the Science Citation Index Expanded. According to the Journal Citation Reports, the journal has a 2020 impact factor of 2.081.
