= Journal of Energy Engineering =

- Discipline: Energy engineering
- Language: English
- Edited by: Chung-Li Tseng

Publication details
- Former names: Journal of the Power Division; Journal of the Energy Division
- History: 1956–present
- Publisher: American Society of Civil Engineers
- Frequency: Quarterly
- Impact factor: 1.131 (2018)

Standard abbreviations
- ISO 4: J. Energy Eng.

Indexing
- CODEN: JLEED9
- ISSN: 0733-9402 (print); 1943-7897 (web)

Links
- Journal homepage

The Journal of Energy Engineering is a quarterly peer-reviewed scientific journal published by the American Society of Civil Engineers. It covers civil engineering as related to the production, distribution, and storage of energy.

== Abstracting and indexing ==
The journal is abstracted and indexed in:

- Ei Compendex,
- Science Citation Index Expanded,
- ProQuest databases,
- Civil Engineering Database,
- Inspec,
- Scopus, and
- EBSCO databases.

== History ==
The journal has been known by several names:

- Journal of the Power Division (1956-1978)
- Journal of the Energy Division (1979-1982)
- Journal of Energy Engineering (1983–present)
