= International Journal of Geomechanics =

- Discipline: Geomechanics
- Language: English
- Edited by: Marco Barla

Publication details
- History: 2001–present
- Publisher: American Society of Civil Engineers
- Frequency: Monthly
- Impact factor: 3.3 (2023)

Standard abbreviations
- ISO 4: Int. J. Geomech.

Indexing
- CODEN: JITSE4
- ISSN: 1532-3641 (print); 1943-5622 (web)

Links
- Journal homepage

The International Journal of Geomechanics is a monthly peer-reviewed scientific journal published by the American Society of Civil Engineers that focuses on geomechanics, emphasizing theoretical aspects, to include computational and analytical methods, and related validations.

== Abstracting and indexing ==
The journal is indexed in Ei Compendex, ProQuest databases, Civil Engineering Database, Inspec, Science Citation Index Expanded, and EBSCO databases.
