= Journal of Transportation Engineering, Part A: Systems =

Journal of American Society of Civil Engineers

- Language: English
- Edited by: Chris T. Hendrickson

Publication details
- Former names: Journal of Transportation Engineering, Part A: Systems
- History: 1875–present
- Publisher: American Society of Civil Engineers
- Frequency: Monthly

Standard abbreviations
- ISO 4: J. Transp. Eng. A

Indexing
- CODEN: JTEPBS
- ISSN: 2473-2907 (print); 2473-2893 (web)

Links
- Journal homepage

The Journal of Transportation Engineering, Part A: Systems is a peer-reviewed scientific journal published by the American Society of Civil Engineers. It covers planning, design, construction, operation, and maintenance of air, highway, rail, and urban transportation systems and infrastructure. Papers on road, bridge, and transit management; and transportation systems are encouraged, as well as those on connected and autonomous vehicles; highway engineering and economics, safety and environmental aspects of transportation.

== History ==
The journal modified its name in 2017, with the launch of the Journal of Transportation Engineering, Part B: Pavements.

== Indexes ==
The journal is indexed in Ei Compendex, ProQuest, Civil engineering database, Inspec, Scopus, and EBSCOHost.
