= Journal of Construction Engineering & Management =

Journal of Construction Engineering and Management
- Discipline: Civil engineering
- Language: English
- Edited by: Jesus M. de la Garza

Publication details
- Former name(s): Journal of Construction Engineering and Management
- History: 1956–present
- Publisher: American Society of Civil Engineers
- Frequency: Monthly
- Impact factor: 4.1 (2023)

Standard abbreviations
- ISO 4: J. Constr. Eng. Manag.

Indexing
- ISSN: 0733-9364 (print); 1943-7862 (web)
- LCCN: 83643674
- OCLC no.: 615557924

Links
- Journal homepage; Online access; Online archive

The Journal of Construction Engineering and Management is a monthly peer-reviewed scientific journal published by the American Society of Civil Engineers covering construction material handling, equipment, production planning, scheduling, estimating, labor productivity, contract administration, and construction management.

== Abstracting and indexing ==
The journal is abstracted and indexed in Ei Compendex, ProQuest databases, Civil Engineering Database, Inspec, Scopus, and EBSCO databases.
