= Journal of Bridge Engineering =

- Language: English
- Edited by: Sriram Narasimhan

Publication details
- Publisher: American Society of Civil Engineers
- Frequency: monthly
- Impact factor: 1.84 (2018)

Standard abbreviations
- ISO 4: J. Bridge Eng.

Indexing
- CODEN: JBENF2
- ISSN: 1084-0702 (print); 1943-5592 (web)

Links
- Journal homepage

The Journal of Bridge Engineering, is a peer-reviewed scientific journal about bridge engineering. It is published by the American Society of Civil Engineers.

== Abstracting and indexing ==
Journal of Bridge Engineering is abstracted and indexed in the following bibliographic databases:

- Aerospace Database
- Applied Science & Technology Source
- Aquatic Sciences and Fisheries Abstracts
- Civil Engineering Abstracts
- Communication Abstracts
- Compendex
- Computer & Applied Sciences
- DIALNET
- Environment Index
- INSPEC
- Metadex
- Science Citation Index Expanded
- Scopus
