= Journal of Transportation Engineering, Part B: Pavements =

Journal of American Society of Civil Engineers

- Language: English
- Edited by: Karim Chatti

Publication details
- Former names: Journal of Transportation Engineering, Part B: Pavements
- Publisher: American Society of Civil Engineers
- Frequency: Quarterly

Standard abbreviations
- ISO 4: J. Transp. Eng. B

Indexing
- CODEN: JPEODX
- ISSN: 2573-5438

Links
- Journal homepage

The Journal of Transportation Engineering, Part B: Pavements is a peer-reviewed scientific journal published by the American Society of Civil Engineers. It covers planning, design, construction, operation, and maintenance of airport, roadway and other pavement systems. Papers that cover pavement design, materials, modeling, performance, and environmental aspects are encouraged.

== History ==
The ASCE Journal of Transportation Engineering was split into two parts in 2017. Journal of Transportation Engineering, Part A: Systems covers road, bridge, and transit management; while Part B is devoted to all things pavement related.

== Indexes ==
The journal is indexed in Ei Compendex, ProQuest, Civil engineering database, INSPEC, Scopus, and EBSCOHost.
