= Environmental Fluid Mechanics =

- Discipline: Earth sciences
- Language: English
- Edited by: Harindra J. Fernando

Publication details
- History: 2001–present
- Publisher: Springer Science+Business Media
- Frequency: Bimonthly
- Open access: Hybrid
- License: CC BY 4.0 or CC BY-NC 4.0
- Impact factor: 1.846 (2014)

Standard abbreviations
- ISO 4: Environ. Fluid Mech.

Indexing
- CODEN: EFMNAA
- ISSN: 1567-7419 (print); 1573-1510 (web)
- OCLC no.: 46701832

Links
- Journal homepage; Online archive

Environmental Fluid Mechanics is a bimonthly peer-reviewed scientific journal on Earth sciences published by Springer Science+Business Media.

== Abstracting and indexing ==
The journal is abstracted and indexed in:

- Current Contents/Physical, Chemical & Earth Sciences
- GEOBASE
- INSPEC
- PASCAL
- Science Citation Index Expanded
- Scopus

According to the Journal Citation Reports, the journal has a 2018 impact factor of 1.846.
