= Journal of Structural Engineering =

- Language: English
- Edited by: John W. van de Lindt

Publication details
- Publisher: American Society of Civil Engineers
- Frequency: monthly
- Impact factor: 2.528 (2018)

Standard abbreviations
- ISO 4: J. Struct. Eng.

Indexing
- CODEN: JSENDH
- ISSN: 0733-9445 (print); 1943-541X (web)

Links
- Journal homepage

The Journal of Structural Engineering is the principal professional peer-reviewed journal of the American Society of Civil Engineers, the oldest professional civil engineering society in the United States. The journal is one of the flagship journals of the Society. It is sponsored by its division, the ASCE Structural Engineering Institute.

== Scope ==
This journal shares knowledge and advances in the field of structural engineering. Topics that are covered include structural modeling and design; analytical, computational and experimental simulation techniques; and discuss methods for maintaining, rehabilitating monitoring existing structures, sustainable structures, resilient infrastructure, and state-of-the-art / state-of-practice content.

== History ==
Originally, the journals was part of the proceedings of the American Society of Civil Engineers, first published in 1873 The Journal started publishing separately in 1956 as part of the ASCE Journal of the Structural Division (ISSN 0044-8001). In 1983, the title was changed to the Journal of Structural Engineering (ISSN 0733-9445).

Past Editors of the Journal include:

- John E. Bower: Vol. 107 No. 6 (1 Year 3 Months)
- Donald Mcdonald: Vol. 108 No. 10 (1 Year 11 Months)
- Thomas G. Williamson: Vol. 110 No. 10 (2 Years 1 Month)
- Alfredo H-S. Ang: Vol. 112 No. 11 (4 Years 1 Month)
- James T.P. Yao: Vol. 116 No. 12 (1 Year 10 Months)
- Vernon B. Watwood: Vol. 118 No. 11 (1 Year 11 Months)
- David Darwin: Vol. 120 No. 11 (5 Years 10 Months)
- C. Dale Buckner: Vol. 126 No. 10 (2 Years 11 Months)
- Sashi Kunnath: Vol. 129 No. 10 (7 Years)
- Sherif El-Tawil: Vol. 136 No. 10 (Present)

== Metrics ==
| Metric | 2018 |
|---|---|
| Impact Factor (2 year) | 2.528 |
| 5-year Impact Factor | 2.814 |
| Immediacy Index | 0.261 |
| CiteScore | 2.95 |
| Eigenfactor Score | 0.011 |
| Article Influence Score | 0.861 |
| h-index | 126 |
| SCImago Journal Rank | 1.91 |

== Indexes ==
The Journal of Structural Engineering is indexed in Scopus, Web of Science, and Engineering Index, Civil engineering database, OCLC (WorldCat). It is available on ProQuest and EbscoNet.
