= Journal of Engineering Mechanics =

- Discipline: Engineering
- Language: English
- Edited by: Franz-Josef Ulm

Publication details
- Former name: Journal of Engineering Mechanics
- History: 1875–present
- Publisher: American Society of Civil Engineers
- Frequency: Monthly
- Impact factor: 2.264 (2018)

Standard abbreviations
- ISO 4: J. Eng. Mech.

Indexing
- CODEN: JENMDT
- ISSN: 0733-9399 (print); 1943-7889 (web)

Links
- Journal homepage

The Journal of Engineering Mechanics is a peer-reviewed scientific journal published by the American Society of Civil Engineers, and covers activity and development in the field of applied mechanics as it relates to civil engineering. Published papers typically describe the development and implementation of new analytical models, innovative numerical methods, and novel experimental methods and results.

== Indexes ==
The journal is indexed in Google Scholar, Baidu, Elsevier (Ei Compendex), Clarivate Analytics (Web of Science), ProQuest, Civil engineering database, TRDI, OCLC (WorldCat), IET/INSPEC, Crossref, Scopus, and EBSCOHost.
