= Journal of Irrigation & Drainage Engineering =

Journal of Irrigation and Drainage Engineering
- Discipline: Civil engineering
- Language: English
- Edited by: David Arthur Chin

Publication details
- Former name(s): Journal of the Irrigation and Drainage Division
- History: 1956–present
- Publisher: American Society of Civil Engineers
- Frequency: Monthly
- Impact factor: 1.340 (2018)

Standard abbreviations
- ISO 4: J. Irrig. Drain. Eng.

Indexing
- CODEN: JIDEDH
- ISSN: 0733-9437 (print); 1943-4774 (web)

Links
- Journal homepage

The Journal of Irrigation and Drainage Engineering is a monthly peer-reviewed scientific journal published by the American Society of Civil Engineers covering irrigation engineering as a specialty area in agricultural engineering, and drainage engineering as a specialty area in civil engineering.

== History ==
The journal was established in 1956 as the Journal of the Irrigation and Drainage Division (1956-1982), obtaining its current name in 1983.

== Abstracting and indexing ==
The journal is abstracted and indexed in Ei Compendex, ProQuest databases, Civil Engineering Database, Inspec, Scopus, and EBSCO databases.
