= Journal of Environmental Engineering =

- Discipline: Environmental engineering
- Language: English
- Edited by: Dionysios D. Dionysiou

Publication details
- History: 1956–present
- Publisher: American Society of Civil Engineers (United States)
- Frequency: Monthly
- Impact factor: 1.657 (2018)

Standard abbreviations
- ISO 4: J. Environ. Eng. (N. Y.)
- NLM: J Environ Eng (New York)

Indexing
- CODEN: JOEEDU
- ISSN: 0733-9372 (print); 1943-7870 (web)

Links
- Journal homepage

The Journal of Environmental Engineering is a monthly engineering journal published by the American Society of Civil Engineers.

The main editor is Dionysios D. Dionysiou of University of Cincinnati.

The journal presents broad interdisciplinary information on the practice and status of research in environmental engineering science, systems engineering, and sanitation. Papers focus on engineering methods; impacts of wastewater collection and treatment; watershed contamination; environmental biology; nonpoint-source pollution on watersheds; air pollution and acid deposition; and solid waste management.

== History ==
As one of ASCE's flagship journals which began publication in 1956, this journal's origin goes back to the publication of the first volume of Transactions of the American Society of Civil Engineers in 1892. Established originally as Journal of the Sanitary Engineering Division and renamed Journal of the Environmental Engineering Division in 1973, it acquired its current name in 1983.

== Indexes ==
The journal is indexed in Google Scholar, Baidu, Elsevier (Ei Compendex), Clarivate Analytics (Web of Science), ProQuest, Civil engineering database, TRDI, OCLC (WorldCat), IET/INSPEC, Crossref, Scopus, and EBSCOHost.
