= Journal of Hydraulic Engineering =

- Language: English
- Edited by: Fabian Bombardelli

Publication details
- Former name(s): Journal of the Hydraulics Division
- Publisher: American Society of Civil Engineers
- Frequency: monthly
- Impact factor: 2.206 (2018)

Standard abbreviations
- ISO 4: J. Hydraul. Eng.

Indexing
- CODEN: JHEND8
- ISSN: 0733-9429 (print); 1943-7900 (web)

Links
- Journal homepage

The Journal of Hydraulic Engineering, formerly the Journal of the Hydraulics Division (1956–1982), is a peer-reviewed scientific journal published by the American Society of Civil Engineers. Topics range from flows in closed conduits to free-surface flows (canals, rivers, lakes, and estuaries) to environmental fluid dynamics. Topics include transport processes involving fluids (multiphase flows) such as sediment and contaminant transport, and heat and gas transfers. Emphasis is placed on the presentation of concepts, methods, techniques, and results that advance knowledge and/or are suitable for general application in the hydraulic engineering profession.

== History ==
One of ASCE's flagship journals which began publication in 1956, this journal's origin goes back to the publication of the first volume of Transactions of the American Society of Civil Engineers in 1892.

== Indexes ==
The journal is indexed in Google Scholar, Baidu, Elsevier (Ei Compendex), Clarivate Analytics (Web of Science), ProQuest, Civil engineering database, TRDI, OCLC (WorldCat), IET/INSPEC, Crossref, Scopus, and EBSCOHost.
