= ASCE-ASME Journal of Risk and Uncertainty in Engineering Systems =

ASCE-ASME Journal of Risk and Uncertainty in Engineering Systems, Part A
- Language: English
- Edited by: Michael Beer

Publication details
- History: 2014–present
- Publisher: American Society of Civil Engineers
- Frequency: Quarterly

Standard abbreviations
- ISO 4: ASCE-ASME J. Risk Uncertain. Eng. Syst. A

Indexing
- ISSN: 2376-7642

Links
- Journal homepage

ASCE-ASME Journal of Risk and Uncertainty in Engineering Systems, Part B
- Language: English
- Edited by: Michael Beer

Publication details
- History: 2014–present
- Publisher: American Society of Mechanical Engineers
- Frequency: Quarterly

Standard abbreviations
- ISO 4: ASCE-ASME J. Risk Uncertain. Eng. Syst. B

Indexing
- ISSN: 2332-9017 (print); 2332-9025 (web)

Links
- Journal homepage

The ASCE-ASME Journal of Risk and Uncertainty in Engineering Systems is a peer-reviewed scientific journal established in 2014 by the American Society of Civil Engineers (ASCE) and the American Society of Mechanical Engineers (ASME). It disseminates research findings, best practices concerns, and discussions and debates on risk- and uncertainty-related issues in the areas of civil and mechanical engineering and related fields.

== Scope ==
The journal covers risk and uncertainty issues in planning, design, construction/manufacturing, utilization, decommissioning and removal, and evaluation of engineering systems. The journal has wide coverage to all sub-disciplines of civil and mechanical engineering and other related fields, including structural engineering, geotechnical engineering, water resources engineering, construction engineering, transport engineering, coastal engineering, nuclear engineering, industrial and manufacturing engineering including gas, oil and chemical, ocean engineering, hazard analysis including climate change, earthquake engineering, associated resilience and sustainability, mechanics, mechatronics, robotics, thermodynamics, human factors, and thermo science.

== History ==
Professor Bilal M. Ayyub from the Department of Civil and Environmental Engineering, University of Maryland College Park, established the ASCE-ASME Journal of Risk and Uncertainty in Engineering Systems in 2014 in coordination and consultation with an advisory board representing leaders from ASCE and ASME, with the first issue being published in March 2015. As of 2018, it is the only joint journal for both societies with another society in their respective long histories. ASCE and ASME registered the two parts as separate journals as Part A and Part B, respectively, to facilitate the production of the journal along other journals offered by the respective societies. Both journals have the same editorial board and leadership and produced their first quarterly issues at the end of first quarter of 2015. The current editor-in-chief of the two journals is Professor Michael Beer.

== Indexes ==
Both Part A and Part B are listed in the Emerging Sources Citation Index by Clarivate Analytics, formerly Thomson Reuters, and it is eligible for indexing in 2018. From 2016 onward, all articles are included in Web of Science. They are included also in Scopus. The current Impact Factor of Part A is 2.4, for Part B it's 2.1. based on the latest Journal Citation Reports released by Clarivate Analytics.
