= Journal of Water Resources Planning and Management =

- Discipline: Water resources
- Language: English
- Edited by: Meghna Babbar-Sebens

Publication details
- History: 1993-present
- Publisher: American Society of Civil Engineers (United States)
- Frequency: Monthly
- Impact factor: 3.537 (2016)

Standard abbreviations
- ISO 4: J. Water Resour. Plan. Manag.

Indexing
- CODEN: JWRMD5
- ISSN: 0733-9496 (print); 1943-5452 (web)

Links
- Journal homepage

The Journal of Water Resources Planning and Management is a monthly scientific journal of engineering published by the American Society of Civil Engineers since 1943. The journal covers the development of methods, theories, and applications to current administrative, economic, engineering, planning, and social issues as they apply to water resources management. It publishes papers on analytical, experimental, and numerical methods with regard to the investigation of physical or conceptual models related to these issues. It also publishes technical notes, book reviews, and forum discussions. The journal requires the use of the metric system, but allows authors to also submit their papers in other systems of measure in addition to the SI system.

The current editor in chief is Meghna Babbar-Sebens (Oregon State University).
