= Civil Engineering Database =

The Civil Engineering Database (CEDB) was created in 1994, and is maintained by American Society of Civil Engineers (ASCE). It is a free bibliographic database, containing 270,000-entries, for all ASCE publications including journals, conference proceedings, books, standards, manuals, magazines, and newspapers on all the disciplines of civil engineering. The coverage dates back to 1872.

== See also ==
- List of academic databases and search engines
