= American Society of Civil Engineers =

US professional association

- Abbreviation: ASCE
- Founded: November 5, 1852; 174 years ago
- Type: Engineering society
- Purpose: Purpose of the group is the advancement of the science and profession of Civil engineering and the enhancement of human welfare through the activities of society members.
- Location: Reston, Virginia, United States
- Region served: Worldwide
- Method: Industry standards, conferences, publications
- Members: ~164,000 (2025)
- Official language: English
- President: Carol Ellinger Haddock, P.E. (2027)
- Past President: Marsha Anderson Bomar, Ph.D. (2026)
- President-elect: Rossana D'Antonio, P.E., GE, F.ASCE (2028)
- Chief Executive Officer: Peter J. O'Neil
- Revenue: US $49.4 million (2022)
- Endowment: US $29.2 million (2022)
- Employees: 250
- Website: asce.org

The American Society of Civil Engineers (ASCE) is a tax-exempt professional body founded in 1852 to represent members of the civil engineering profession worldwide. Headquartered in Reston, Virginia, it is the oldest national engineering society in the United States. Its constitution was based on the older Boston Society of Civil Engineers from 1848.

ASCE is dedicated to the advancement of the science and profession of civil engineering and the enhancement of human welfare through the activities of society members. It has more than 143,000 members in 177 countries. Its mission is to provide essential value to members, their careers, partners, and the public; facilitate the advancement of technology; encourage and provide the tools for lifelong learning; promote professionalism and the profession; develop and support civil engineers.

== History ==
The first serious and documented attempts to organize civil engineers as a professional society in the newly created United States were in the early 19th century. In 1828, John Kilbourn of Ohio managed a short-lived "Civil Engineering Journal," editorializing about the recent incorporation of the Institution of Civil Engineers in Great Britain that same year, Kilbourn suggested that the American corps of engineers could constitute an American society of civil engineers. Later, in 1834, an American trade periodical, the "American Railroad Journal," advocated for a similar national organization of civil engineers.

=== Institution of American Civil Engineers ===
On December 17, 1838, a petition started circulating asking civil engineers to meet in 1839 in Baltimore, Maryland, to organize a permanent society of civil engineers. Prior to that, thirteen notable civil engineers largely identifiable as being from New York, Pennsylvania, or Maryland met in Philadelphia. This group presented the Franklin Institute of Philadelphia with a formal proposal that an Institution of American Civil Engineers be established as an adjunct of the Franklin..." Some of them were:

- Benjamin Wright. In 1969, the American Society of Civil Engineers declared Wright to be the 'Father of American Civil Engineering'.
- William Strickland
- Pennsylvanians Edward Miller and Solomon. W. Roberts, the latter being Chief Engineer for the Allegheny Portage railroad, the first crossing of the Allegheny mountains (1831–1834)

Forty engineers actually appeared at the February 1839 meeting in Baltimore, including J. Edgar Thomson (Future Chief Engineer and later President of the Pennsylvania Railroad), Wright, Roberts, Edward Miller, and the Maryland engineers Isaac Trimble and Benjamin Henry Latrobe II and attendees from as far as Massachusetts, Illinois, and Louisiana. Subsequently, a group met again in Philadelphia, led by its Secretary, Edward Miller to take steps to formalize the society, participants now included such other notable engineers as:

- John B. Jervis
- Claudius Crozet
- William Gibbs McNeill
- George Washington Whistler
- Walter Gwynn
- J. Edgar Thompson
- Sylvester Welch, brother of future ASCE president Ashbel Welch
- Jonathan Knight
- Benjamin Henry Latrobe II
- Moncure Robinson.

Miller drafted a proposed constitution that defined society's purpose as "the collection and diffusion of professional knowledge, the advancement of mechanical philosophy, and the elevation of the character and standing of the Civil Engineers of the United States." Membership in the new society restricted membership to engineers, and "architects and eminent machinists were to be admitted only as Associates." The proposed constitution failed, and no further attempts were made to form another society. Miller later ascribed the failure to the difficulties of assembling members due to available means for traveling in the country at the time. One of the other difficulties members would have to contend with was the requirement to produce each year one previously unpublished paper or "...present a scientific book, map, plan or model, not already in the possession of the Society, under the penalty of $10." In that same period, the editor of the American Railroad Journal commented that effort had failed in part due to certain jealousies that arose due to the proposed affiliation with the Franklin Institute. That journal continued discussion on forming an engineers' organization from 1839 thru 1843 serving its own self-interests in advocating its journal as a replacement for a professional society but to no avail.

=== The American Society of Civil Engineers and Architects ===
During the 1840s, professional organizations continued to develop and organize in the United States. The organizers' motives were largely to "improve common standards, foster research, and disseminate knowledge through meetings and publications." Unlike earlier associations such as the American Philosophical Society, these newer associations were not seeking to limit membership as much as pursue "more specialized interests." Examples of this surge in new professional organizations in America were the American Statistical Association (1839), American Ethnological Society (1842), American Medical Association (1847), American Association for the Advancement of Science, (1848) and National Education Association (1852).

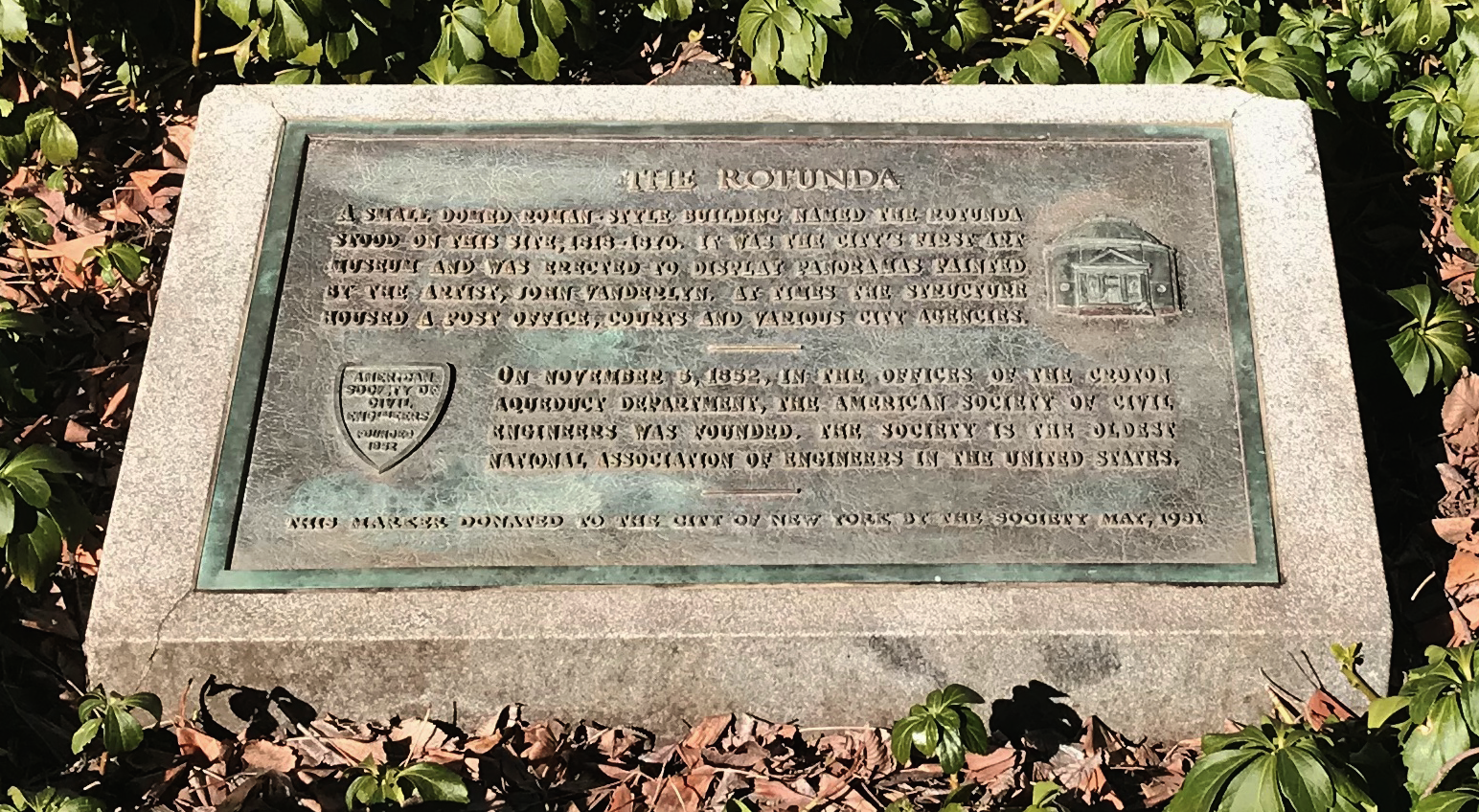
Plaque at the former site of the Rotunda, where ASCE was founded

During this same period of association incorporations in the 1840s, attempts were again made at organizing an American engineer association. They succeeded at first with the Boston Society of Civil Engineers, organized in 1848, and then in October 1852, with an effort to organize a Society of Civil Engineers and Architects in New York. Led by Alfred W. Craven, Chief Engineer of the Croton Aqueduct and future ASCE president, the meeting resolved to incorporate the society under the name "American Society of Civil Engineers And Architects". The founding meeting was held on November 5, 1852, in the offices of the Croton Aqueduct Department at the Rotunda in City Hall Park, Manhattan. Membership eligibility was restricted to "civil, geological, mining and mechanical Engineers, architects, and other persons who, by profession, are interested in the advancement of science." James Laurie was elected the society's first president. At an early meeting of the Board of Direction in 1852, instructions were given for the incorporation of the "American Society of Civil Engineers and Architects" but this was the proper steps were never taken, and therefore this name never legally belonged to the association. The ASCE held its first meetings at the Croton Aqueduct Department building in City Hall Park. The meetings only went through 1855 and with the advent of the American Civil War, the society suspended its activities.

=== Late 19th century ===
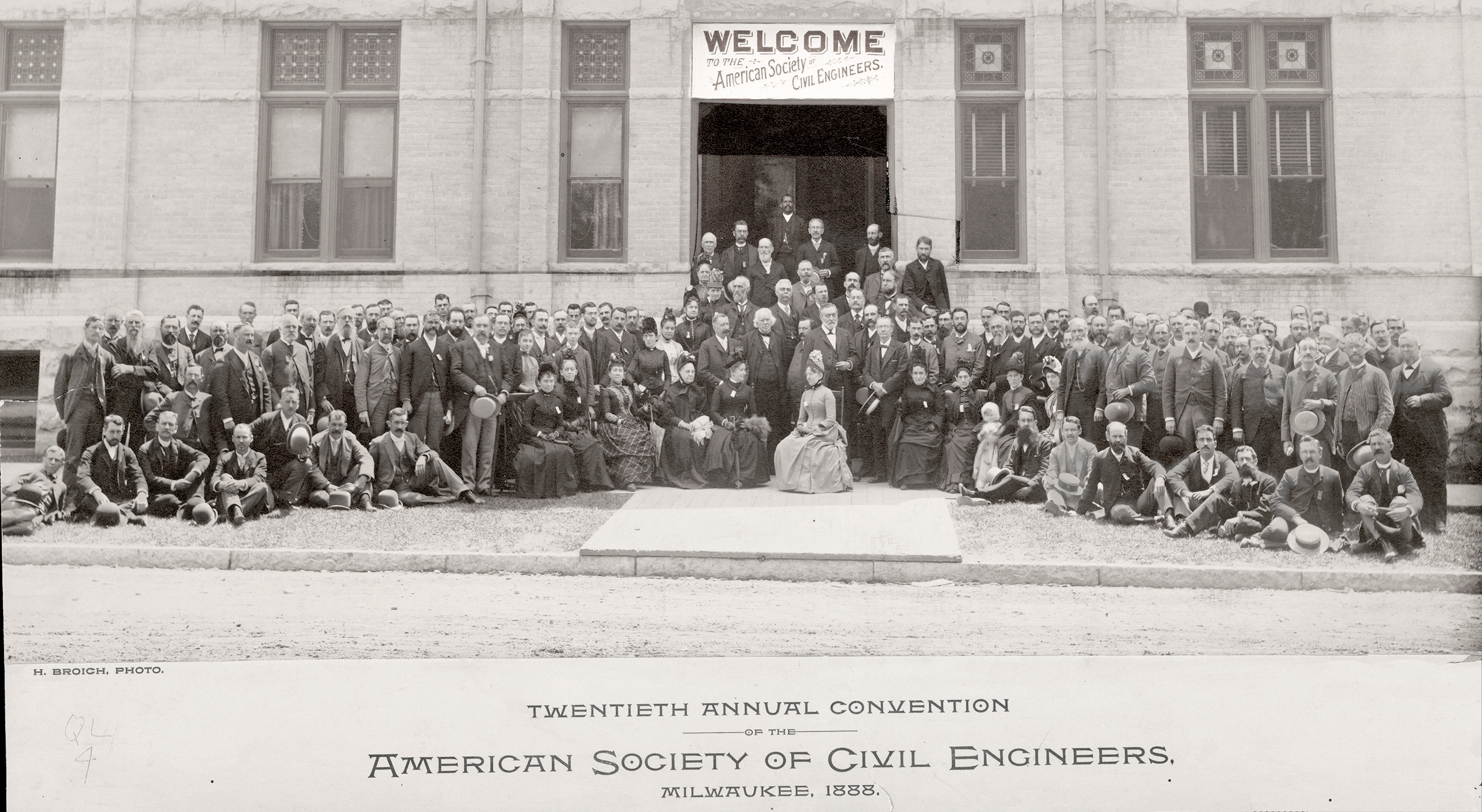
1888 American Society of Civil Engineers at their 20th annual meeting at the Athenaeum building in Milwaukee, Wisconsin

The next meeting was more than twelve years later in 1867. A number of the original founders, such as James Laurie, J.W. Adams, C. W. Copeland, and W. H. Talcott, were at this meeting and were dedicated to the objective of resuscitating the society. They also planned to put the society on a more permanent footing and elect fifty-four new members. With success in that effort, the young engineering society passed a resolution noting that its preservation was mainly due to the persevering efforts of its first president, James Laurie. The address of President James Pugh Kirkwood delivered at that meeting in 1867 was the first publication of the society, appearing in Volume 1 of Transactions, bearing date of 1872.

On March 4, 1868, by a vote of 17 to 4, the name was changed to "American Society of Civil Engineers", but it was not until April 17, 1877, that the lack of incorporation was discovered and the proper steps taken to remedy the defect. The society was then chartered and incorporated in New York state.

The reconvened ASCE met at the Chamber of Commerce of the State of New York until 1875 when the society moved to 4 East 23rd Street. The ASCE moved again in 1877 to 104 East 20th Street and in 1881 to 127 East 23rd Street. The ASCE commissioned a new headquarters at 220 West 57th Street in 1895. The building was completed in 1897 and served as the society's headquarters until 1917 when the ASCE moved to the Engineering Societies' Building.

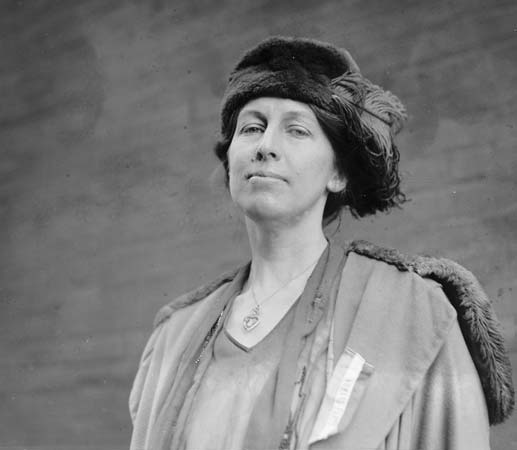
Nora Stanton Blatch Barney 1921

=== 20th century ===
Nora Stanton Barney was among the first women in the United States to earn a civil engineering degree, graduating from Cornell University in 1905. In the same year, she was accepted as a junior member of the organization and began work for the New York City Board of Water Supply. She was the first female member of ASCE, where she was allowed to be a junior member, but was denied advancement to associate member in 1916 because of her gender. In 2015, she was posthumously advanced to ASCE Fellow status.

ASCE's headquarters relocated to the Engineering Societies' Building in 1917; additional floors were added on top of the building to accommodate the society's new offices. The weight of the extra stories could not be supported on the existing pilings, so four new steel columns were constructed through the structure, supported directly on the bedrock. In 1961, ASCE's headquarters moved from the Engineering Societies' Building to the United Engineering Center, a new skyscraper built for twenty different engineering societies across from the headquarters of the United Nations. In 1996, ASCE relocated its headquarters from New York City to Reston, Virginia. The relocation to the Washington metropolitan area was made to bring ASCE's headquarters closer to the legislative branch of the federal government and also reduced operating costs.

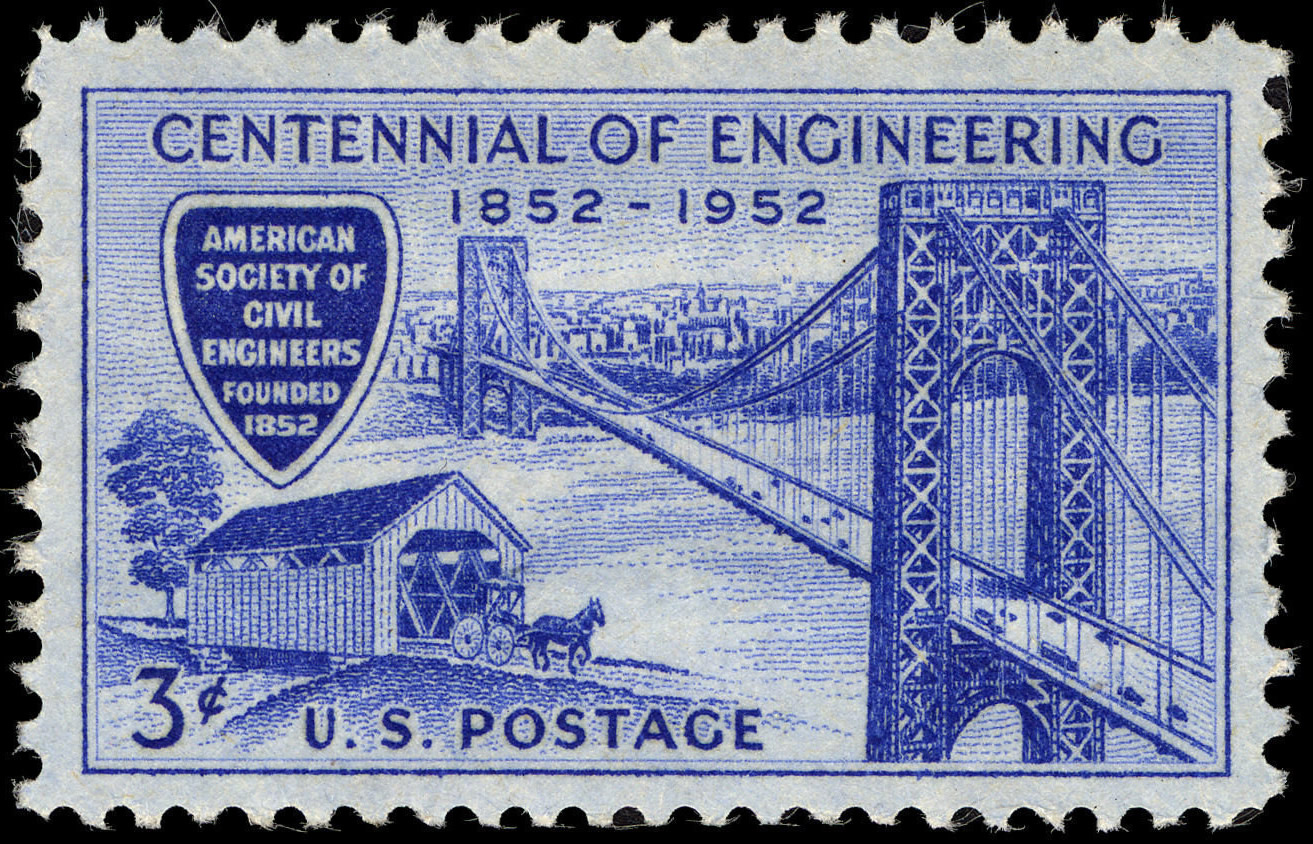
U.S. stamp commemorating the 100th anniversary of the ASCE in 1952

In 1999, the ASCE elected the top-ten "civil engineering achievements that had the greatest positive impact on life in the 20th century" in "broad categories". Monuments of the Millennium were a "combination of technical engineering achievement, courage and inspiration, and a dramatic influence on the development of [their] communities". The achievements and monuments that best exemplified them included:

- Airport design and development – the Kansai International Airport in Osaka, Japan
- Dams – the Hoover Dam on the Colorado River in the United States
- Interstate Highway System – "the system overall"
- Long-span bridges – like the Golden Gate Bridge in San Francisco, California
- Rail transportation – as exemplified by the Eurotunnel rail system connecting the UK and France
- Sanitary landfills and solid waste disposal – "sanitary waste disposal advances overall"
- Skyscrapers – the Empire State Building in Midtown Manhattan, New York City
- Wastewater treatment – the Chicago wastewater system
- Water supply and distribution – the California State Water Project
- Water transportation – the Panama Canal

== Overview ==
ASCE's mission is to deliver essential value to "its members, their careers, our partners, and the public" as well as enable "the advancement of technology, encourage and provide the tools for lifelong learning, promote professionalism and the profession." The society also seeks to "develop and support civil engineer leaders, and advocate infrastructure and environmental stewardship." The society as an exempt organization in the United States (Section 501(c)(3)) was required to reported its program service accomplishments and related expenses and revenues.

=== Publications ===
ASCE stated that dissemination of technical and professional information to the civil engineering profession was a major goal of the society. This is accomplished through a variety of publications and information products, including 35 technical and professional journals amongst them:

- ASCE Journal of Structural Engineering
- Journal of Environmental Engineering
- Journal of Hydraulic Engineering
- Journal of Hydrologic Engineering
- Journal of Transportation Engineering, Part A: Systems
- Journal of Transportation Engineering, Part B: Pavements
- Journal of Water Resources Planning and Management
- Civil Engineering, the society's monthly magazine

They also publish an online bibliographic database, conference proceedings, standards, manuals of practice, and technical reports.

The ASCE Library contains 470+ e-books and standards, some with chapter-level access and no restrictive DRM, and 600+ online proceedings.

=== Conferences, meetings, and education ===
Each year, more than 55,000 engineers earn continuing education units (CEUs) and/or professional development hours (PDHs) by participating in ASCE's continuing education programs. ASCE hosts more than 15 annual and specialty conferences, over 200 continuing education seminars and more than 300 live web seminars. Meetings include "...committees, task forces, focus groups, workshops and seminars designed to bring together civil engineering experts either from specific fields or those with a broad range of experience and skills. These meetings deal with specific topics and issues facing civil engineers such as America's failing infrastructure, sustainability, earthquakes, and bridge collapses."

=== Engineering programs ===
The engineering programs division directly advances the science of engineering by delivering technical content for ASCE's publications, conferences and continuing education programs. It consists of eight discipline-specific institutes, four technical divisions, and six technical councils. The work is accomplished by over 600 technical committees with editorial responsibility for 28 of ASCE's 33 journals. On an annual basis, the division conducts more than twelve congresses and specialty conferences. As a founding society of ANSI and accredited standards development organization, ASCE committees use an established and audited process to produce consensus standards under a program supervised by the society's Codes and Standards Committee.

Civil Engineering Certification Inc. (CEC), affiliated with ASCE, has been established to support specialty certification academies for civil engineering specialties and is accredited by the Council of Engineering and Scientific Specialty Boards (CESB). CEC also handles safety certification for state, municipal, and federal buildings, formerly the province of the now-defunct Building Security Council. The Committee on Critical Infrastructure (CCI) provides vision and guidance on ASCE activities related to critical infrastructure resilience, including planning, design, construction, O&M, and event mitigation, response and recovery.

Certification is the recognition of attaining advanced knowledge and skills in a specialty area of civil engineering. ASCE offers certifications for engineers who demonstrate advanced knowledge and skills in their area of engineering.

- American Academy of Water Resources Engineers (AAWRE)
- Academy of Geo-Professionals (AGP)
- Academy of Coastal, Ocean, Port & Navigation Engineers (ACOPNE)

== Awards and designations ==
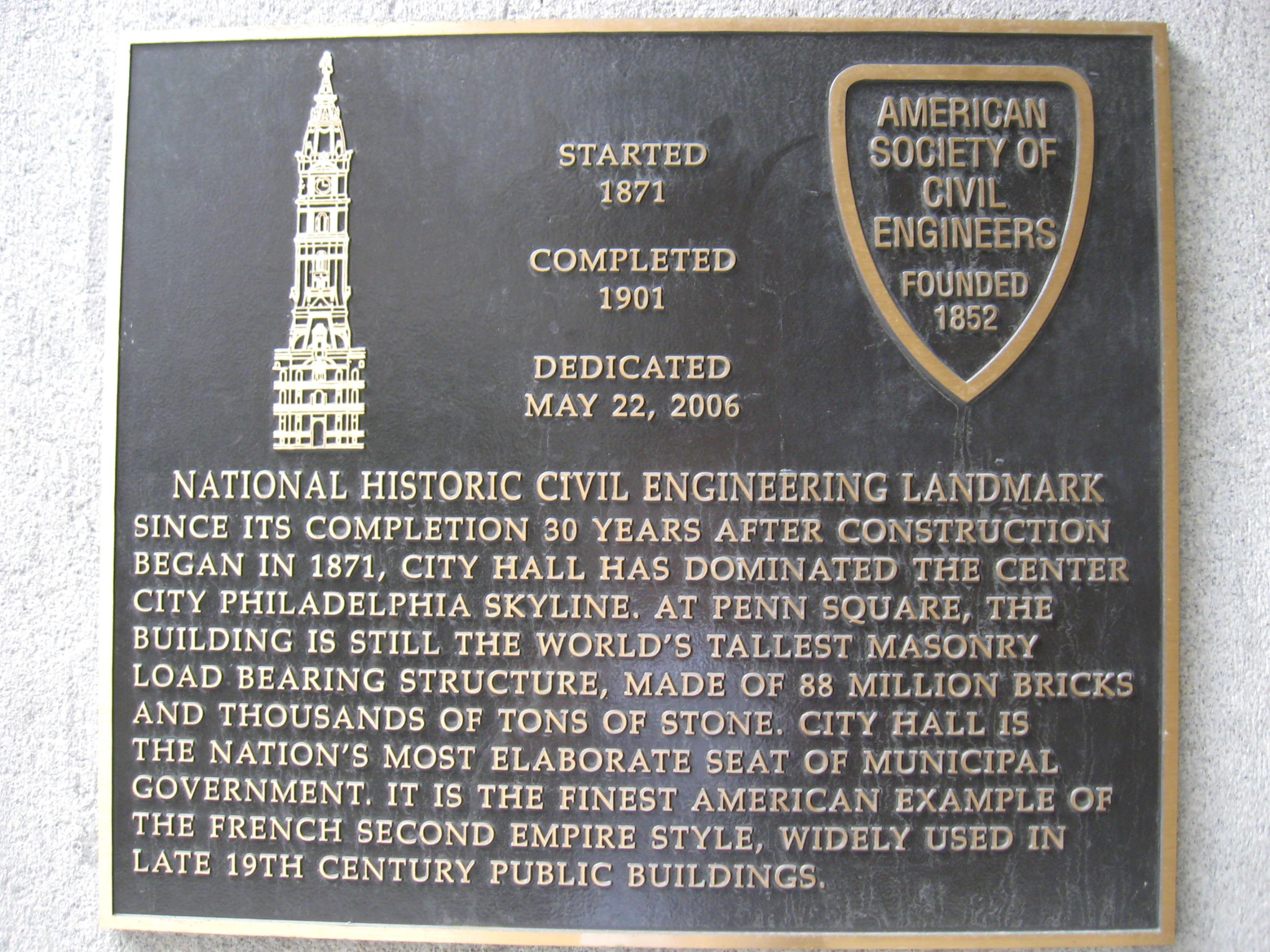
ASCE Historical Marker at Philadelphia City Hall.

ASCE honors civil engineers through many Society Awards including the Norman medal (1874), Wellington prize (1921), Huber Civil Engineering Research Prize, the Outstanding Projects and Leaders (OPAL) awards in the categories of construction, design, education, government and management, the Outstanding Civil Engineering Achievement (OCEA) for projects, the Henry L. Michel Award for Industry Advancement of Research and the Charles Pankow Award for innovation, 12 scholarships and fellowships for student members. Created in 1968 by ASCE's Sanitary Engineering Division, the Wesley W. Horner award is named after former ASCE President Wesley W. Horner, and given to a recently peer reviewed published paper in the fields of hydrology, urban drainage, or sewerage. Special consideration is given to private practice engineering work that is recognized as a valuable contribution to the field of environmental engineering. The Lifetime Achievement Award has been presented annually since 1999 and recognizes five different individual leaders. One award is present in each category of design, construction, government, education, and management.

=== Walter L. Huber Civil Engineering Research Prize ===
In July 1946, the Board of Direction authorized annual awards on recommendation by the society's Committee on Research to stimulate research in civil engineering. In October 1964, Mrs. Alberta Reed Huber endowed these prizes in honor of her husband, Walter L. Huber, past president, ASCE. The Huber Prize is considered the highest level mid-career research prize in civil engineering and is awarded for outstanding achievements and contributions in research with respect to all disciplines of civil engineering.

=== LTPP International Data Analysis Contest Award ===
The LTPP International Data Analysis Contest is an annual data analysis contest held by the ASCE in collaboration with the Federal Highway Administration (FHWA). The participants utilize Long-Term Pavement Performance Program (LTPP) data as part of their analysis.

=== Nathan M. Newmark Medal ===
At the instigation of the former students of Nathan Mortimore Newmark, the Nathan M. Newmark Medal was established in 1975 by the Engineering Mechanics Institute and Structural Engineering Institute of the American Society of Civil Engineers (ASCE) in honor of his contributions in structural engineering and mechanics. The medal is given to an ASCE member whose outstanding contributions in structural mechanics have substantially strengthened the scientific base of structural engineering, documented in the form of papers or other written presentations. Nominations are made once a year and due on November 1.

=== Columbia Medal ===
Creation of the ASCE Columbia Medal began in 1982, "...to commemorate the first earth orbital flight of the United States Space-Shuttle Orbiter, Columbia" and is awarded for "...sustained outstanding contribution to the advancement of aerospace engineering, sciences and technology..."

== ASCE Foundation ==
The ASCE Foundation is a charitable foundation established in 1994 to support and promote civil engineering programs that "... enhance quality of life, promote the profession, advance technical practices, and prepare civil engineers for tomorrow." It is incorporated separately from the ASCE, although it has a close relationship to it and all the foundation's personnel are employees of ASCE. The foundation board of directors has seven persons and its bylaws require that four of the seven directors must be ASCE officers as well and the ASCE executive director and chief financial officer must also be ASCE employees. The foundation's support is most often to ASCE's charitable, educational and scientific programs. The foundation's largest program is supporting three strategic areas; lifelong learning and leadership, advocacy for infrastructure investment and the role of civil engineers in sustainable practices. In 2014, this foundation's support in these areas was almost US$4 million.

== Criticisms and historical controversies ==
=== Controversies in New Orleans levee investigations ===
==== Press release of expert review panel 2007 ====
ASCE provides peer reviews at the request of public agencies and projects as a "means to improve the management and quality of [public agency] services and thus better protect the public health and safety with which they are entrusted". After the 2005 levee failures in Greater New Orleans, the commander of the U.S. Army Corps of Engineers (Lt Gen Carl Strock P.E., M.ASCE) requested that ASCE create an expert review panel to peer review the corps-sponsored Interagency Performance Evaluation Task Force, the body commissioned by the corps to assess the performance of the hurricane protection system in metro New Orleans. Lawrence Roth, deputy executive director of the ASCE led the ERP development, served as the panel's chief of staff and facilitated its interaction with IPET. The expert panel's role was to provide an independent technical review of the IPET's activities and findings, as stated at a National Research Council meeting in New Orleans: "an independent review panel ensure[s] that the outcome is a robust, credible and defensible performance evaluation". On February 12, 2007, Lt. Gen Strock gave all expert review panel members an Outstanding Civilian Service Medals.

On June 1, 2007, the ASCE issued its expert review panel report, and an accompanying press release. The press release was considered controversial because it contained information not present in the report, conflicting with the report, and minimized the Army Corps' involvement in the catastrophe: "Even without breaching, Hurricane Katrina's rainfall and surge overtopping would have caused extensive and severe flooding—and the worst loss of life and property loss ever experienced in New Orleans." The report stated that had levees and pump stations not failed, "far less property loss would have occurred and nearly two-thirds of deaths could have been avoided." The ASCE administration was criticized by the Times-Picayune for an attempt to minimize and understate the role of the Army Corps in the flooding.

==== Ethics complaint ====
In October 2007, Raymond Seed, a University of California-Berkeley civil engineering professor and ASCE member, submitted a 42-page ethics complaint to the ASCE alleging that the corps of engineers with ASCE's help sought to minimize the corps' mistakes in the flooding, intimidate anyone who tried to intervene, and delay the final results until the public's attention had turned elsewhere. The corps acknowledged receiving a copy of the letter and refused to comment until the ASCE's Committee on Professional Conduct (CPC) had commented on the complaint. It took over a year for the ASCE to announce the results of the CPC. The ASCE self-study panel did not file charges of ethical misconduct and blamed errors on "staff" and not review panel members having created the June press release."

==== Review panels to examine alleged ethics breaches ====
On November 14, 2007, ASCE announced that U.S. Congressman Sherwood Boehlert, R‑N.Y. (ret), would lead an independent task force of outside experts to review how ASCE participated in engineering studies of national significance. ASCE President David Mongan said the review was to address criticism of ASCE´s role in assisting the Army Corps of Engineers-sponsored investigation of Katrina failures. Mongan assured citizens of metro New Orleans in a letter to the Times Picayune, that ASCE took "this matter very seriously and that appropriate actions are being taken".

The panel recommended in results released on September 12, 2008, that ASCE should immediately take steps to remove the potential for conflict of interest in its participation in post-disaster engineering studies. The most important recommendations were that peer review funds over $1 million should come from a separate source, like the National Institute of Standards and Technology (NIST), that ASCE should facilitate but not control the assessment teams, and that information to the public and press should be disseminated not under the extremely tight controls that Ray Seed and his team experienced. It concluded that ASCE should draw up an ethics policy to eliminate questions of possible conflicts of interest.

On April 6, 2009, an internal probe with the ASCE issued a report that ordered a retraction of the ASCE's June 1, 2007, press release. The panel determined that the press release had "inadvertently conveyed a misleading impression regarding the role of engineering failures in the devastation of New Orleans", that it incorrectly said that surge levels along Mississippi's coastline were higher than water levels caused by a tsunami in the Indian Ocean in 2004, and that it had incorrectly repeated estimates of deaths and property damage in New Orleans that might have occurred if levees and floodwalls had not been breached.

==== Grassroots group spoof of ASCE–USACE relationship ====
On November 5, 2007, New Orleans–based grassroots group Levees.org led by Sandy Rosenthal criticized the ASCE's close relationship with the United States Army Corps of Engineers in a spoof online public service announcement. On November 12, 2007, the ASCE asked Levees.org to remove the video from the internet, threatening the organization with legal action if it did not comply. On November 13, the Times-Picayune posted the video on its website. Flanked by lawyers with Adams and Reese in the presence of extensive media coverage, the group ignored the threat and posted the video to YouTube citing Louisiana's Anti-SLAPP statute, a "strategic lawsuit against public participation", which allows courts to weed out lawsuits designed to chill public participation on matters of public significance. In a response for comment, ASCE President Mongan replied, "Since the video has already been widely reposted by other organizations, moving forward, we feel our time and expertise are best utilized working to help protect the residents of New Orleans from future storms and flooding."

==== USACE grant money for disinformation, 2008 ====
In March 2008, Levees.org announced that records obtained under the Freedom of Information Act revealed that as early October 2005, the Army Corps of Engineers had directed and later paid the ASCE more than $1.1 million for its peer review (Grant Number: W912HZ-06-1-0001). The grant also paid for a series of misleading ASCE presentations attempting to shift blame away from the corps and onto local levee officials. Members of the ASCE are forbidden from making false or exaggerated statements and also from making statements for an interested party unless this is disclosed. Levees.org claimed the records showed how the external peer review would be done in four phases: Phase 1 was research and analysis on the performance of the levees, floodwalls and other important structures. Phase 2 was provision of information on the current system to prevent future flooding. Phase 3 was provision of information to evaluate alternative approaches to flood protection. Phase 4 was transfer information and knowledge gained to a broader audience within Corps and its consultancy community to communicate lessons learned. The group claimed that these records were proof that ASCE's routine powerpoint presentation from 2007 and 2008 were a public relations campaign to repair the corps' reputation. ASCE officials responded that ASCE paid for the powerpoint presentations itself and had not used USACE grant money for that purpose.

== See also ==
- ASCE Library – online database of civil engineering journals, proceedings, e-books, and standards published by the society
- List of Historic Civil Engineering Landmarks – landmarks designated by the ASCE
