= List of mining journals =

This is a list of mining journals which includes publications that focus on mining, metallurgy, geology, and related extractive industries.

== Journals ==
- AAPG Bulletin
- Acta Geotechnica
- Acta Geotechnica Slovenica
- Bulletin of Engineering Geology and the Environment
- Canadian Geotechnical Journal
- Economic Geology
- Engineering Geology
- Géotechnique
- International Journal of Geomechanics
- International Journal of Rock Mechanics and Mining Sciences
- Journal of Mining and Metallurgy, Section B
- Journal of Mining Science
- Metallurgical and Materials Transactions
- Mining Magazine
- Oil & Gas Journal
- Oil Shale
- Petroleum Geoscience
- Petroleum Review
- Quarterly Journal of Engineering Geology & Hydrogeology
- Queensland Government Mining Journal

== See also ==
- Trade magazines
  - Boletín Minero
  - Light Metal Age
  - Mining Engineering
  - The Mining Journal
- Mining engineering
- Metallurgical engineering
- Geological engineering
- Geotechnical engineering
- Institute of Materials, Minerals and Mining
- List of geological modelling software
- List of geology journals
- List of scientific journals
- Petroleum engineering
- New drilling technologies – Plasma deep drilling technology, hydrothermal spallation, hydraulic mining, laser drilling, Gyrotron.
- Society of Petroleum Engineers
- National Mining Society
