= Geological engineering =

Discipline applying geological science

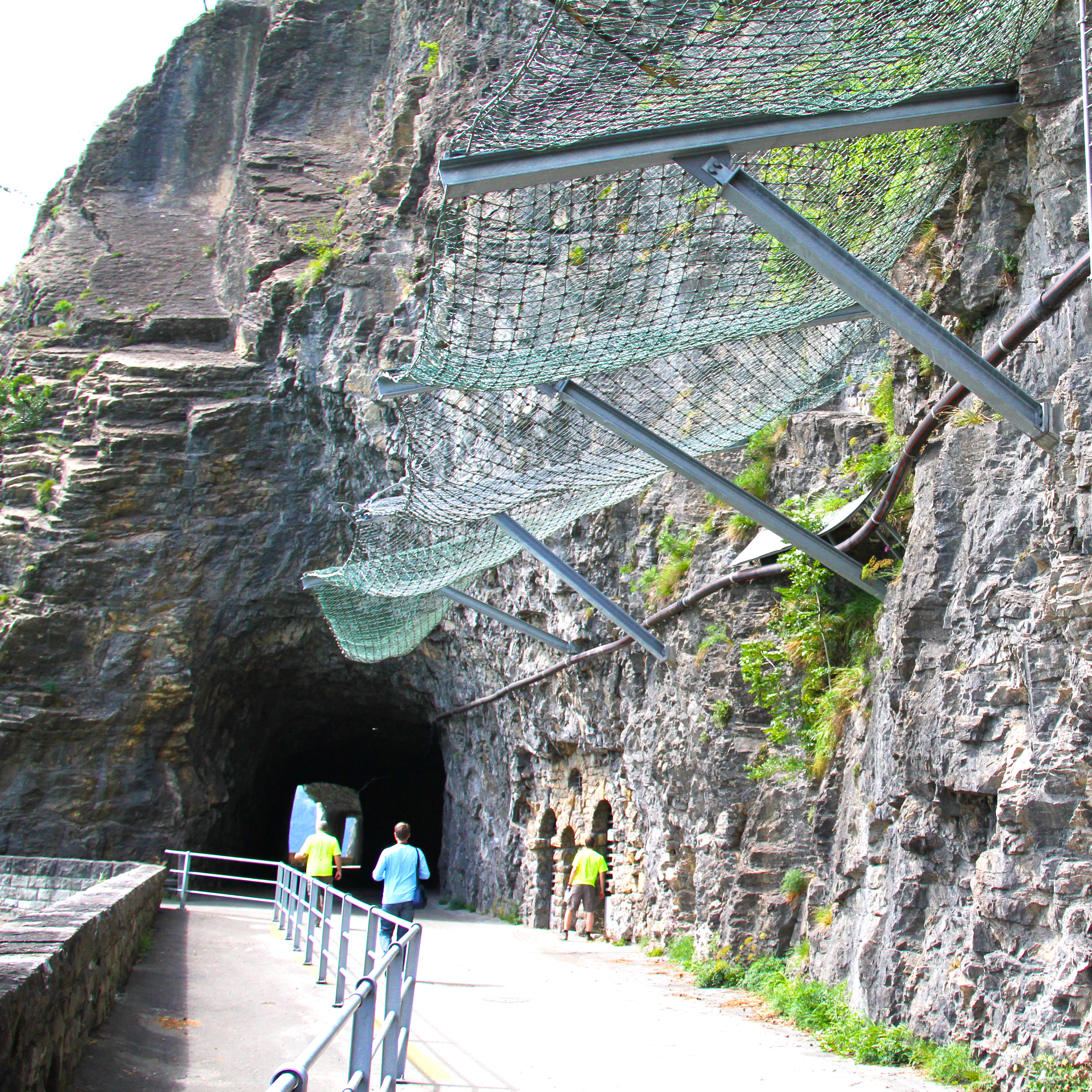
Example of infrastructure engineering (tunnel) and natural hazard engineering (rockfall protection), two subdisciplines of geological engineering.

Geological engineering is a discipline of engineering concerned with the application of geological science and engineering principles to fields, such as civil engineering, mining, environmental engineering, and forestry, among others. The work of geological engineers often directs or supports the work of other engineering disciplines such as assessing the suitability of locations for civil engineering, environmental engineering, mining operations, and oil and gas projects by conducting geological, geoenvironmental, geophysical, and geotechnical studies.

They are involved with impact studies for facilities and operations that affect surface and subsurface environments. The engineering design input and other recommendations made by geological engineers on these projects will often have a large impact on construction and operations. Geological engineers plan, design, and implement geotechnical, geological, geophysical, hydrogeological, and environmental data acquisition. This ranges from manual ground-based methods to deep drilling, to geochemical sampling, to advanced geophysical techniques and satellite surveying.

Geological engineers are also concerned with the analysis of past and future ground behaviour, mapping at all scales, and ground characterization programs for specific engineering requirements. These analyses lead geological engineers to make recommendations and prepare reports which could have major effects on the foundations of construction, mining, and civil engineering projects.

Some examples of projects include rock excavation, building foundation consolidation, pressure grouting, hydraulic channel erosion control, slope and fill stabilization, landslide risk assessment, groundwater monitoring, and assessment and remediation of contamination. In addition, geological engineers are included on design teams that develop solutions to surface hazards, groundwater remediation, underground and surface excavation projects, and resource management. Like mining engineers, geological engineers also conduct resource exploration campaigns, mine evaluation and feasibility assessments, and contribute to the ongoing efficiency, sustainability, and safety of active mining projects.

== History ==
While the term geological engineering was not coined until the 19th century, principles of geological engineering are demonstrated through millennia of human history.

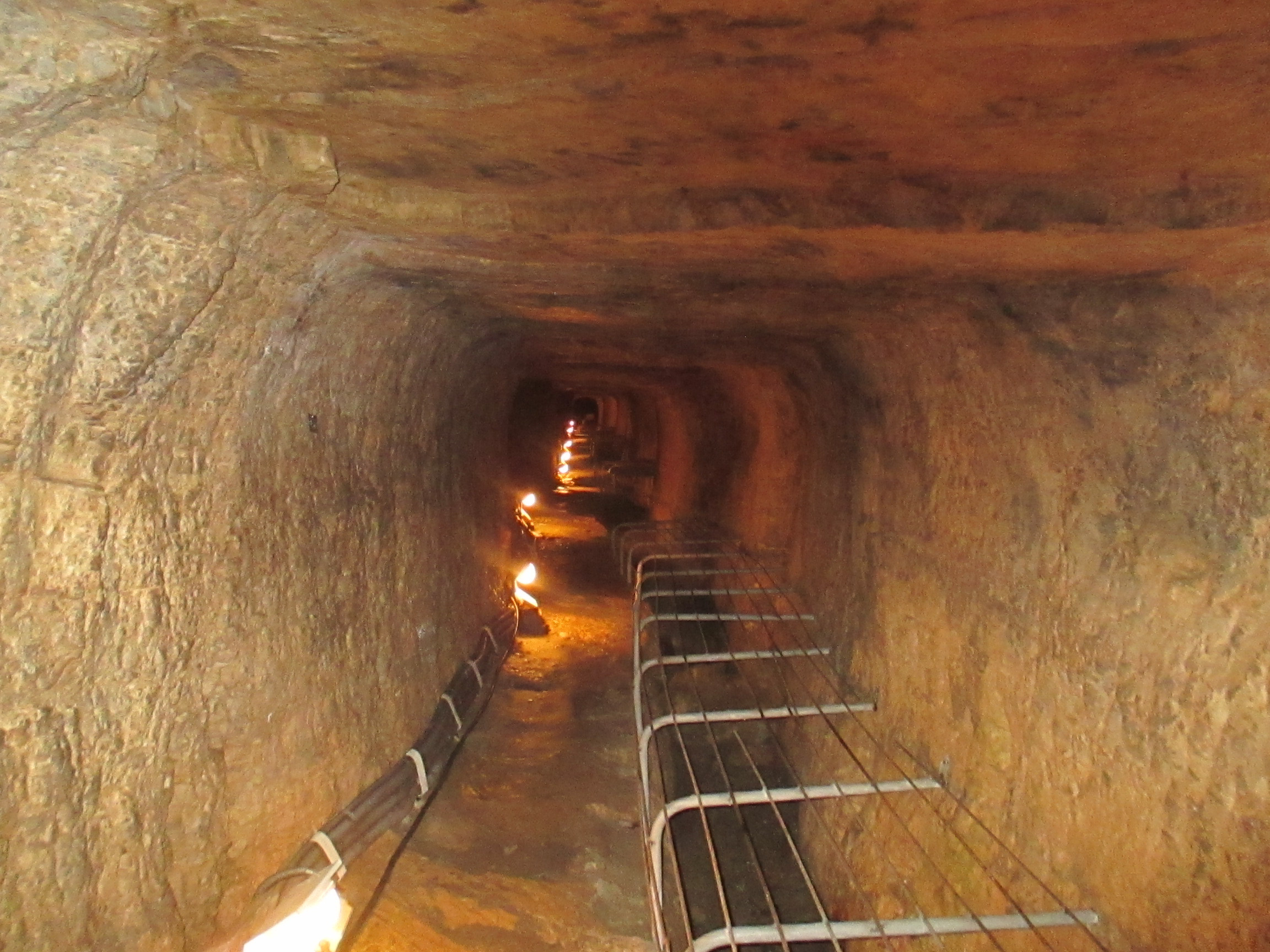
Tunnel of Eupalinos aqueduct tunnel in Samos, Greece, which is a famous example of ancient tunnel and survey engineering.

=== Ancient engineering ===
One of the oldest examples of geological engineering principles is the Euphrates tunnel, which was constructed around 2180 B.C. – 2160 B.C... This, and other tunnels and qanats from around the same time were used by ancient civilizations such as Babylon and Persia for the purposes of irrigation. Another famous example where geological engineering principles were used in an ancient engineering project was the construction of the Eupalinos aqueduct tunnel in Ancient Greece. This was the first tunnel to be constructed inward from both ends using principles of geometry and trigonometry, marking a significant milestone for both civil engineering and geological engineering

=== Geological engineering as a discipline ===
Although projects that applied geological engineering principles in their design and construction have been around for thousands of years, these were included within the civil engineering discipline for most of this time. Courses in geological engineering have been offered since the early 1900s; however, these remained specialized offerings until a large increase in demand arose in the mid-20th century. This demand was created by issues encountered from development of increasingly large and ambitious structures, human-generated waste, scarcity of mineral and energy resources, and anthropogenic climate change – all of which created the need for a more specialized field of engineering with professional engineers who were also experts in geological or Earth sciences.

Notable disasters that are attributed to the formal creation of the geological engineering discipline include dam failures in the United States and western Europe in the 1950s and 1960s. These most famously include the St Francis dam failure (1928), Malpasset dam failure (1959), and the Vajont dam failure (1963), where a lack of knowledge of geology resulted in almost 3,000 deaths between the latter two alone. The Malpasset dam failure is regarded as the largest civil engineering disaster of the 20th century in France and Vajont dam failure is still the deadliest landslide in European history.

== Education ==
Post-secondary degrees in geological engineering are offered at various universities around the world but are concentrated primarily in North America. Geological engineers often obtain degrees that include courses in both geological or Earth sciences and engineering. To practice as a professional geological engineer, a bachelor's degree in a related discipline from an accredited institution is required. For certain positions, a Master’s or Doctorate degree in a related engineering discipline may be required. After obtaining these degrees, an individual who wishes to practice as a professional geological engineer must go through the process of becoming licensed by a professional association or regulatory body in their jurisdiction.

=== Canadian institutions ===
In Canada, 8 universities are accredited by Engineers Canada to offer undergraduate degrees in geological engineering. Many of these universities also offer graduate degree programs in geological engineering. These include:

- Queen’s University (Department of Geological Sciences and Geological Engineering) (1975 – present),
- École Polytechnique (1965 – present),
- Université Laval (1965 – present),
- Université du Québec à Chicoutimi (1983 – present),
- University of British Columbia (1965 – present),
- University of New Brunswick (jointly administered by Department of Earth Sciences and Department of Civil Engineering) (1984 – present),
- University of Saskatchewan (1965 – present), and
- University of Waterloo (1986 – present).

=== American institutions ===
In the United States there are 13 geological engineering programs recognized by the Engineering Accreditation Commission (EAC) of the Accreditation Board for Engineering and Technology (ABET). These include:

- Colorado School of Mines (1936 – present),
- Michigan Technological University (1951 – present),
- Missouri University of Science and Technology (1973 – present),
- Montana Technological University (1972–present),
- South Dakota School of Mines and Technology (1950 – present),
- The University of Utah (1952 – present),
- University of Alaska-Fairbanks (1941 – present),
- University of Minnesota Twin Cities (1950 – present),
- University of Mississippi (1987 – present),
- University of Nevada, Reno (1958 – present),
- University of North Dakota (1984 – present),
- University of Texas at Austin (1998 – present), and
- University of Wisconsin – Madison (1993 – present).

=== Other institutions ===
Universities in other countries that hold accreditation to offer degree programs in geological engineering from the EAC by the ABET include:

- Escuela Superior Politécnica Del Litoral, Guayaquil, Ecuador (2018 – present),
- Istanbul Technical University, Istanbul, Turkey (2009 – present),
- Universidad Nacional de Ingeniería, Rímac, Peru (2017 – present), and
- Universidad Politécnica de Madrid, Madrid, Spain (2014 – present).

== Specializations ==
In geological engineering there are multiple subdisciplines which analyze different aspects of Earth sciences and apply them to a variety of engineering projects. The subdisciplines listed below are commonly taught at the undergraduate level, and each has overlap with disciplines external to geological engineering. However, a geological engineer who specializes in one of these subdisciplines throughout their education may still be licensed to work in any of the other subdisciplines.

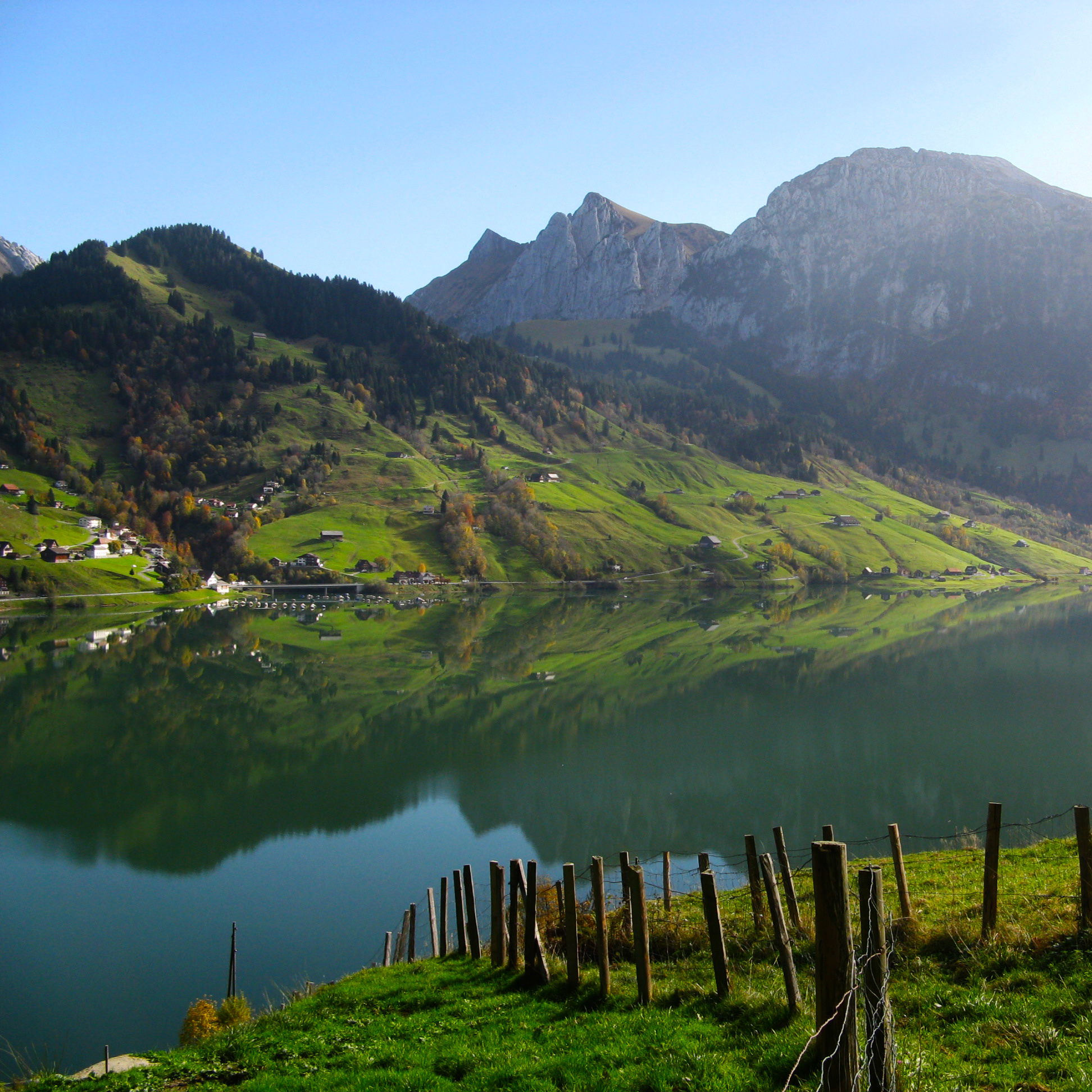
Mountain lake showing surface water. Geoenvironmental engineers (subdiscipline of geological engineering) work on managing drinking water supplies and remediation of contaminated surface water and groundwater.

=== Geoenvironmental and hydrogeological engineering ===
Geoenvironmental engineering is the subdiscipline of geological engineering that focuses on preventing or mitigating the environmental effects of anthropogenic contaminants within soil and water. It solves these issues via the development of processes and infrastructure for the supply of clean water, waste disposal, and control of pollution of all kinds. The work of geoenvironmental engineers largely deals with investigating the migration, interaction, and result of contaminants; remediating contaminated sites; and protecting uncontaminated sites. Typical work of a geoenvironmental engineer includes:

- The preparation, review, and update of environmental investigation reports,
- The design of projects such as water reclamation facilities or groundwater monitoring wells which lead to the protection of the environment,
- Conducting feasibility studies and economic analyses of environmental projects,
- Obtaining and revising permits, plans, and standard procedures,
- Providing technical expertise for environmental remediation projects which require legal actions,
- The analysis of groundwater data for the purpose of quality-control checks,
- The site investigation and monitoring of environmental remediation and sustainability projects to ensure compliance with environmental regulations, and
- Advising corporations and government agencies regarding procedures for cleaning up contaminated sites.

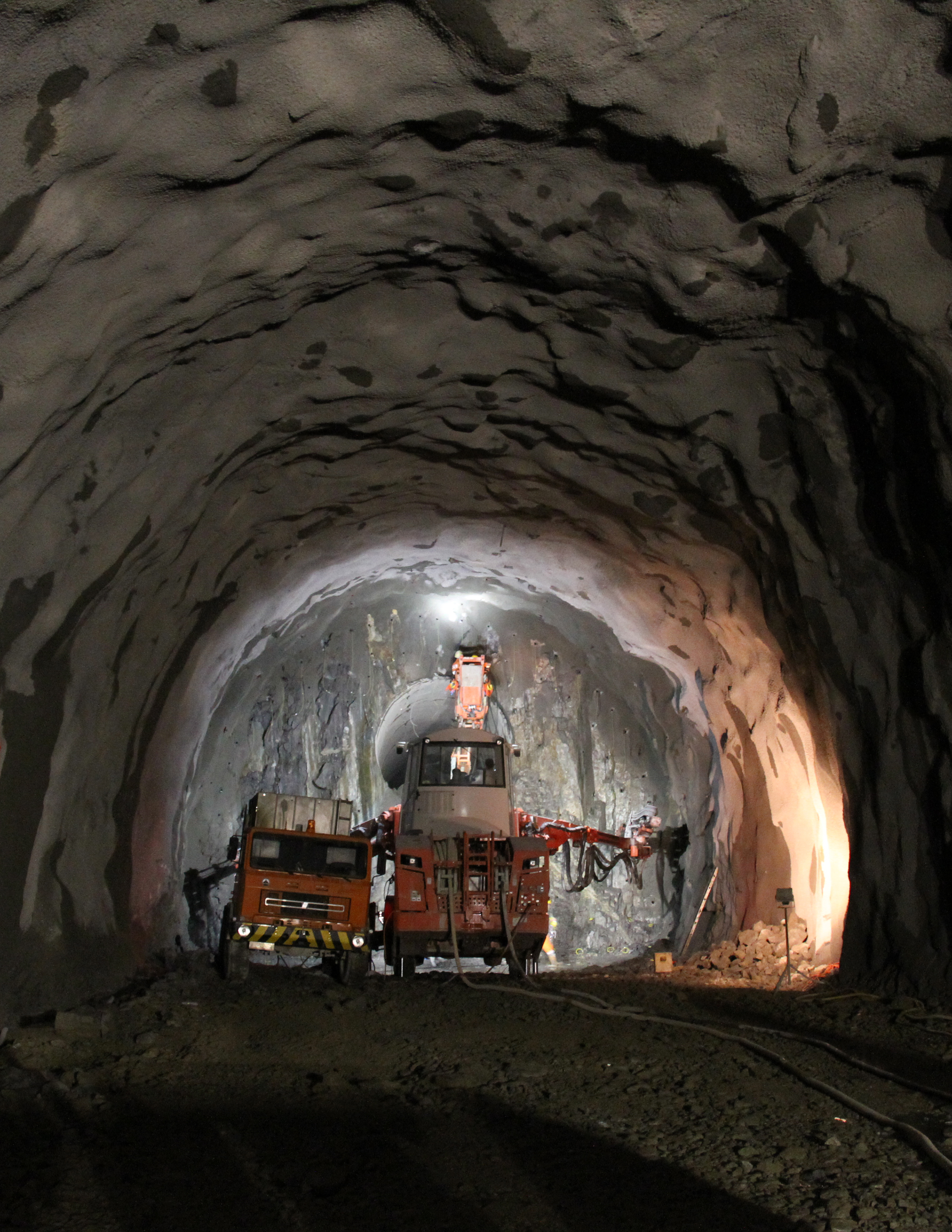
A tunnel under construction by conventional excavation methods with a pilot tunnel through tunnel face and a drill jumbo positioned near the face. Rock engineers and geotechnical engineers (subdisciplines of geological engineering) are involved with the design and construction of underground excavations.

=== Mineral and energy resource exploration engineering ===
Mineral and energy resource exploration (commonly known as MinEx for short) is the subdiscipline of geological engineering that applies modern tools and concepts to the discovery and sustainable extraction of natural mineral and energy resources. A geological engineer who specializes in this field may work on several stages of mineral exploration and mining projects, including exploration and orebody delineation, mine production operations, mineral processing, and environmental impact and risk assessment programs for mine tailings and other mine waste. Like a mining engineer, mineral and energy resource exploration engineers may also be responsible for the design, finance, and management of mine sites.

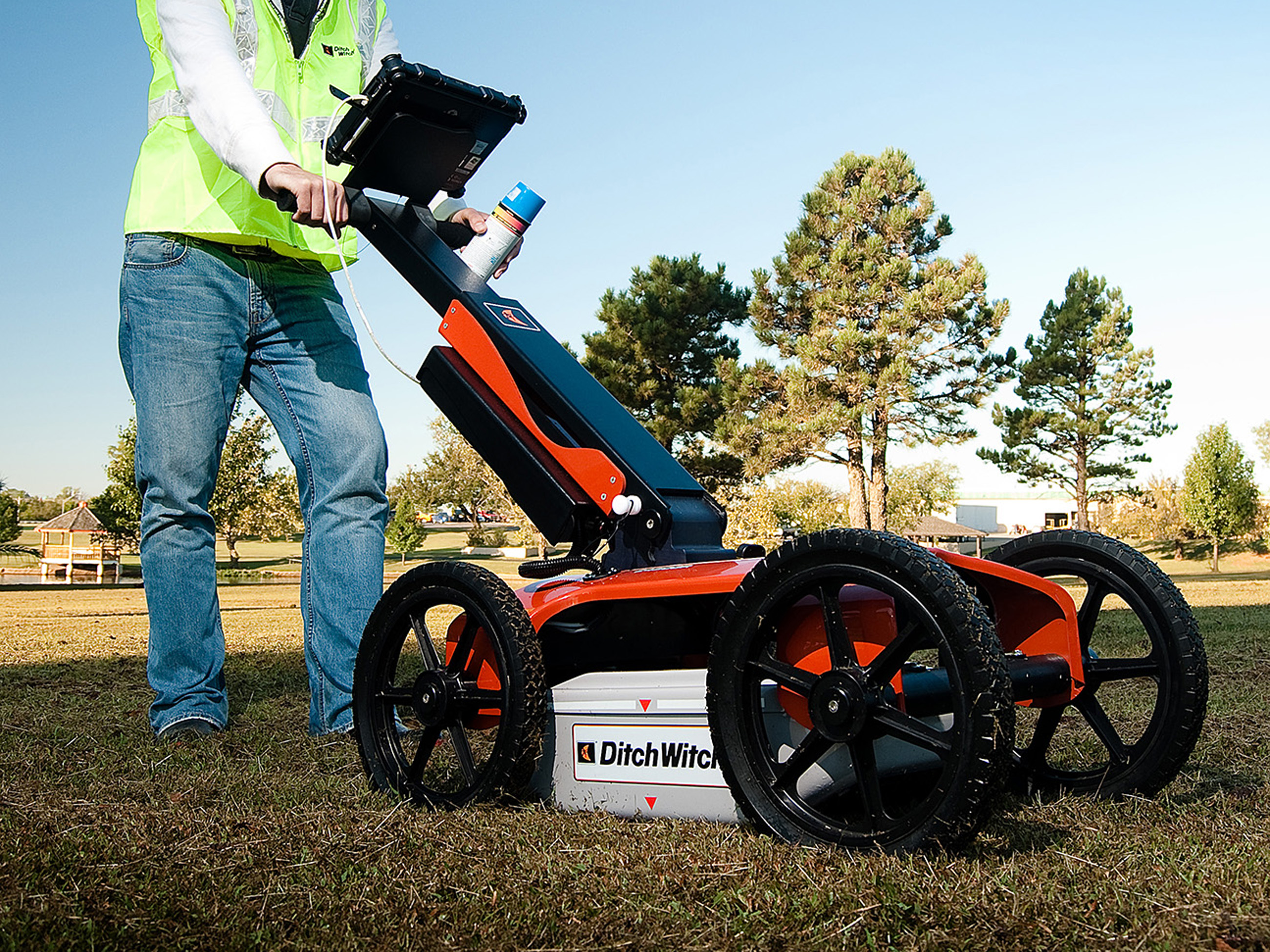
A Ground Penetrating Radar (GPR) being used to conduct a geophysical survey. Geophysical engineers (subdiscipline of geological engineering) use multiple geophysical techniques to noninvasively investigate the Earth's subsurface at all scales and use the results in a variety of engineering projects.

=== Geophysical engineering (applied geophysics) ===
Geophysical engineering is the subdiscipline of geological engineering that applies geophysics principles to the design of engineering projects such as tunnels, dams, and mines or for the detection of subsurface geohazards, groundwater, and pollution. Geophysical investigations are undertaken from ground surface, in boreholes, or from space to analyze ground conditions, composition, and structure at all scales. Geophysical techniques apply a variety of physics principles such as seismicity, magnetism, gravity, and resistivity. This subdiscipline was created in the early 1990s as a result of an increased demand in more accurate subsurface information created by a rapidly increasing global population. Geophysical engineering and applied geophysics differ from traditional geophysics primarily by their need for marginal returns and optimized designs and practices as opposed to satisfying regulatory requirements at a minimum cost

== Job responsibilities ==
Geological engineers are responsible for the planning, development, and coordination of site investigation and data acquisition programs for geological, geotechnical, geophysical, geoenvironmental, and hydrogeological studies. These studies are traditionally conducted for civil engineering, mining, petroleum, waste management, and regional development projects but are becoming increasingly focused on environmental and coastal engineering projects and on more specialized projects for long-term underground nuclear waste storage. Geological engineers are also responsible for analyzing and preparing recommendations and reports to improve construction of foundations for civil engineering projects such as rock and soil excavation, pressure grouting, and hydraulic channel erosion control. In addition, geological engineers analyze and prepare recommendations and reports on the settlement of buildings, stability of slopes and fills, and probable effects of landslides and earthquakes to support construction and civil engineering projects. They must design means to safely excavate and stabilize the surrounding rock or soil in underground excavations and surface construction, in addition to managing water flow from, and within these excavations.

Geological engineers also perform a primary role in all forms of underground infrastructure including tunnelling, mining, hydropower projects, shafts, deep repositories and caverns for power, storage, industrial activities, and recreation. Moreover, geological engineers design monitoring systems, analyze natural and induced ground response, and prepare recommendations and reports on the settlement of buildings, stability of slopes and fills, and the probable effects of natural disasters to support construction and civil engineering projects. In some jobs, geological engineers conduct theoretical and applied studies of groundwater flow and contamination to develop site specific solutions which treat the contaminants and allow for safe construction. Additionally, they design means to manage and protect surface and groundwater resources and remediation solutions in the event of contamination. If working on a mine site, geological engineers may be tasked with planning, development, coordination, and conducting theoretical and experimental studies in mining exploration, mine evaluation and feasibility studies relative to the mining industry. They conduct surveys and studies of ore deposits, ore reserve calculations, and contribute mineral resource expertise, geotechnical and geomechanical design and monitoring expertise and environmental management to a developing or ongoing mining operation. In a variety of projects, they may be expected to design and perform geophysical investigations from surface using boreholes or from space to analyze ground conditions, composition, and structure at all scales

== Professional associations and licensing ==
Professional Engineering Licenses may be issued through a municipal, provincial/state, or federal/national government organization, depending on the jurisdiction. The purpose of this licensing process is to ensure professional engineers possess the necessary technical knowledge, real-world experience, and basic understanding of the local legal system to practice engineering at a professional level. In Canada, the United States, Japan, South Korea, Bangladesh, and South Africa, the title of Professional Engineer is granted through licensure. In the United Kingdom, Ireland, India, and Zimbabwe the granted title is Chartered Engineer. In Australia, the granted title is Chartered Professional Engineer. Lastly, in the European Union, the granted title is European Engineer. All these titles have similar requirements for accreditation, including a recognized post-secondary degree and relevant work experience.

=== Canada ===
In Canada, Professional Engineer (P.Eng.) and Professional Geoscientist (P.Geo.) licenses are regulated by provincial professional bodies which have the groundwork for their legislation laid out by Engineers Canada and Geoscientists Canada. The provincial organizations are listed in the table below.

Regulatory body responsible for awarding licenses for professional engineering and geosciences in each province and territory of Canada
Province	Regulatory Body
Alberta	Association of Professional Engineers and Geoscientists of Alberta
British Columbia	Association of Engineers and Geoscientists of British Columbia
Manitoba	Engineers Geoscientists of Manitoba
New Brunswick	Association of Professional Engineers and Geoscientists of New Brunswick
Newfoundland and Labrador	Professional Engineers and Geoscientists of Newfoundland and Labrador
Northwest Territories	Northwest Territories and Nunavut Association of Professional Engineers and Geoscientists
Nova Scotia	Association of Professional Engineers of Nova Scotia
Nunavut	Northwest Territories and Nunavut Association of Professional Engineers and Geoscientists
Ontario	Professional Engineers Ontario
Prince Edward Island	Association of Professional Engineers of Prince Edward Island
Quebec	Ordre des ingénieurs du Québec
Saskatchewan	Association of Professional Engineers and Geoscientists of Saskatchewan
Yukon	Engineers of Yukon

=== United States ===
In the United States, all individuals seeking to become a Professional Engineer (P.E.) must attain their license through the Engineering Accreditation Commission (EAC) of the Accreditation Board for Engineering and Technology (ABET). Licenses to be a Certified Professional Geologist in the United States are issued and regulated by the American Institute of Professional Geologists (AIPG)

== Professional Societies ==
Professional societies in geological engineering are not-for-profit organizations that seek to advance and promote the represented profession(s) and connect professionals using networking, regular conferences, meetings, and other events, as well as provide platforms to publish technical literature through forms of conference proceedings, books, technical standards, and suggested methods, and provide opportunities for professional development such as short courses, workshops, and technical tours. Some regional, national, and international professional societies relevant to geological engineers are listed here:

- American Geophysical Union (AGU)
- American Geosciences Institute (AGI)
- American Rock Mechanics Association (ARMA)
- Association of Environmental and Engineering Geologists (AEG)
- Association for Mineral Exploration (AME)
- Atlantic Geoscience Society (AGS)
- Canadian Dam Association (CDA)
- Canadian Federation of Earth Sciences (CFES)
- Canadian Geophysical Union (CGU)
- Canadian Geotechnical Society (CGS)
- Canadian Institute of Mining, Metallurgy and Petroleum (CIM)
- Canadian Society of Petroleum Geologists (CSPG)
- Canadian Rock Mechanics Association (CARMA)
- European Association of Geoscientists & Engineers (EAGE)
- European Geosciences Union (EGU)
- European Federation of Geologists (EFG)
- Geological Association of Canada (GAC)
- Geological Society of America (GSA)
- Geoscience Information Society (GSIS)
- Institute of Materials, Minerals and Mining (IOM3)
- International Association for Engineering Geology and the Environment (IAEG)
- International Association of Hydrogeologists (IAH)
- International Council on Mining and Metals (ICMM)
- International Society for Rock Mechanics and Rock Engineering (ISRM)
- International Society for Soil Mechanics and Geotechnical Engineering (ISSMGE)
- International Tunnelling Association (ITA)
- International Union of Geological Sciences (IUGS)
- Mineralogical Association of Canada (MAC)
- Mining Association of Canada (MAC)
- Prospectors and Developers Association of Canada (PDAC)
- Society for Mining, Metallurgy & Exploration (SME)
- Society of Exploration Geophysicists (SEG)
- Tunnelling Association of Canada (TAC)
- U.S. Geological Survey (USGS)
- U.S. National Mining Association (NMA)

== Distinction from engineering geology ==
Engineering geologists and geological engineers are both interested in the study of the Earth, its shifting movement, and alterations, and the interactions of human society and infrastructure with, on, and in Earth materials. Both disciplines require licenses from professional bodies in most jurisdictions to conduct related work. The primary difference between geological engineers and engineering geologists is that geological engineers are licensed professional engineers (and sometimes also professional geoscientists/geologists) with a combined understanding of Earth sciences and engineering principles, while engineering geologists are geological scientists whose work focusses on applications to engineering projects, and they may be licensed professional geoscientists/geologists, but not professional engineers. The following subsections provide more details on the differing responsibilities between engineering geologists and geological engineers.

=== Engineering geology ===
Engineering geologists are applied geological scientists who assess problems that might arise before, during, and after an engineering project. They are trained to be aware of potential problems like:

- landslides,
- faults,
- unstable ground,
- groundwater challenges, and
- floodplains.

They use a variety of field and laboratory testing techniques to characterize ground materials that might affect the construction, the long-term safety, or environmental footprint of a project. Job responsibilities of an engineering geologist include:

- collecting samples and surveys,
- conducting lab tests on samples,
- assessing in situ soil or rock conditions at many scales,
- preparing reports based on testing and on-site observations for clients, and
- creating geological models, maps, and sections.

=== Geological engineering ===
Geological engineers are engineers with extensive knowledge of geological or Earth sciences as well as engineering geology, engineering principles, and engineering design practices. These professionals are qualified to perform the role of or interact with engineering geologists. Their primary focus, however, is the use of engineering geology data, as well as engineering skills to:

- Design advanced exploration programs, environmental management or remediation projects including:
  - Groundwater extraction and sustainability,
  - Natural hazard mitigation systems,
  - Energy resource exploration and extraction,
  - Mineral resource exploration and extraction, and
  - Environmental remediation.
- Design Infrastructure, including:
  - Surface works,
  - Foundations,
  - Tunnels,
  - Dams,
  - Caverns, and
  - Other construction that interfaces with the ground.
- Oversee components of mining including:
  - Advanced resource assessment and economics,
  - Mineral processing,
  - Mine planning, and
  - Geomechanical and geotechnical stability.

In all these activities, the geological model, geological history, and environment, as well as measured engineering properties of relevant Earth materials are critical to engineering design and decision making.

== See also ==
- Civil engineering
- Engineering geology
- Geology
- Environmental engineering
- Mining engineering
- Petroleum engineering
