= Ketin =

Ketin is a surname. Notable people with the surname include:

- İhsan Ketin (1914–1995), Turkish Earth scientist
- Nuttapong Ketin (born 1992), Thai swimmer

== See also ==
- Natural History Museum of İhsan Ketin
