= Engineering Geology (journal) =

- Discipline: Engineering geology
- Language: English
- Edited by: G.B. Crosta, R.J. Shlemon, C.H. Juang, C. Carranza-Torres

Publication details
- Former names: Mining Science and Technology
- History: 1965-present
- Publisher: Elsevier
- Frequency: 18/year
- Impact factor: 3.100 (2017)

Standard abbreviations
- ISO 4: Eng. Geol.

Indexing
- CODEN: EGGOAO
- ISSN: 0013-7952
- LCCN: 68005822
- OCLC no.: 1567904

Links
- Journal homepage; Online access

Engineering Geology is a peer-reviewed scientific journal published by Elsevier. The journal covers research on engineering geology. The editors-in-chief are G.B. Crosta (University of Milan), R.J. Shlemon (Roy J. Shlemon & Associates Inc., Newport Beach, California), C.H. Juang (Clemson University), C. Carranza-Torres (University of Minnesota Duluth). The journal publishes research papers, case studies and histories, and reviews. The journal was established in 1965.

== Abstracting and indexing ==
This journal is abstracted and indexed in:

- Science Citation Index
- Current Contents/Engineering, Computing & Technology
- Bibliography and Index of Geology
- Bulletin Signalétique
- Engineering Index
- GEOBASE
- Geotechnical Abstracts
- PASCAL
- Scopus
- Chemical Abstracts Service - CASSI

According to the 2018 Journal Citation Reports, the journal has a 2017 impact factor of 3.100.

== See also ==
- Quarterly Journal of Engineering Geology & Hydrogeology
- Bulletin of Engineering Geology and the Environment
