= Hans Cloos =

German geologist

- Born: 8 November 1885; Magdeburg, German Empire
- Died: 26 September 1951 (aged 65); Bonn, West Germany
- Awards: Penrose Medal (1948)
- Scientific career
- Fields: geology
- Workplaces: University of Breslau
- Doctoral students: Henryk Stenzel; İhsan Ketin; Henno Martin

Hans Cloos (8 November 1885 – 26 September 1951) was a prominent German structural geologist.

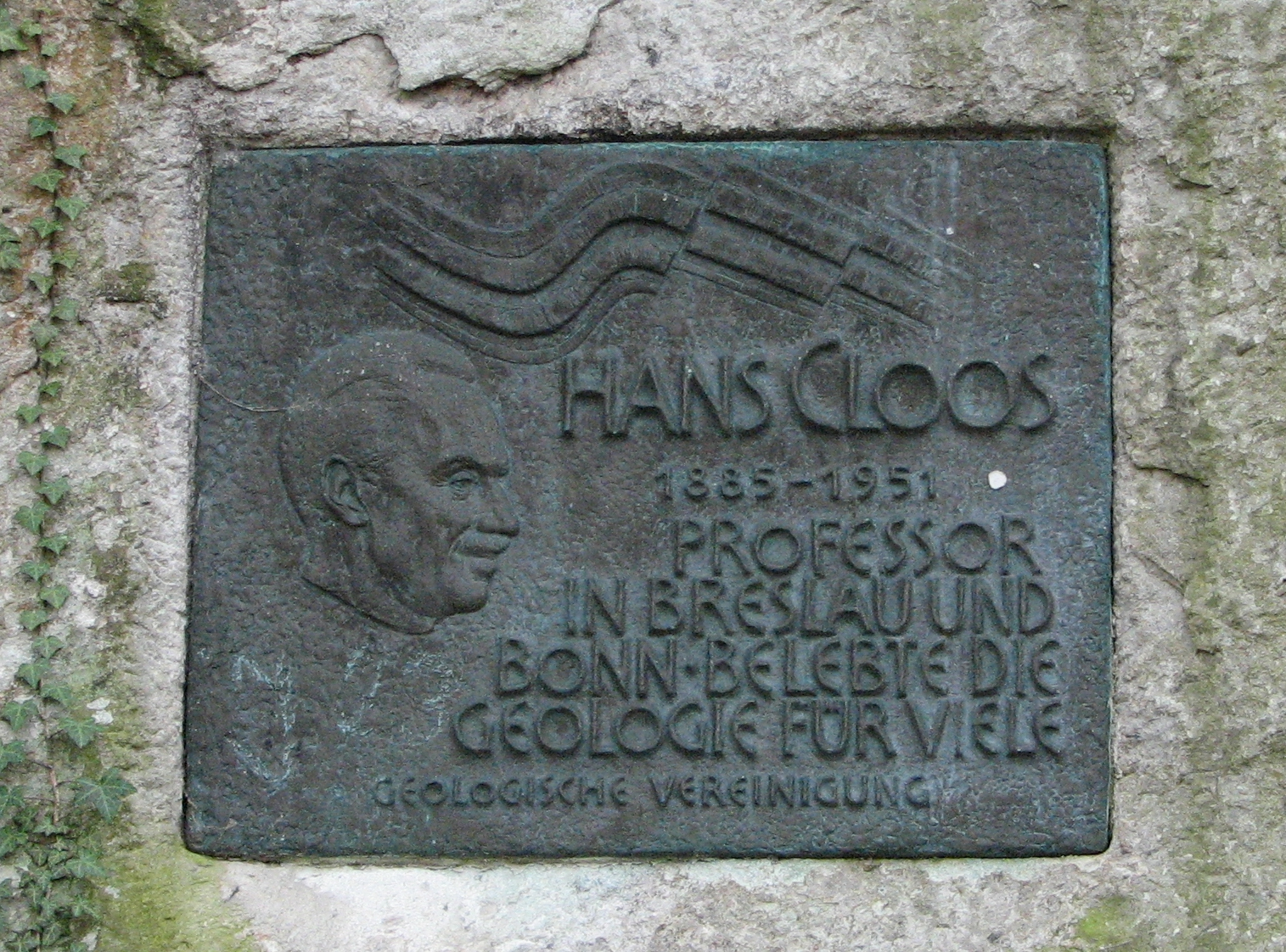
Memorial plaque of Cloos

Born in Magdeburg, Germany, Hans Cloos earned his doctorate at Freiburg in 1910, then worked in Indonesia and Namibia up until the start of First World War. During the war his geological skills were put to use along the western front.

Following the war, he began a study of plutons and their interior structure. In 1919 he became professor of geology at the University of Breslau. His younger brother, Ernst Cloos, who was born in 1898, would come to study geology at Breslau under his brother and later became a prominent geologist and professor at Johns Hopkins University.

In 1926 Cloos left Breslau to become professor of geology at the University of Bonn. He made additional geological trips to explore the Scandinavian region, England, and North America.

Professor Hans Cloos made pioneering studies of rock deformation, including granite tectonics. He employed scaled analogue models to study the physical mechanics of faulting, and examined how continents developed their structure. He was also noted for his artistic abilities, including music and draftsmanship.

Cloos died in Bonn, West Germany in 1951.

== The Hans Cloos medal ==
It is a senior award, which is presented by the International Association for Engineering Geology and the Environment (IAEG) since 1977 to an engineering geologist of outstanding merit. It is normally awarded every two years during an international congress of the IAEG.

According to the prize description, "the recipient should be a person of international repute who has made a major contribution to engineering geology in his/her written papers or to the development of engineering geology and/or the IAEG in their own area".

Since 2002, upon receipt of the prize, the winner also delivers a lecture, named the Hans Cloos lecture. Then, the winner is invited to submit a scientific paper based on the lecture for possible publication on the Bulletin of Engineering Geology and the Environment.

The winners of the Hans Cloos medal are listed below:

Year	Winner	Country
1977	Quido Záruba	Czechoslovakia
1978	Léon Calembert	Belgium
1980	Marcel Arnould	France
1982	Richard Wolters	West Germany
1984	Leopold Müller	Austria
1986	Evgenii M. Sergeev	(Soviet Union) USSR
1989	David J. Varnes	(United States) USA
1990	William R. Dearman	United Kingdom
1992	Michael Langer	Germany
1994	William R. Judd	(United States) USA
1996	Ricardo Oliveira	Portugal
1998	Owen L. White	Canada
2000	Paul G. Marinos	Greece
2002	John Knill	United Kingdom
2004	Vincenzo Cotecchia	Italy
2006	Robert L. Schuster	(United States) USA
2008	Wang Sijing	China
2010	Martin Culshaw	United Kingdom
2012	Victor Osipov	Russia
2014	Roger Cojean	France
2016	Resat Ulusay	Turkey
2018	Runqiu Huang	(China) China
2020	Faquan Wu	(China) China
2024	Niek Rengers	Netherlands
2026	TBA	

== Honors ==
- The wrinkle ridge Dorsum Cloos on the Moon is named after him.
- In 2006, Cloos was featured in the book Bedrock: Writers on the Wonders of Geology edited by Lauret E. Savoy, Eldridge M. Moores, and Judith E. Moores (Trinity University Press) which looks at how writing pays a tribute to the Earth's geological features.

== Bibliography ==
- Der Mechanismus tiefvulkanischer Vorgänge, 1921.
- Memoirs: Gespräch mit der Erde, 1947; translated into English as Conversations with the Earth by E.B. Garside, 1953.
