= List of engineering physics schools =

Engineering physics (or engineering science) can be studied at the bachelors, masters and Ph.D. levels at many universities, typically offered in a partnership between engineering faculties and the departments of physics.

== Canada ==
In Canada, the Canadian Engineering Accreditation Board is responsible for accrediting undergraduate engineering physics programs, graduate study in aerospace engineering is also available at several Canadian post-secondary institutions, though Canadian post-graduate engineering programs do not require accreditation.

- University of Alberta - Engineering Physics
- University of British Columbia - Engineering Physics
- Carleton University - Engineering Physics
- Dalhousie University - Engineering Physics
- McMaster University - Engineering Physics
- Queen's University - Engineering Physics
- Royal Military College of Canada - Engineering Physics
- University of Saskatchewan - Engineering Physics
- Simon Fraser University - Engineering Science
- University of New Brunswick - Engineering Physics (recently established, not yet accredited)
- University of Toronto - Engineering Science

Only undergraduate engineering programs in Canada are accredited, and this is done by the Canadian Engineering Accreditation Board.
