= Asher Shadmon =

Israeli engineering geologist

Professor Asher Shadmon (Hebrew: אשר שדמון; July 29, 1922 - May 10, 2011) is an Israeli engineering geologist who served as the first President of the International Association for Engineering Geology (IAEG). He has served on the United Nations International Commission on Building Stones and is a distinguished international consultant on stone as a building material.

Shadmon’s expertise in mining and quarrying is credited with singlehandedly fostering those industries in Israel. He is one of the world's experts on marble and other building stones, having written many books on the subject.

== Books and monographs ==
- Shadmon, Asher (1965), Marble in Israel, Jerusalem: State of Israel, Ministry of Development.
- Shadmon, Asher (1972), Stone in Israel, State of Israel, Ministry of Development, Natural Resources Research Organization.
- Shadmon, Asher (1983), “Mineral Structural Materials”; In: AGID Guide to Mineral Resources Development.
- Shadmon, Asher (1989), Stone: An Introduction, Practical Action Publishing; 2nd ed. 1996, Practical Action and ITDG Publishing (now Practical Action Publishing),( ISBN 1-85339-313-4).
- Shadmon, Asher (1997), The Use of Natural Slabby Stone Deposits for Wall Construction.
- Shadmon, Asher (1997), The Boulder Concept in Buildings Walls.
- Shadmon, Asher (2002), “Stone: What Is in a Name? Interdisciplinary Implications—An Overview”, In: Prikryl, Richard and Heather Viles, eds., Understanding and Managing Stone Decay, Prague: Karolinum Press, Charles University.

== See also ==
- Meleke
