= David Toll =

British civil engineer

David Geoffrey Toll (born 1959) is a British civil engineer and academic. He is Emeritus Professor of Engineering at Durham University. He studied at Cardiff University (BSc Civil Engineering) and Imperial College London (PhD Soil Mechanics). He is a Fellow of the Learned Society of Wales (FLSW) and a Fellow of the Institution of Civil Engineers (FICE). He was Chair of the British Geotechnical Association (BGA) from 2021-2023.

Toll is an expert in the engineering behaviour of unsaturated soils. He published one of the earliest Critical State frameworks for unsaturated soil behaviour (Toll, 1990). He developed the first commercial high-capacity tensiometer for measuring high suctions (up to 2MPa) in soils (Toll et al, 2013).

Toll has held Visiting Professor/Research Fellow posts at Tongji University, China, National University of Singapore, Nanyang Technological University, University of Sydney, University of Western Australia and University of Newcastle, Australia. He was the founding editor of the journal, Geotechnical & Geological Engineering and has been a member of the Editorial Boards for Géotechnique, Quarterly Journal of Engineering Geology and Hydrogeology and Transportation Geotechnics.

== International Society for Soil Mechanics and Geotechnical Engineering ==
Toll has had the following roles within ISSMGE:

- Chair, British Geotechnical Association (UK member society of ISSMGE) (2021–2023)
- Chair of Technical Committee TC106 on Unsaturated Soils of ISSMGE (2014–2022)
- Chair, Joint Technical Committee JTC2 of the Federation of International Geo-Engineering Societies (representing ISRM, ISSMGE, IAEG and IGS) (2005–2017)
