= Association of Environmental & Engineering Geologists =

American professional organization

- Abbreviation: AEG
- Formation: June 1957
- Founder: 13 engineering geologists
- Headquarters: 3035 E. 1st Avenue, Suite 201, Denver, Colorado 80206
- Location: United States
- Members: Active in 15 countries
- President: Cynthia Palomares (2020)
- Website: aegweb.org

The Association of Environmental & Engineering Geologists (AEG), (formerly "Association of Engineering Geologists") is the principal American association of professionals in the fields of geotechnical engineering, engineering geology, soils engineering, hydrological engineering, and environmental geology. The association also includes geologists, civil engineers, structural engineers, ecologists, petroleum engineers and others in fields relating to engineering geology and its effects on the environment.

== History ==
In June 1957, 13 local engineering geologists met in Sacramento, California, to discuss the need for organization of a society in the specific field of engineering geology. During the next eight months, this group (the founding charter members) set up the framework of the California Association of Engineering Geologists by formulating the aims of the organization, a definition of engineering geology, and membership qualifications. In February 1958, although the constitution and bylaws were yet to be completed, membership recruitment was begun. Three sections (Los Angeles, Sacramento and San Francisco) were established.

The association was incorporated according to the laws of the State of California on June 19, 1960. By this action, the original executive committee of twelve became the board of directors, and requisite constitutional changes were made accordingly.

During the early years following the formation of the association, it became increasingly apparent that a need for a similar organization existed with engineering geologists everywhere, not just in California. Evident from the first were the geologists outside California, who were concerned with the application of geology to problems of civil engineering, who showed a marked interest in the organization. In recognition of this need and interest, the membership voted better than 10 to 1 in late 1962 to remove all geographical limitations on the organization and to change the name to Association of Engineering Geologists. Constitutional changes to effect this organization were subsequently completed in early 1963.

In 1963, the first section outside of California (Washington State) was established. Seventeen sections, including two outside the United States, were recognized by 1973. On the occasion of the association's twenty-fifth year, twenty-two sections formed the regional units of the association.

In 1964, AEG was accepted as a member society of the American Geological Institute.

Membership is presently located in 15 countries. In the United States, AEG's membership comes from each of the 50 states, the District of Columbia and Puerto Rico.

At the Past Presidents’ Luncheon held at the 2004 annual meeting, the past presidents unanimously petitioned the executive council and board of directors to have the association's name changed to the Association of Environmental & Engineering Geologists. The name-change proposal was put up for a vote before the association membership and was approved. On September 22, 2005, the change became official at the AEG Corporate Business Meeting at the 2005 annual meeting. The name change reflects important changes in the public awareness of services provided by the association members.

The association has been serving members of both the environmental and engineering geology for a number of years, and the name change serves to provide formal recognition of this support.

== Current AEG ==
AEG publishes the AEG News, the AEG Insider and, in partnership with the Geological Society of America, the Environmental & Engineering Geoscience Journal.

AEG co-sponsors the Richard H. Jahns Distinguished Lecturer in Applied Geology with the Environmental and Engineering Geology Division (EEGD) of the Geological Society of America.

== Annual meetings ==
AEG promotes information sharing and networking through annual meetings, held in different locations each September.

== Upcoming annual meeting ==
2023: Portland, Oregon

== Past annual meeting locations ==
2022: Las Vegas, Nevada
2021: San Antonio, Texas
2020: Portland, Oregon (postponed for 2023)
2019: Asheville, North Carolina
2018: San Francisco, California – jointly with the XIII IAEG Congress
2017: Colorado Springs, Colorado
2016: Kona, Hawaii
2015: Pittsburgh, Pennsylvania
2014: Scottsdale, Arizona
2013: Seattle, Washington
2012: Salt Lake City, Utah
2011: Anchorage, Alaska
2010: Charleston, South Carolina
2009: Lake Tahoe, California

== Current and past presidents ==
2020: Cynthia Palomares
2019: David F. Fenster
2018: Greg Hempen
2017: Dale Andrews
2016: Paul Santi
2015: Ken Fergason
2014: Gary Luce
2013: Matt Morris
2012: Jennifer Bauer
2011: Bruce Hilton
2010: Duane Kreuger

The full list of past presidents can be found on the AEG Website.
