= Palaeogeography, Palaeoclimatology, Palaeoecology =

- Discipline: Palaeontology
- Language: English
- Edited by: Lucia Angiolini, Alexander Dickson, Howard Falcon-Lang, Paul Hesse, Meixun Zhao, Mary Elliot, Shuzhong Shen

Publication details
- History: 1965–present
- Publisher: Elsevier
- Frequency: 24/year
- Impact factor: 3.318 (2020)

Standard abbreviations
- ISO 4: Palaeogeogr. Palaeoclimatol. Palaeoecol.

Indexing
- CODEN: PPPYAB
- ISSN: 0031-0182
- LCCN: 65009956
- OCLC no.: 01761774

Links
- Journal homepage; Online archives

Palaeogeography, Palaeoclimatology, Palaeoecology ("Palaeo3") is a peer-reviewed scientific journal publishing multidisciplinary studies and comprehensive reviews in the field of palaeoenvironmental geology. The journal is edited by Howard Falcon-Lang, Shuzhong Shen, Alex Dickson, Mary Elliot, Meixun Zhao, Lucia Angiolini. It was established in 1965 and is currently published by Elsevier.

== Indexing and abstracting ==
Palaeogeography, Palaeoclimatology, Palaeoecology is indexed and abstracted in the following databases:

- AESIS
- Bibliography and Index of Geology
- BIOBASE
- BIOSIS
- Current Contents
- GEOBASE
- Meteorological and Geophysical Abstracts
- PASCAL
- Petroleum Abstracts
- Scopus
- SciSearch

According to the Journal Citation Reports, Advance in Space Research has a 2020 impact factor of 3.318.
