= International Association for Engineering Geology and the Environment =

International scientific society

- Abbreviation: IAEG
- Formation: 1964
- Type: NGO
- Purpose: Scientific and professional association
- Members: 3798
- General Secretary: Prof. Faquan Wu
- President: Prof. Vassilis Marinos
- Key people: Scott F. Burns, Jean-Alain Fleurisson, Jean Hutchinson, Rafig Azzam, Eugene Voznesensky, Huiming Tang, Bo An-Jang, Tamunoene Kingdom Simeon Abam, Doug Johnson, Helen Reeves, Resat Ulusay, Louis Wong, Stratis Karantanellis, Giorgio Lollino, Anthony Bowden, Moshood Niyi Tijani, Julien Cohen-Waeber, Francisco Nogueira de Jorge, Ranjan Kumar Dahal, Shengwen Qi, Stratis Karantanellis
- Main organ: Council
- Affiliations: International Union of Geological Sciences
- Website: www.iaeg.info
- Formerly called: International Association for Engineering Geology

The International Association for Engineering Geology and the Environment (IAEG) (French: Association Internationale de Géologie de I'lngénieur et de l'Environnement), formerly International Association for Engineering Geology, is an international scientific society that was founded in 1964. It is affiliated with the International Union of Geological Sciences (IUGS) and has 3,798 members spread across 59 national groups around the world.

The association operates with three goals in mind: encourage the advancement of engineering geology; improve teaching and training within the field; and work globally to collect, evaluate, and disseminate the results of geological engineering activities. Together with Springer Science+Business Media, it publishes the Bulletin of Engineering Geology and the Environment.

The first president of the IAEG was Asher Shadmon, who held the office from 1964 to 1968. The current president is Rafig Azzam from Aachen University of Technology.

Every two years, the IAEG awards the Hans Cloos medal to an engineering geologist of outstanding merit. Every four years, the IAEG organizes an international congress, during which a general meeting of the association takes place, and the board for the subsequent four years is elected. The XII IAEG Congress was held in Turin (Italy) in September 2014. The XIII IAEG Congress will be held in San Francisco (California, USA), in September 2018, and will also serve as the 61st annual meeting of the Association of Environmental & Engineering Geologists.

IAEG is a member of the Federation of International Geo-Engineering Societies (FedIGS).

== History ==
=== The birth of the IAEG ===
During the XXII International Geological Congress (IGS) in New Delhi, on 12 December 1964, the Israeli geologist Asher Shadmon remarked that quarry materials and mineral products used in engineering were not being properly discussed, and proposed the IUGS create and fund an international permanent commission dedicated to the topic. Other geologists at the congress suggested that the commission also examine the relationship between the materials in their natural place and the work of engineers.

On 17 December the assembly voted the following motion unanimously: "It is recommended that a distinct Commission of "Engineering Geology" should be established in the context of International Geological Congresses.[…] The objective of the Commission and its Sub-commissions would be to promote the knowledge and dissemination of appropriate information, gather ´case-histories´, prepare literature reviews and relevant catalogues, provide information on completed or ongoing research, gather statistical geological data on the industries, and determine the list of further research required".

On 19 December the interest in engineering geology was high, but due to scarcity of resources they were unable to support a new permanent commission. The executive committee of the IUGS proposed to create a small committee, headed by Shadmon, in charge of producing and presenting a report on the state of the situation by contacting the International Society for Soil Mechanics and the International Society for Rock Mechanics, as well as existing national societies of engineering geology.

However, on 21 December the delegates decided to immediately hold a new session during which the International Association for Engineering Geology (IAEG) was unanimously created. Besides Asher Shadmon, the founding members were Marcel Arnould (France), G. Bain (USA), M.S. Balasundaram (India), L.M.C. Calembert (Belgium), R.S. Chaturvedi (India), G.C. Chowdhary (India), E. Beneo (Italy), K. Erguvanli (Turkey), A. Hamza (India), M.S. Jain (India), L.E. Kent (South Africa), V.S. Krishnaswamy (India), J.D.S. Lakshmaman (France), A.R. Mahendra (India), M. Manfredi (Italy), V. Prasad (India), B. Ramchandran (India), J.Th. Rosenqvist (Norway), B. Sanatkumar (India), P.B. Srinivasan (India), L.S. Srivastava (India) and M. Zapata (Spain). They elected a provisional committee to steer the initial activity.

=== The first years ===
At the beginning, the association worked on enhancing the provisional committee to gain full international representation. By the end of 1966, the committee was composed as follows: Asher Shadmon (Israel), as president; Marcel Arnould (France), as Secretary; E. Beneo (Italy); V.S. Krishnaswamy, R.S. Mithal and M.S. Balasundaram (India); K. Erguvanli (Turkey); A.M. Hull (USA), president of the American Association of Engineering Geologist; E.M. Sergeev and N.V. Kolomenskij (USSR); Quido Záruba (Czechoslovakia); M.D. Ruiz (Brazil); G. Champetier de Ribes (France), as Treasurer. Discussions to join the IAEG were still ongoing with representatives from Australia, Japan and Mexico.

During the first two years the first statutes were established and a program of the activities was defined. The purposes and goals of the association were defined as follows: Article 1: "The scope of engineering geology covers the applications of earth sciences to engineering, planning, construction, prospecting, testing and processing of related materials"; Article 2: "The aims of the IAEG are to encourage research, training and dissemination of knowledge by developing the international cooperation in its relation to engineering".

At the 1967 meeting of the IUGS, a request for affiliation of the IAEG to the IUGS was presented and accepted by the executive committee. The decision was ratified unanimously by the general assembly of the IUGS on 23 August 1968 in Prague.

=== The first general assembly ===
The input from the Czechoslovak engineering geologists had been noticeable in the first years, especially that of Quido Záruba and Jaroslav Pasek. They were together responsible for organizing a section on engineering geology at the XXIII International Geological Congress (IGC) in Prague in 1968, at which they shared the aims of the IAEG. They also organised the first scientific symposium of the IAEG in Brno (Czechoslovakia), from 26 to 27 April 1968 and a second symposium during the IGC on "Engineering geology and land planning".

The first general assembly was held on 23 August 1968 in Prague during the XXIII IGC. At the time of the congress, the country was deeply affected by the movement of soviet troops. Nevertheless, the general assembly went ahead, the statutes were ratified and an executive committee was elected for a period of four years to replace the provisional committee.

The new committee was composed as follows: Quido Záruba (Czechoslovakia), President; Marcel Arnould (France), Secretary General; G. Champetier de Ribes (France), Treasurer; Asher Shadmon (Israel), Past President; L. Calembert (Belgium), Vice-president for Europe; L. Cluff (USA), Vice-president for North America; M.D. Ruiz (Brazil), Vice-president for South America; L. Oborn (New Zealand), vice president for Australasia; H. Tanaka (Japan), Vice-president for Asia; a representative from Ghana as vice-president for Africa. Other members: N.V. Kolomenskij (USSR); A Nemock (Czechoslovakia); J. Janjic (Yugoslavia); R. Glossop (United Kingdom); A. Drucker (Federal Republic of Germany); J.M. Crepeau (Canada).

In addition to the executive committee, three "working groups" were established:

1. Landslides, under the responsibility of J. Pasek (Czechoslovakia);
2. Soluble rocks, under the responsibility of F. Reuter (East Germany) and K. Erguvanli (Turkey);
3. Geotechnical mapping, under the responsibility of M. Matula (Czechoslovakia).

Lastly, it was decided to organize future congresses specifically for the IAEG. These were to be held alternately with the International Geological Congresses, allowing the IAEG to hold a general assembly every two years. They also added a scientific symposia for the years in between.

The first congresses with general assemblies were as follows:

- New Delhi (India) XXII IGC in 1964
- Prague (Czechoslovakia) XXIII IGC in 1968;
- Paris (France) 1st IAEG congress in 1970.

=== The Bulletin of the IAEG ===
The first elected executive committee decided in their second meeting at the UNESCO Palace in Paris (May 1969) to create a journal of the IAEG. This was to be edited and published by the Association and called the Bulletin of the IAEG (full name: "Bulletin of the International Association of Engineering Geology - Bulletin de l'Association Internationale de Géologie de l'Ingénieur").

The first edition of the Bulletin was distributed during the first IAEG congress in September 1970 in Paris. This was possible thanks to the personal efforts of Quido Záruba, the IAEG president, J. Pasek, Marcel Arnould and several other staff from the Paris School of Mines. Starting as a simple artisanal publication, the Bulletin became a scientific reference among the most respected journals in the fields of engineering geology, the environment and other geosciences. It is now published by Springer Science+Business Media and edited by the Association. It is known under the title Bulletin of Engineering Geology and the Environment.

=== The second statutes ===
As the field continued to grow there became increased involvement among engineering geologists. They assisted in the consultation, design, construction and supervision of large projects and in the assessment and remediation of environmental issues. Due to this expansion an update of the first statutes of the association was deemed necessary. The second statutes were approved by the general assembly in Kyoto (Japan) in 1992.

A new definition of engineering geology was given to reflected the advancements of the field during the previous 25 years. It reads as follows: "Engineering geology is a science devoted to the investigation, study and solution of engineering and environmental problems which may arise as the result of the interaction between geology and the works and activities of man as well as to the prediction of and the development of measures for prevention or remediation of geologic hazards. Engineering geology embraces: the definition of geomorphology, structure, stratigraphy, lithology and groundwater conditions of geological formations; the characterization of the mineralogical, physico-geomechanical, chemical and hydraulic properties of all earth materials involved in construction, resource recovery and environmental change; the assessment of the mechanical and hydrologic behaviour of soil and rock masses; the prediction of changes to the above properties with time; the determination of the parameters to be considered in the stability analysis of engineering works and of earth masses; and the improvement and maintenance of the environmental condition and of the properties of the terrain".

== Members ==
As of December 2024, the IAEG has 4,857 members divided as follows:

- North America - 204 members.
- South America - 102 members.
- Europe - 1848 members.
- Africa - 172 members.
- Asia - 798 members.
- Australasia - 684 members.

The IAEG has 68 national groups (+1 for the territory of Chinese Taipei):

Country/Territory	President	Related association
Canada	Doug VanDine	The Canadian Geotechnical Society
USA	Eldon M. Gath	The Association of Environmental and Engineering Geologists
Argentina	Norberto Jorge Bejerman	Argentinian Association of Geology Applied to Engineering
Bolivia		
Brazil	Delfino Luiz Gouveia Gambetti	Association for Engineering Geology and the Environment
Chile		
Colombia	Édgar E. Rodriguez Granados	Colombian Geotechnical Society
Costa Rica		
Mexico	Víctor Manuel Hernández Madrigal	Mexican Society of Hydrological Risks
Paraguay	Roberto Andrada	Paraguayan Geotechnical Society
Peru	Sandra Paula Villacorta Chambi	IAEG Peruvian Group
Iceland	Birgir jonsson	
United Kingdom	Helen Reeves	The Engineering Group of the Geological Society of London (EGGS)
Ireland	Michael Looby	
Portugal	José Luís Machado do Vale	Portuguese Geotechnical Society
Spain	Carlos Delgado	
France	Aline Quenez	Comité Français de Géologie de l'Ingénieur et de l'Environnement.
Belgium	Philippe Welter	Belgian Society for Engineering Geology and Rocks Mechanics
Netherlands	Robrecht Schmitz	
Norway	Guro Groeneng	
Sweden	Gunilla Franzén	
Finland	Arto Koskiahde	
Estonia	Johannes Pello	
Lithuania	Kastytis Dundulis	
Russia	Victor I. Osipov	Sergeev Institute of Environmental Geoscience Ras (IEG RAS)
Poland	Pawel Dobak	
Czech Republic	Gianvito Scaringi	Czech National Group of the IAEG
Slovakia	Martin Ondrasik	Slovak Association of Engineering Geologists
Germany	Rafig Azzam	German Geotechnical Society; German Geological Society
Austria	Christian Zangerl	Austrian Geological Society
Switzerland	Ruedi Krähenbühl	
Denmark	Jan Dannemand Andersen	Danish Geotechnical Society
Italy	Giovanni Battista Crosta	IAEG Italian National Group
Hungary	Akos Torok	
Slovenia	Dušanka Brožič	
Croatia	Dražen Navratil	Croatian Geological Society (CGS)
Romania	Cristian Marunteanu	Romanian Association for Engineering Geology
Serbia	Dusko Sunaric	
Albania	Defrim Shkupi	
Greece	Marinos Vassilis	Greek Committee of Engineering Geology
Bulgaria	Dimcho Evstatiev	
Turkey	Reşat Ulusay	Turkish Society for Engineering Geology
Cyprus	Clio Grammi	Cyprus Association of Geologists and Mining Engineers
Georgia	Zurab Kakulia	
Iraq	Aqeel Al-Adili	
Iran	M. Fatemi	
Algeria	Belaid Alloul	
Nigeria	T.K.S. Abam	Nigerian Mining & Geosciences Society
South Africa	Phil Paige-Green	South African Institute for Engineering & Environmental Geologists
India	A K Singh	Indian Society of Engineering Geology
Nepal	Ranjan Kumar Dahal	Nepal Society of Engineering Geology
Bangladesh	A.T.M. Shakhawat Hossain	
China	Faquan Wu	
South Korea	Park Chung-hwa	
Japan	Masahiko Osada	Japan Society of Engineering Geology
Chinese Taipei	Tien-Chang Lai	Geological Society Located in Taipei
Thailand	Dennes T. Bergado	Southeast Asian Geotechnical Society
Vietnam	Ta Duc Thinh	
Singapore	Zhiye Zhao	Society for Rock Mechanics & Engineering Geology
Malaysia	Zakaria Mohamad	
Indonesia	Imam A. Sadisun	
Australia	Anthony Bowden	Australian Geomechanics Society
New Zealand	Ross Roberts	New Zealand Geotechnical Society

== Congresses ==
Following is a list of the international congresses of the IAEG, which are held every four years. Since 1998, the congresses have had a main theme, which is reflected in the denomination of the event.

- 1970 Paris, France, 1st IAEG Congress
- 1974 São Paulo, Brazil, 2nd IAEG Congress
- 1978 Madrid, Spain, 3rd IAEG Congress
- 1982 New Delhi, India, 4th IAEG Congress
- 1986 Buenos Aires, Argentina, 5th IAEG Congress
- 1990 Amsterdam, Netherlands, 6th IAEG Congress
- 1994 Lisbon, Portugal, 7th IAEG Congress
- 1998 Vancouver, Canada, 8th IAEG Congress, "A global view from the Pacific Rim"
- 2002 Durban, South Africa, 9th IAEG Congress, "Engineering geology for developing countries"
- 2006 Nottingham, United Kingdom, 10th IAEG Congress, "Engineering geology for tomorrow's cities"
- 2010 Auckland, New Zealand, 11th IAEG Congress, "Geologically active"
- 2014 Turin, Italy, 12th IAEG Congress, "Engineering geology for society and territory"
- 2018 San Francisco, United States, 13th IAEG Congress, "Engineering geology for a sustainable world"
- 2023 Chengdu, China, 14th IAEG Congress

The IAEG also organizes regional conferences. So far, Asian regional conferences, South American and European regional conferences have been held.

=== European regional conferences ===
- 2004 Liège, Belgium, 1st European regional conference, "Professional practices and engineering geological methods"
- 2008 Madrid, Spain, 2nd European regional conference, "Cities and their underground environment"
- 2021 Athens, Greece, 3rd European regional conference, "Leading to Innovative Engineering Geology Practices"

=== Asian regional conferences ===
- 1997 Tokyo, Japan, 1st Asian regional conference, "Dam geology"
- 1999 Bangi, Malaysia, 2nd Asian regional conference, "Engineering geology: Planning for sustainable development"
- 2001 Yogyakarta, Indonesia, 3rd Asian regional conference, "Natural resources management for regional development in tropical area"
- 2004 Hong Kong, 4th Asian regional conference, "Engineering geology for sustainable development in mountainous areas"
- 2005 Kathmandu, Nepal, 5th Asian regional conference, "Engineering geology, hydrology, and natural disasters"
- 2007 Seoul, South Korea, 6th Asian regional conference, "Geohazard in engineering geology"
- 2009 Chengdu, China, 7th Asian regional conference, "Geological engineering problems in major construction projects"
- 2011 Bangalore, India, 8th Asian regional conference, "Underground space technology"
- 2013 Beijing, China, 9th Asian regional conference, "Global view of engineering geology and the environment"
- 2015 Kyoto, Japan, 10th Asian regional conference, "Geohazards and engineering geology"
- 2017 Kathmandu, Nepal, 11th Asian regional conference, "Engineering geology for geodisaster management"
- 2019 Jeju, South Korea, 12th Asian regional conference

=== South American regional conferences ===
- 2022 Argentina, 1st South American regional conference
- 2024 Chile, 2nd South American regional conference
