= Henryk Stenzel =

Henryk Bronislaw Stenzel (7 February 1899 in Pabianice – 5 September 1980 in Houston), was an American paleontologist of Polish and Jewish descent.

== Biographical data ==
=== Biography ===
Born Henryk Sztencel, he studied at the University of Breslau, where the administration forced him to change the spelling of his name. In 1922 he got a doctoral degree on the basis of a thesis prepared under Hans Cloos. In 1925 he emigrated to the USA, where in 1929 he married Elsie née Brodbeck. He worked on Texas A&M University (then Agricultural and Mechanical College of Texas), University of Texas at Austin, University of Houston, Rice University, and Louisiana State University. He retired in 1977 because of health issues; he died after a long illness.

=== Functions and dignities ===
- President of the Society of Economic Paleontologists and Mineralogists (1949–50)
- President of the Paleontological Society (1955–56)
- Officiale delegate of the USA to the International Geological Congress (Mexico City, 1956)
- Honorary member of the Gulf Coast Section, Society of Economic Paleontologists and Mineralogists

== Scientific achievements ==
In the USA Stenzel worked mainly on Tertiary paleontology, including speciation in fossil bivalves. He described several new taxa of fossil bivalves. His main achievement is a complete taxonomic revision of fossil oysters, published as a separate volume of the Treatise on Invertebrate Paleontology (volume N-3, 1971).

== Eponymy ==
Stenzelia MacNeil, 1954, a genus (or subgenus) of Eocene bivalves, Stenzeloceras Whetstone & Teichert, 1978, a genus of Cretaceous nautiloids, and a few species have been named in his honor.
