= Natural History Museum of İhsan Ketin =

Museum in Turkey

Natural Museum of İhsan Ketin
- İhsan Ketin Doğa Tarihi Müzesi
- Location within Turkey
- Coordinates: 41°06′17″N 29°01′34″E
- Type: Natural history

İhsan Ketin Natural History Museum (Turkish: İhsan Ketin Doğa Tarihi Müzesi) is a museum within the Mining Engineering Faculty of Istanbul Technical University in Turkey. The museum was named after Turkish geologist İhsan Ketin (1914-1995)

The exhibited collections are

- Darwin 2000 Beagle series
- Istanbul invertebrate fossils
- Zonguldak fossil flora
- Solnhofen fossil fauna
- Aegean Region plants and fishes
