= Meleke =

Type of limestone

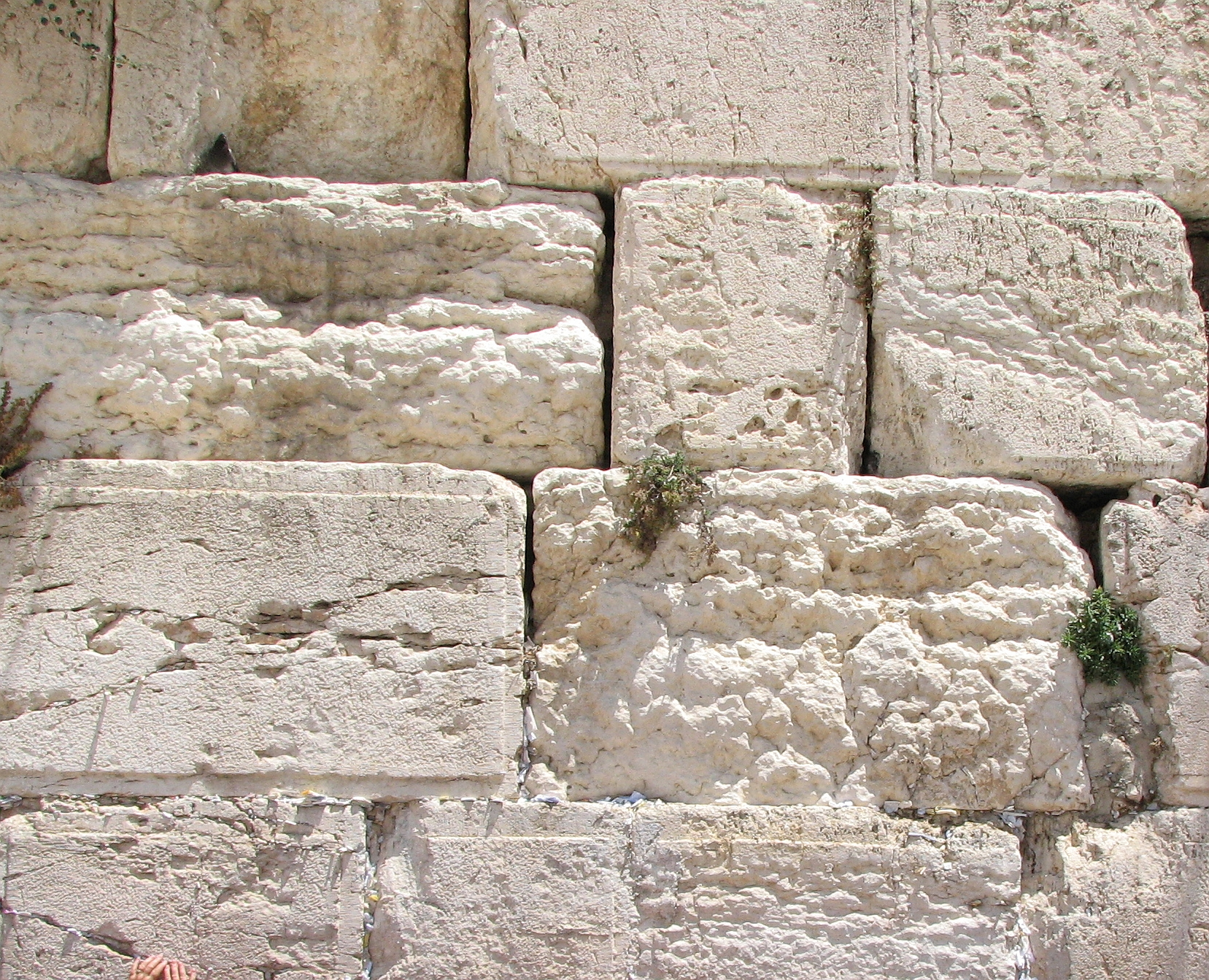
Meleke in the Western Wall, Jerusalem

Meleke (Arabic: ملكي, "royal", "kingly"; Hebrew: אבן ירושלמית), also transliterated melekeh or malaki, is a lithologic type of white, coarsely-crystalline, thickly bedded-limestone found in the Judaean Mountains in the West Bank. It has been used in the traditional architecture of Jerusalem since ancient times, especially in Herodian architecture. Though it is often popularly referred to as Jerusalem stone, that phrase can refer to a number of different types of stone found and used in or associated with Jerusalem.

== Name ==
Meleke is an Arabic word that originated in the jargon of local stonemasons. Translated as "kingly stone" (or "queenly"), "royal stone", or "stone of kings", the source of the word's meaning may derive from the use of Jerusalem stone in all the monumental tombs of Jerusalem. Israeli building stone authority Asher Shadmon cites the word as one of the local or colloquial "mason's terms" that have been "adopted by geologists" and are applied in the technical literature.

== Description ==
Meleke is quarried from the Upper Turonian Stage of the Bina (Baana) Formation of Late Cretaceous age, a layer about 10 meters in thickness and about 90 million years old. When freshly cut, it is a pure white limestone. It may retain its white color for many years or it may be insolated to a light golden yellow. The aged stone has a typical golden hue, but may range in tone from pinkish to off-white. When quarried it is soft and quite workable, but upon exposure it hardens and develops a clear surface that will take on a high polish. Meleke withstands natural erosion very well and provides a high-quality building stone, as well as commercial marble.

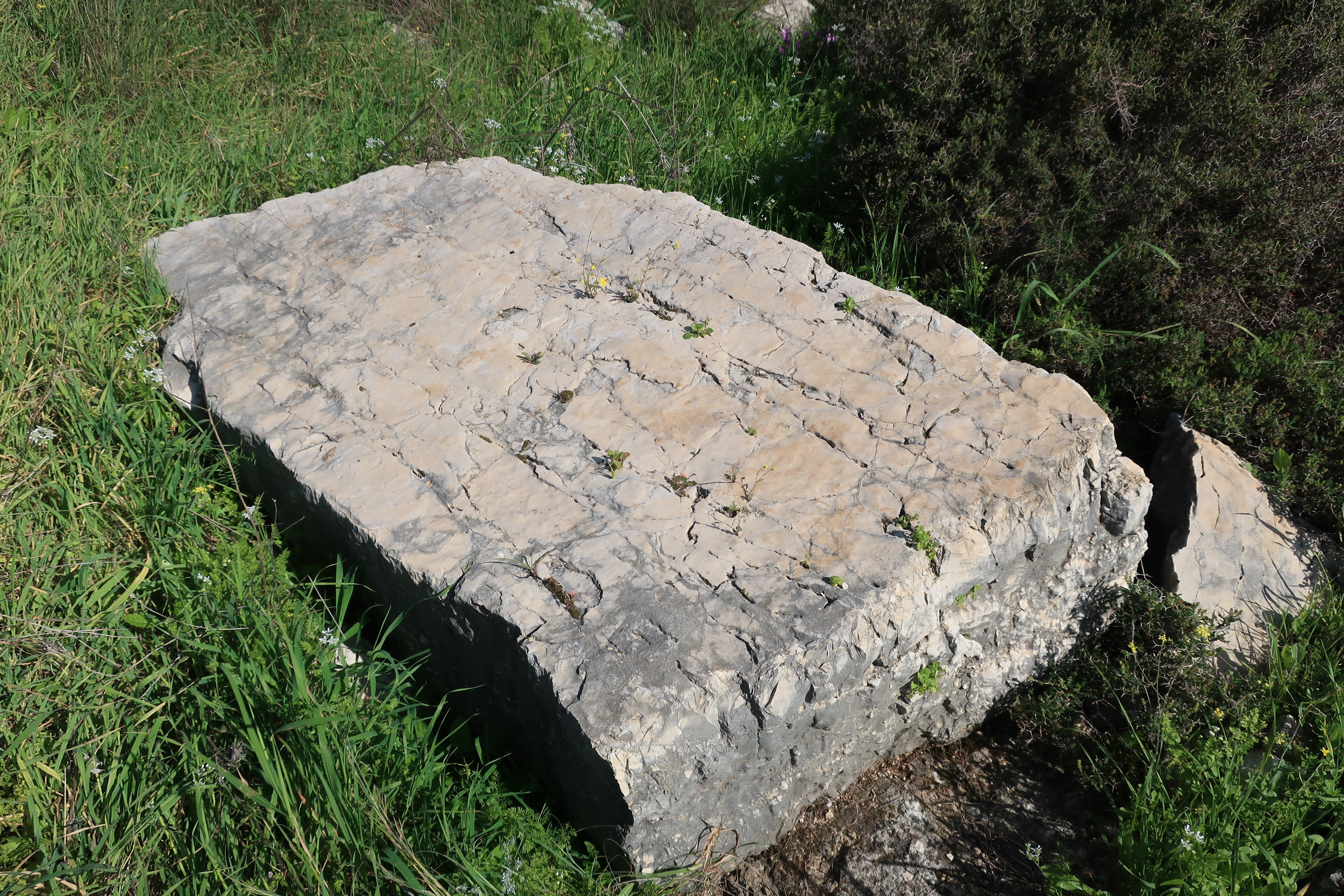
Block of limestone

== History ==
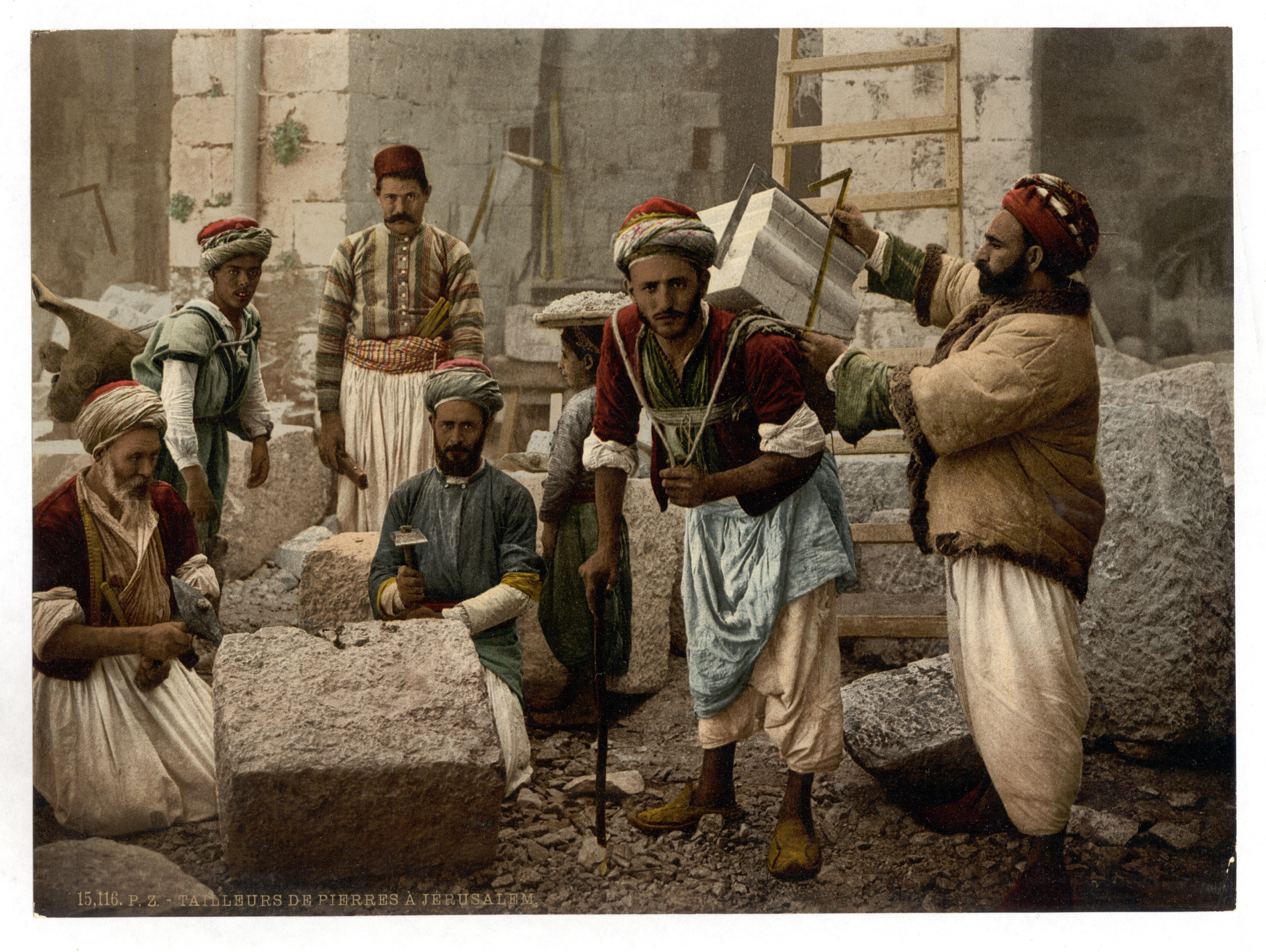
Stonemasons in Jerusalem (1890s photochrom print)

Used as a building material since ancient times, this "royal stone" has been of great importance to the history of the city of Jerusalem. When it is first exposed to the air it can be soft enough to be cut with a knife, but exposed to the air it hardens to make a stone of considerable durability, useful for building. Hundreds of caverns, cisterns, tombs and aqueducts in Jerusalem have been excavated from this stone. According to a long-standing legend, "Zedekiah's Cave", a large ancient meleke cave/quarry near the Damascus Gate in Jerusalem's Old City, was the source of the building material for Solomon's First Temple. Richard S. Barnett writes that ashlars in the Western Wall and the outer retaining wall of the extended Herodian Temple platform were apparently cut from meleke quarries near Bezetha.

The courtyard of the Tomb of Helena of Adiabene was originally a meleke stone quarry, and the staircase was once a ramp upon which the blocks extracted were hauled. Of the four types of limestone found in the Jerusalem region, two were used in building during the Islamic period in Palestine: meleke and mizzi, the latter being a harder stone, also known as "Palestinian marble". The meleke stone has been used extensively in the construction of tanks, underground chambers, and tombs, because of its softer nature. Since it resembles marble in appearance when it is polished, Italian architect and engineer Ermete Pierotti surmised that it was probably called by the name of "marble" in former times.

The use of Jerusalem stone was popular among the Frankish stonemasons of the Crusader Kingdom of Jerusalem in Palestine, who quarried it to make fine, carefully drafted building stones for use in door and window features, among other architectural features. Frankish markings from the distinctive diagonal tools used by their stonemasons can be seen on meleke stones put to secondary use in the walls surrounding the Old City of Jerusalem.

== In archaeological excavations ==
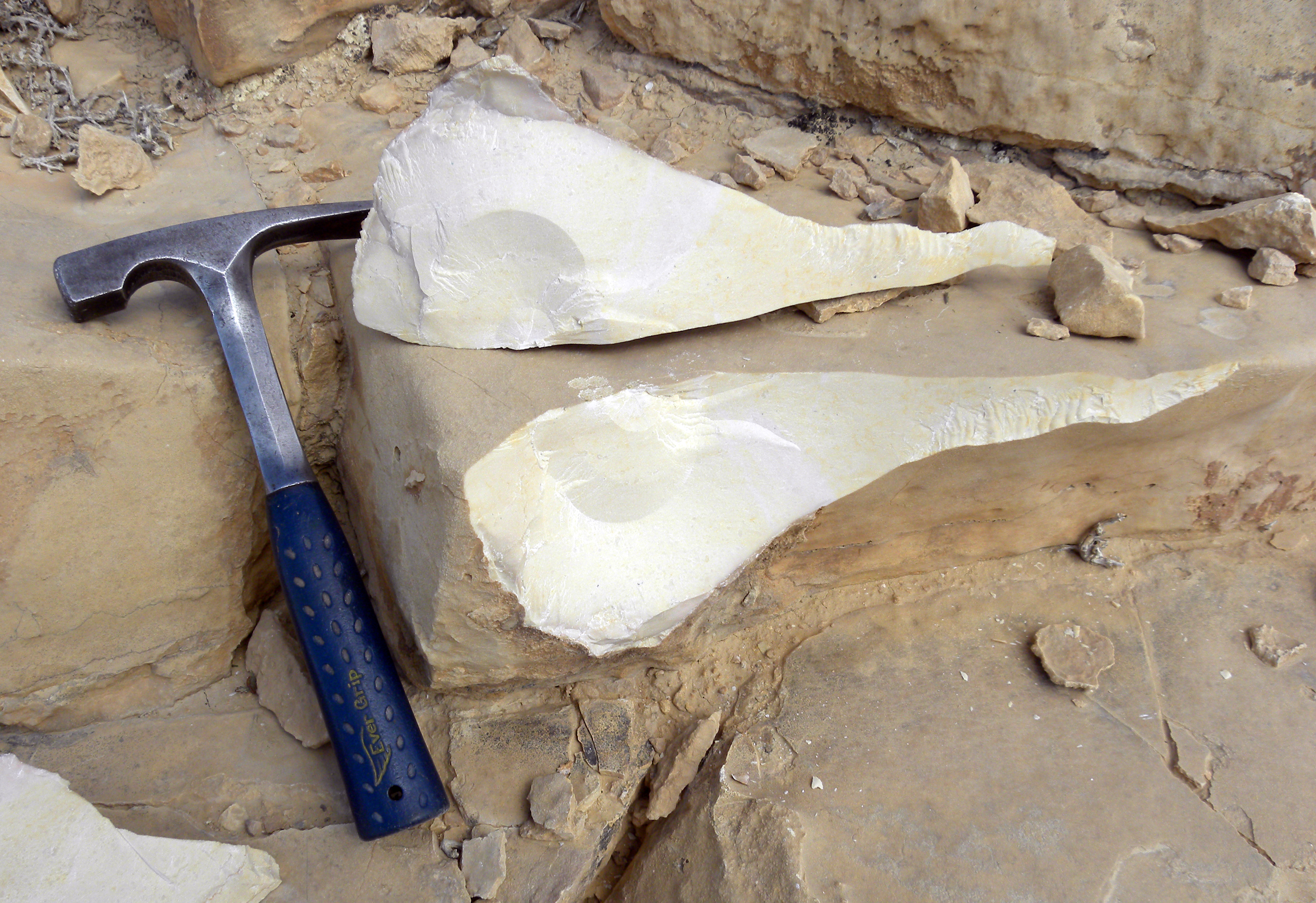
Meleke in the Gerofit Formation (Turonian) near Makhtesh Ramon, southern Israel

High quality meleke limestone has been found wherever excavations in the Church of the Holy Sepulchre have reached bedrock. Beginning in about the seventh or eighth century BCE, the area where the church is now located was a large quarry, with the city of Jerusalem lying to the southeast. Traces of the quarry have been found not only in the church area, but also in excavations conducted nearby in the 1960s and 1970s by Kathleen Kenyon in the Muristan enclave of Jerusalem's Christian Quarter, and by Ute Lux, in the nearby Church of the Redeemer. Meleke stone was chiseled out in squarish blocks and partially cut ashlars still attached to the bedrock after being left by the workers were found. East of St. Helena's Chapel in the Holy Sepulchre Church, the quarry was over 40 feet deep and the earth and ash therein contained Iron Age II pottery, from about the seventh century BCE.

According to Virgilio C. Corbo, professor of archaeology at the Studium Biblicum Franciscanum in Jerusalem, the quarry continued to be used until the first century BCE, at which time it was filled, and covered with a layer of reddish-brown soil mixed with stone flakes from the ancient quarry. It became a garden or orchard, where cereals, fig, carob, and olive trees were grown. It also served as a cemetery, and at least four tombs dating from this period have been found, including a typical kokh tomb thought to be that of Nicodemus and Joseph of Arimathea.

A salvage excavation conducted by the Israeli Antiquities Authority in June 2006 in the Sanhedriya neighborhood of Jerusalem exposed another ancient masonry meleke quarry. Larger than the area excavated, the quarry abutted onto the southern end of the Second Temple period underground burial complex of the Tombs of the Sanhedrin, between which extensive ancient quarries had previously been discovered.

The quarry seems to have been in operation in the Roman period, though precise dating was difficult because the quarrying debris was devoid of coins and potsherds, and modern debris had entered the site. A few pottery fragments from the end of the first century BCE to the first century CE found on the bottom of the quarry units formed the basis for the dating put forward, and the quarry's proximity to the Sanhedrin tombs of the Second Temple period has also led archaeologists to assume it was in use during that time.

The exposed quarry is just one of a number of ancient quarries discovered in the Sanhedriya-Mahanayim region whose stones were utilized in the public construction of Jerusalem.

== See also ==
- List of types of limestone
- Jerusalem stone
- Limepit
