= Kazım Ergin =

Turkish engineering academic (1915–2002)

- Ergin in 2001
- Born: May 21, 1915; Gaziantep, Turkey
- Died: November 24, 2002 (aged 87); Istanbul, Turkey
- Education: Istanbul University; Bergakademie Freiberg; Massachusetts Institute of Technology; California Institute of Technology
- Awards: "TÜBİTAK Service Award"

Kazim Ergin (May 21, 1915 – November 24, 2002) was a Turkish geophysicist.

== Early years ==
Ergin was born on May 21, 1915, in Gaziantep, in southeastern Turkey. He completed his primary, secondary and high school education in Gaziantep under difficult conditions, with many interruptions due to the French occupation of the city during World War I. After completing his basic education, he received his B.Sc. degree in mathematics at Istanbul University. In June 1937, he was sent by the Mineral Research and Exploration Institute of Turkey (MTA) to study mining, metallurgical and petroleum engineering at Bergakademie Freiberg near Dresden, Germany. His studies were interrupted by World War II, but he moved to the United States to continue his education. He studied geophysics and geology at the Massachusetts Institute of Technology (MIT) and received his B.Sc. degree in geological sciences there on December 18, 1942. In the meantime, he began studying for his M.Sc. degree with Beno Gutenberg at the California Institute of Technology (Caltech) and obtained the degree in 1943. After Ergin received his master's degree, Gutenberg suggested he study seismic wave reflection and refraction at the rock-water interface for a Ph.D. degree. The final PhD examination, on 10 May 1950, was conducted by committee members, including Prof. Beno Gutenberg (supervisor), Prof. Hugo Benioff, Prof. Charles Richter, Prof. Arthur Erdélyi, Prof. James A. Noble, Prof. Morgan Ward. Unfortunately, MTA Institute requested his return to Turkey because his services were needed.

== Career ==
Ergin worked at Caltech as a research fellow for a while and then returned to Turkey. He was appointed director of the Department of Geology at MTA Institute in March 1953, and served until 1956 on various important projects. On June 15, 1956, he was appointed professor of geophysics at the Faculty of Mining Engineering of Istanbul Technical University (ITU), where he established a modern department of geophysical engineering and trained many students over the years.

Ergin died aged 87 in Istanbul on November 24, 2002. He was a recipient of the TÜBİTAK Service Award.
