= Istanbul Technical University Faculty of Mines =

ITU Faculty of Mines
- İTÜ Maden Fakültesi
- Type: Public university
- Established: March 1, 1953; 73 years ago
- Dean: Prof. Dr. Mustafa Kumral
- Location: Istanbul, Turkey
- Campus: Urban
- Website: www.mines.itu.edu.tr

ITU Faculty of Mines (Turkish: İTÜ Maden Fakültesi), located in Maslak campus, is one of the faculties in Istanbul Technical University, which has five departments.Among the notable faculty of the ITU Faculty of Mines are Galip Sağıroğlu, İhsan Ketin, Aykut Barka, Celal Şengör and Kazım Ergin.

The faculty's departments are:

- Mining engineering
- Geological engineering
- Petroleum and natural gas engineering
- Geophysical engineering
- Mineral processing engineering

== History ==
The Faculty of Mines was established March 1, 1953 in Istanbul. In its first years, the faculty was composed of mainly Turkish and German professors, and its program was similar to those days' famous mining schools such as RWTH Aachen University, Clausthal University of Technology then in West Germany and Freiberg University of Mining and Technology in East Germany. The Faculty of Mines accepted its first students in 1953 with a faculty of eleven scientists.
