= Engineers and Geoscientists British Columbia =

Engineers and Geoscientists British Columbia (the business name of the Association of Professional Engineers and Geoscientists of the Province of British Columbia) regulates and governs professional engineers, professional geoscientists, and firms that offer engineering and geoscience services in the Province of British Columbia, Canada under the authority of the Professional Governance Act.

With over 40,000 registrants, Engineers and Geoscientists BC is one of the largest regulatory bodies in British Columbia. Individuals and firms licensed by Engineers and Geoscientists BC are the only persons or entities permitted by law to undertake and assume responsibility for engineering and geoscience projects in the province of BC. Engineers and Geoscientists BC is a constituent member of Engineers Canada and Geoscientists Canada.

== History ==
Following the second collapse of the Quebec Bridge, in 1919 provinces throughout Canada began regulating engineers through legislation. The Engineering Profession Act of 1920 created the Association of Professional Engineers of the Province of British Columbia to regulate and license professional engineers. In 1990, geoscience became a regulated profession in British Columbia, and the association was expanded to become The Association of Professional Engineers and Geoscientists of the Province of British Columbia.

On August 22, 2017, APEGBC rebranded as Engineers and Geoscientists British Columbia with a new logo to accompany the rebranding.

The organization is charged with protecting the public interest by setting and maintaining high academic, experience and professional practice standards for all registrants.

== Organization ==
Engineers and Geoscientists BC is governed by a Board of elected registrants and government appointees. Engineers and Geoscientists BC's Board is accountable to the public through the Ministry of Post-Secondary Education and Future Skills, under the Office of the Superintendent of Professional Governance, for both the governance and management of the organization.
