= Light Metal Age =

Trade magazine

- Cover of April 2010 issue of Light Metal Age
- Categories: science, materials, engineering
- Frequency: Bimonthly
- Circulation: 4,000
- Publisher: Ann Marie Fellom
- First issue: May 1943
- Company: Fellom Publishing
- Country: United States
- Based in: South San Francisco, California
- Language: English
- Website: www.lightmetalage.com
- ISSN: 0024-3345

Light Metal Age is a technical trade magazine exclusively devoted to primary production, secondary production, and semi-fabrication of light metals, specifically aluminum, titanium, magnesium, beryllium, and their alloys. However, the main editorial emphasis is aluminum.

Published bimonthly by Fellom Publishing, Light Metal Age is distributed worldwide to primary and secondary smelters; casthouses; extrusion operations; rolling mills; sheet, rod, and wire mills; and foundries. Recipients are executives, general managers, plant managers, technicians, metallurgists, chemists, and engineers responsible for fabrication, production, and operations in this industry.

== History ==
Light Metal Age was founded in Chicago, Illinois in 1943 by Roy Fellom, Jr., owner of Fellom Publishing. Roy Fellom predicted that there would be an increased use of light metals, especially aluminum. In the first issue of Light Metal Age in May 1943, he wrote a dedication explaining that the magazine was created to "herald the new LIGHT METAL ERA which shall see these most abundant basic metals brought to the service of man in all the common uses where metal is required." In 1955, Roy Fellom moved the company from Chicago to San Francisco, California, where it remained until 1989 when the headquarters was moved to South San Francisco, where it is now located.

Roy Fellom was recognized for his dedication to promoting the light metals industry via Light Metal Age in 1992 with the Maurice H. Roberts Award of Excellence, presented at the Fifth International Aluminum Extrusion Technology Seminar (ET ’92).

In 2000, Light Metal Age was named the official publication of the Seventh International Aluminum Extrusion Technology Seminar (ET 2000), and was again named the official publication for the subsequent seminars, ET ’04 and ET ’08.

Roy Fellom, Jr. died in 1993. Light Metal Age is carried on by his daughter, Ann Marie Fellom.

In 2006, Light Metal Age donated Roy Fellom's extensive library of 692 books covering all topics of light metal production to the Paul V. Galvin Library at the Illinois Institute of Technology (IIT) in Chicago.

== Content ==
=== Articles ===
Light Metal Age covers primary production and semi-fabrication of light metals, mainly aluminum, but also titanium and magnesium, as well as associated light metal processes and equipment, including DC casting, anodizing, furnaces and melting, degassing and filtration, sawing, and handling. Articles are technical in nature, with the aim of being of practical use to executives, general managers, plant managers, technicians, metallurgists, chemists, and engineers working in the light metal industry.

=== Departments ===
- Light Metal World – offers current statistical data on aluminum production in the United States and Canada, as well as a short article involving light metals in the world
- Contracts & Expansions – light metals industry news
- News (specific focus) – industry news published on alternating topics, such as Primary Aluminum, Aluminum Extrusion, Flat Rolled Aluminum, Titanium, etc.
- Lightweight Matters (occasional) – a lighter, applications-focused article
- International Patent Calendar – a list of recent patents relevant to the light metals industry
- International Aluminum Abstracts – a list of abstracts for research and technical papers
- Conference Calendar – a list of upcoming conferences relevant to the light metals industry
- Personalities & Plants – news items covering appointments of new personnel and awards received by individuals or companies

=== Directories ===
Light Metal Age also publishes four directories catering to the aluminum industry: the Directory of Primary Aluminum Equipment Manufacturers and Suppliers, the Directory of Aluminum Extrusion Equipment Manufacturers and Suppliers, the Directory of Secondary Aluminum Equipment Manufacturers and Suppliers, and the Directory of Flat Rolled Aluminum Equipment Manufacturers and Suppliers. These directories are published in the February, April, August, and December issues, respectively, as well as online for free.

=== Smelter Lists ===
Light Metal Age produces two charts that present the nameplate and shutdown capacities of smelters by country. The lists, "Primary Aluminum Smelters of the World" and "Secondary Aluminum Smelters of the World", are updated at least once a year to keep the information up to date.

=== Online Exclusives ===
Light Metal Age offers articles via its website as free pdf downloads. These articles present technical information considered to be of practical value to those involved in light metal production and processing.

=== Article Archives ===
In addition to its bimonthly issues, Light Metal Age publishes focused compilations of articles from the magazine's 68 years of publication, including the Titanium Article Archive (November 1945-August 2009) and the Magnesium Article Archive (May 1943-May 2009). Archives are periodically updated to incorporate recently published articles.
