= Dorsum Cloos =

Wrinkle ridge on the Moon

Dorsum Cloos is a wrinkle-ridge at 1.0°N 91.0°E in Mare Smythii on the Moon. It is 103 km long and was named after German geologist Hans Cloos in 1976.
