= Association of Professional Geoscientists of Ontario =

Professional organization of Canada

Professional Geoscientists Ontario (PGO), the registered business name of the Association of Professional Geoscientists of Ontario (APGO), governs the practice of geoscientists in the province of Ontario, Canada.

== Organisation ==
The Professional Geoscientists Act, 2000 received Royal Assent on June 23, 2000 and established the Association of Professional Geoscientists of Ontario. PGO governs the practice of professional geoscience in Ontario and reports to the Minister of Energy, Northern Development and Mines. The legislation protects the public and investors by establishing a regulated association of geoscientists with the power to admit only qualified persons, to encourage continuing professional competence, to discipline members for professional misconduct and to prevent unqualified individuals from practising.

The legislation brings Ontario geoscientists to the same level of standards and accountability as in British Columbia, Alberta, Saskatchewan, Manitoba, Northwest Territories, Nunavut, Quebec, New Brunswick, Nova Scotia and Newfoundland.

PGO establishes and administers registration requirements, conducts complaint reviews and a discipline process, establishes practice standards and enforces reserve practice and title provisions in the Act. As a member of the Canadian Council of Professional Geoscientists (CCPG), the association works to facilitate transferability and mobility of professional geoscientists between Ontario and other provinces/territories, as required by the Interprovincial Agreement on Mobility implemented July 2001.

The Province of Ontario requires registration with PGO of anyone wishing to practise geoscience, or already practising geoscience and using the professional designation of the profession (P.Geo., P.Geol., P. Geoph., G.P., or géo.), or otherwise representing themselves to the public as a professional geoscientist in Ontario.

Professional geoscience is defined as any activity that requires the knowledge, understanding and application of the principles of geoscience and that concerns safeguarding the welfare of the public, including the life, health, and property of individuals and of the natural environment.

== See also ==
- List of geoscience organizations
