= Light metal =

Metals with low densities

A light metal is any metal of relatively low density. These may be pure elements, but more commonly are metallic alloys. Lithium and then potassium are the two lightest metallic elements.

The elements magnesium, aluminium and titanium alloys are light metals of significant commercial importance. Their densities of 1.7, 2.7 and 4.5 g/cm^{3} range from 19 to 56% of the densities of other structural metals, such as iron (7.9 g/cm^{3}) and copper (8.9 g/cm^{3}).

== See also ==
- Heavy metals
- List of elements by density
