= Association of Professional Engineers and Geoscientists of Saskatchewan =

Geoscientific regulatory body in Saskatchewan, Canada

The Association of Professional Engineers and Geoscientists of Saskatchewan (APEGS) is the regulatory body for professional engineers and geoscientists in the Canadian province of Saskatchewan. It is a member of Engineers Canada. Its authority is granted under the provincial legislation entitled The Engineering and Geoscience Professions Act.
