= Bulletin of Engineering Geology and the Environment =

- Discipline: Engineering geology
- Language: English
- Edited by: Louis Wong, Arindam Basu

Publication details
- History: 1970–present
- Publisher: Springer Science+Business Media on behalf of the International Association for Engineering Geology and the Environment
- Frequency: Monthly
- Impact factor: 4.298 (2020)

Standard abbreviations
- ISO 4: Bull. Eng. Geol. Environ.

Indexing
- ISSN: 1435-9529 (print); 1435-9537 (web)
- OCLC no.: 768021032

Links
- Journal homepage

The Bulletin of Engineering Geology and the Environment is a peer-reviewed scientific journal covering research in the field of engineering geology. It is the official journal of the International Association for Engineering Geology and the Environment and published on their behalf by Springer Science+Business Media. According to the Journal Citation Reports, the journal has a 2020 impact factor of 4.298.

== Subjects covered ==
Areas of research frequently published in Bulletin of Engineering Geology and the Environment include: study and solution of engineering and environmental problems arising from the interaction between geology and the activities of humanity; geomorphology, structure, stratigraphy, lithology, and groundwater conditions of geological formations; characterization of the mineralogical, physico-geomechanical, chemical and hydraulic properties of earth materials involved in construction; resource recovery and environmental change; assessment of the mechanical and hydrological behavior of soil and rock masses; prediction of changes to the above properties with time; determination of the parameters to be considered in analyzing the stability of engineering works and earth masses; maintenance of the environmental condition and properties of the terrain.

== See also ==
- Engineering Geology (journal)
