= Engineers Canada =

National organization devoted to engineering in Canada

- Formerly: Dominion of Canada Council of Professional Engineers (1936–1959); Canadian Council of Professional Engineers (1959–2013)
- Founded: 1936
- Website: www.engineerscanada.ca

Engineers Canada (French: Ingénieurs Canada) is the national organization of the 12 provincial and territorial associations that regulate the practice of engineering in Canada. Engineers Canada serves these associations, which are its sole members, by delivering national programs for standards of engineering education, professional qualifications and professional practice.

The organization was established in 1936 as the Dominion of Canada Council of Professional Engineers. In the late 1950s, the name became the Canadian Council of Professional Engineers (French: Conseil canadien des ingénieurs). In 2007, the organization operated under the business name Engineers Canada. In 2014, the official name was changed to Engineers Canada.

In addition to being the voice of the engineering regulators in national and international affairs, Engineers Canada coordinates the development of national policies, positions and guidelines on behalf of the engineering profession. It also promotes greater understanding of the nature, role and contribution of professional engineers and engineering to society, and undertakes federal government relations and national media relations on behalf of, and in consultation with, the provincial and territorial associations.

== Governance ==
Engineers Canada is governed by a board of directors. Each engineering regulator has one or more seats on the board on a representation by population basis. All board members are volunteers. The work of the board is supported by Engineers Canada staff.

== Canadian Engineering Accreditation Board ==
The Canadian Engineering Accreditation Board (CEAB) is a committee of the Engineers Canada Board. CEAB accredits Canadian undergraduate engineering programs that meet the profession's education standards. Graduates of those programs are deemed by the profession to have the required academic qualifications to be licensed as professional engineers in Canada.

CEAB is also involved in assessing the equivalency of the accreditation systems used in other nations relative to the Canadian system, and monitoring the accreditation systems employed by the engineering bodies which have entered into mutual recognition agreements with Engineers Canada.

== International activities ==
Engineers Canada negotiates education-based international mutual recognition agreements on behalf of Canada's engineering profession. These agreements mainly recognize the equivalency of the accreditation systems (engineering education) used in other countries with the Canadian system. Engineers who are graduates of an accredited or recognized engineering program offered in a country where an Engineers Canada agreement applies are generally considered to meet the academic requirements to be licensed as professional engineers in Canada, making it easier for Engineers Canada's members to evaluate the academic credentials of international engineering graduates and for Canadian engineers to work and be licensed as engineers in other countries.

Engineers Canada has signed agreements with engineering organizations in other countries. In most cases, these organizations are based in countries where the accreditation of engineering programs is a key foundation for the practice of engineering; high academic standards of engineering education exist and are required for registration; and the engineering profession is well regarded either through statute or convention. For example, Engineers Canada has signed mutual recognition agreements of qualified/licensed engineers with both Hong Kong and Australia.

Engineers Canada has also negotiated a recognition agreement on full professional practice, the NAFTA Mutual Recognition Document, to support greater mobility for engineers from Canada, Texas and Mexico, and has developed a national register of qualified Canadian engineers as part of the Asia Pacific Economic Cooperation (APEC) Engineer Register initiative. An implementation protocol to implement the NAFTA document is currently being developed. The APEC Register initiative sets out criteria for the creation of national registers of qualified engineers, which would facilitate the negotiation of bilateral mobility agreements between participating signatories.

Engineers Canada has also signed a memorandum of understanding with the Colegio Federado de Ingenieros y Arquitectos de Costa Rica that provides assurance to the Colegio's stakeholders that Engineers Canada will continue to work with them on the development of their accreditation system. Such cooperation will enhance Costa Rica's accreditation system, improve the quality assurance in the Costa Rican engineering faculties and therefore provide better professionals to serve our communities.

Engineers Canada has participated in the discussion about climate change, has developed an Engineers Canada Infrastructure Climate Risk Protocol and has been a delivery partner of Government of Canada on building capacity to assess infrastructure vulnerability of Honduras. This was one of Canada's fast-start financing projects on climate change.

== Agreements ==
- Mutual Recognition Agreement between ABET and the Canadian Council of Professional Engineers
- Washington Accord
- Mutual Recognition Agreement for Practice as a Professional Engineer (The Parties: Commission des titres d'ingénieur (CTI) for France, Conseil National des Ingénieurs et Scientifiques de France (CNISF), and the Canadian Council of Professional Engineers (CCPE) for Canada
- APEC Engineers Register
- Mutual Recognition of Qualified/Licensed Engineers by Jurisdictions of Canada and Hong Kong to Facilitate Mobility
- Mutual Recognition of Qualified/Licensed Engineers by the Jurisdictions of Australia and Canada to Facilitate Mobility

== Members (Engineering Regulators) ==
The Constituent Members of Engineers Canada are the 10 provincial and 2 territorial organization charged with the administration of the legislation that regulates professional engineering within their jurisdiction.

- Engineers and Geoscientists British Columbia (EGBC)
- Association of Professional Engineers and Geoscientists of Alberta (APEGA)
- Engineers Geoscientists Manitoba
- Engineers and Geoscientists New Brunswick
- Association of Professional Engineers and Geoscientists of Saskatchewan (APEGS)
- Engineers Nova Scotia
- Engineers PEI
- Engineers Yukon
- Northwest Territories and Nunavut Association of Professional Engineers and Geoscientists (NAPEG)
- Ordre des ingénieurs du Québec (OIQ)
- Professional Engineers and Geoscientists of Newfoundland and Labrador (PEGNL)
- Professional Engineers Ontario (PEO)

== Fellow (FEC) ==
In addition, the Fellowship of Engineers Canada consists of individuals who have given noteworthy service to the engineering profession in Canada.
