= İhsan Ketin =

Turkish geologist (1914–1995)

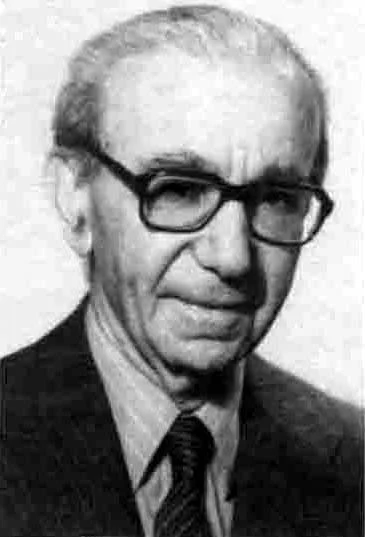
- Born: 10 April 1914; Kayseri, Ottoman Empire
- Died: 16 December 1995 (aged 81)
- Education: Berlin University (BS); Bonn University (PhD)
- Known for: Study of the North Anatolian fault
- Awards: Gustav-Steinmann-Medaille (1988)
- Scientific career
- Fields: Geology
- Workplaces: Istanbul Technical University
- Doctoral advisor: Hans Cloos

İhsan Ketin (10 April 1914 – 16 December 1995) was a Turkish earth scientist.

== Early years ==
He was born in 1914 in the Central Anatolian town of Kayseri, located at the foothills of Mt. Aergus (the volcano Erciyes). He won a state scholarship to study natural sciences abroad, as part of Mustafa Kemal Atatürk's plans of modernizing the newly formed Republic of Turkey. He started his undergraduate studies in Natural Sciences at Berlin University in 1934, and subsequently completed his doctorate at Bonn University in 1938 under the supervision of Hans Cloos, thus becoming the first native of Turkey with a doctorate degree in geology in the Republic of Turkey. Ketin returned to Turkey in 1938, and started his career as assistant professor at the Geological Institute of Istanbul Technical University.

== Scientific career ==
The North Anatolian fault became active with the Tercan earthquake on 21 November 1939, followed by the Erzincan earthquake on 28 and 29 December 1939, which resulted in approximately 32,000 deaths. Ketin went to the field with other geologists to map the surface breaks and damage. After Ketin published a paper on the North Anatolian fault, he was awarded the Gustav-Steinmann-Medaille by the Geologische Vereinigung e.V. in the journal where the paper appeared.

In 1953, Ketin accepted a new position, the chair in General Geology in the Faculty of Mines at Istanbul Technical University. In 1953, he published his well-known comparison of the San Andreas and North Anatolian faults. Ketin contributed four major papers to the International Tectonic Map of Europe, published in 1960, in which he portrays Turkey as a dominantly asymmetric orogen, accreted from north to south. His tectonic and kinematic views formed the basis for many large-scale tectonic models in Turkey.

Ketin retired from active teaching in 1983, but remained in the Department of Geology as professor emeritus until his death in 1995.

Ketin was also admired by his students as having a great capacity for memory; one of his students, Celal Sengör, described him as a "hafiz" able to recite all Koran verses in both Arabic and Turkish.

== Publications ==
Selected publications of Ihsan Ketin

- 1940, Über die Tektonik und den Vulkanismus der Gegend von Bad Bertrich (inaugural dissertation). Jahrb. Reichsstelle Bodenforsch. 60, 49–98.
- 1946, Geologische Untersuchungen auf der Halbinsel Kapıdağ und Inseln im Marmara Meer, Türkei. Istanbul Univ. Fak. Mecm. B XI, 69–83.
- 1948, Über die tektonisch-mechanischen Folgerungen aus den grossen anatolischen Erdbeben des letzten Dezenniums. Geol. Rundsch. 36, 77–83.
- 1954 (with Roesli, F.), Makroseismische Untersuchungen über das nordwestanatolische Erdbeben vom 18 März 1953. Eclogae Geol. Helv. 46, 187–208.
- 1956, On the geology of Yozgat region and tectonic features of the Central Anatolian Massif (Kırşehir Crystallines). Geol. Soc. Turkey Bull. 6, 29–40.
- 1956, Über einige messbare Überschiebungen in Anatolien. Berg. Hüttenmänn. Mon.heft. 101, 22–24.
- 1957, Kuzey Anadolu Deprem Fayı. Istanbul Tech. Univ. Derg. 15, 49–52.
- 1959, Über Alter und Art der kristallinen Gesteine und Erzlagerstätten in Zentral Anatolien. Berg. Hüttenmännn. Mon.heft. 104, 163–169.
- 1961, Über die magmatischen Erscheinungen in der Türkei. Geol. Soc. Turkey Bull. 7, 16–32.
- 1966, Tectonic units of Anatolia (Asia Minor). Min. Res. Explor. Inst. Turkey (MTA) Bull. 66, 23–34.
- 1969, Über die nordanatolische Horizontalverschiebung. Min. Res. Explor. Inst. Turkey (MTA) Bull. 72, 1–28.
- 1976, San Andreas ve Kuzey Anadolu Fayları arasında bir karşılaştırma (A comparison between the San Andreas and the North Anatolian faults). Geol. Soc. Turkey Bull. 19, 149–154.
- 1980 (with Şengör, A.M.C. and Yılmaz, Y.), Remnants of pre-late jurassic ocean in northern Turkey: fragments of Permian-Triassic Paleo Tethys. Geol. Soc. Am. Bull. 91, 599–609.
- 1983, Türkiye Jeolojisine Genel Bir Bakış. Istanbul Technical University Publications, Istanbul, 595 pp.
- 1984, Türkiye’nin bindirmeli ve naplı yapısında yeni gelişmeler ve bir örnek Uludağ Masifi (New developments in the overthrust-nappe tectonics of Turkey with the example of Uludağ massif). In: Ercan, T., Ça layan, M.A., Ketin Simpozyumu Feb. 20–21, Geological Society of Turkey, Ankara, pp. 19–36.
- 1989 (with Güner, G.) Istanbul Bölgesinde Karbonifer yaşlı Trakya Formasyonu’nun yapısal özelliği (Structural peculiarity of the Carboniferous Thracian Formation in the Istanbul area). Mühendis. Jeol. Bul. 11, 13–18.
- 1995, The geological evolution of the volcanic complex of Mt. Erciyes. In: Güler, O. (Ed.), Antik Çağ Ikonografisinde Erciyes. stanbul Arekoloji ve Sanat Yayınları, pp. 107–115.
