= Bibliography and Index of Geology =

- Language: English

Publication details
- Publisher: American Geosciences Institute and Geological Society of America

Standard abbreviations
- ISO 4: Bibliogr. Index Geol.

Indexing
- ISSN: 0098-2784

The Bibliography and Index of Geology is divided into Bibliography and index of North American geology and Bibliography and index of geology exclusive of North America. These, and other print publications, are now available electronically in the GeoRef database.

== History ==
In 1896, the United States Geological Survey released N.H. Darton's 1045-page Catalogue and index of contributions to North American geology, 1732-1891 and also commenced an incremental publication of Fred Boughton Weeks' serial work Bibliography and index of North American geology, paleontology, petrology, and mineralogy for 1892 and 1893. This was followed the same year by individual volumes for 1894 (141 pages) and 1895 (130 pages), then the volume for 1896 was released in 1897 with 152 pages. This continued until in 1909, it became the Bibliography of North American geology for 1906 and 1907, with a subject index by Weeks and J.M. Nickles. In 1933, the Geological Society of America began publication of Bibliography and Index of Geology, and in 1969 it became a joint publication with the American Geological Institute.

== See also ==
- GeoRef
