= Quarterly Journal of Engineering Geology & Hydrogeology =

Journal

- Discipline: Geology, civil engineering
- Language: English

Publication details
- History: 1967–present
- Publisher: The Geological Society of London (United Kingdom)
- Frequency: Quarterly
- Impact factor: 1.897 (2019)

Standard abbreviations
- ISO 4: Q. J. Eng. Geol. Hydrogeol.

Indexing
- CODEN: QJEGB8
- ISSN: 1470-9236
- LCCN: 00253261
- OCLC no.: 43522169

Links
- Journal homepage

The Quarterly Journal of Engineering Geology & Hydrogeology is a quarterly peer-reviewed scientific journal published by the Geological Society of London. The journal covers engineering geology and hydrogeology, including civil engineering, mining practice, and water resources. Coverage includes topics from other disciplines related to this journal's focus such as applied geophysics, environmental geology, contaminated land, waste management, land-use planning, geotechnics, rock mechanics, geomaterials, and geological hazards.

== Abstracting and indexing ==
This journal is abstracted and indexed by the Science Citation Index, Current Contents/Engineering, Computing & Technology, and the Chemical Abstracts Service/CASSI.
