= Alper Yilmaz =

Computer scientist and photogrammetrist

- Education: Yıldız Technical University (BS); Istanbul Technical University (ME); University of Central Florida (MS, PhD)
- Known for: Object tracking research
- Awards: ASPRS Photogrammetric (Fairchild) Award (2025); Fellow, American Society for Photogrammetry and Remote Sensing (2021)
- Scientific career
- Fields: Photogrammetry, computer vision, machine learning, geospatial intelligence
- Workplaces: Ohio State University
- Doctoral advisor: Mubarak Shah

Alper Yilmaz is a computer scientist and photogrammetric engineer. He is a professor of civil, environmental and geodetic engineering at Ohio State University, where he holds a courtesy appointment in computer science and engineering. His research covers photogrammetry and computer vision alongside machine learning and geospatial intelligence. He is known for his work on visual object tracking.

Yilmaz was editor-in-chief of Photogrammetric Engineering & Remote Sensing, the journal of the American Society for Photogrammetry and Remote Sensing (ASPRS), from 2016 to 2024, and president of Technical Commission II (Photogrammetry) of the International Society for Photogrammetry and Remote Sensing (ISPRS) from 2022 to 2026.

== Education ==
He earned a BS in computer science and engineering from Yıldız Technical University in 1997 and an ME in computer engineering from Istanbul Technical University in 1999. After moving to the United States, he completed an MS (2001) and a PhD (2004) at the University of Central Florida. His doctoral advisor was Mubarak Shah.

== Career ==
From 2004 to 2006 he was a visiting assistant professor at the University of Central Florida. Yilmaz joined Ohio State University in 2006 and became a full professor in 2017. At Ohio State he directs the Photogrammetric Computer Vision Laboratory (PCVLab). He has supervised more than 20 doctoral dissertations.

As editor-in-chief, Yilmaz succeeded Russell G. Congalton. Under ISPRS bylaws, commission presidents are confirmed by the General Assembly for the four-year period between successive congresses. The statutes make the technical commissions responsible for the society's scientific work, and the delegates of the national member organizations hold the voting rights in the General Assembly. Yilmaz was also an associate editor of Computer Vision and Image Understanding (2014–2016) and Machine Vision and Applications (2006–2011).

== Research ==
His most cited work is the 2006 survey "Object tracking: A survey", written with Omar Javed and Mubarak Shah and published in ACM Computing Surveys. The survey grouped the visual tracking literature by how a method represents the tracked object, whether as a point, a kernel or a silhouette. Later work has addressed vision-based navigation for unmanned platforms operating without GPS, together with geospatial machine learning for scene understanding and anomaly detection in sensor data. Yilmaz holds several granted United States patents in geolocalization and image-based analysis.

== Honors and awards ==
In 2025 Yilmaz received the ASPRS Photogrammetric (Fairchild) Award. In 2021 he was elected a Fellow of ASPRS. His professional memberships include the National Academy of Inventors (2020) and the IEEE, where he is a senior member. Other honors include ASPRS Outstanding Service Awards (2022 and 2025), the ASPRS Presidential Citation (2019) and an ISPRS Certificate of Recognition (2026). In 2016 he received a special prize (特別賞) of the Masao Horiba Award from Horiba, Ltd. of Japan.

At Ohio State, Yilmaz was named University Innovator of the Year in 2020. The university also gave him the College of Engineering's Lumley Research Award (2012) and the Lumley Interdisciplinary Research Award (2015).

== Selected publications ==
Articles

- Yilmaz, Alper; Javed, Omar; Shah, Mubarak (2006). "Object tracking: A survey". ACM Computing Surveys. 38 (4). doi:10.1145/1177352.1177355.
- Yilmaz, Alper; Shah, Mubarak (2004). "Contour-based object tracking with occlusion handling in video acquired using mobile cameras". IEEE Transactions on Pattern Analysis and Machine Intelligence. 26 (11): 1531–1536. doi:10.1109/TPAMI.2004.96.
- Li, Qipeng; Zhuang, Yuan; Huai, Jianzhu; Chen, Yiwen; Yilmaz, Alper (2024). "An efficient point cloud place recognition approach based on transformer in dynamic environment". ISPRS Journal of Photogrammetry and Remote Sensing. 207: 14–26. doi:10.1016/j.isprsjprs.2023.11.013.
- Yusefi, Abdullah; Durdu, Akif; Yilmaz, Alper; Sungur, Cemil; Bozkaya, Furkan; Tığlıoğlu, Şeyda; Alver, Veli (2023). "A generalizable D-VIO and its fusion with GNSS/IMU for improved autonomous vehicle localization". IEEE Transactions on Intelligent Vehicles. doi:10.1109/TIV.2023.3316361.
- Yang, Luming; Liu, Hong; Calanche, A.; Gokcek, S.; Singh, V.; Sansoterra, N.; Akkaya, M.; Akkaya, B.; Yilmaz, Alper (2025). "Disrupting explicit encoding paradigms: property-interactive transformers decode TCR specificity beyond dataset biases". Briefings in Bioinformatics. doi:10.1093/bib/bbaf609.

Book chapters and reference works

- Porikli, Fatih; Yilmaz, Alper (2012). "Object tracking". In Shan, Caifeng; Porikli, Fatih; Xiang, Tao; Gong, Shaogang (eds.). Video Analytics for Business Intelligence. Springer. ISBN 978-3-642-28597-4.
- Yilmaz, Alper (2011). "Detecting and tracking the action content". In Salah, Albert Ali; Gevers, Theo (eds.). Computer Analysis of Human Behavior. Springer. pp. 41–68. ISBN 978-0-85729-993-2.
- Yilmaz, Alper (2009). "Active contours: Snakes". In Wah, Benjamin W. (ed.). Wiley Encyclopedia of Computer Science and Engineering. Vol. 1. John Wiley & Sons. ISBN 978-0-471-38393-2.
