= CMSC =

The acronym CMSC may refer to:

- Canon Medical Systems Corporation
- Chamber Music Society of Colombo
- Chicago Metropolitan Ski Council, see Wilmot Mountain
- Chicago Motorsports Council
- Chittagong Model School and College
- Chittagong Mohammedan Sporting Club
- Christa McAuliffe Space Education Center, Pleasant Grove, Utah
- Clearwater Marine Science Center, see Clearwater Marine Aquarium § History
- Columbia Memorial Space Center, Downey, California
- Coordinate Metrology Society Conference
