= B. L. Deekshatulu =

Indian academic

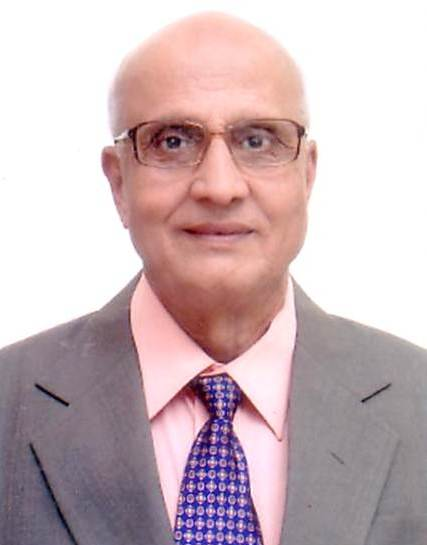
- Prof. Bulusu in 2013
- Born: 31 October 1936 (age 89); Orissa, India
- Education: Banaras Hindu University; Indian Institute of Science
- Awards: Padma Shri in 1991; NRDC invention awards 1986 and 1993; Bharata Ratna Sir M.Vishvesvaraya award in 1984
- Scientific career
- Fields: Digital Image Processing and Control Theory
- Workplaces: ISRO; Indian Institute of Science; National Institute of Technology, Warangal; IDBRT; IBM Thomas J. Watson Research Centre
- Doctoral advisor: H. N. Ramachandra Rao
- Doctoral students: N. Viswanadham

Bulusu Lakshmana Deekshatulu (born 31 October 1936, India) is an Indian academic who has made important contributions to Digital Image Processing and Control Theory. He is a Fellow of The World Academy of Sciences, Fellow of Indian National Science Academy, The National Academy of Sciences, India, Indian Academy of Sciences, Indian National Academy of Engineering, National Academy of Agricultural Sciences, and IEEE.

He was a recipient of Padma Shri conferred by the Government of India. He worked at the Indian Institute of Science as a Professor, National Remote Sensing Centre of Indian Space Research Organisation as a Director and Distinguished Scientist. He also worked as a Director, Centre for Space Science Technology Education in Asia & the Pacific - affiliated to UN-Dehradun as a Founding Director. He was the Chairman Board Governing Council of National Institute of Technology, Warangal.

He is currently the Chairman of Jawaharlal Nehru Technological University, College of Engineering, Hyderabad. He is also a Distinguished Fellow at the Institute for Development and Research in Banking Technology, Hyderabad.

== Education ==
- Bachelor of Science in Engineering, Banaras Hindu University
- Master in Engineering (Electrical Engineering), Indian Institute of Science
- PhD, Indian Institute of Science

== Research ==
He has contributed in the fields of Digital Image Processing, Remote Sensing, Control Systems, Artificial intelligence, Computer science, Computer vision, Machine learning, Game theory, Power systems, Pattern recognition, Neural networks. He designed and fabricated for the first time in India, gray scale and color drum scanners for computer picture processing that has won him NRDC Award.

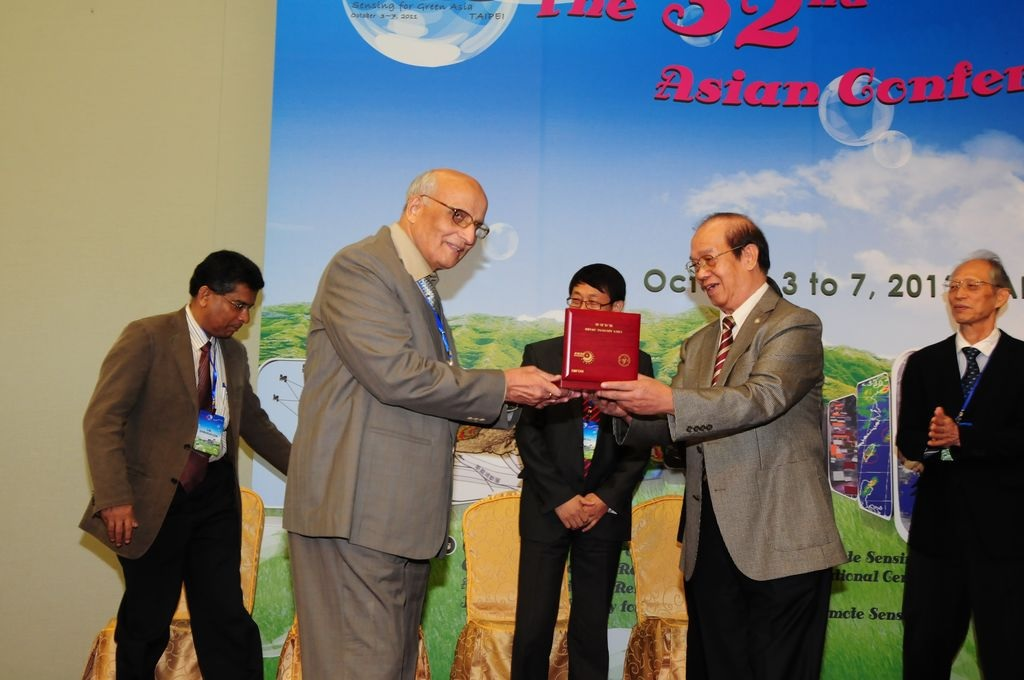
Deekshatulu receiving the CHEN Shupeng Award in Taipei, Taiwan, during 32nd Asian Conference on Remote Sensing on 3 October 2011

== Professional ==
Bulusu served as

- Chairman of Remote Sensing Applications Missions India 1987–1995.
- UN/FAO Consultant in 1981 & Senior Consultant in 1996 in Beijing
- Government representative in the UN/ESCAP/RSSP
- Visiting Scientist, IBM Thomas J. Watson Research Centre, York Town Heights, New York
- Visiting Scientist, Environmental Research Institute, Michigan, 1971–72
- Distinguished Fellow, IDRBT Hyderabad
- Chairman, Board of Governors (BoG), College of Engineering JNTUH, Hyderabad
- Govt. representative in Directors' Meetings & Inter Governmental Consultative Committee meetings from 1985–95
- Chairman, Indian Geosphere & Biosphere Programme (IGBP)
- Visiting Professor, School of Computer & Information Sciences, University of Hyderabad, 2002–2010

== Awards, honors, and fellowships ==
- Fellow IEEE
- Fellow of The Third World Academy of Sciences, Italy
- Distinguished Fellow IETE
- Distinguished Fellow of Astronautical Society of India
- Hon. Member Asian Association on Remote Sensing
- Fellow of Indian National Science Academy
- Fellow of Indian Academy of Sciences
- Fellow of Indian National Academy of Engineering
- Fellow of The National Academy of Sciences, India
- Fellow of National Academy of Agricultural Sciences
- Fellow of Computer Society of India
- Fellow of Indian Meteorological Society of India
- Fellow of Indian Geophysical Union, Hyderabad
- Fellow of Association of Exploration Geo-Physicis
- Fellow of Indian Society of Remote Sensing(ISRS)
- Fellow of Indian National Cartographic Association
- Fellow of Aeronautical Society of India
- Member of Indian Physics Association
- Best PhD thesis "Martin Foster" Medal by IISc, 1964
- Bhaskara Award by ISRS India
- "Bharat Ratna Sir M. Visveswaraya Award" for 'Outstanding Engineer' in 1984
- NRDC Invention Awards in January 1986 and in August 1993
- Dr. Biren Roy Space Science Award in 1988
- Padma Shri in January 1991
- Brahm Prakash Medal for significant contributions to Engineering Technology
- Om Prakash Bhasin Award for Science and Technology for 1995
- Sivananda Eminent Citizen Award in December 1998
- Boon Indrambarya Gold Medal by Thailand Remote Sensing and GIS Association in November 1999
- Aryabhatta Award by Astronautical Society of India
- Distinguished Alumni Award from IISc in 2006
- IEEE third Millennium Medal, 2000
- Asthana Vidwan Award by DUTTA Peetham, Mysore, 2010
- National Award for Ocean Science & Technology, MoES, Govt of India 2011
- Chen Shupeng Award from CCNRS & AARS, in Taipei in 2011
- Life Time Contribution Award from ACRS, Beijing in October 2009
- Life Time Achievement Award-2014 from IETE
- Life Time Achievement Award-2014 from Systems Society of India
- Life Time Achievement Award-2015 from INAE
- ISRO Outstanding Achievement Award-2012 from the Indian Space Research Organization
