= Qihao Weng =

Chinese-American scientist (born 1964)

- 翁齐浩
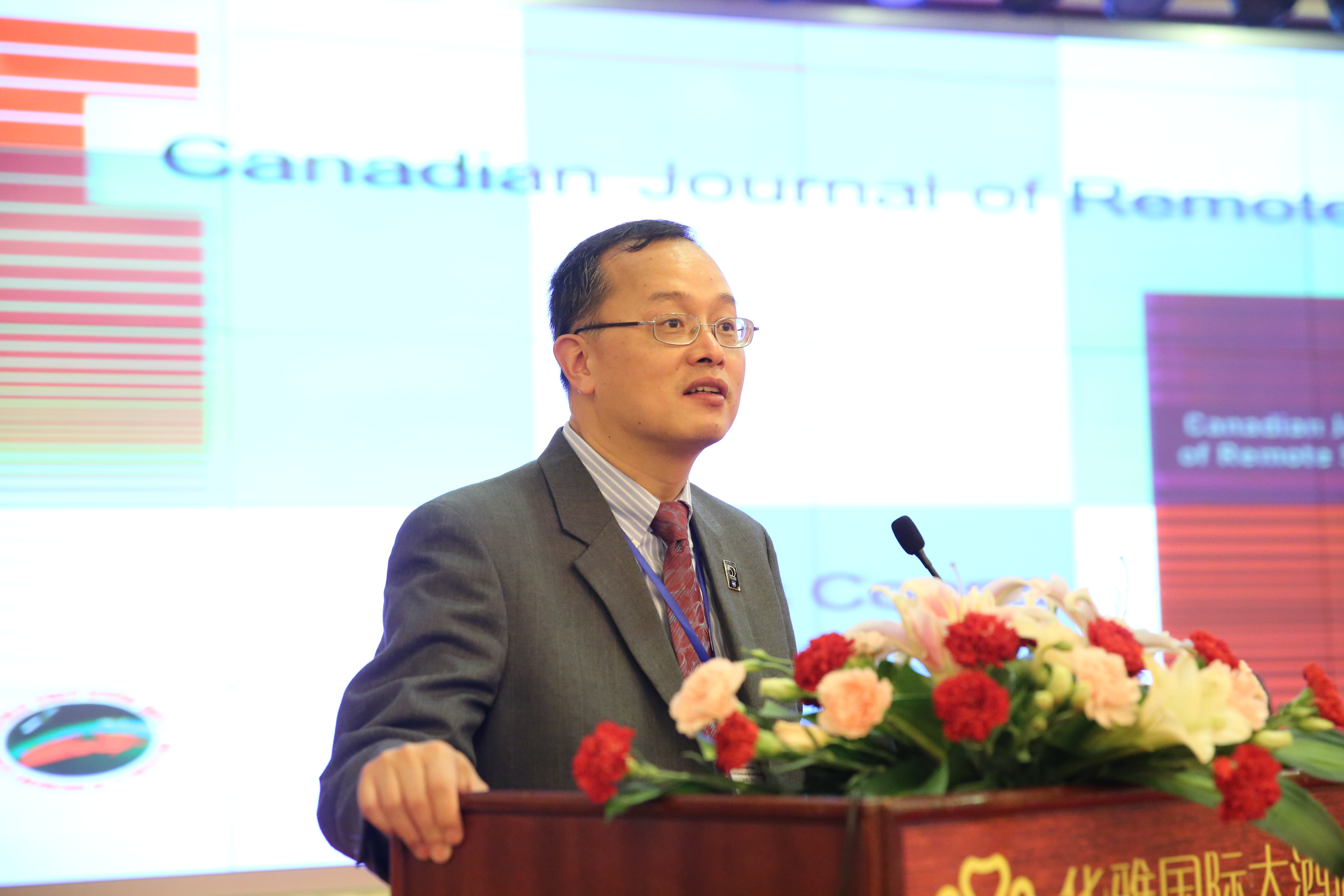
- Qihao Weng speaking at the Earth Observation and Remote Sensing Applications conference in 2014
- Citizenship: U.S.A.
- Scientific career
- Born: Fuzhou, China
- Education: South China Normal University (MS); University of Arizona (MA); University of Georgia (PhD)
- Awards: Fellow of the International Society for Photogrammetry and Remote Sensing (2026); Foreign Member of Academia Europaea (2021); Fellow of American Association of Geographers (2021); Fellow of Asia-Pacific Artificial Intelligence Association (2021); Fellow of the American Society for Photogrammetry and Remote Sensing (2020); Fellow of the American Association for the Advancement of Science (2019); Fellow of the Institute of Electrical and Electronics Engineers (2018)
- Workplaces: Hong Kong Polytechnic University; Indiana State University; University of Alabama
- Website: qihaoweng.net

Qihao Weng (born June 1964) is an American geographer, urban, environmental sustainability, and remote sensing scientist. He has been a Chair Professor at the Hong Kong Polytechnic University since July 2021, where he directs the Research Centre for Artificial Intelligence in Geomatics. Weng served as Director of the Center for Urban and Environmental Change (since July 2004) and as a professor of geography in the Department of Earth and Environmental Systems at Indiana State University, and became a professor emeritus in 2024.

Weng is currently the Lead of the Group on Earth Observations' (GEO) Global Urban Observation and Information Initiative. He is also an editor-in-chief of ISPRS Journal of Photogrammetry and Remote Sensing, the official peer-reviewed publication of the International Society for Photogrammetry and Remote Sensing. Additionally, he serves as the book series editor of Taylor & Francis Series in Remote Sensing Applications and Taylor & Francis Series in Imaging Science.

Weng is an elected foreign member of Academia Europaea (The Academy of Europe), a fellow of the American Association for the Advancement of Science, the Institute of Electrical and Electronics Engineers, the American Association of Geographers, the International Society for Photogrammetry and Remote Sensing, the American Society for Photogrammetry and Remote Sensing, and the Asia-Pacific Artificial Intelligence Association.

== Early life and education ==
Weng grew up in Fuzhou, a city in the southeastern coast of China. He received his undergraduate education in Geography from Minjiang University in 1984. After working as a middle school teacher for three years, he went to Guangzhou, studied and received a master's degree from South China Normal University in Physical Geography in 1990. In 1993, he came to the United States, obtained another master's degree from the University of Arizona in Geography in 1996, and finally, a PhD in Geography from the University of Georgia in 1999. His dissertation focused on the environmental impacts of land use and land cover change under the influence of rapid industrialization and urbanization. By using the Pearl River Delta of southern China as an example, his research examined the impacts of China's economic reform policy (since the late 1970s) on environmental and ecological processes. He approached this problem through an integrated approach of remote sensing, GIS, and spatial environmental modeling by utilizing satellite images, existing maps, statistics, and field survey data.

== Career ==
In 1999, Weng began teaching and researching at the University of Alabama. He successfully secured funding from the National Geographic Society to study Guangzhou's urban growth and its impact on local climate and air quality, and to model and monitor urban heat islands using satellite temperature measurements.

In 2001, he was appointed as a tenure-track assistant professor of geography at Indiana State University, becoming a tenured associate professor in 2005, and full professor in 2009. He was a National Director of the American Society for Photogrammetry and Remote Sensing, 2007–2010, representing the Western Great Lakes Region.

From December 2008 to December 2009, he worked at NASA Marshall Space Flight Center as a senior fellow. Some of his research has focused on urbanization effects on climate and surface energy balance.

In 2019, he was awarded a fellowship from the Japan Society for the Promotion of Science under the "JSPS Invitational Fellowships for Research in Japan" (Short-term S[E]). He worked at the Faculty of Life and Environmental Sciences, the University of Tsukuba.

He started working at the Hong Kong Polytechnic University in July 2021 as a Chair Professor of Geomatics and Artificial Intelligence, and was awarded a Global STEM Professorship.

Weng's work focuses on remote sensing applications to urban environmental and ecological systems, land-use and land-cover changes, urbanization impacts, spatial environmental modeling, and human-environment interactions. Through the invention of innovative algorithms, techniques, methods, and theories for urban remote sensing, his research advances the science and technology of remote sensing and satellite imaging in geographical and environmental applications.

He pioneered the development of novel models and methods to derive consistent biophysical parameters (including land surface temperature, vegetation index, impervious surfaces, and land use and land cover maps) from temporally irregularly-distributed satellite images, by fusing the strengths of polar-orbiting and geostationary satellites, and utilizing nighttime light imaging technology. These parameters are then used to explore long-term urbanization processes, environmental impacts of urbanization, and human-environment interactions in different geographical settings and stages from a local to a global scope.

His 2004 paper, Estimation of land surface temperature–vegetation abundance relationship for urban heat island studies, developed a methodology for estimating land surface temperature with satellite-derived measures of vegetation that has become a core technique for those investigating urban climates. Weng's seminal research on urban heat islands, landscape effects on land surface temperature, and urbanization processes opened a critical new frontier towards understanding and measuring novel environmental risks in rapidly growing urban regions. His research has also demonstrated that urban sprawl and warming are not an isolated phenomenon, but instead are coupled with other risk factors, such as infectious diseases.

Urban environments pose theoretical and technical challenges for many types of climate observations. For remote sensing methods to realize their potential as a tool to improve our ability to monitor these environments in a regular and routine manner requires detailed understanding of urban surface-atmosphere interactions, coupled with methods development. Weng's research has helped to bridge this gap between urban climate science and urban remote sensing. His work has incorporated atmospheric numerical modeling in urban thermal analysis, modeled anthropogenic heat flux using remote sensing, and incorporated dual and triple-source energy balance models to extract the fundamental surface energy balance fluxes that drive atmospheric processes in urban environments. These are the types of techniques required to develop a remote-sensing based approach that can provide better outputs to address the important themes of climate, health, energy use, hydrology and hazards assessments in urban areas.

== Awards and honors ==
- 2026 - Fellow, International Society for Photogrammetry and Remote Sensing.
- 2024 - AAG Wilbanks Prize for Transformational Research in Geography.
- 2024 - RSSG Lifetime Achievement Honor Award, Remote Sensing Specialty Group (RSSG) of American Association of Geographers (AAG).
- 2021 - Foreign Member, Academia Europaea (i.e., The Academy of Europe).
- 2021 - Fellow, American Association of Geographers (AAG).
- 2021 - Fellow, Asia-Pacific Artificial Intelligence Association (AAIA).
- 2020 - Fellow, American Society for Photogrammetry and Remote Sensing (ASPRS).
- 2020 - AAG Distinguished Scholarship Honors, American Association of Geographers (AAG).
- 2019 - Invitational Fellowships for Research in Japan (Short-term S[E]), Japan Society for the Promotion of Science.
- 2019 - Taylor & Francis Lifetime Achievement Award.
- 2019 - Fellow, American Association for the Advancement of Science (AAAS).
- 2018 - Fellow, Institute of Electrical and Electronics Engineers (IEEE).
- 2018 - Notable Alumnus of Minjiang University: received the title of Notable Alumnus and gave a speech representing the alumni at the university's 60th anniversary celebration, Oct 28, 2018.
- 2015 - Willard and Ruby S. Miller Award, American Association of Geographers (AAG).
- 2011 - Outstanding Contributions Award in Remote Sensing, American Association of Geographers (AAG).
- 2008 - Senior Fellowship Award, National Aeronautics and Space Administration.

== Selected works ==
=== Journal articles ===
- Weng, Q. 2001. A remote sensing-GIS evaluation of urban expansion and its impact on surface temperature in the Zhujiang Delta, China. International Journal of Remote Sensing, 22(10), 1999–2014. DOI: https://doi.org/10.1080/713860788
- Weng, Q.*, Lu, D. and J. Schubring. 2004. Estimation of land surface temperature-vegetation abundance relationship for urban heat island studies. Remote Sensing of Environment, 89(4), 467–483. DOI: https://doi.org/10.1016/j.rse.2003.11.005
- Weng, Q.* and Lu, D. 2008. A sub-pixel analysis of urbanization effect on land surface temperature and its interplay with impervious surface and vegetation coverage in Indianapolis, United States. International Journal of Applied Earth Observation and Geoinformation, 10(1): 68–83. DOI: https://doi.org/10.1016/j.jag.2007.05.002
- Weng, Q. 2009. Thermal infrared remote sensing for urban climate and environmental studies: methods, applications, and trends. ISPRS Journal of Photogrammetry and Remote Sensing, 64(4), 335–344. DOI: https://doi.org/10.1016/j.isprsjprs.2009.03.007
- Myint, S.W., Gober, P., Brazel, A., Grossman-Clarke, S. and Q. Weng. 2011. Per-pixel versus object-based classification of urban land cover extraction using high spatial resolution imagery, Remote Sensing of Environment, 115(5), 1145–1161. DOI: https://doi.org/10.1016/j.rse.2010.12.017
- Weng, Q. 2012. Remote sensing of impervious surfaces in the urban areas: requirements, methods, and trends. Remote Sensing of Environment, 117(2), 34–49. DOI: https://doi.org/10.1016/j.rse.2011.02.030
- Weng, Q.*, Fu, P. and F. Gao. 2014. Generating daily land surface temperature at Landsat resolution by fusing Landsat and MODIS data. Remote Sensing of Environment, 145, 55–67. DOI: https://doi.org/10.1016/j.rse.2014.02.003
- Weng, Q.* and P. Fu. 2014. Modeling diurnal land temperature cycles over Los Angeles using downscaled GOES imagery. ISPRS Journal of Photogrammetry and Remote Sensing, 97, 78–88. DOI: https://doi.org/10.1016/j.isprsjprs.2014.08.009
- Weng, Q.*, Li, Z., Cao, Y., Lu, X., Gamba, P., Zhu, X.X., Zhang, F., Qin, R., Yang, M.Y., Ma, P., Huang, W., Yin, T. and G.P. Asner.* 2024. How will AI transform urban observing, sensing, imaging, and mapping? npj Urban Sustainability, 4(1), 50. DOI: https://doi.org/10.1038/s42949-024-00188-3
- Jia, S., Wang, Y., Wong, N.H. and Q. Weng*. 2025. A hybrid framework for assessing outdoor thermal comfort in large-scale urban environments, Landscape and Urban Planning, 256, 105281. DOI: https://doi.org/10.1016/j.landurbplan.2024.105281
- Jia S., Weng, Q.*, Yoo, C. and J.A. Voogt. 2025. Global investigation of pedestrian-level cooling and energy-saving potentials of green and cool roofs in 43 megacities, Energy and Buildings, 337, 115671. DOI: https://doi.org/10.1016/j.enbuild.2025.115671

=== Books ===
- Weng, Q. 2009. Remote Sensing and GIS Integration: Theories, Methods, and Applications. New York: McGraw-Hill Professional, pp. 397. (Its Chinese translation has been published by Science Press, Beijing, in September 2011)
- Weng, Q. 2012. An Introduction to Contemporary Remote Sensing. New York: McGraw-Hill Professional, pp. 320.
- Weng, Q. 2019. Techniques and Methods in Urban Remote Sensing. Hoboken, NJ: Wiley-IEEE Press, pp. 353.
