= Coordinate Metrology Society =

Organization of coordinate metrologists

- Formation: 1984; 41 years ago
- Headquarters: Weatherford, Texas
- Website: cmsc.org

The Coordinate Metrology Society (CMS) (formerly known as the Coordinate Metrology Society Conference (CMSC) is an international professional association comprising individuals and organizations in the field of metrology. Their focus is portable metrology. The society holds an annual conference where users, vendors, researchers, and educators working with metrology technology meet to discuss innovations and issues relevant to the industry.

== Overview ==
The CMS generally works to advance precision measurement and coordinate metrology by supporting education, professional networking, certifications, and career development within those fields. Most of the activities of the CMS center around the use of a various technologies, particularly coordinate measuring machines (CMMs), both portable and stationary, but also metrology software, structured light scanners, photogrammetry and videogrammetry systems, 3D scanning devices, and articulating arms.

=== Certifications ===
The CMS also provides courses and certifications for coordinate metrology professionals, including CMM and 3D scanner operators.

== History ==
The CMS was founded in 1984 at a joint convention of the American Society of Photogrammetry and the American Congress of Surveying and Mapping. A group of 15 speakers at the convention, along with seven metrology hardware manufacturers and other attendees, agreed to convene six months later to discuss issues such as standards for target offset and CMM shank diameter, optimum theodolite network configurations, and how to bring computers into the workforce. The conference is held annually since 1985.

In 2013, the CMS introduced a portable 3D metrology certification program.

In 2018, the CMS launched a digital library for journals and technical papers related to metrology.

In 2019, the CMS received a grant from the National Institute of Standards and Technology to promote the efficiency of precision manufacturing in the United States, in part by creating a technology road map representing the needs of large-scale precision manufacturers.

== Conference ==
The annual CMS conferences span five days. In the run-up to each conference, the CMS issues a call for papers which are then presented at the conference. The best papers are selected for inclusion in the Journal of the CMSC. Conferences include expert guest speakers; U.S. astronaut Bonnie J. Dunbar was a guest speaker at the 2019 conference in Orlando, Florida. Speakers sometimes include representatives from firms such as Boeing, Lockheed Martin, and Rolls Royce. A number of education events are held at the event, such as a CMS quiz show and "Ask the Experts" panel. The conferences also includes networking events, a banquet, and other activities.

=== Selected conference locations ===
- 2017 - Snowbird, Utah
- 2018 - Reno, Nevada
- 2019 - Orlando, Florida
- 2020 - New Orleans, Louisiana
- 2022 - Orland, Florida
- 2024- Charlotte, North Carolina
- 2025 - Reno, Nevada

== Journal ==
The CMS publishes the biannual Journal of the CMSC, which includes selected papers presented at annual conferences. The journal began circulation in 2006 and has covered subjects such as measurement techniques for developing spacecraft antennas, underwater photogrammetric verification of nuclear fuel assemblies, and multiple reflection techniques to measure and model a British cannon recovered from the Battle of Yorktown.

== See also ==
- Metrology
- Dimensional metrology
- Quality control
- National Institute of Standards and Technology
- American Society of Mechanical Engineers
