= Indian Society of Remote Sensing =

- Formation: 1969
- Type: NGO
- Affiliations: International Society for Photogrammetry and Remote Sensing; Asian Association on Remote Sensing
- Website: www.isrs-india.org

The Indian Society of Remote Sensing (ISRS) is an Indian learned society devoted to remote sensing; it was created in 1969 and has more than 5000 members. It is a national member of the International Society for Photogrammetry and Remote Sensing and Asian Association on Remote Sensing. ISRS publishes the Journal of the Indian Society of Remote Sensing.

== See also ==
- American Society for Photogrammetry and Remote Sensing
- International Society for Photogrammetry and Remote Sensing
