= Schweidler =

Schweidler is a German surname. Notable people with the surname include:

- Dick Schweidler (1914–2010), American football player
- Egon Schweidler (1873–1948), Austrian physicist
- Max Schweidler (1885–?), German art restorer
- Walter Schweidler (born 1957), German philosopher

== See also ==
- Schmeidler
