= Getty Conservation Institute =

Private international research institution

- Getty Conservation Institute as seen from the Getty Center Tram in 2008
- Parent institution: J. Paul Getty Trust
- Established: 1985
- Address: 1200 Getty Center Dr, Ste 1100, Los Angeles, CA 90049
- Location: Los Angeles, California, United States
- Coordinates: 34°04′39″N 118°28′30″W
- Interactive map of Getty Conservation Institute

The Getty Conservation Institute (GCI) is a program of the J. Paul Getty Trust in Los Angeles, California. It is headquartered at the Getty Center but also has facilities at the Getty Villa, and commenced operation in 1985. The GCI is a private international research institution dedicated to advancing conservation practice through the creation and delivery of knowledge. It "serves the conservation community through scientific research, education and training, model field projects, and the dissemination of the results of both its own work and the work of others in the field" and "adheres to the principles that guide the work of the Getty Trust: service, philanthropy, teaching, and access." GCI has activities in both art conservation and architectural conservation.

GCI conducts scientific research related to art, built heritage, and visual culture conservation. The institution offers professional workshops and training courses, and has an active publications program, many of which are free of charge. GCI has supported field projects around the world to preserve cultural heritage.

== Scientific projects ==
GCI scientists study the deterioration of objects and buildings, and how to prevent or stop such deterioration. The institute focuses on materials and projects that are understudied or underfunded. One of many projects in this area involved the effect of outdoor and indoor air pollutants on museum collections. Another project analyzed the cause of deterioration of the sandstone in the original National Capitol Columns now at the United States National Arboretum.

In addition, GCI "conducts scientific research on materials' composition." For example, a project on the conservation of photographs has as one of its objectives the creation of an "Atlas of Analytical Signatures of Photographic Processes" which will provide "a precise chemical fingerprint of all the 150 or so ways pictures have been developed." As a part of that project, Getty scientists once examined the world's first photograph from nature by Nicéphore Niépce. Using X-ray fluorescence spectroscopy, reflectance Fourier transform infrared spectroscopy, and other techniques during the 2002–2003 project, they found (for example) that bitumen of Judea was present in the image.

Scientists at GCI viewed the CheMin instrument aboard the Curiosity rover, currently exploring the Gale crater on Mars, as a potentially valuable means to examine ancient works of art without damaging them. Until recently, only a few instruments were available to determine the composition without cutting out physical samples large enough to potentially damage the artifacts. The CheMin on Curiosity directs a beam of X-rays at particles as small as 400 μm and reads the radiation scattered back to determine the composition of an object in minutes. Engineers created a smaller, portable version, named the X-Duetto. Fitting into a few briefcase-sized boxes, it can examine objects on site, while preserving their physical integrity. It is now being used by Getty scientists to analyze a large collection of museum antiques and the Roman ruins of Herculaneum, Italy.

Through the Managing Collection Environments Initiative. The GCI has conducted extensive research on the environmental conditions that affect the preservation of cultural heritage objects. This includes studying climate-controlled systems, monitoring pollutant levels, and developing guidelines for sustainable environmental management in museums, libraries, and archives.

The GCI has carried out scientific research to identify and analyze the materials used in artworks and cultural heritage objects, through research on the characterization of materials. This includes the development and application of non-invasive and micro-analytical techniques such as infrared reflectography, ultraviolet light (UV), CT scanners, imaging spectroscopy, and mass spectrometers, FTIR and Raman spectroscopy (used to identify the red pigment on an Egyptian Mummy, Herakleides) to understand the composition, deterioration, and authenticity of objects.

As part of the Modern and Contemporary Art Research Initiative, the GCI has conducted research on the preservation of outdoor sculptures, which are exposed to varying types of environmental degradation and face unpredictable decay. Projects have focused on the development of protective coatings, cleaning methods, and maintenance strategies to mitigate the effects of weathering and pollution on sculptures. Other projects within this initiative include modern paints and the preservation of plastics.

Through analysis of paints, the GCI uncovered Jackson Pollock's early techniques through conservation of "Mural", an early work in the school of Abstract Expressionism. The large painting is part of the collection of the University of Iowa Museum of Art, which was donated in 1951 by the piece's commissioner Peggy Guggenheim. While many previously believed that the work was created all in one night, scientists at the GCI discovered that each layer of paint would have needed many days of drying time in between to maintain their structure. After the identification of more than 25 paints, including nontraditional ones like house paint, and techniques used for paint application, the varnish was removed and adjustments to the sagging canvas was made by creating a custom stretcher to minimize drooping.

GCI was contacted by the University of Arizona because of scientist's experience and research in modern paints, including Susan F. Lake's 2010 handbook, "Willem de Kooning: The Artist's Materials". This led to the conservation of the University's "Woman-Ochre", by Willem de Kooning that had been stolen and then recovered after the passing of a couple who had the piece hanging in their bedroom. The piece was stolen from the University of Arizona Museum of Art in Tucson in 1985. To do so, the thieves cut into the canvas, finding an unexpected second layer which they then had to peel off. The painting was rolled up and then re-backed amateurishly. An amateur restoration was attempted to repair the damage caused by the ripping, rolling, and transportation of the piece which further damaged the piece. Conservators at Getty used their expertise to fill in cracks, remove two layers of varnish, and re-back the canvas to be closer to its original composition.

Through the Earthen Architecture Initiative, the GCI has undertaken projects to develop seismic retrofitting methods which improve the structural performance and safety of earthen buildings while reducing historic fabric loss. Research includes assessing structural vulnerabilities, testing retrofitting techniques and providing guidelines for the seismic protection of historic buildings. The project focuses on case studies and adapts previously developed methods to better fit the materials, equipment, and technical skills available at different sites like the Church of Kuñotambo in Peru where the GCI has been using locally available materials and expertise to minimize loss of historical buildings.

Historic places LA, an online inventory of important Los Angeles sites, is the result of a decade long partnership between Getty and the City of Los Angeles. This inventory includes modernist landmarks and sites of historic, social, and cultural importance. In 2020 the African American Historic Places Los Angeles began aiming to "identify, protect, and celebrate the city's black heritage." Recent efforts include identification of four historic sites to be nominated for historic cultural status. The project will also host paid internships and a series of community programs.

== Education and training ==
Training of interested parties around the world is important for the sustainability of GCI's work. The GCI organizes professional development courses, workshops and seminars on conservation topics designed for conservation professionals and other cultural heritage practitioners. These include international workshops and symposia that bring together experts. Courses cover a wide range of subjects relating to materials, preventative action, site management, and sustainable practices tied to the research and actions learned from projects and initiatives. For example, GCI collaborated with other organizations to create a course "to assist museum personnel in safeguarding their collections from the effects of natural and human-made emergencies." Also, GCI developed a course on the "Fundamentals of the Conservation of Photographs" which is now taught in eastern Europe by the Academy of Fine Arts and Design in Bratislava and the Slovak National Library. Besides courses and workshops, GCI has also been involved with long-term education programs, such as establishing a Master's degree program in Conservation of Cultural Heritage in collaboration with the University of California, Los Angeles.

Conservation Guest Scholars further advance the conservation field by bringing fresh perspectives during a three-to-six-month residency where they pursue their own projects. This opportunity for mid to senior professionals encourages scholars to make use of Getty resources and collections and work with in-house scholars, fellows, and interns of Getty.

The GCI produces a range of online resources and publications that advance conservation practice including technical reports, guidelines, and proceedings that are freely accessible on the Getty website. In addition, AATA Online is a free research database containing literature abstracts related to conservation and preservation of material cultural heritage. AATA offers abstract access to a wide range of resources including scholarly articles, conference proceedings which are organized by material, technique, and discipline.

The RecorDIM project, standing for ‘Recording, Documentation and Information Management’ was undertaken initially in association with the CIPA Heritage Documentation committee. The purpose of the project was to improve heritage professionals' ability to gather, create, manage and interpret documentation information, so that subsequent conservation decisions could be made with better and more accessible documentation information. The project ran through 2003 - 2007 and resulted in a number of publications, the most important of which was the book, Recording, Documentation and Information Management for the Conservation of Heritage Places: Guiding Principles, editor Robin Letellier.

== Field projects ==
GCI's field projects are "selected based on how they fit the institute's goals of raising public awareness, contributing new, broadly applicable information to the field, and supporting cultural heritage" and "must be executed in collaboration with partners… who must be serious about their efforts… so that projects are assured of continuing after the Getty's involvement ceases." Field projects are typically in collaboration with local communities, organizations, and government authorities. Among other completed GCI field projects were efforts to preserve the wall paintings inside Mogao Caves and Yungang Grottoes in China (announced in 1989); to restore prehistoric Rock Paintings of Sierra de San Francisco in Baja California Sur (1994); and to protect ancient buildings and archaeological sites in Iraq following the start of the Iraq War (2004).

The Institute was involved in the conservation of the tomb of Tutankhamun from 2009 to 2019. The GCI's work focused on the evaluation and stabilization of the tombs wall paintings which had unidentified large brown spots. The team used DNA tests and chemical analysis to identify that they were no longer a threat but because they penetrated the pain layer, could not be removed. An air filtration system and an upgrade to the tombs infrastructure with new flooring and railings have also been added to stabilize the paintings' condition without removing visitor access.

The GCI has undertaken field projects related to the conservation of modern built heritage. Launched in March of 2012, the Conserving Modern Architecture Initiative is a program which aims to advance the practice of conserving 20th century-built heritage worldwide. The initiative approaches its goals by researching specific modern era materials and making that research available to the public by holding professional training programs for conservators and architects, workshops and in the future, publishing a series of books and periodicals, all while working on international and local sites to create model field projects. The need for such work comes with time as many post-war structures and modern materials have already started needing major work. Buildings and Sites director Susan Macdonald explains that postwar buildings have a sped-up timeline leading up to their first repair compared to traditional counterparts, needing their first major repair around 60 years after their construction. "By the time we got to the 2000s, these buildings from the '50s and '60s were up for their first major repair," Macdonald states. "Right now a lot of these buildings are at the moment in their life cycle where they need attention and repair. And we're having trouble knowing how to conserve them."

Starting in 2011, the GCI worked with the Eames Foundation to create the Eames House Conservation Management Plan. One of the most influential designs of the 20th century, the Eames House (Case Study House no. 8) was built in 1949 making it due for some conservation. The project included the identification and study of modern materials in the structure and site before any conservation or planning began. After the site was thoroughly reviewed, efforts aimed to remove asbestos, add moisture barriers and set up monitoring systems to address future concerns.

The GCI also paired up with the Salk Institute to address issues with the window wall assemblies made of concrete, glass, and teak wood structure of the Institute. Marine elements created a unique environment and their effect on modern materials made this project a unique conservation challenge and case study. After 3 years of study, restoration on the site, specifically to the windows which had been affected by fungi and insect infestation began. This project reflects the institutions, and initiate (CMAI) engagement in local and international conservation.

The GCI and Getty Foundation collaborated with the International Center for the Study of the Preservation and Restoration of Cultural Property (ICCROM) and the International Committee for the Conservation of Mosaics (ICCM), to lead the MOSAIKON initiative which aims to train conservators in the southeastern Mediterranean region to care for mosaics in their areas.

== Dissemination of information ==
It has been stated that "perhaps the institute's most profound contribution to conservation is the dissemination of information and methods learned in the field." Methods of information dissemination include conferences; lectures; books; and online publications, newsletters, video, and audio.

The following are selected books published by the GCI:

- Ward, Philip R. The nature of conservation: a race against time. Marina del Rey, CA: Getty Conservation Institute, 1986. ISBN 0-941103-00-5
- The conservation of tapestries and embroideries: proceedings of meetings at the Institut royal du patrimoine artistique, Brussels, Belgium, September 21–24, 1987. Los Angeles: Getty Conservation Institute, 1989. ISBN 0-89236-154-9
- Cather, Sharon. The conservation of wall paintings: proceedings of a symposium organized by the Courtauld Institute of Art and the Getty Conservation Institute, London, July 13–16, 1987. Marina del Rey, CA: Getty Conservation Institute, 1991. ISBN 0-89236-162-X
- Beley, Ennis, and Jeffrey Levin. Picture LA: landmarks of a new generation. Marina del Rey, CA: Getty Conservation Institute, 1994. ISBN 0-89236-305-3
- Klein, Kathryn. The unbroken thread: conserving the textile traditions of Oaxaca. Los Angeles: Getty Conservation Institute, 1997. ISBN 0-89236-380-0
- Corzo, Miguel Angel. Mortality immortality?: the legacy of 20th-century art. Los Angeles: Getty Conservation Institute, 1999. ISBN 0-89236-528-5
- Dorge, Valerie, and Sharon L. Jones. Building an emergency plan: a guide for museums and other cultural institutions. Los Angeles: Getty Conservation Institute, 1999. ISBN 0892365293
- Lavédrine, Bertrand, Jean-Paul Gandolfo, and Sibylle Monod. A guide to the preventive conservation of photograph collections. Los Angeles: Getty Conservation Institute, 2003. ISBN 0-89236-701-6
- Schweidler, Max, and Roy L Perkinson. The restoration of engravings, drawings, books, and other works on paper. Los Angeles: Getty Conservation Institute, 2006. ISBN 0-89236-835-7
- Rainer, Leslie and Angelyn Bass Rivera editors. The Conservation of Decorated Surfaces on Earthen Architecture. Los Angeles: Getty Conservation Institute, 2006. ISBN 978-0-89236-850-1
- Caneva, Giulia, Maria Pia Nugari, and Ornella Salvadori. Plant Biology for Cultural Heritage: Biodeterioration and Conservation. Los Angeles: Getty Conservation Institute, 2009. ISBN 978-0-89236-939-3
- Taylor, Joel, Michael C. Henry, Vincent Laudato Beltran, Walt Crimm, Matthew Eckelman, Jane Henderson, Jeremy Linden, Michał Łukomski, Bob Norris, Sarah Nunberg, and Cecilia Winter. Edited by Joel Taylor and Vincent Laudato Beltran. "Managing Collection Environments: Technical Notes and Guidance Guidelines" Los Angeles: Getty Conservation Institute, 2023. ISBN 978-1-95793-907-0
- Marsden, Susan, and Peter Spearritt. "The Twentieth-Century Historic Thematic Framework: A Tool for Assessing Heritage Places. With contributions from Leo Schmidt, Sheridan Burke, Gail Ostergren, Jeff Cody, and Chandler McCoy". Los Angeles: Getty Conservation Institute, 2021. ISBN 978-1-93743-383-3
- Macdonald, Susan, and Ana Paula Arato Gonçalves. "Conservation Principles for Concrete of Cultural Significance. Principles". Los Angeles: Getty Conservation Institute, 2020 ISBN 978-1-93743-379-6
- Beltran, Vincent Laudato, Christel Pesme, Sarah K. Freeman, and Mark Benson. "Microfading Tester: Light Sensitivity Assessment and Role in Lighting Policy. Guidelines". Los Angeles: Getty Conservation Institute, 2021

Here is a selection of courses by GCI:

- ARIS (International Course on Architectural Records, Inventories and Information Systems for Conservation)

International Course on the Conservation of Earthen Architecture

== Senior staff ==
GCI Directors
1985–90	Luis Monreal
1990–98	Miguel Angel Corzo
1998–	Timothy P. Whalen

Since GCI was established, it has had three directors. Besides the director, the GCI senior staff includes:

- Associate Director, Programs: Jeanne Marie Teutonico
- Associate Director, Administration: Kathleen Gaines
- Head of Science: Tom Learner
- Head of Collections: Stavroula Golfmitsou
- Head of Buildings and Sites: Susan Macdonald

In 2022, GCI had a $41 million budget, up from $37 million in 2021.

== Getty conservation activities outside GCI ==
In addition to the work of the GCI, the J. Paul Getty Trust contributes to the conservation field through the J. Paul Getty Museum conservation departments, the conservation collection located in the library at the Getty Research Institute, and conservation grants provided by the Getty Foundation.
