= ISPRS International Journal of Geo-Information =

Academic journal

- Discipline: Cartography, geovisualization, spatial analysis
- Language: English
- Edited by: Wolfgang Kainz

Publication details
- History: 2012–present
- Publisher: MDPI on behalf of the International Society for Photogrammetry and Remote Sensing
- Frequency: Monthly
- Open access: Yes
- License: CC BY 4.0
- Impact factor: 3.4 (2022)

Standard abbreviations
- ISO 4: ISPRS Int. J. Geo-Inf.

Indexing
- ISSN: 2220-9964
- OCLC no.: 781712917

Links
- Journal homepage

The ISPRS International Journal of Geo-Information is a monthly peer-reviewed open-access scientific journal covering geo-information and related topics such as Cartography, geovisualization, and spatial analysis. The journal was established in 2012 and is published by MDPI on behalf of the International Society for Photogrammetry and Remote Sensing (ISPRS). The editor-in-chief is Wolfgang Kainz (University of Vienna).

== Abstracting and indexing ==
According to the Journal Citation Reports, the journal has a 2022 impact factor of 3.4.

== See also ==
- ISPRS Journal of Photogrammetry and Remote Sensing
