= Viswanadham =

Viswanadham is a Telugu surname and given name. Notable people with the surname include:

- N. Viswanadham (born 1943), Indian academic
- Tenneti Viswanadham (1895–1979), Telugu politician
- Vysyaraju Kasi Viswanadham Raju, Indian politician
