= Camera mapping =

Camera Mapping may refer to

- Aerial survey, map production from stereo photographs captured from the air
- Photomapping, production of a map by joining a series of photographs
- Photogrammetry, mapping the geometry of an object using photographs, or stereo photographic pairs
- Videogrammetry, determining three-dimensional geometry of an object using pairs of photographs
