= CIPA Heritage Documentation =

Committee of the International Council on Monuments and Sites

- Abbreviation: CIPA
- Founded: July 1968; 58 years ago
- Established: June 18, 1970; 56 years ago
- Founded at: Saint-Mandé, France
- Type: NGO
- Headquarters: France
- Region served: International
- President: Fulvio Rinaudo
- Affiliations: International Council on Monuments and Sites
- Website: cipaheritagedocumentation.org
- Formerly called: Comité International de Photogrammétrie Architecturale, 'International Committee on Architectural Photogrammetry'

CIPA Heritage Documentationi, previously known as Comité International de Photogrammétrie Architecturale, 'International Committee on Architectural Photogrammetry', is an international scientific committee of the International Council on Monuments and Sites. Founded in 1968, it is one of the oldest. CIPA was established jointly with the International Society for Photogrammetry and Remote Sensing to facilitate the transfer of technology from the measurement sciences into the heritage documentation and recording disciplines. French: International de France, lit. 'French International'

== History ==
Comité International de Photogrammétrie Architecturale, 'International Committee on Architectural Photogrammetry' or CIPA was formed by a resolution at the International Council on Monuments and Sites (ICOMOS) symposium on The Application of Photogrammetry to Historical Monuments, held in Saint-Mandé, France in July 1968. The meeting also endorsed the establishment of a committee in conjunction with the then International Society for Photogrammetry (ISP, now ISPRS).

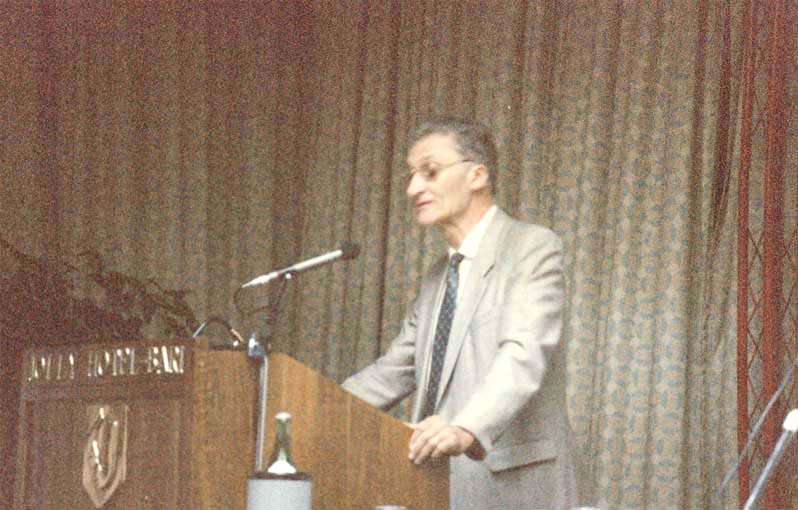
Maurice Carbonnell, first president of CIPA, addressing a meeting in Bari, Italy.

The first meeting of CIPA was held in Paris, France, on 18 and 19 June 1970. The composition of the committee was fixed at eight members, four from ICOMOS and four from the ISP. Maurice Carbonnell of the Institut géographique national was its first president. In addition, the director of the International Centre for the Study of the Preservation and Restoration of Cultural Property (ICCROM) in Rome was included as an ex officio member.

In the early years, the aim of the committee was solely to promote the technique of photogrammetry as a method of recording historic buildings and structures. However, as time went on, it became clear that this was too restrictive and that there was a need for a broader remit for CIPA to encompass the whole of the field of recording and presentation of data for the historic environment. In 2001, at the executive board meeting held in Potsdam after the 17^{th} International Symposium, the committee's broader mission was formally endorsed by renaming the committee CIPA Heritage Documentation. In addition, the statutes of CIPA have been modified; for example, by increasing the committee membership and creating regular members.

In 2019, CIPA celebrated its fiftieth anniversary and marked the occasion the publication of CIPA - Heritage Documentation 50 Years: Looking Backwards.

== Activities ==
CIPA Heritage Documentation endeavours to transfer technology from the measurement and visualisation sciences to the disciplines of cultural heritage recording, conservation and documentation. It acts as a bridge between the producers of heritage documentation and the users of this information. Its mission is to encourage the development of principles and practices for the recording, documentation and information management for all aspects of cultural heritage; and to support and encourage the development of specialised tools and techniques in support of these activities.

CIPA covers a wide range of techniques and areas, far wider than the original aim of photogrammetry applied to recording standing buildings. These are encompassed in three permanent commissions:

1. Application of Recording, Documentation and Information Management for Cultural Heritage
2. Technologies for Cultural Heritage Geometric Documentation
3. Education and Dissemination

Specific examples of areas of interest are analysis of old photographs, archaeological exploration, building and field surveying, close-range photogrammetry, database and information systems, laser scanning, landscape modelling, monument conservation, multimedia and virtual reality displays, petroglyph and pictograph documentation, site documentation, 3D modelling, and underwater recording.

=== Symposium and communication ===
CIPA holds an International Symposium every two years, either in conjunction with a major conference of the two parent organisations or as a special CIPA event. Often, accompanying these symposia are specialist workshops dealing with specific topics. The proceedings of the symposia are published, either as a journal or on CD-ROM; some papers are available online from the organization's website. It also maintains a discussion list, where the experts provide advice and information on problems and solutions.

=== RecorDIM initiative ===
RecorDIM, standing for Recording, Documentation and Information Management, was a major activity of CIPA from 2001 to 2007, ending with the completion of several publications. The programme followed proposals by Robin Letellier, then vice president of CIPA, concerning an initiative he developed in the previous five years, leading to the CIPA outreach workshops.

The outreach workshops took place in Austria in 1996, Sweden in 1997 and Brazil in 1999. The workshops brought CIPA to reflect on its activities, to question its operations, and to work towards restructuring itself with a new framework of activities. In particular, the realisation that simple documentation in itself was not enough – it had to be tailored and brought to the many professionals involved in heritage management. The initiative led to the involvement of François LeBlanc, head of field project at the Getty Conservation Institute (GCI). This resulted in the publication of five documents, the most important being Recording, Documentation and Information Management for the Conservation of Heritage Places: Guiding Principles Vol I and Illustrated Examples Vol II.

== Membership ==
In 2019, statutes were revised to allow for members. The membership categories include the executive committee, within which there is an executive bureau, then regular members, expert members, honorary members, honorary presidents, and sustaining members. Individual membership of CIPA is open to all ICOMOS members and/or individuals belonging to ISPRS. The organization has more than 1,000 members, representing over 100 countries.
