= Journal of the Indian Society of Remote Sensing =

- Discipline: Remote sensing
- Language: English

Publication details
- Publisher: Springer Science+Business Media

Standard abbreviations
- ISO 4: J. Indian Soc. Remote Sens.

Indexing
- ISSN: 0255-660X (print); 0974-3006 (web)

The Journal of the Indian Society of Remote Sensing is an academic journal about remote sensing published by Springer on behalf of the Indian Society of Remote Sensing. Its editor-in-chief is Dr. Shailesh Nayak; editor is Dr. Prakash Chauhan; and executive editor is Dr. George Philip; its 2025 impact factor is 2.1, with its 5-year Journal Impact Factor being 2.4.
