= Tony Clements (director) =

Theatre director and actor (born 1963)

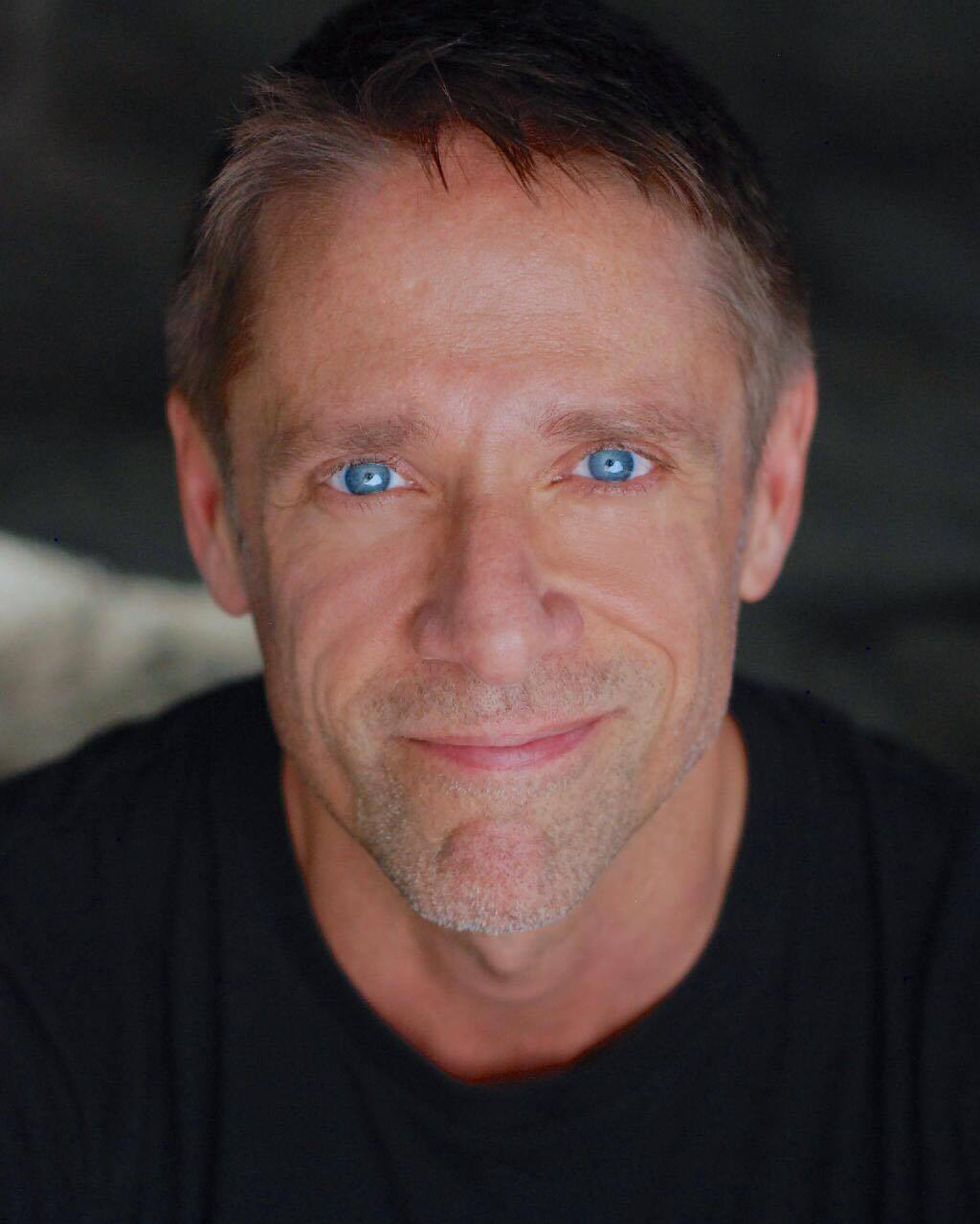
Tony Clements

Tony Clements (born February 19, 1963) is an American theatre director and actor from New York, United States.

He is the New York Creative Director for Harmony Japan, Ltd, and the Assistant Producer of "Disney on Classic," an annual series of symphony concert tours throughout Japan, Taiwan, and South Korea. His theatrical work includes Bill Austin in "Mamma Mia!" on Broadway, Floyd in "Floyd Collins" at the Skylight Opera Theatre in Milwaukee, Wisconsin, and guest vocalist with the Tokyo Philharmonic Orchestra. He has toured the United States and Canada in "Mamma Mia," and has toured Japan with "Disney on Classic."

== Early life ==
Clements was born in Milwaukee, Wisconsin in 1963 and grew up in Waterford, Wisconsin. In 1983, Clements moved to Milwaukee to pursue a career in theatre, which was preceded by work in the advertising department at a local newspaper, jobs selling pianos and keyboards, and doing market research for DCI Marketing.

== Theatrical career ==
Early beginnings in community and dinner theatre in the Midwest led to frequent performances with The Skylight Opera Theatre, The Milwaukee Chamber Theatre, The Milwaukee Repertory Theatre, The Madison Repertory Theatre, Madison Opera, and First Stage Milwaukee and others. Most popular roles included Prior Walter in "Angels in America" at the Milwaukee Chamber Theatre, Floyd Collins at The Skylight Opera Theatre, and Whizzer in "Falsettos," also at the Skylight Opera Theatre.

In 2002, he was cast as part of the original company of the "Mamma Mia!" 2nd National Tour. He toured for over four years, he joined the Broadway company of the show as an ensemble member, as understudy for Sam Carmichael, Harry Bright and Bill Austin, as Father Alexandrios, and finally as Bill Austin. He was part of the closing cast on Broadway in September 2015.

== Composing ==
In 1996 Clements was composer and lyricist for two original children's musicals produced by First Stage Milwaukee - "Thumbelina," and "The Little Drummer Boy." His scores for the Milwaukee Chamber Theatre included "The School for Scandal," and he also spent nine years as a composer for the musical project "Kidswrites," using the creative writing of young people as lyrics in a theatrical piece performed by adults.

== Directing ==
As a theatrical director, Clements has helmed productions in New York, Japan, Tokyo, Seoul, and regionally throughout the U.S. Most recently he directed "A Christmas Carol" for Titan Theatre Company in Queens, New York, "Fun Home" for Southern Utah University in Cedar City, Utah, and "How I Became A Pirate" for Children's Theatre of Madison. Prior to that was "Next To Normal" for Idaho State University at the Stephens Performing Arts Center in Pocatello, Idaho. Past directing projects include "Sunday in the Park with George," "Urinetown," "Seussical" and more.

In 2007 he joined the company of "Disney on Classic," a symphony concert tour of Japan featuring the 60-piece Orchestra Japan and eight U.S. singers. In 2009 he became the Resident Stage Director for "Disney on Classic," as well as the U.S. Casting Director. In 2017 Clements joined the staff of Harmony Japan, Ltd. as the New York Creative Director, and was named Assistant Producer of "Disney On Classic." The company produces two full symphony concert tours, a two-month Japan / Asia tour and a four-month Japan tour. The fall tour plays to over 100,000 each year.

== Personal life ==
Clements has been in a relationship with actor Rob Hancock since 2000.
