= Asian Association on Remote Sensing =

Non-governmental organisation

- Formation: 1981
- Type: NGO
- Legal status: Active
- Region served: Asia-Pacific
- Website: acrs-aars.org

Asian Association on Remote Sensing (AARS) is a non-governmental organization established in 1981 to promote remote sensing in the Asia-Pacific region; it currently has members from 29 countries.

== Members ==
Its members include:

- Indian Society of Remote Sensing
- Surveying & Spatial Sciences Institute
- Malaysian Remote Sensing Agency
- Japan Society of Photogrammetry and Remote Sensing
- SPARRSO
- Institute of Remote Sensing and Digital Earth
- Korean Society of Remote Sensing
