= Schmeidler =

Schmeidler is a surname. Notable people with the surname include:

- David Schmeidler (1939–2022), Israeli mathematician and economic theorist
- Rachel Schmeidler, American artist

== See also ==
- 22348 Schmeidler, a main-belt asteroid
- Schweidler
