= Japan Society of Photogrammetry and Remote Sensing =

Japanese learned society

- Formation: 1962
- Type: NGO
- Affiliations: International Society for Photogrammetry and Remote Sensing
- Website: www.jsprs.jp

The Japan Society of Photogrammetry and Remote Sensing (JSRS) is a Japanese learned society devoted to photogrammetry and remote sensing. It is a member of the International Society for Photogrammetry and Remote Sensing. ISRS publishes the Journal of the Japan Society of Photogrammetry and Remote Sensing.

== See also ==
- American Society for Photogrammetry and Remote Sensing
- International Society for Photogrammetry and Remote Sensing
