= American Congress on Surveying and Mapping =

The American Congress on Surveying and Mapping (ACSM) was an American professional association representing the interests of those engaged in measuring and communicating geospatial data.

Originally, it was composed of four organizations:

- American Association for Geodetic Surveying (AAGS)
- National Society of Professional Surveyors (NSPS)
- Cartographic and Geographic Information Society (CaGIS)
- Geographic and Land Information Society (GLIS)

During the 2000s, CaGIS and GLIS removed themselves from ACSM; in 2012, ACSM legally merged into the NSPS, while AAGS remained separate.

It published the bimonthly ACSM Bulletin, no longer in publication. ACSM also published the quarterly Surveying and Land Information Science (SaLIS) technical journal, now officially published by the AAGS.

In 1984, it held a joint convention with American Society for Photogrammetry and Remote Sensing (then American Society for Photogrammetry). At that conference, the Coordinate Metrology Society was founded.

== See also ==
- American Society for Photogrammetry and Remote Sensing
- ALTA Survey
- Canadian Institute of Geomatics
- International Federation of Surveyors
