= Chicago Motorsports Council =

- Type: Non-profit organization
- Genre: Motorcycle club
- Founded: 2006
- Headquarters: Chicago, Illinois

The Chicago Motorsports Council or C.M.S.C. is a Chicago, Illinois-based council comprising motorsports clubs with common interests and hobbies in Illinois, Indiana and Wisconsin. On the website, it claims that the council was formed to achieve "Unity in the Motorcycle Community". They serve a similar function to the Ohio-based American Motorcyclist Association, which is the largest group of its kind in the United States.

== Background ==
Incorporated in November 2006, C.M.S.C. formed with the vision of becoming an organization that helps existing clubs work together and new motorcycle clubs form properly, making them an organization of organizations. All of the member organizations must "have a common love of the sport of Motorcycle Riding." The member clubs are predominantly African American sport bike clubs, but have no defined race restrictions, defining themselves as multi-cultural, and hold no restrictions as to the class of motorcycles preferred by member clubs. C.M.S.C. is a non-profit organization.

In the biker community, a club which gains membership in C.M.S.C. essentially allows its clubs to operate with the recognition of MC's, or Outlaw motorcycle clubs. This recognition is important to a respective club's survival as not being a direct threat to territory under the control of an outlaw club. Instead of generating money for their organizations through criminal activities, they do so by throwing parties and sponsoring community events, which are often charitable. C.M.S.C. is a non-profit organization and they host an annual awards banquet every December, called the Unity Party. They also sponsor a bike blessing each spring and other events through the year.

== Member clubs ==
C.M.S.C. has over 40 chartered clubs in the Chicago area. Some of the larger clubs that make up C.M.S.C. are:

- Nu World Ryders
- Redliners
- 5th Gear
- Wasup Then riders

== Website ==
- https://web.archive.org/web/20130526090953/http://chicagomotorsportscouncil.org/
- http://www.facebook.com/pages/Chicago-Motor-Sports-Council/132269160156934
