= Romer arm =

A ROMER Arm is a term for a portable coordinate measuring machine ROMER, a company Acquired by the Hexagon AB group, and part of the Manufacturing Intelligence division, designed the ROMER arm in the 1980s to solve the problem of how to measure large objects such as airplanes and car bodies without moving them to a dedicated measuring laboratory. A coordinate measuring machine precisely measures an object in a 3D coordinate system, often in comparison to a computer aided design (CAD) model. A portable coordinate measuring machine is usually a manual measuring device, which indicates that it requires a person to operate it.

The arm has 6 or 7 joints and operate in the 3D world - It has 6 degree of freedoms- 3 for rotation and 3 for translation. The physical arrangement of the arm is much like a human arm, with a wrist, forearm, elbow, and so on.

ROMER arms are used for industrial measuring tasks where the part to be measured is too large or inconvenient to be moved. The measuring arm is brought to the part, which is possible because of the light weight of the system (less than 20 pounds).

== History ==
The original design for the ROMER arm is based on US patent 3,944,798, filed in 1974 by Homer Eaton, one of ROMER's founders, while working at Eaton Leonard. At that time, the measuring arm was intended solely for the measurement of bent tube geometry. Later, Eaton teamed up with colleague Romain Granger to create ROMER SARL (France) to create portable measuring arms for general purpose industrial measuring applications.

The word ROMER comes from a combination of the two founders' names: Romain Granger and Homer Eaton.

The ROMER companies today are part of Hexagon Manufacturing Intelligence.

In August 2018 Hexagon Manufacturing Intelligence renamed the product to the Absolute Arm consigning the name ROMER to the history books.
