= Wilmot Mountain =

Ski area in Wisconsin, United States

- Interactive map of Wilmot Mountain
- Location: Wilmot, Wisconsin, U.S.
- Vertical: 190 ft (58 m)
- Top elevation: 960 ft (293 m)
- Base elevation: 770 ft (235 m)
- Skiable area: 120 acres (0.49 km^{2})
- Trails: 23
- Longest run: 2,500 ft (760 m)
- Lift system: 11 chairlifts
- Lift capacity: 12,500 skiers/hr
- Terrain parks: 2
- Snowfall: 48 in (120 cm)
- Snowmaking: Yes
- Night skiing: Yes
- Website: wilmotmountain.com

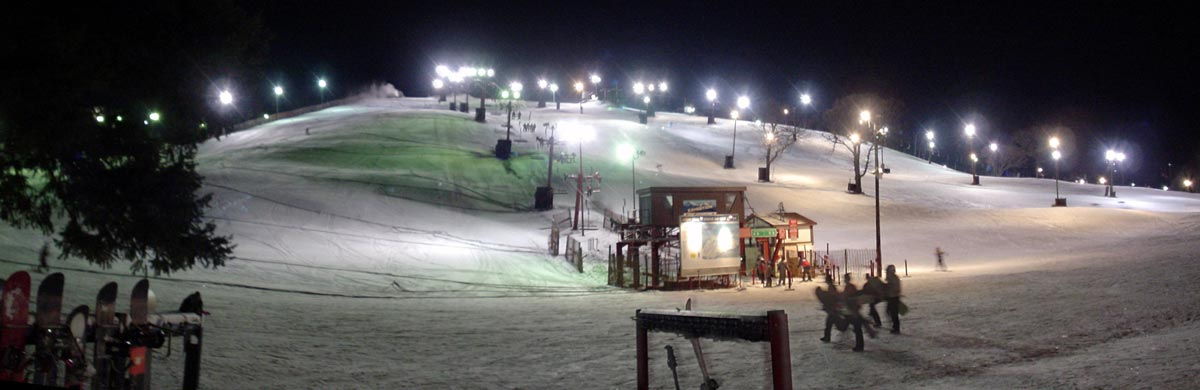
Base of Hill, Evening

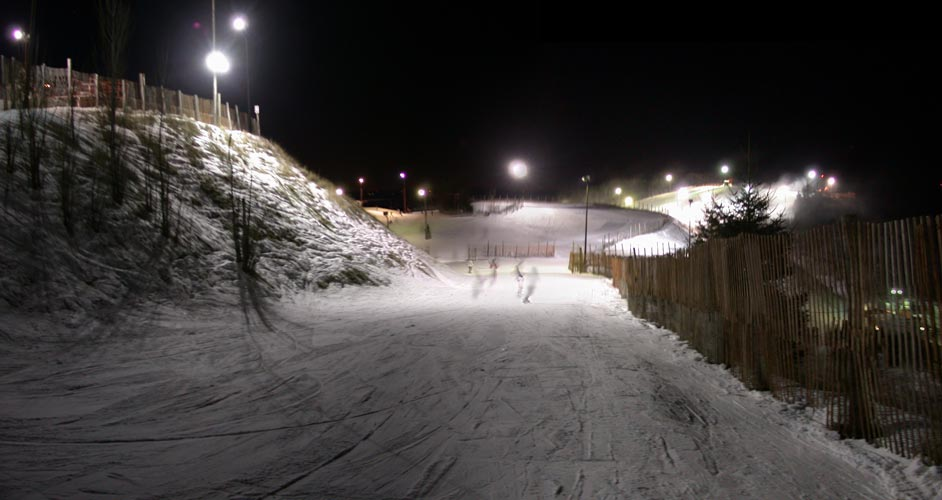
Upper Cat, Evening

Wilmot Mountain is a ski area in Kenosha County, Wisconsin. It is located in the community of Wilmot and lies in both the Town of Randall and the village of Salem Lakes, just north of the Illinois border. Located in the southern region of Wisconsin's Kettle Moraine, Wilmot Mountain is the result of glaciation. The self-proclaimed "Matterhorn of the Midwest" was founded by Walter Stopa in 1938 after a thorough research of the area's topography. It has a vertical drop of about 200 feet (60 m). It is also one of the few hills where the mountain is wide open, with few trees or barriers to crossing the hill. A skier can transverse several runs while skiing downhill. Night skiing is available on the entire hill.

Wilmot Mountain is located 40 miles south-southwest of Milwaukee and 55 miles (90 km) north of Chicago. The Stopa Family were the owners and operators from February 1938 to January 2016. Vail Resorts purchased the resort in early 2016 and completed about $13 million in renovations in the same year.

== Winter sports ==
=== Recreational ===
Wilmot Mountain caters to skiers, snowboarders, and snowtubers.

A new snow tubing facility opened in 2012 with twenty tubing lanes over 1,000 feet (300 m) in length and a covered conveyor lift. A new lodge houses ticket sales, food and beverage options, rental items, conference rooms, and banquet facilities. Wilmot Mountain's Snow Tubing Area was built in a separate area so it does not draw guests away from the existing skiing and snowboarding runs.

The longest ski & snowboard run, "State Line," parallels the Illinois / Wisconsin border—a small section near the top is in Illinois. The terrain park at Wilmot Mountain has a full combination of beginner to advanced boxes, rails and jibbing features.

Wilmot Mountain has a full-service ski and snowboard school with over 300 certified instructors and a comprehensive children's program. It also has an award-winning National Ski Patrol group.

=== Alpine racing ===
Wilmot has an active race program and is the destination of many race clubs and groups. Weekly race training is run in the evenings by their on-site race program. The Chicago Metropolitan Ski Council (CMSC) holds Slalom or Giant Slalom races eight days each season using two newly contoured runs designed with racing in mind. NASTAR races were held weekly until 2004. In 2017, NASTAR racing returned to Wilmot Mountain.

=== Snowmaking ===
Wilmot started making their own snow in 1952 using Joe Tropiano snow machines, basically a lawn watering device with heaters to prevent freezing. Today they use a combination of older and new, high-tech snow-making equipment. Wilmot makes snow whenever the temperature drops low enough, even during hours of operation.

== History ==
- In 1938, Walter Stopa bought the property from a local farmer and founded Wilmot Hills. He started off with a rope tow, which was powered by the drive mechanism from a Model A Ford.
- In 1968, Walter added the first Wilmot chairlift. Walter died on June 10, 1986, and his daughter Diane Reese and son-in-law Michal Reese took over as owner and general manager.
- In 1989, Diane, and Michal added the Iron Kettle dining facility.
- In 2001, Dennis Sheen, Diane's son in-law, took charge as general manager.
- In 2011, Snow Tubing was added to Wilmot Mountain lineup.
- In January 2016, Diane Reese sold Wilmot Mountain to Vail Resorts.
- In March 2016, Taylor Ogilive became the general manager for Wilmot Mountain.
- In summer of 2016, Vail Resorts invested more than $13 million in renovations.

=== Auto racing ===
The roads surrounding the parking lot and resort have a very unusual shape, including a hairpin curve. The design resembles a race track oval, and with good reason - there used to be a race course on the grounds. From 1954 to 1967, the ski resort was home to Wilmot Hills Race Course.

=== Location ===
Wilmot Mountain is located at coordinates 42°30′0″N 88°11′20″W, just 1/2 mile south of Wilmot, Wisconsin.

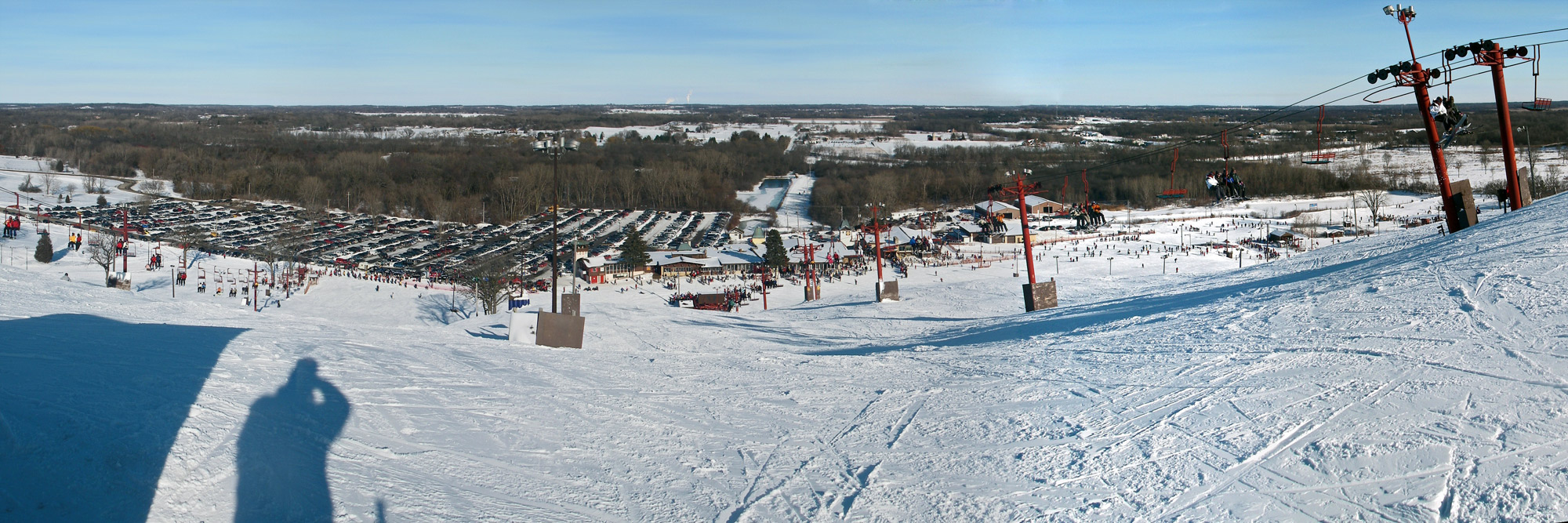
Shot from the top of Superior run, 2-18-07.
