= Max Schweidler =

Max Schweidler practiced as a well-known art restorer in Berlin, alongside his brother Carl, until parting ways as a consequence of a disagreement.

Schweidler formulated and theorized a set of principles linked to restoration in his publication 'Die Instandsetzung von Kupferstichen, Zeichnungen, Buchern usw,' written in 1938. He outlined specific techniques and methods that would make the repairs appear undetectable or invisible. In fact, by the mid-twentieth century curators and conservators often used the term 'Schweidlerized' in reference to repairs discovered on old master prints or drawings that were nearly invisible to even the trained eye.

Following the first edition of this treatise on conservation, a second edition was produced in 1950 and later reached an international audience in 2006, thanks to an English translation and publication by Roy Perkinson on behalf of the Getty Conservation Institute.
