= ISPRS Journal of Photogrammetry and Remote Sensing =

- Discipline: Photogrammetry, Remote sensing
- Language: English
- Edited by: Clement Mallet; Qihao Weng

Publication details
- Former name(s): Internationales Archiv für Photogrammetrie; Photogrammetria
- History: 1908–present
- Publisher: Elsevier
- Frequency: Monthly
- Impact factor: 11.774 (2021)

Standard abbreviations
- ISO 4: ISPRS J. Photogramm. Remote Sens.

Indexing
- ISPRS J. Photogramm. Remote Sens.
- CODEN: IRSEE9
- ISSN: 0924-2716 (print); 1872-8235 (web)
- LCCN: 90656049
- OCLC no.: 23098894
- Photogrammetria
- ISSN: 0031-8663
- OCLC no.: 162324628
- Int. Arch. Photogramm.
- LCCN: 22020600

Links
- Journal homepage

The ISPRS Journal of Photogrammetry and Remote Sensing is the official journal of International Society for Photogrammetry and Remote Sensing (ISPRS), publishes scientific and technical articles and reviews in photogrammetry, remote sensing, and related fields. It is published by Elsevier and is edited by Clément Mallet (French National Institute of Geographic and Forestry Information, IGN) and Qihao Weng (Department of Land Surveying and Geo-Informatics, Hong Kong Polytechnic University). The journal was originally established as Internationales Archiv für Photogrammetrie in 1908, changing its name to Photogrammetria in 1938, and taking its current name in 1989.

== Abstracting and indexing ==
The journal is abstracted and indexed in the following bibliographic databases:

- Academic Search Premier
- Aerospace Database
- Aquatic Sciences and Fisheries Abstracts
- CAB Abstracts
- Civil Engineering Abstracts
- Communication Abstracts
- Compendex
- DIALNET
- Environment Index
- GEOBASE
- INSPEC
- Metadex
- PASCAL
- Pollution Abstracts
- Science Citation Index Expanded
- Scopus

According to the Journal Citation Reports, the journal has a 2021 impact factor of 11.774, ranking it 1st out of 50 journals in the category Geography, Physical.
