= Herakleides (mummy) =

Romano-Egyptian portrait mummy

Mummy of Herakleides
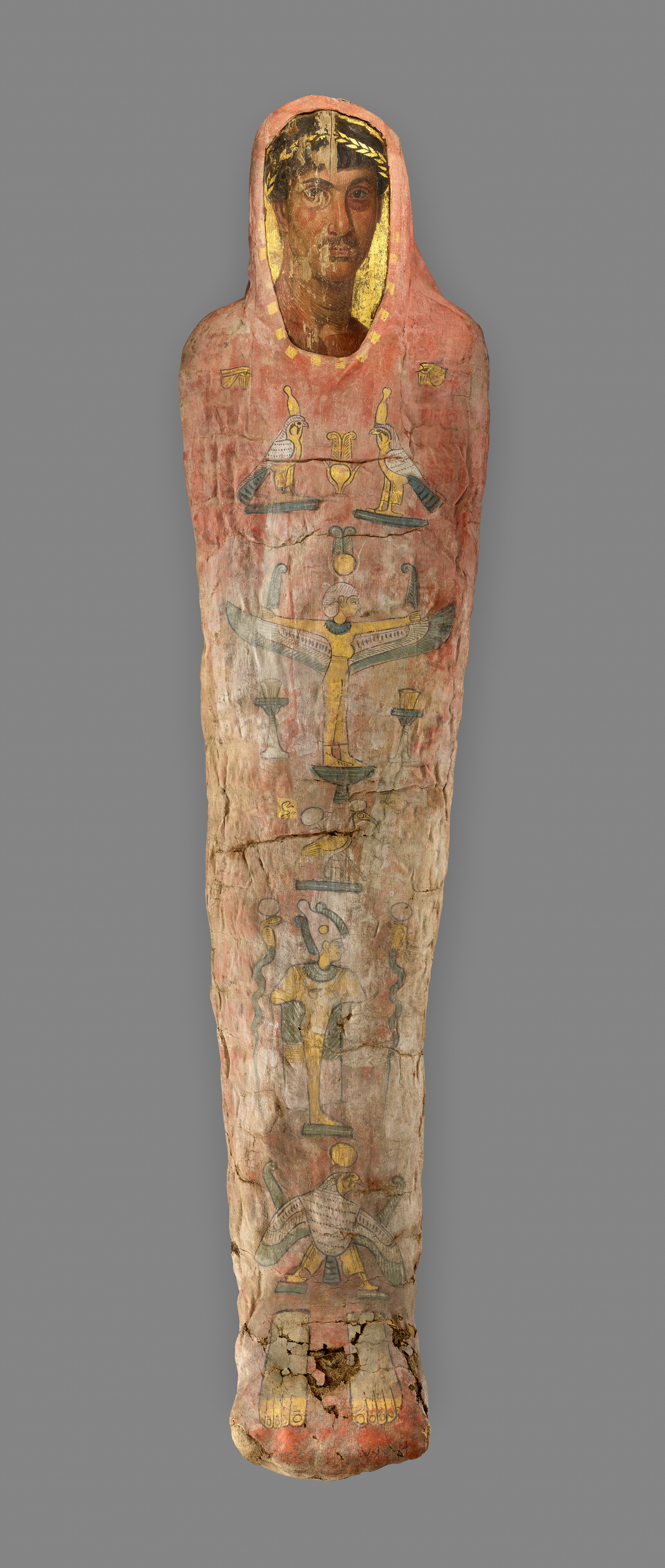
- Height: 179.8 cm
- Width: 45 cm
- Depth: 32.5 cm
- Created: 120-140 AD
- Present location: Getty Villa
- Culture: Romano-Egyptian

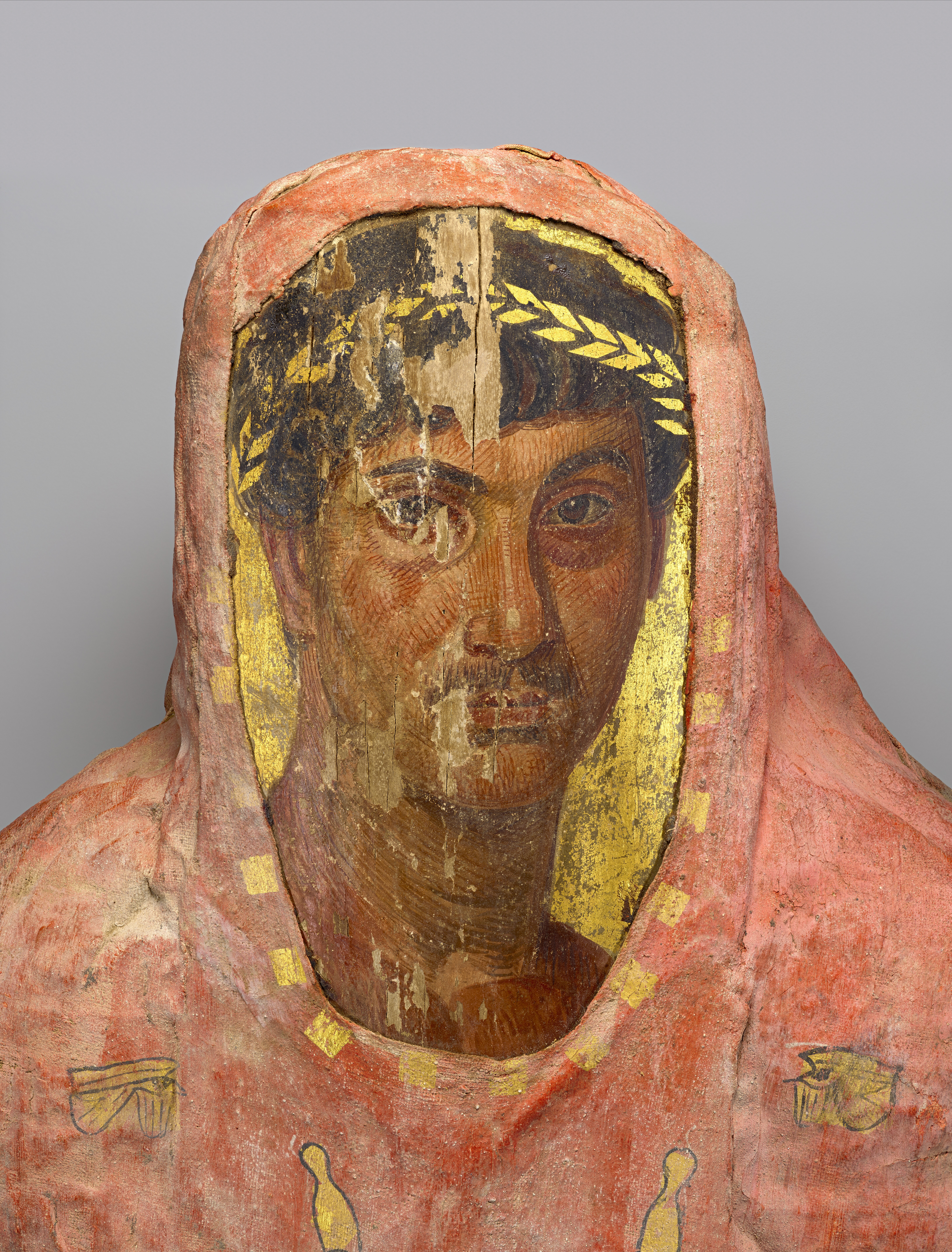
Close-up of portrait

The Mummy of Herakleides is a Romano-Egyptian red-shroud portrait mummy dating to the 2nd century AD. It is a rare example of a mummy portrait found complete with its painted panels. It is currently on display at the Getty Villa.

== Herakleides ==
A study of his bones and teeth determined that Herakleides was about 18-20 years old at the time of his death, which was around 120-140 AD. The quality of his portrait and materials used indicate that he was of high social status.

== Details ==
The shroud of the mummy was painted red and then with a number of motifs, including an ibis at the abdomen. A CAT scan revealed that underneath the painted ibis, a mummified ibis was placed, which is unusual in Egyptian human mummification. This may indicate Herakleides had a connection to the god Thoth, and was a priest or scribe.

Herakleides' name is inscribed in Greek above his feet. Translated, it reads "Herakleides, son of Thermos."
