= N. Viswanadham =

Indian computer scientist (born 1943)

- Born: 9 November 1943 (age 82); India
- Education: Andhra University; Indian Institute of Science
- Awards: S. K. Mitra Memorial Award from INAE
- Scientific career
- Fields: Manufacturing; Logistics; Global supply chain networks
- Workplaces: Indian Institute of Science; National University of Singapore; Indian School of Business
- Doctoral advisor: B. L. Deekshatulu

Nukala Viswanadham (born 9 November 1943 in India), an Indian academic, is currently an INSA Senior Scientist at the Department of Computer Science and Automation, Indian Institute of Science. He is a Fellow of the Third World Academy of Sciences. He is an elected Fellow of Indian National Science Academy, Indian Academy of Sciences, Indian National Academy of Engineering, and IEEE. He was a recipient of the S.K. Mitra Memorial Award of INAE. He worked at the Indian Institute of Science as a Professor, at the National University of Singapore, and Indian School of Business.

== Education ==
- Bachelor of Engineering, Indian Institute of Science
- Master in Engineering, Indian Institute of Science
- PhD, Indian Institute of Science

== Professional ==
Viswanadham is the Chief Editor of Sadhana, Academy Proceedings in Engineering Sciences. He was the Editor-in-Chief of IEEE Transactions on Automation Science and Engineering during 2008-2012.

== Awards, honors, and fellowships ==
- Fellow IEEE
- Fellow of The Third World Academy of Sciences, Italy
- Fellow of the Indian National Science Academy
- Fellow of the Indian Academy of Sciences
- Fellow of the Indian National Academy of Engineering
- S.K.Mitra Memorial Award of Indian National Academy of Engineering

== Books ==
- N.Viswanadham, V.V.S. Sarma and M.G. Singh, "Reliability of Computer and Control Systems", North-Holland Systems and Control series, Amsterdam, Vol.8, 446 pages, 1987.
- N. Viswanadham and Y. Narahari, "Performance Modelling of Automated Manufacturing Systems", Prentice Hall, USA, 592 pages, 1992.
- N. Viswanadham, "Analysis of Manufacturing Enterprises: An approach to leverage the value delivery processes to competitive advantage", Kluwer Academic Publishers, 312 pages, 1999.
- N. Viswanadham and S. Kameshwaran, "Ecosystem Aware Global Supply Chain Management", World Scientific Publishing, 2013.
- N. Viswanadham,"Recent Advances in Modelling and Control of Stochastic Systems", Indian Academy of Sciences, 1991, p. 169.
