= Institute for Development and Research in Banking Technology =

Indian engineering training institution

- Abbreviation: IDRBT
- Established: 1996
- Type: Banking Technology Research Institute
- Headquarters: Castle Hills, Road No. 1, Masab Tank, Hyderabad, Telangana-500057, India.
- Location: Hyderabad, Telangana, India
- Director: Dr. Deepak Kumar
- Website: www.idrbt.ac.in

The Institute for Development & Research in Banking Technology (IDRBT) is an engineering training institution exclusively focused on banking technology. Established by the Reserve Bank of India (RBI) in 1996, the institution works at the intersection of banking and technology. It is located in Hyderabad, India.

== Research and development ==
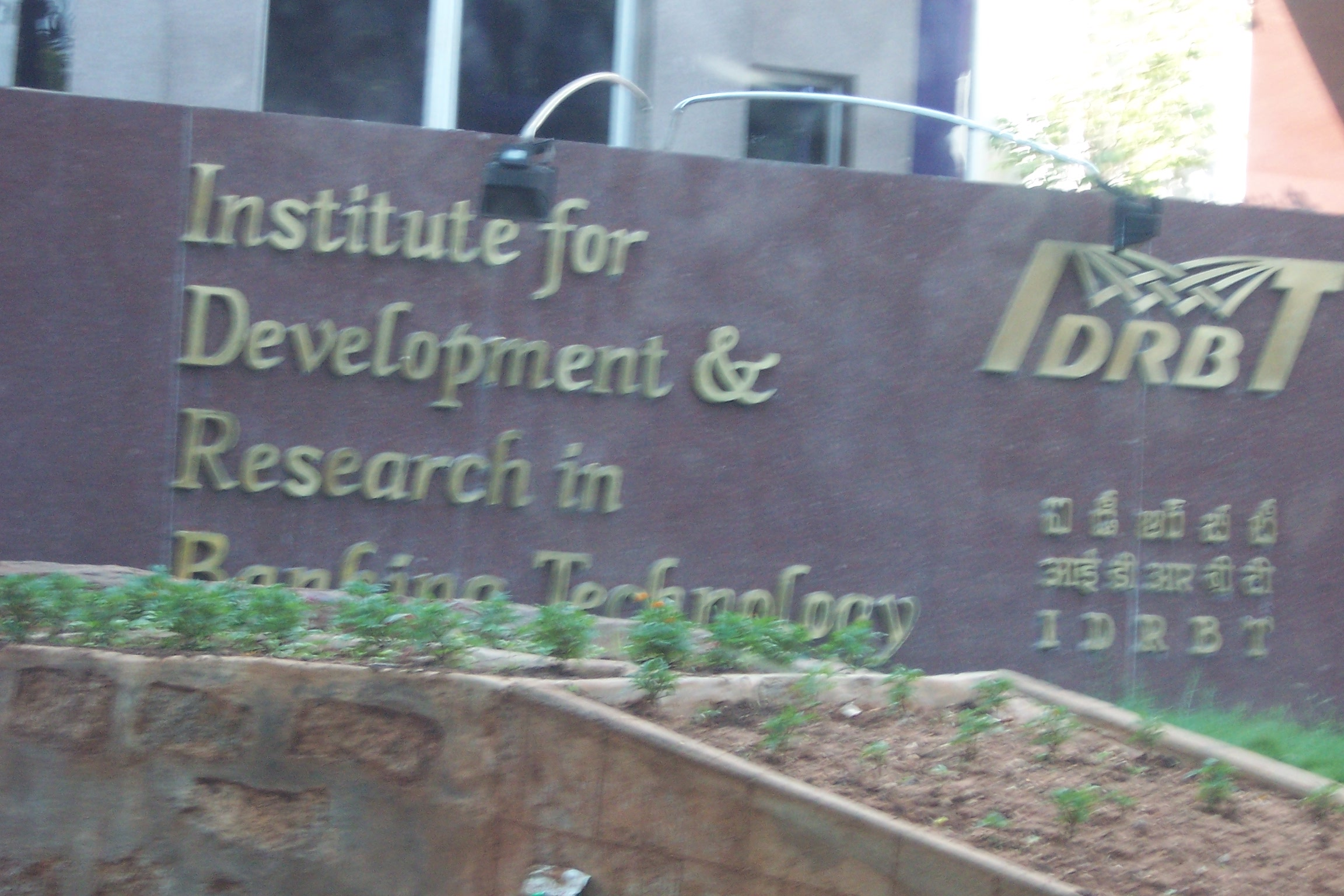
Entrance sign in Hyderabad

The main focus of the institute is to conduct applied research and experimental development in the area of banking technology. The research at the institute is directed primarily towards a specific practical objective that will serve the banking and financial sector.

Accordingly, the research and development activities of the institute aim at improving banking technology in India. While addressing the immediate concerns of the banking sector, the research at the institute also focuses on anticipating the future needs and requirements of the banking sector and developing technologies to address them.

== Main areas of research ==
- Financial networks and applications
- Electronic payments and settlement systems
- Security technologies for the financial sector
- Financial information systems and analytics

== Research centers ==
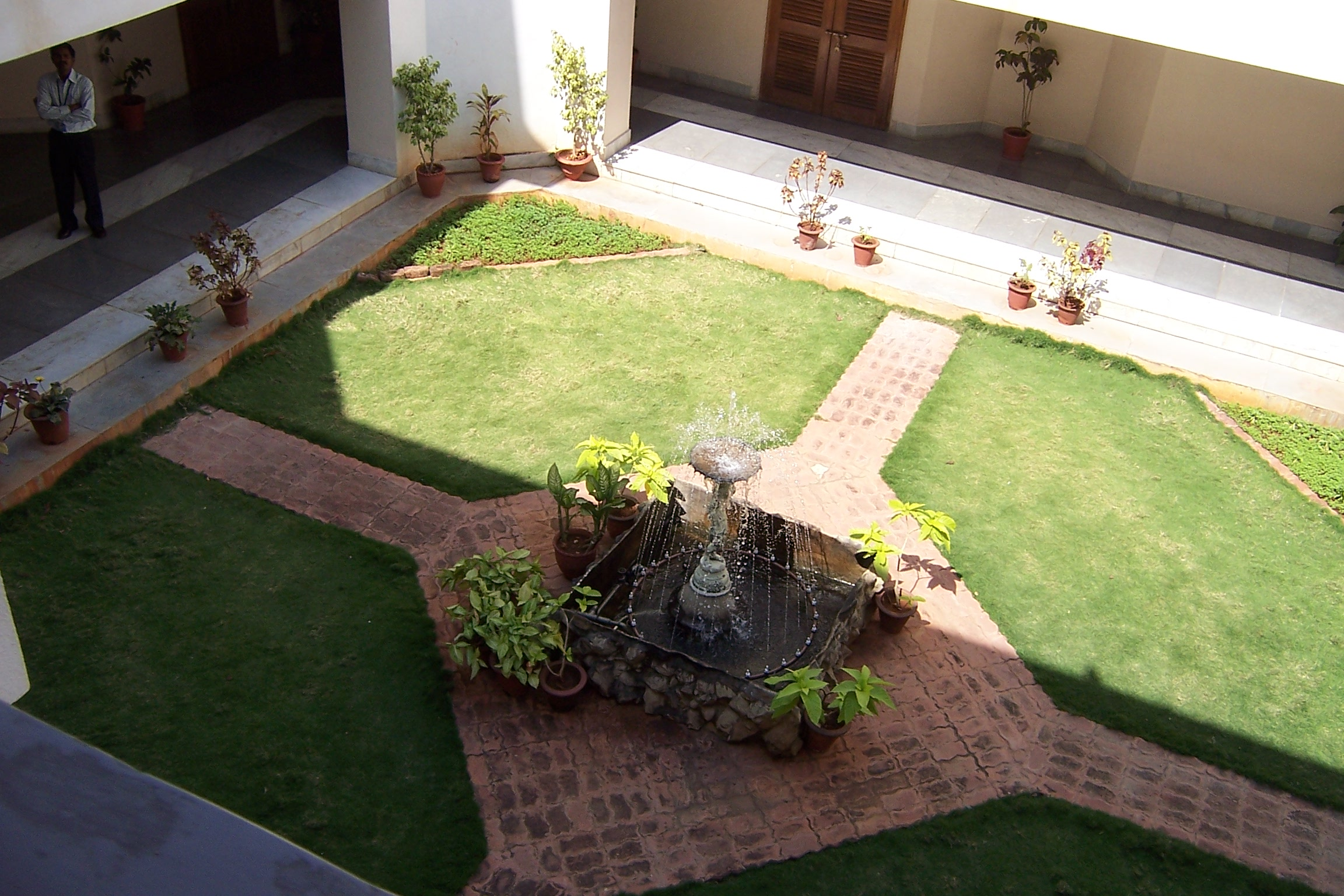
Courtyard at the IDRBT villa in Hyderabad

The Institute has the following six research centers for focused research and development directly relevant to the Indian Banking and Financial Sector.

=== Centre for Artificial Intelligence and Machine Learning ===
- Analytics Lab
- Artificial Intelligence & Machine Learning Lab

=== Centre for Cyber Security & Data Privacy ===
- Cyber Security Lab
- Ethical Hacking Lab
- Digital Privacy Lab

=== Centre for Emerging Networks and Cloud Computing ===
- Networks Lab
- Cloud Computing Lab
- 5G & IoT Lab

=== Centre for Open and Digital Banking ===
- Mobile & Social Media Banking Lab
- Banking Use Case Innovation Lab
- Open Source Lab

=== Centre for Quantum Computing ===
- Quantum Safe Cryptography Lab
- Quantum Communications Lab

=== Centre for Distributed Ledger & Innovation ===
- Distributed Ledger Technologies Lab
- Digital Payments Lab

== Research conferences ==
Every year, the institute organizes an international conference in an area of relevance to the institute. The conferences are intended to promote an exchange of the latest knowledge, experiences, research findings and technical know-how in information technology and its application in the Indian banking and financial sector.

During the last seven years, the institute organized the following three conferences:

- 15th IEEE International Conference on Advanced Network and Telecommunications Systems - ANTS 2021 (13 - 16 December 2021)
- 12th Forum for Information Retrieval Evaluation - FIRE 2020 (16 - 20 December 2020)
- 15th International Conference on Information Systems Security - ICISS (16 - 20 December 2019)
- Fifth IEEE International Conference on Identity, Security and Behavior Analysis - ISBA 2019 (22 - 24 January 2019)
- Fifth International Conference on Mining Intelligence and Knowledge Exploration - MIKE 2017 (13 - 15 December 2017)
- Eighteenth International Conference on Distributed Computing and Networking – ICDCN 2017 (4 – 7 January 2017)
- Fifth International Conference on Fuzzy and Neural Computing 2015 (17 –19 December 2015)
- Tenth International Conference on Information Systems Security – ICISS 2014 (18 – 20 December 2014)

== Academic programs ==
IDRBT offers a range of academic programs, designed specifically to meet both the existing and emerging human resources of the Indian banking and financial sector. These include:

- IDRBT Ph. D. Programme
- Postgraduate Diploma in Banking Technology (PGDBT)
- M. Tech. Programme with the University of Hyderabad
- Certificate Course in Ethical Hacking

== Executive education ==
Training programs form an inherent part of IDRBT's initiatives in aiding technology absorption in the Indian banking and financial sector and keeping it abreast with the developments taking place in technology. The institute's programs are structured to prepare the top and middle-level management of Banks and other Financial Institutions for the future in technology banking.

These executive development and education programs mainly focus on identifying the gaps in the skill requirements and providing training in those areas. The IDRBT provides holistic executive education through these programs, which cover the entire spectrum of technology applied in the banking and financial sectors. The institute offers over 100 programs that train over 2500 bankers every year.

== Banking forums ==
- Indian Banks’ Chief Information Officers (CIO) Forum
- Chief Information Security Officers (CISO) Forum
- Chief Analytics Officers (CAO) Forum
- FinTech Forum

== Contests ==
- IDRBT Banking Technology Excellence Awards
- IDRBT Banking Application Contest
- IDRBT Annual Doctoral Colloquium

== IDRBT Banking Application Contest ==
To bank on the popularity of apps development, and bring in new and useful app innovations in the Indian banking and financial sector, the institute launched the IDRBT Banking Application Contest (IBAC) in 2016. The IDRBT Banking Application Contest (IBAC) aims to serve two key purposes – Indian banking and financial community benefits from the innovative ideas from the best tech talent in the country, and the Gen Next gets an opportunity to showcase their tech talent through this platform.

== IDRBT certifying authority ==
IDRBT is the certifying authority (CA) for the Indian banking and financial sector, licensed by the Controller of Certifying Authorities, Government of India, under IT Act 2000. The CA issues digital certificates aimed to facilitate speedy and cost-effective digital transactions. These certificates are used by the RBI, banks and other financial institutions to exchange electronic messages between banks ensuring authenticity, integrity, non-repudiation and confidentiality. The CA services are aimed at facilitating. So far, more than 2,00,000 digital certificates have been issued by the CA.

== The Indian Financial Technology and Allied Services (IFTAS) ==
With a view to provide focused attention and enable development of techno-banking in the country, the institute has promoted a new Section 8 company named The Indian Financial Technology and Allied Services (IFTAS). Headquartered in Mumbai, the mandate of the IFTAS is to provide IT-related services to the RBI, banks and other financial institutions.

Services like Indian Financial Network (INFINET), Structured Financial Messaging System (SFMS) and the Indian Banking Community Cloud (IBCC) have been handed over to IFTAS with effect from 1 April 2016.
