= Mubarak Shah =

Mubarak Shah may refer to the following people:

- Mubarak Shah (Chagatai Khan), head of the Chagatai Khanate (1252–1260)
- Qutbuddin Mubarak Shah, Khalji dynasty, Delhi Sultanate (d. 1320)
- Fakhruddin Mubarak Shah, Bengal (r. 1338–1349)
- Mubarak Shah (Sayyid dynasty), Delhi Sultanate (r. 1421–1434)
- Mubarak Shah (athlete), Pakistani long-distance runner
