= Videogrammetry =

Measurement technology

Videogrammetry is a measurement technology in which the three-dimensional coordinates of points on an object are determined by measurements made in two or more video images taken from different angles. Images can be obtained from two cameras which simultaneously view the object or from successive images captured by the same camera with a view of the object. Videogrammetry is typically used in manufacturing and construction.

== See also ==
- Motion capture
- Stereophotogrammetry
- Structure from motion
- Photogrammetry
