= International Society for Photogrammetry and Remote Sensing =

International non-governmental organization

- Abbreviation: ISPRS
- Formation: 1910; 116 years ago
- Type: INGO
- Region served: Worldwide
- Official language: English, French, German
- President: Lena Halounová, Czech Republic
- Website: ISPRS Official website

The International Society for Photogrammetry and Remote Sensing (ISPRS) is an international non-governmental organization that enhances international cooperation between the worldwide organizations with interests in the photogrammetry, remote sensing and spatial information sciences. Originally named International Society for Photogrammetry (ISP), it was established in 1910, and is the oldest international umbrella organization in its field, which may be summarized as addressing “information from imagery”.

ISPRS achieves its aims by:

- Advancing knowledge in the areas of interest of ISPRS by encouraging and facilitating research and development, scientific networking and inter-disciplinary activities
- Facilitating education and training with particular emphasis in less-developed countries
- Enhancing public recognition of the contributions of the photogrammetry, remote sensing and spatial information sciences for the benefit of humankind and the sustainability of the environment

The ISPRS' scientific and technical programs are organized by five technical commissions. Each commission is sponsored by an ISPRS member organization for the four-year period between congresses. The five technical commissions have established around 60 working groups which are responsible for particular topics within the commissions’ areas of interest. All technical commissions hold a symposium within their country in 2018. Smaller workshops will be organized by the working groups before the 2020 congress from June 28 - July 4, 2020, in Nice, France, by the French Society for Photogrammetry and Remote Sensing.

== Areas of interest ==
=== Photogrammetry ===
Photogrammetry is used for the derivation of 3D information of points, lines and areas on the terrain from aerial and satellite images for the development of geospatial databases and spatial information systems (SIS). The data can be used in digital, graphical and orthophoto forms as maps, charts and overlays. Photogrammetry is also used for the general measurement and interpretation of objects from images, image sequences, and other non-contact techniques, by providing precise 3D point coordinates and other geometric and semantic object information for populating spatial databases and for creating virtual reality 3D scenes with real-life textured models.

=== Remote Sensing ===
Remotely sensed observations of the Earth from air- and space-borne sensors provide the basis for mapping of human and natural activities; for monitoring change; for assessing and mitigating disasters; for identifying and assessing non-renewable resources; for monitoring temporal changes in weather, land and sea cover; and for many other applications. Spatial and semantic descriptions of objects and features are derived from 3D measurements of imagery, and the interpretation of their spectral and semantic attributes from panchromatic, multispectral and other remotely sensed data.

=== Spatial Information Sciences ===
The description and location of objects and features obtained from images, as well as temporal relationships between physical objects and processes, can be integrated with other data using approaches from spatial information science for analysis, simulation, prediction, visualization purposes. Spatial information science is being applied in urban and infrastructure planning, land and resource management, monitoring the environment, and understanding many other natural and man-made processes and phenomena.

== Activities ==
The principal activities of ISPRS are:

1. Stimulating the formation of national and regional societies of photogrammetry, remote sensing and spatial information sciences.
2. Initiating and coordinating research in photogrammetry, remote sensing and spatial information sciences.
3. Holding international congresses, symposia and workshops at regular intervals.
4. Ensuring worldwide circulation of the records of discussion and the results of research by publication of the International Archives of Photogrammetry, Remote Sensing and Spatial Information Sciences and the peer-reviewed International Annals of Photogrammetry, Remote Sensing and Spatial Information Sciences.
5. Encouraging the publication and exchange of scientific papers and journals dealing with the areas of interest to ISPRS.

== Organization ==
ISPRS is currently a society composed of 92 national, 16 associate, 15 regional and 58 sustaining societies and organizations, led by a council for policy direction and management in accordance with resolutions set forth by its general assembly, which convenes every four years. Organizations may join ISPRS as:

- Ordinary Members: Representing the whole community of photogrammetry, remote sensing and spatial information specialists in the country or region.
- Associate Members: Representing a community that has a strong interest in participating in the society's affairs, and which is not represented by the ordinary member organization of the country.
- Regional Members: A multi-national association established for the purpose of considering issues of common interest, promoting regional cooperation, convening regional conferences etc.
- Sustaining Members: Organizations, institutions, agencies or individuals, involved in society-related commerce or engaged in research and/or education and who contribute financial support for the society's objectives.
- Honorary Members
- ISPRS Fellows

Individuals usually participate in the activities of the society through affiliation of an ISPRS member organization. However, they can also join ISPRS as an individual member. Individuals interested in contributing to the scientific and technologic activities of the society are encouraged to join one of the working groups which operate under the leadership of the eight technical commissions.

=== ISPRS Council 2016-2020 ===
President: Christian Heipke (Germany)
Secretary General: Lena Halounová (Czech Republic)
First Vice President: Chen Jun (China)
Second Vice President: Charles Toth (USA)
Congress Director: Nicolas Paparoditis (France)
Treasurer: Songnian Li (Canada)

=== Technical Commissions 2016-2020 ===
The technical commissions are responsible for, and manage all aspects of, the scientific and technical activities of ISPRS.

Commission I	Sensor Systems	www.commission1.isprs.org
Commission II	Photogrammetry	www.commission2.isprs.org
Commission III	Remote Sensing	www.commission3.isprs.org
Commission IV	Spatial Information Science	www.commission4.isprs.org
Commission V	Education and Outreach	www.commission5.isprs.org

=== TIF - The ISPRS Foundation ===
The ISPRS Foundation (TIF) is intended to improve the ability of ISPRS to satisfy its aims and objectives by administering a broadly-based international program of fundraising to provide grants to qualified individuals and organizations who are pursuing and/or applying knowledge for advancing the sciences and technologies associated with the disciplines embodied by ISPRS. The Foundation raises, invests and grants funds on an unrestricted basis for this purpose. It contributes significantly to the efforts of ISPRS in international cooperation and technology transfer.

== Publications ==
Its official academic journals are:

- ISPRS Journal of Photogrammetry and Remote Sensing (P&RS) is the official peer-reviewed publication of the ISPRS. It is published by Elsevier twelve times per year and contains scientific and technical articles and reviews; its impact factor is 7.319.
- ISPRS Open Journal of Photogrammetry and Remote Sensing, the sister journal of P&RS, also published by Elsevier, four times a year.
- ISPRS International Journal of Geo-Information, an international scientific open access journal on geo-information, also the official peer-reviewed publication of the ISPRS. It is published online by MDPI every three months; its impact factor is 2.239.

Other peer-reviewed publications include:

- ISPRS Annals of the Photogrammetry, Remote Sensing and Spatial Information Sciences contain selected double-blind peer-reviewed scientific contributions of ISPRS congresses, symposia and a number of workshops. The series was newly established in 2012.
- The International Archives of the Photogrammetry, Remote Sensing and Spatial Information Sciences contain the proceedings and the scientific and technical presentations of all ISPRS congresses, symposia and selected workshops.
- ISPRS Book Series includes high quality refereed papers from ISPRS congresses, symposia or workshops to provide information to a wider international audience.

It also has the following publishing venues:

- ISPRS eBulletin is the official bulletin of the society, published and distributed electronically about every two months. It contains such items as current news, membership information, references to the ISPRS annual reports, reports from ISPRS activities, keynote speeches, book, project and technology reviews, and minutes of council and technical commission meetings.
- ISPRS web site (www.isprs.org) contains a large part of the material from the above information sources.

== International links ==
ISPRS is actively involved in the work of the United Nations Committee of Experts on Global Geospatial Information Management (UN-GGIM), the United Nations Committee on the Peaceful Uses of Outer Space (COPUOS), the Group on Earth Observations (GEO), and the International Council for Science (ICSU) and has significant relations with several other international scientific societies.

== See also ==
- American Society for Photogrammetry and Remote Sensing
- Japan Society for Photogrammetry and Remote Sensing
- Remote Sensing and Photogrammetry Society
- CIPA Heritage Documentation
