= American Society for Photogrammetry and Remote Sensing =

Organization

- Abbreviation: ASPRS
- Formation: 1934; 92 years ago
- Type: NGO
- Tax ID no.: 54-1386893
- Purpose: A scientific association
- Headquarters: Baton Rouge, Louisiana, U.S.
- Members: 3000
- Affiliations: International Society for Photogrammetry and Remote Sensing
- Website: www.asprs.org

The American Society for Photogrammetry and Remote Sensing (ASPRS) is an American learned society devoted to photogrammetry and remote sensing. It is the United States' member organization of the International Society for Photogrammetry and Remote Sensing. Founded in 1934 as American Society of Photogrammetry and renamed in 1985, the ASPRS is a scientific association serving over 7,000 professional members around the world. As a professional body with oversight of specialists in the arts of imagery exploitation and photographic cartography. Its official journal is Photogrammetric Engineering & Remote Sensing (PE&RS), known as Photogrammetric Engineering between 1937 and 1975.

== Officers ==
Position	Name
President	Rebecca A. Morton, CP
President-Elect	Anne K. Hillyer, CP, GISP, RPP
Vice President	Dr. Tommy R. Jordan, PhD
Past President	Dr. Charles K. Toth, PhD
Treasurer	Dr. A. Stewart Walker, PhD
Acting Executive Director	Jesse Winch
Managing Director	Karen Schuckman, CP

== Membership ==
ASPRS members-individuals from private industry, the government, and academia are analysts/specialists, educators, engineers, managers/administrators, manufacturers/product developers, operators, technicians, trainees, marketers, and scientists/researchers. Employed in the disciplines of the mapping sciences, members work in the fields of Agriculture/Soils, Archeology, Biology, Cartography, Ecology, Environment, Forestry/Range, Geodesy, Geography, Geology, Hydrology/water Resources, Land Appraisal/Real Estate, Medicine, Transportation, and Urban Planning/Development.

== Divisions ==
ASPRS has six professional divisions. They are the LiDAR Division, Remote Sensing Applications Division, Professional Practice Division, Primary Data Acquisition Division, Photogrammetric Applications Division and the GIS Division. Coming soon will be a UAS (Unmanned Aerial Systems) Division. Each division has two elected officers, the Director and the Assistant Director. Division meetings are held at the ASPRS National conferences are attendance is open to all members.

== ASPRS Accuracy Standards ==
On March 2, 2015 ASPRS released the new Positional Accuracy Standards for Digital Geospatial Data:

"The new ASPRS standards address recent innovations in digital imaging and non-imaging sensors, airborne GPS, inertial measurement units (IMU) and aerial triangulation (AT) technologies. Unlike prior standards, the new standards are independent of scale and contour interval, they address higher levels of accuracies achievable by the latest technologies (e.g. unmanned aerial systems and lidar mobile mapping systems), and they provide enough flexibility to be applicable to future technologies as they are developed. Finally, the new standards provide cross references to older standards, as well as detailed guidance for a wide range of potential applications."

The new standards incorporate the USGS LiDAR Base Specifications v. 1.2 released in November 2014 and are a part of the soon to be released new USACE Manual of Photogrammetry.

== Publications ==
ASPRS publishes the academic journal Photogrammetric Engineering and Remote Sensing (PE&RS).

== See also ==
- American Congress on Surveying and Mapping
- National LIDAR Dataset - USA (an effort co-supported by ASPRS)
- Remote Sensing and Photogrammetry Society
