= List of technology centers =

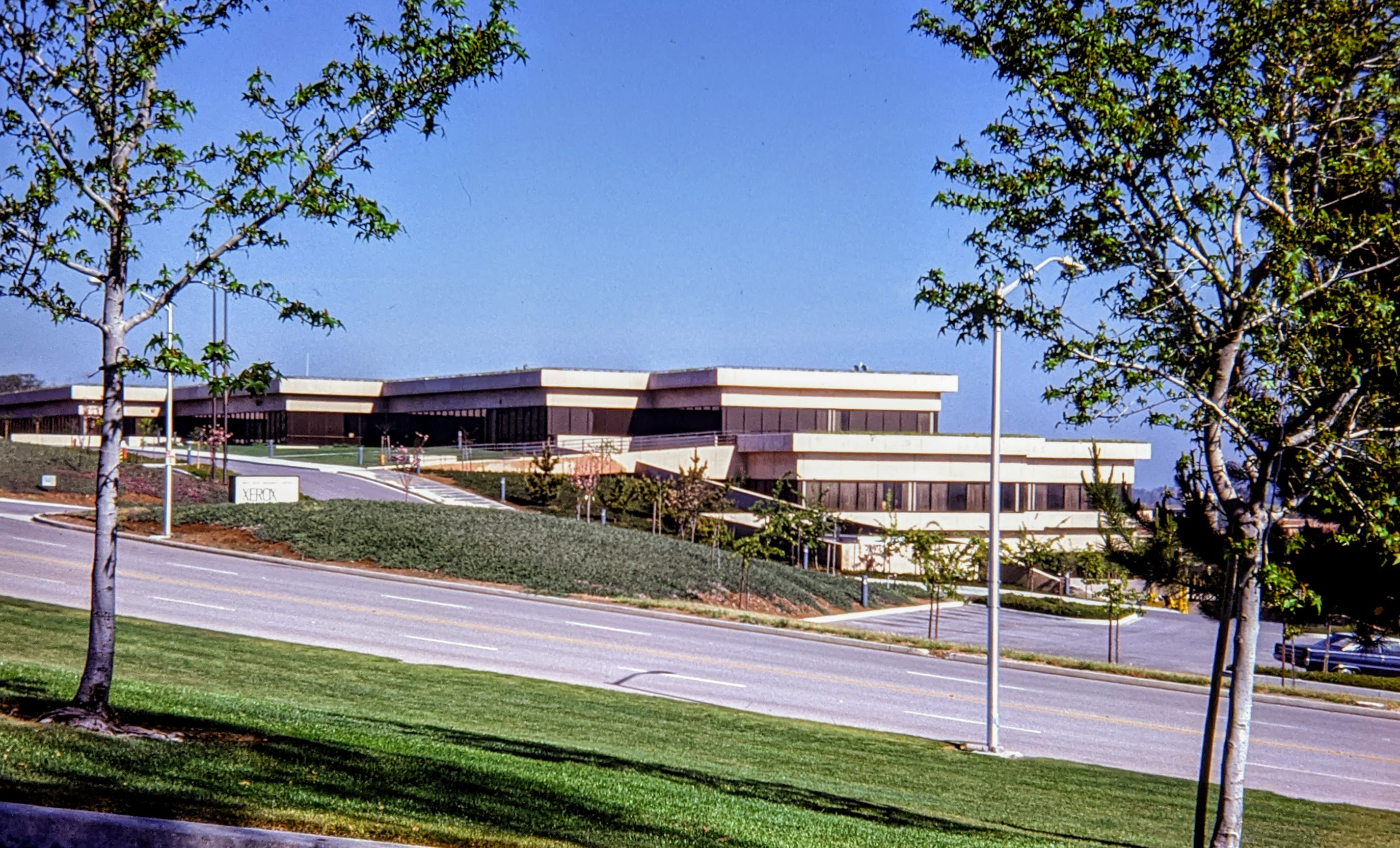
Xerox Parc in 1977, an important technology lab in California's Silicon Valley

This is a list some of technology centers throughout the world. Government planners and business networks often incorporate "silicon" or "valley" into place names to describe their own areas as a result of the success of Silicon Valley in California. Metrics may be applied to measure qualitative differences between these places, including:

- How much and to what extent public and/or private research and development (R&D) funds are spent in the zones
- What percentage of local employment is technology related
- If the zone is mainly government funded or is mainly corporate driven (or is it a mix of both)
- If mainly corporate, how much revenue and profit and which corporations have headquarters there
- If mainly corporate, how much venture capital has been made available to companies in the zone
- What supporting higher educational institutions (e.g., universities or colleges) are located nearby

== Globally prominent clusters ==
- Silicon Valley: Originating in Stanford University (Palo Alto and Menlo Park), and spreading south towards San Jose, California, and suburbs. San Francisco and nearby areas including Berkeley and Oakland are technically not part of Silicon Valley but have seen growth in industries such as web development since the 90s and venture capital. Silicon Valley, home to three of the five primary Big Tech companies—Alphabet (Google), Apple, and Meta—has maintained dominance for decades in core industries such as microprocessor development as well as software and apps development
- Greater Seattle: one of the largest tech clusters in the world and home to the remaining two of the five primary Big Tech firms: Amazon and Microsoft. Companies such as Boeing, Nintendo, and most other major tech players have at least some economic presence in Greater Seattle. The University of Washington and Puget Sound vicinity is also home to a large numbers of notable companies & startups in life sciences, biotechnology, medical, video/online game, aerospace, aviation, fintech, technology investment, funds, venture capital, as well as various research & technology centers
- Cambridge Cluster: The name given to the region around Cambridge, England, which is home to a large cluster of high-tech businesses focusing on software, electronics as ARM and biotechnology, among others AstraZeneca. Many of these businesses have connections with the University of Cambridge, and the area is now one of the most important technology centres in Europe
- IT cluster Rhine-Main-Neckar, Germany: Europe's largest software cluster, is globally dominant in business software, IT security research and biopharmaceuticals
- Shenzhen-Hong Kong Greater Bay Area: Asia's largest technology cluster, is globally dominant in tech manufacturing, consumer software, research, serving global and largest tech consumer market. Home to some of the largest global tech companies, such as Tencent and others
- Geneva, Switzerland is globally dominant in particle physics at CERN and various frontier scientific & technology research
- Greater Shanghai, including Hangzhou and others in Yangtze River Delta, is globally dominant technology cluster with companies such as Alibaba, Apple, Amazon and Tesla global manufacturing
- Dulles Technology Corridor in the Washington, D.C. suburbs of Northern Virginia is globally dominant in telecom, satellite, and defense industries
- Hsinchu Science Park: Greater Hsinchu City and Hsinchu County, Taiwan is the dominant area worldwide for pure-play semiconductor foundry market
- Silicon Alley is a portion of Manhattan, New York City, that encompasses Broadway, the Flatiron District, SoHo, and TriBeCa technology centers
- Silicon Wadi: An area with a high concentration of high-tech industries in the coastal plain in Israel.
- Eindhoven, The Netherlands is a leading area in technology, stems from Eindhoven University of Technology, ASML and Philips.
- Toronto and Waterloo Region is a globally prominent technology corridor with companies such as BlackBerry, Desire2Learn and research centers including the Perimeter Institute for Theoretical Physics and MaRS Discovery District.
- Kista, Stockholm: is one of continental Europe's leading hubs for the technology industry; this influential industry is based in Kista, a suburb in northern Stockholm which is Europe's largest Informations and Technology cluster. Stockholm has the second most unicorns per capita in the world, after Silicon Valley; the city also has one of the highest startup rates in Europe.

== List ==
=== Africa ===
Cameroon

- Silicon Mountain: most innovative startups in Buea

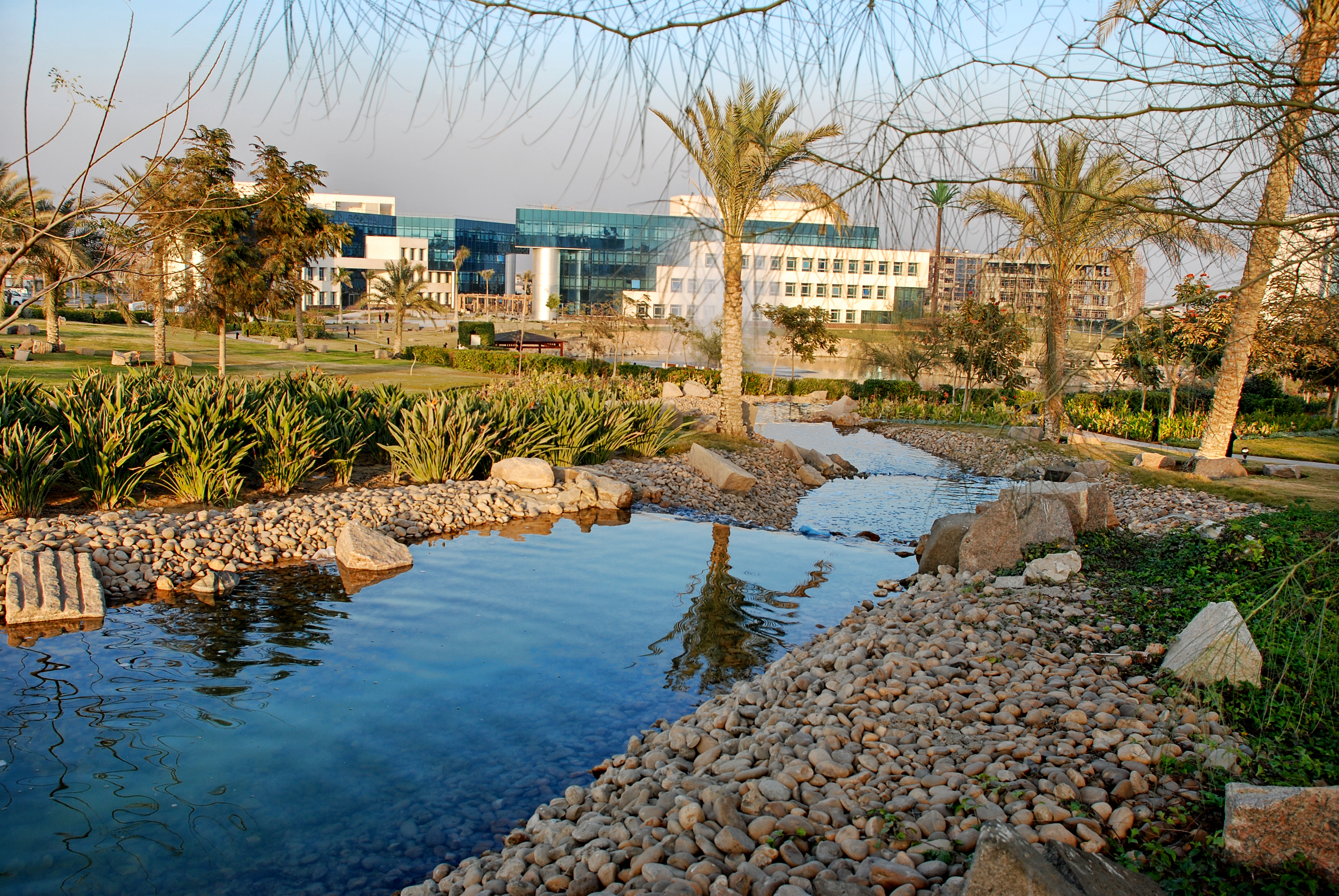
Smart Village Egypt

Ethiopia

- Science and Technology Information Center

Kenya

- Konza Technology City: launched in 2013, and set to host business process outsourcing (BPO) ventures, a science park, and other facilities

Mauritius

- Ebene Cyber City

Morocco

- Casablanca: Casablanca Technopark

Nigeria

- Lagos: Yabacon Valley

South Africa

- Cape Town is widely considered to be Africa's tech hub, and is referred to as the "Startup Capital of Africa". Home to hundreds of tech firms, the city is popular among digital nomads, and is the most economically attractive metro in South Africa for local and foreign investors.
- Silicon Cape, Western Cape
- Technopark Stellenbosch, Stellenbosch

Zambia

- National Technology Business Centre (NTBC): Lusaka
- Eurecat, Baccilon

=== Middle East ===
Egypt

- Smart Village Egypt: part of Greater Cairo
- Maadi Technology Park
- Silicon Waha Technology Parks

Iran

- Pardis Technology Park in Pardis, Iran's Silicon Valley

Israel

- Tel Aviv/Mediterranean Coastal Region: referred to as Silicon Wadi, an area with a high concentration of high-tech industries in the coastal plain in Israel. Israel as a whole country has a strong high-tech sector. The Silicon Wadi area covers much of the country, although especially high concentrations of hi-tech industry can be found in Tel Aviv and its metropolitan area, known as Gush Dan, including small clusters around the cities of Ra'anana, Petah Tikva, Herzliya, Netanya, the academic city of Rehovot and its neighbor Rishon LeZion. In addition, hi-tech clusters can be found in Haifa and Caesarea. Jerusalem also has significant high-tech establishments (Technology Park, Malha, Har Hotzvim and JVP Media Quarter in Talpiot). Another notable high-tech park is the Startup Village in Yokneam Illit. Yehud hosts Hewlett Packard Enterprise's software campus and other IT and high-tech companies.

Palestine

- Rawabi

Qatar

- Qatar Science & Technology Park, Ar Rayyan

Saudi Arabia

- Riyadh Techno Valley, Riyadh
- Dhahran Techno-Valley, Dhahran
- King Abdulaziz City for Science and Technology, Riyadh

United Arab Emirates

- Dubai Internet City, Dubai
- Dubai Silicon Oasis, Dubai
- Dubai Media City, Dubai
- Masdar City, Abu Dhabi

=== Americas ===
Bolivia

- Urubó (Santa Cruz de la Sierra)

Brazil

- Florianópolis
- Campinas, São Paulo, São José dos Campos, São Carlos: The Silicon Valley of Brazil
- Porto Digital: Recife
- Porto Alegre TecnoPuc: Porto Alegre
- BH – São Pedro Valley: Belo Horizonte
- Parque Tecnológico Aberto de Santa Rita do Sapucaí: Santa Rita do Sapucaí
- Parque Científico e Tecnológico da UNICAMP: Campinas
- Feevale Techpark: Porto Alegre
- ORION Parque Tecnológico: Lages
- Parque Tecnológico Botucatu: Botucatu
- Parque Tecnológico UFRJ: Rio de Janeiro
- Parque Tecnológico da Bahia: Salvador
- Parque de Desenvolvimento Tecnológico Universidade Federal do Ceará: Fortaleza
- Sergipe Parque Tecnológico: São Cristóvão
- Fundação Parque Tecnológico da Paraíba: Campina Grande

Canada

- Canada's Technology Triangle with Kitchener-Waterloo, Ontario: home to BlackBerry (formerly Research in Motion), Open Text, Kik Messenger, Desire2Learn, and the Canadian head office of Google; home to the Communitech HUB start-up incubator
- Greater Vancouver, British Columbia: home to Sony Pictures Imageworks, PMC-Sierra, Telus, Hootsuite, EA Canada, Vision Critical, MacDonald, Dettwiler and Associates, Westport Innovations, Slack Technologies, Teradici and D-Wave Systems
- Silicon Valley North: the National Capital Region around Ottawa, Ontario, Bayview Yards,—home to Mitel, Shopify, DragonWave, Alcatel Lucent, and Halogen Software
- Markham, Ontario: home to the Canadian head offices of Sony, Avaya, IBM, Motorola, Toshiba, Lucent, Sun Microsystems, American Express and AMD Graphics Product Group
- Greater Toronto Area: specifically Toronto, Mississauga, Brampton, Markham
- Cité Multimédia, Montreal
- Technoparc Montreal

Chile

- Parque Científico y Tecnológico Laguna Carén, Pudahuel, Santiago
- Parque Científico y Tecnológico Pacyt Bío Bío, Concepción
- Centro Antártico Internacional, Punta Arenas
- Centro Interdisciplinario de Neurociencia de Valparaíso, Valparaíso

Guatemala

- Guatemala City

Mexico

- Guadalajara
- Mexico City
- Monterrey
- Querétaro
- Tijuana
- Cancún

United States

- Automation Alley: Metropolitan Detroit, primarily Oakland County, Michigan
- Cummings Research Park: Huntsville, Alabama
- Denver Tech Center: Denver, Colorado
- Dulles Technology Corridor: Northern Virginia near Washington Dulles Airport
- Greater Seattle
- Greater Reno, Nevada
- I-270 Technology Corridor (also known as "DNA Alley"): Area in central Montgomery County, Maryland, in the northern suburbs of Washington, D.C.
- Illinois Technology and Research Corridor: DuPage County, Illinois
- New Mexico Technology Corridor: Los Alamos to Las Cruces, centered on Albuquerque metropolitan area
- Optics Valley: Tucson, Arizona
- Research Triangle: Raleigh–Durham–Chapel Hill, North Carolina, centered on Research Triangle Park
- Route 128: Eastern Massachusetts
- Silicon Alley: New York City
- Silicon Beach: Playa Vista in West Los Angeles
- Silicon Hills: Austin, Texas and its suburbs
- Silicon Forest: Portland, Oregon
- Silicon Peach: Atlanta
- Silicon Prairie: Metropolitan Dallas (primarily the northern region and its suburbs)
- Silicon Slopes: Salt Lake City, Utah including Utah County (Provo, Utah) and Summit County (Park City, Utah) and surrounding areas.
- Silicon Speedway: Indianapolis, Indiana
- Silicon Valley
- Tech Coast: broadly Southern California, Silicon Beach refers to emergent Santa Monica–LAX tech cluster.
- Tech Valley: The Capital District area of Albany, New York
- Telecom Corridor (an area in the Silicon Prairie): Richardson, suburb of Dallas, Texas
- Texas Medical Center: Houston, Texas
- Research Forest: The Woodlands, Texas

Uruguay

- Zonamerica, Metropolitan Area of Montevideo: The Silicon Valley of Uruguay
- Parque de las Ciencias, Canelones, Canelones, Uruguay
- WTC Montevideo, Buceo, Montevideo
- Aguada Park, Aguada, Montevideo

=== Asia ===
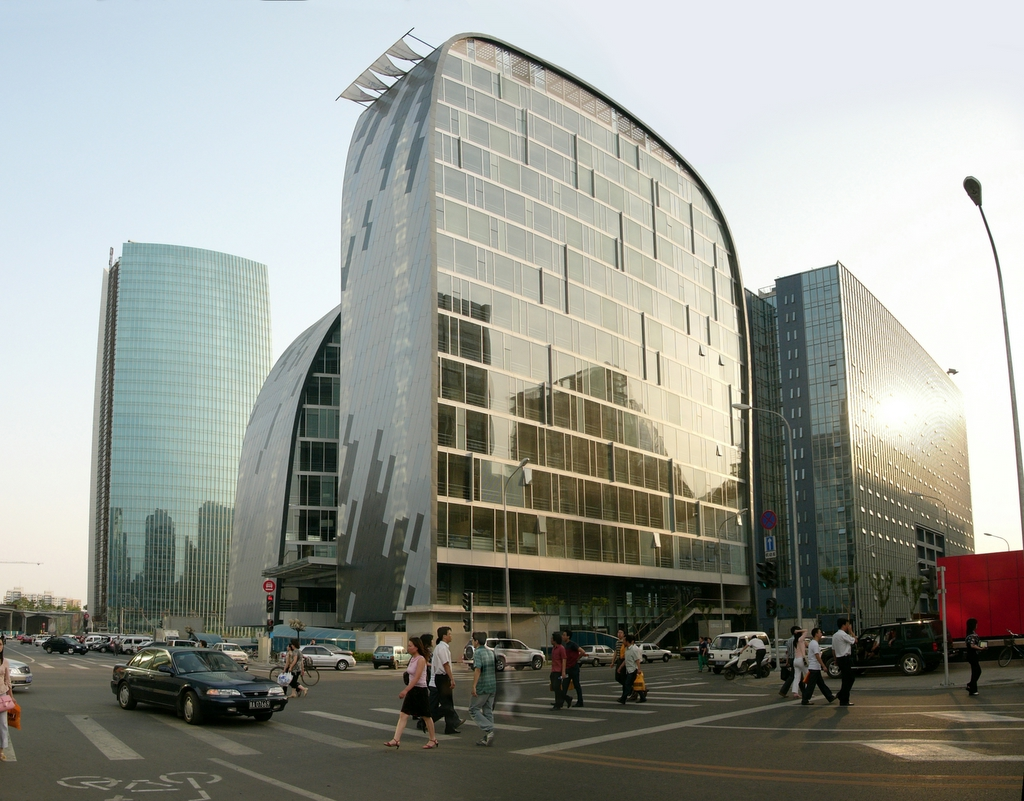
Zhongguancun in Beijing

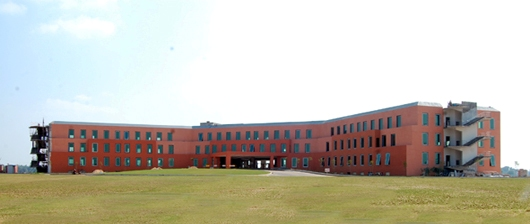
Sri City Business Centre

China

- Jing-Jin-Ji: Beijing-Tianjin-Shijiazhuang Hi-Tech Industrial Belt
  - Zhongguancun, Haidian District, Beijing
- Chengdu, Sichuan: Chengdu Tianfu Software Park
- Dalian, Liaoning: Dalian Hi-tech Zone, Dalian Software Park
- Shenyang: Hunnan New Area
- Shenzhen: Shenzhen Hi-Tech Industrial Park
- Shanghai: Zhangjiang Hi-Tech Park
- Wuhan: Donghu New Technology Development Zone
- Cyberport: Hong Kong Island, Hong Kong
- Hong Kong Science Park: New Territories, Hong Kong

India

- Chennai: DLF Cyber City, Mahindra World City, Ramanujan IT City, SIPCOT IT Park, TIDEL Park, Olympia Tech Park, One Indiabulls Park, International Tech Park, Information Technology Investment Region, Ambattur Industrial Estate, Guindy Industrial Estate, EMS Corridor, SEZ Corridor, Entertainment Corridor, IT Corridor, Automotive Corridor
- Bangalore: Electronic City, International Tech Park, Manyata Embassy Business Park, Bagmane Tech Park, Global Village Tech Park
- Bengaluru: IoT OpenLab
- Thiruvananthapuram: Technopark, Technocity, Thiruvananthapuram
- Kochi: Cyber City, InfoPark, SmartCity, Muthoot Technopolis
- Hyderabad: HITEC City, Genome Valley, Financial District, Gachibowli
- Pune: Cyber City Hinjawadi, Magarpatta
- Kolkata: Salt Lake Electronics Complex, ITC Infotech, Candor Tech Space, Bengal Sillicon Valley, Mani Casdona, TCS Sanchayita Tech Park, TCS GItanjali Park, Infosys campus, DLF IT Park 1, DLF IT park 2, Godrej Waterside, Wipro Sez, TCS DElta Park Cognigant IT park, Technopolis
- Delhi: Delhi IT Park
- Gurgaon: Cyber City
- Noida: DLF IT Park
- Lucknow: IT City
- Navi Mumbai: Dhirubhai Ambani Knowledge City
- Alappuzha: Infopark, Cherthala
- Kozhikode: Cyberpark
- Kollam: Technopark
- Thrissur: InfoPark
- Tirupati: Sri City
- Coimbatore: KCT Tech Park
- Tiruchirappalli: ELCOT IT Park
- Bhubaneswar: DLF Cybercity, Electropreneur Park, Infocity SEZ, Infovalley SEZ, iHub Tech Park, JSS Software Technology Park, O-Hub, Odisha Biotech Park

Indonesia

- Bali
- Bandung
- Batam
- Bekasi
- Cimahi
- Jakarta
- Malang
- Solo
- South Tangerang
- Yogyakarta

Japan

- Kansai Science City (Keihanna Science City), on the borders of Kyoto, Osaka and Nara Prefectures
- Tsukuba Science City, Tsukuba City, Ibaraki Prefecture
- Yokosuka Research Park (YRP), Yokosuka City, Kanagawa Prefecture

Malaysia

- Technology Park Malaysia (TPM), Kuala Lumpur
- Multimedia Super Corridor (MSC) / Cyberjaya, Selangor
- Selangor Science Park, Selangor
- Selangor Science Park 2, Selangor
- Subang Hi-Tech Industrial Park, Selangor
- FRIM-MTDC Technology Centre, Selangor
- UPM-MTDC Technology Centre, Selangor
- UKM-MTDC Technology Centre. Selangor
- UITM-MTDC Technology Centre. Selangor
- Bayan Lepas Free Industrial Zone, George Town, Penang
- Creative Digital District, George Town, Penang
- Penang Cybercity, George Town, Penang
- Batu Kawan Industrial Park, Seberang Perai, Penang
- Penang Science Park, Seberang Perai, Penang
- MSC Cyberport, Johor
- Johor Technology Park, Johor
- Nusajaya Tech Park, Johor
- UTM-MTDC Technology Centre, Technovation Park, Universiti Teknologi Malaysia Johor
- Kulim Hi-Tech Park (KHTP), Kedah

Myanmar

- Yadanabon Cyber City

Pakistan

- National Science and Technology Park (NSTP)
- Arfa Karim Technology Park (former Software Technology Park): Lahore
- IT Media City: Karachi
- National Science Park: Islamabad
- Software Technology Park (1, 2, 3)

Philippines

- Light Industry and Science Park of the Philippines I & II, Laguna
- Light Industry and Science Park of the Philippines III, Batangas
- Light Industry and Science Park of the Philippines III, Batangas
- Light Industry and Science Park of the Philippines IV, Bataan
- Cebu Light Industry Park, Cebu
- Science City of Muñoz, Nueva Ecija
- Calamba Premiere International Park

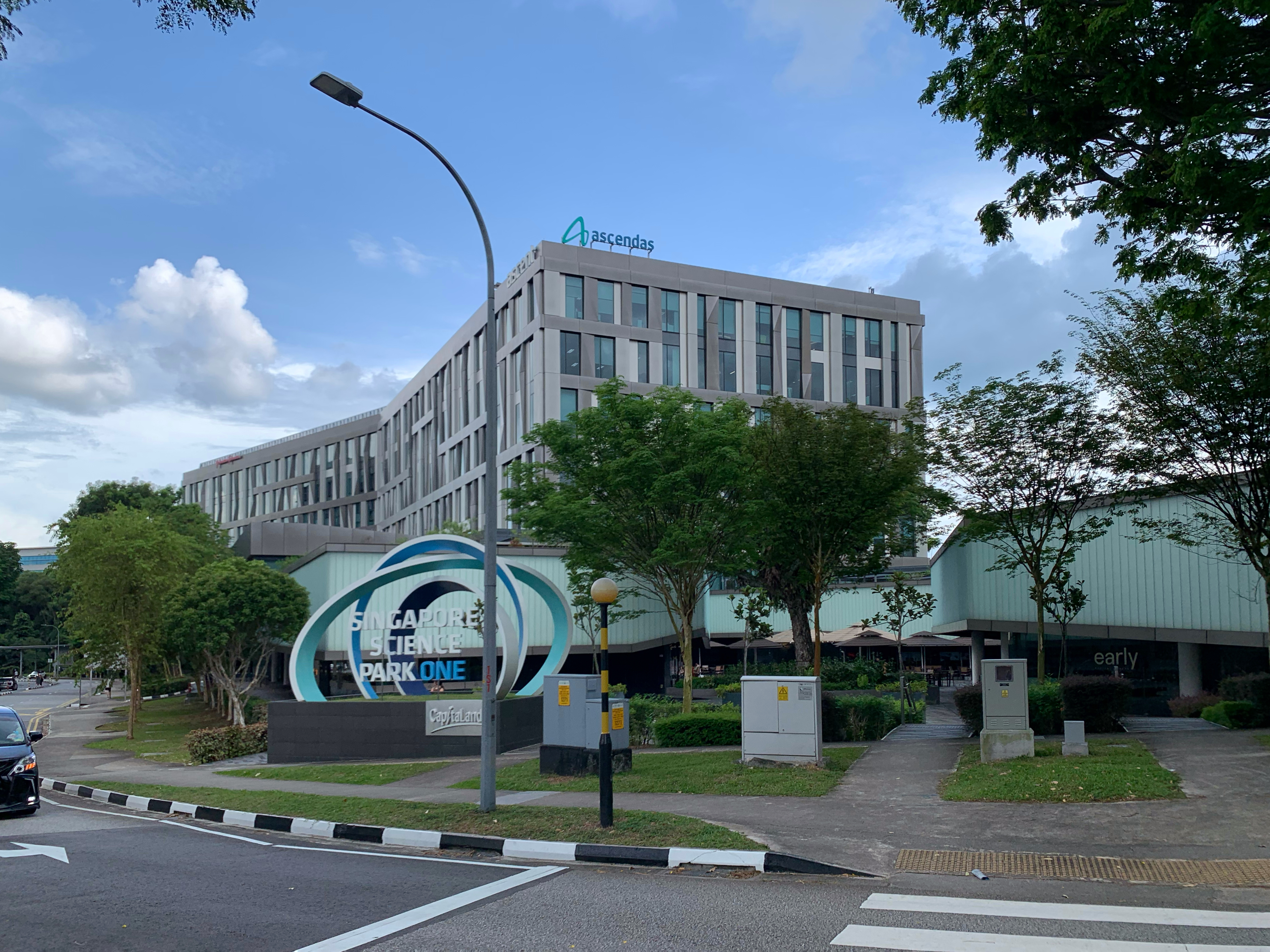
Singapore Science Park

Singapore

- Singapore Science Park: Southwestern Singapore

South Korea

- Cheonan–Asan–Pyeongtaek Bay Valley, South Chungcheong and Gyeonggi
- Daedeok Science Town, Daejeon
- Digital Media City, Seoul
- LG Science Park, Seoul
- Pangyo Techno Valley, Gyeonggi
- Samsung Town, Seoul
- Gumi Technology Industrial Park, Gumi, North Gyeongsang
- Pohang University of Science and Technology, Pohang, North Gyeongsang
- Changwon Industrial Park, South Gyeongsang
- Ulsan technological park, South Gyeongsang
- Songdo, Incheon, Gyeonggi-do
- Teheran Valley, Seoul

Taiwan

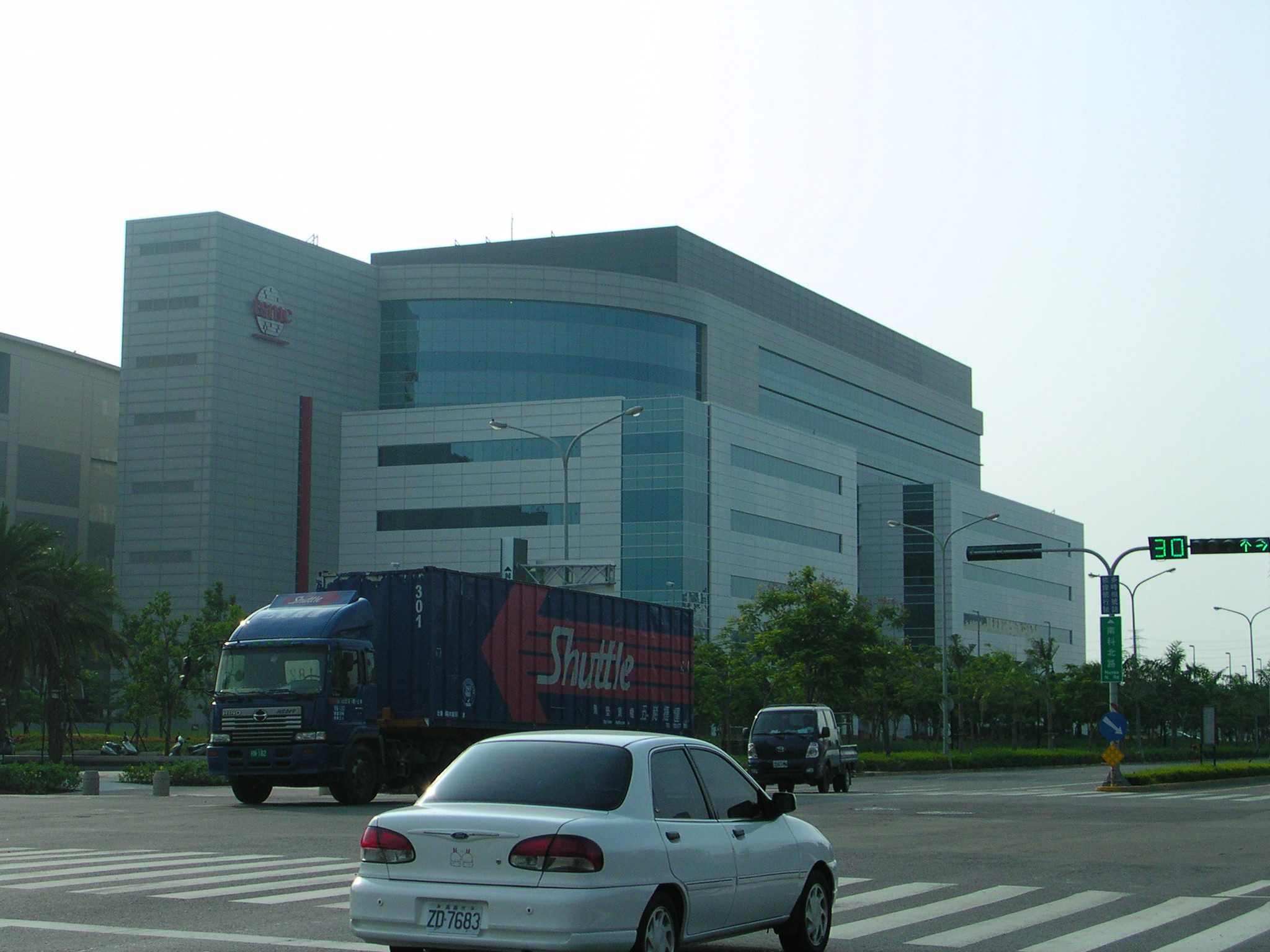
Southern Taiwan Science Park

- Central Taiwan Science Park: Changhua County, Nantou County, Taichung City and Yunlin County
- Southern Taiwan Science Park: Kaohsiung City and Tainan City
- Nankang Software Park: Taipei City
- Neihu High Tech Science Park: Taipei City
- Hsinchu Science Park: Hsinchu City

Thailand

- Thailand Science Park, north of Bangkok
- Software Park Thailand, Bangkok

Uzbekistan

- IT-Park, Tashkent

Vietnam

- Hoa Lac Hi-tech Park, Hanoi
- Saigon Hi-Tech Park
- Quang Trung Software City
- Danang Hi-tech Park

=== Europe ===
Austria

- Softwarepark Hagenberg: Hagenberg, Upper Austria
- VRVis Research Center: Vienna

Belarus

- Belarus High Technologies Park: Minsk

Belgium

- BioWin: The Health Cluster of Wallonia

Bulgaria

- Sofia Tech Park: Sofia

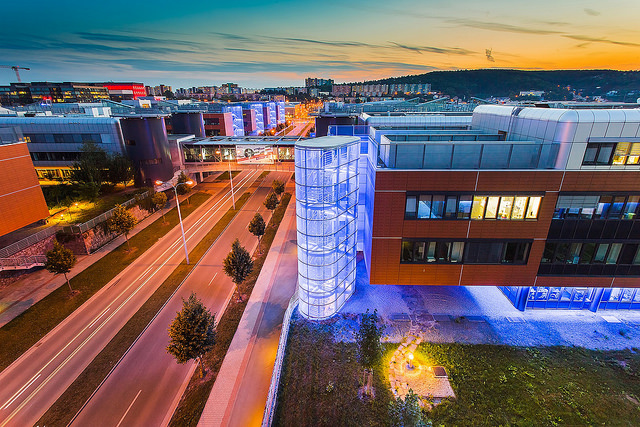
One of the South Moravian Innovation Centre buildings: biotechnology incubator JIC INBIT in university campus in Brno (Czech Republic)

Czech Republic

- South Moravian Innovation Centre (Czech: Jihomoravské inovační centrum, JIC) is a Czech association of legal entities in Brno, Czech Republic that supports companies and connects them with universities and research institutions.
- Vědeckotechnický park (Plzeň)

Finland

- Otaniemi: near Helsinki

France

- Paris-Saclay
- GIANT: Grenoble (electronics, nanotechnology, particle physics, bioscience, robotics and renewable energy)
- Metz Science Park: Metz Technopole
- Toulouse: Toulouse Sud-Est: Agrobiopole, Labège-Innopole, Aerospace Valley
- Valbonne: Sophia Antipolis
- Villeneuve-d'Ascq: Technopôle Lille Métropole
- Rennes: Atalante

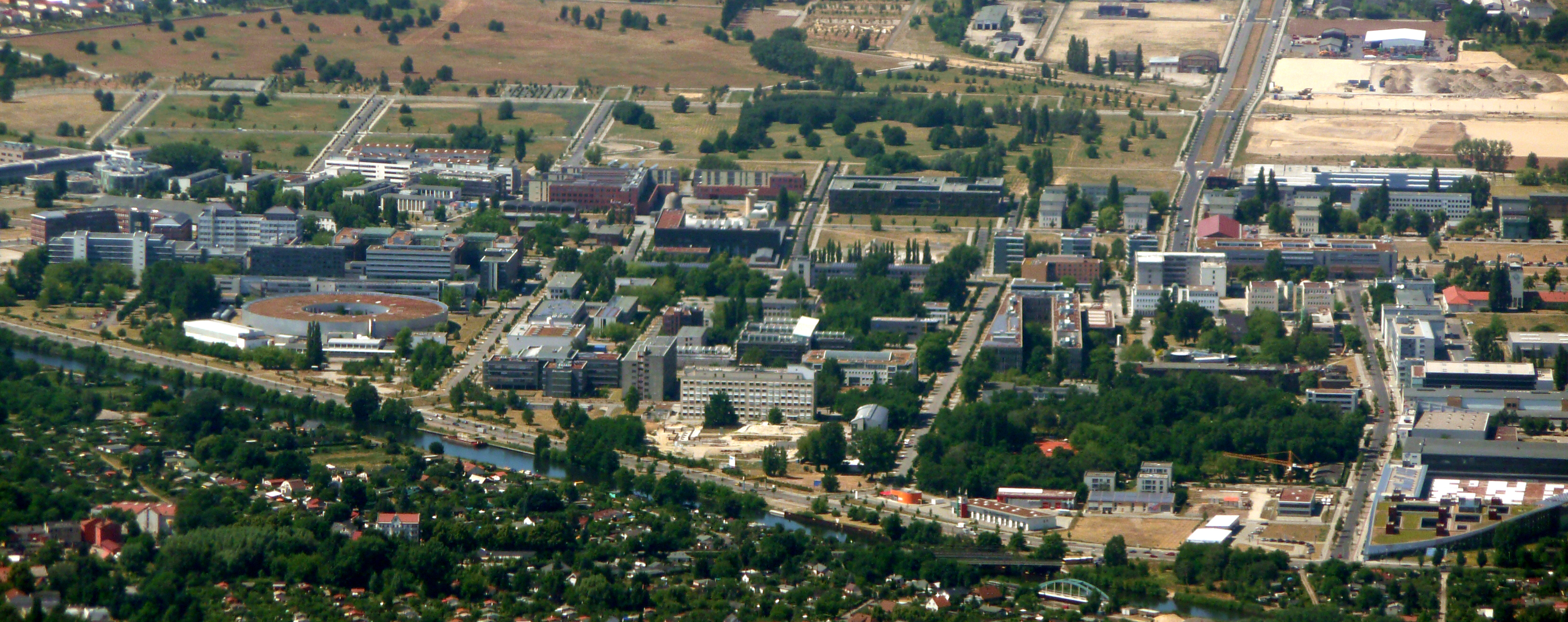
WISTA in Berlin (Silicon Allee)

Germany

- Leading Edge Technology Cluster it's OWL (Intelligent Technical Systems Ostwestfalen-Lippe), Bielefeld, Lemgo, Paderborn
- IT-Cluster Rhein-Main-Neckar, Frankfurt Rhine-Main and Rhine-Neckar
- Berlin: known as Silicon Allee, one of Europe's most dynamic technology, IT and startup centers
- Dresden (Silicon Saxony)
- Kaiserslautern (Silicon Woods)
- Dortmund (Ruhr Valley)
- Karlsruhe
- Mecklenburg-Western Pomerania: BioCon Valley for its life science and biotechnology clusters
- Munich (Isar Valley)
- Western Pomerania (IT Lagoon)
- WISTA (Science and Technology Park in Berlin-Adlershof)

Hungary

- Infopark: Budapest

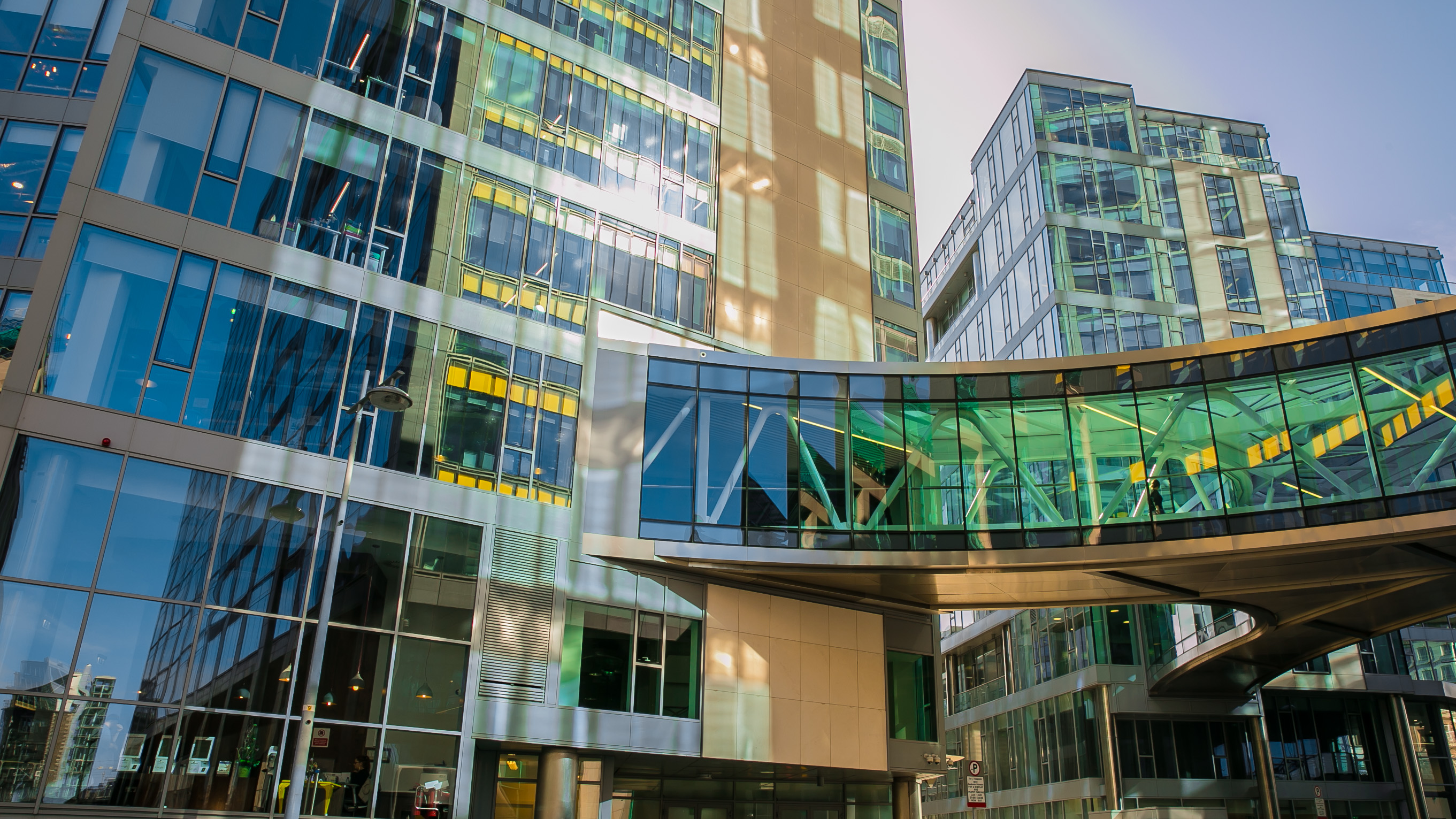
Google EMEA Headquarters in Dublin

Ireland

- Dublin (known as "Silicon Docks" or "The European Silicon Valley", due to its high number of technological EMEA centres)

Italy

- Apple iOS Developer Academy: Naples
- AREA Science Park: Trieste
- FabriQ: Milan
- GREAT Campus: Genoa
- Milan Innovation District (MIND): Milan
- VEGA: Venice

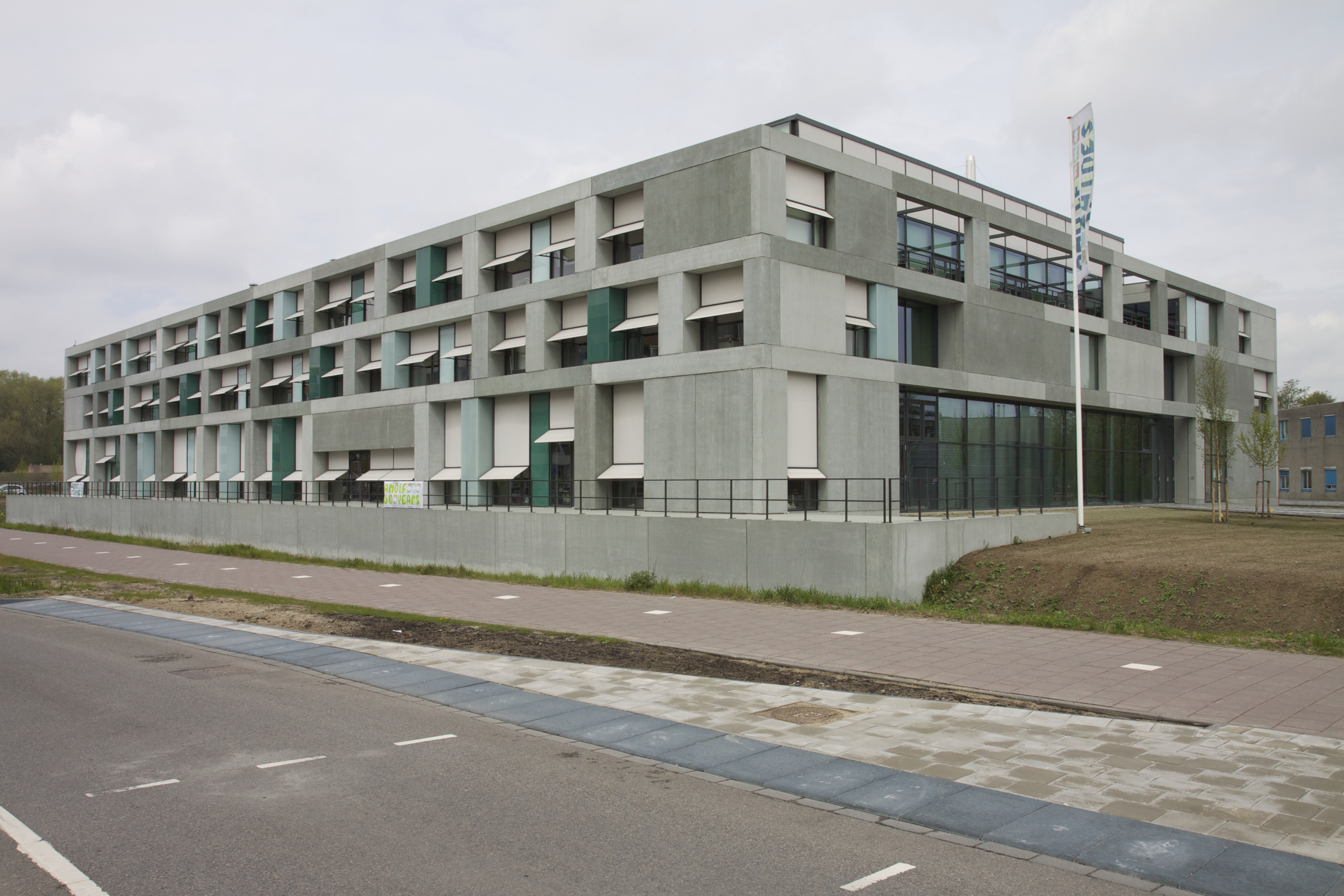
AMOLF at the Amsterdam Science Park

Netherlands

- Amsterdam Science Park: Amsterdam
- Biotech Campus Delft: Delft
- Delftechpark: Delft
- High Tech Campus Eindhoven: Eindhoven
- Leiden Bio Science Park: Leiden and Oegstgeest
- Novio Tech Campus: Nijmegen
- Technopolis Innovation Park Delft: Delft
- Utrecht Science Park: Utrecht
- Zernike Campus: Groningen

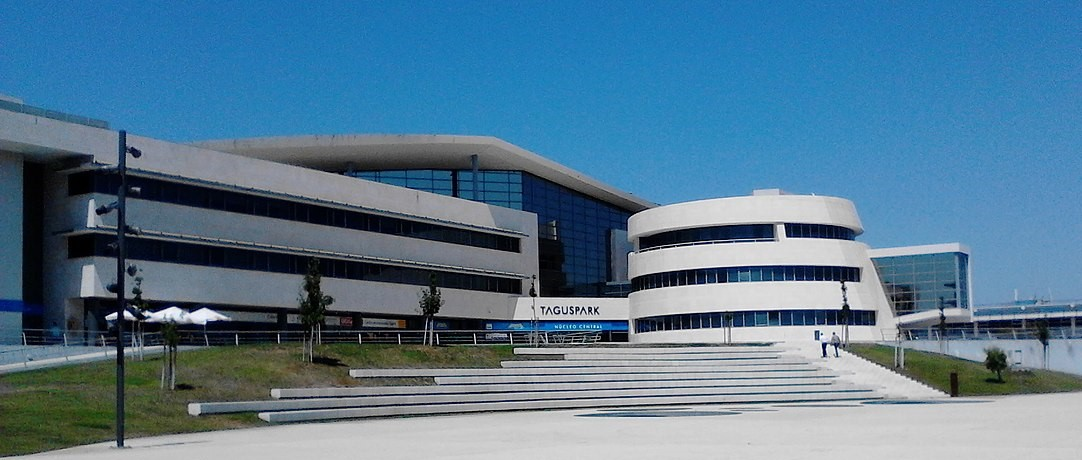
Congress Center of Taguspark

Portugal

- Taguspark
- Instituto Pedro Nunes: Coimbra

Russia

- Russian naukograds:
  - Akademgorodok, Novosibirsk
  - Skolkovo Innovation Center, Skolkovo, Moscow Oblast
  - Skolkovo Institute of Science and Technology
  - Biysk, Altai region
  - Dubna, Zhukovsky, Korolev, Protvino, Pushchino, Reutov, Troitsk, Fryazino, Chernogolovka, Skolkovo in Moscow region
  - Koltsovo, Novosibirsk region
  - Michurinsk, Tambov region
  - Obninsk, Kaluga region
  - Petergof near St. Petersburg
  - Sirius near Sochi
  - Innopolis, near Kazan'

Romania

- Bucharest
  - Grozăvești including Politehnica Campus, Regie Campus, Sema Park, Afi Park and Orhideea Offices
  - Pipera including Pipera Park, Aviației Offices and Piața Pipera Offices
  - Măgurele including the European laser technology institute
  - Romexpo including Expozitiei Offices, Tipografiei Offices and Jiului Offices
  - Militari including West Gate Offices
- Cluj-Napoca
  - Între Lacuri start-up offices
  - Jucu technology park
- Iași
  - Palas-Sfântul Andrei Offices
- Craiova
  - S200 technology park including Universitatea Campus
  - Ford automotive park
- Timișoara
  - Openville
  - Vox Technology Park
- Pitești
  - Dacia automotive park

Serbia

- Science Technology Park Belgrade
- NTP Novi Sad

Slovakia

- Kosice IT Valley: Košice

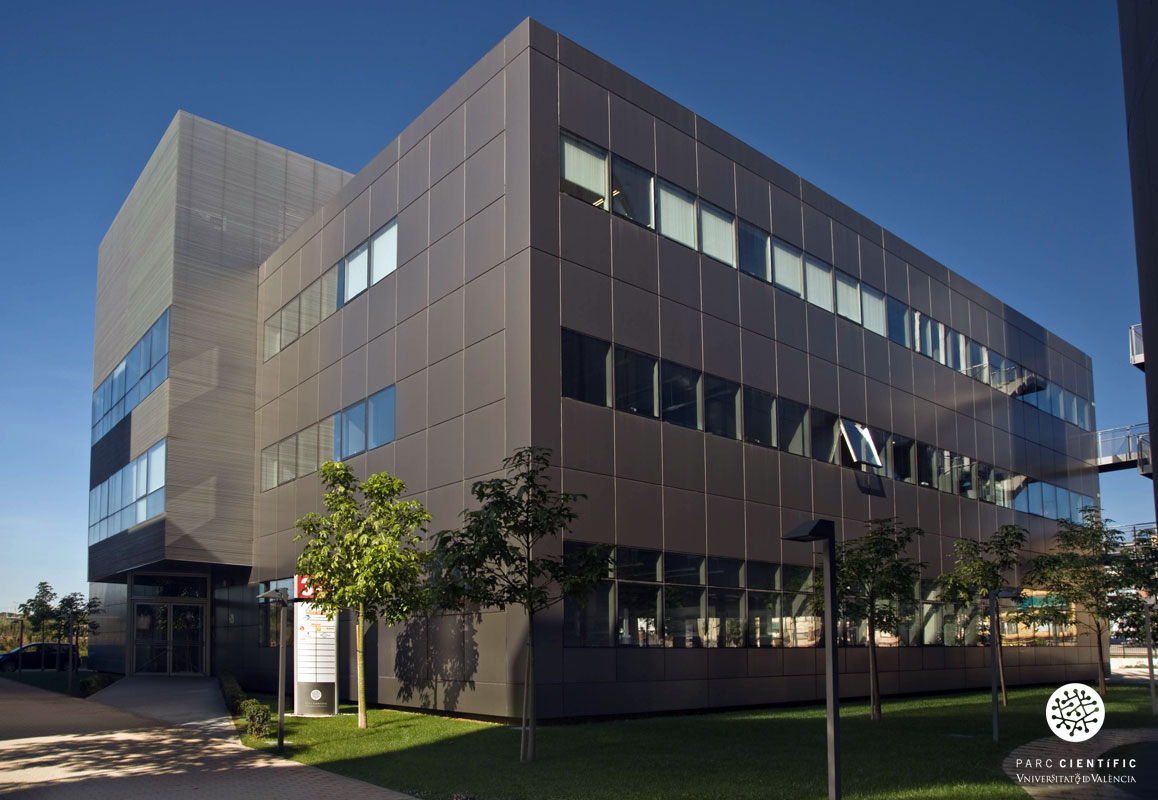
Building 3.CUE University Enterprise Centre of the University of Valencia Science Park business area

Spain

- Impact Hub, The Cube : Madrid
- 22@, Barcelona Science Park: Barcelona
- University of Valencia Science Park Valencia
- Andalusia Technology Park: Málaga
- Bizkaia Science and Technology Park: Biscay
- Cartuja 93: Seville

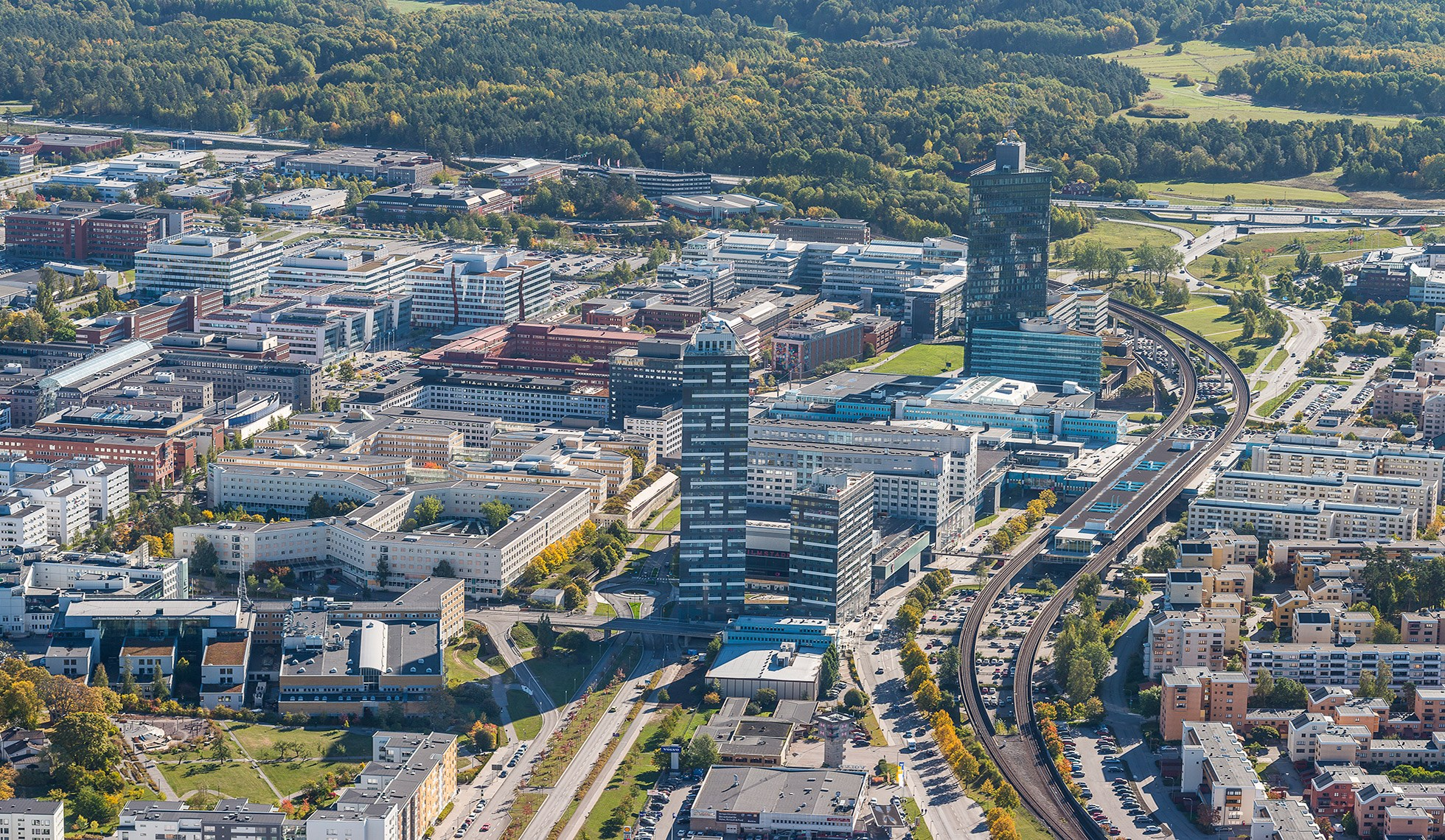
Aerial overview of central Kista

Sweden

- Kista: Stockholm
- Ideon Science Park: Lund
- Mjärdevi Science Park: Linköping

Switzerland

- Crypto Valley: Zug

Turkey

- ITU Arı Technopolis: (Istanbul)
- METU Technopolis: Ankara
- Hacettepe Technopolis: Ankara
- IT Valley (Turkish: Bilişim Vadisi)

United Kingdom

- Oxford Science Park: Oxford
- Silicon Corridor: M4 corridor, Reading, Berkshire
- Silicon Fen: Cambridge
- Silicon Glen: in Central Scotland
- Silicon Gorge: Bristol
- Silicon Roundabout: London
- Silicon Spa: Leamington Spa
- Cambridge Norwich Tech Corridor

Ukraine

- UNIT.city: Kyiv

Uzbekistan

- IT PARK Headquarters: Tashkent

=== Oceania ===
Australia

- South Eveleigh, Sydney, New South Wales
- Digital Harbour, Docklands, Melbourne, Victoria
- Macquarie Park, Sydney, New South Wales (including the Research Park, Macquarie University)
- Technology Park Bentley, Perth, Western Australia (adjacent to Curtin University)

== Places with "Silicon" names ==
The following list contains places with "Silicon" names, that is, places with nicknames inspired by the Silicon Valley nickname given to part of the San Francisco Bay Area:

=== Africa ===
- Silicon Cape: Cape Town, South Africa
- Silicon Lagoon: Lagos, Nigeria
- Silicon Mountain: Buea, Cameroon
- Silicon Savannah: Nairobi, Kenya

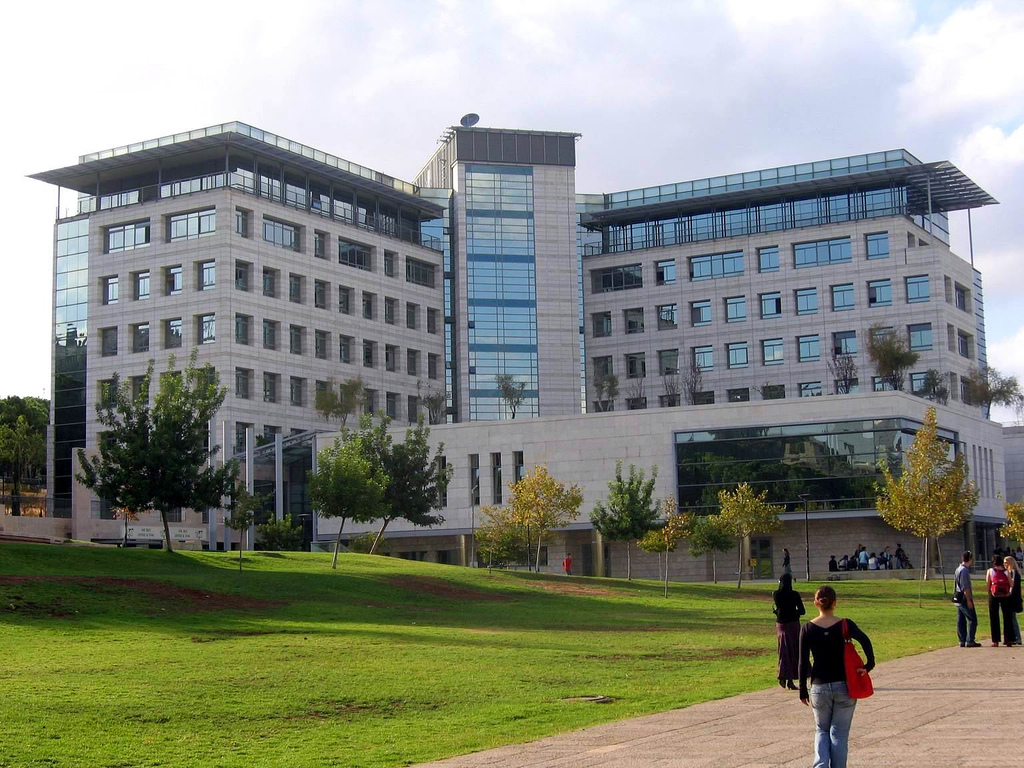
Technion Computer Science Faculty, in Haifa, part of Silicon Wadi, Israel

=== Middle East ===
==== Israel ====
- Silicon Wadi, Israel

==== United Arab Emirates ====
The Dubai Silicon Oasis Headquarters

- Dubai Silicon Oasis: Dubai, United Arab Emirates

=== Americas ===
==== Brazil ====
- Brazilian Silicon Valley: Campinas, Brazil
- Silicon Island: Florianópolis, Brazil

==== Canada ====
- Canada's Technology Triangle: Waterloo, Ontario, a growing technology centre hub started by the creation of BlackBerry.
- Silicon Valley North: Ottawa, Ontario, Canada's largest concentration of technology companies and technology employees.
- Silicon Vineyard: Okanagan Valley, British Columbia

==== Chile ====
- Chilecon Valley: Santiago, Chile. The name was first coined by The Economist. Santiago is home of Start-Up Chile, the most important government sponsored accelerator worldwide.

==== Costa Rica ====
- Silicon Paradise: Southern Nicoya Peninsula: Santa Teresa de Cobano, Delicias, Montezuma.

==== Mexico ====
- Mexican Silicon Valley/Silicon Valley South: Jalisco, Mexico
- Silicon Border: Mexicali, Mexico

==== United States ====
- Philicon Valley (also known as "Silicon Valley Forge"): Area close to Philadelphia, in the suburbs of Valley Forge and Wayne
- Silicon Alley: Originally a portion of Manhattan in New York City, specifically Broadway, the Flatiron District, SoHo, and TriBeCa. Now encompasses the general NYC tech sphere.
- Silicon Anchor: Norfolk–Virginia Beach metropolitan area
- Silicon Basin: Columbus, Ohio
- Silicon Bayou: New Orleans, Louisiana
- Silicon Beach: Santa Monica, California and the Westside area of the Los Angeles metro, more specifically Culver City, Venice Beach, Westwood, Manhattan Beach, Malibu, Playa del Rey, and Marina del Rey; also used to refer to the San Diego area in the name of the 1980s software developer Silicon Beach Software. There is also Silicon Beach in South Florida in the Miami area.
- Silicon Coast: Orange County, California
- Silicon Desert: Chandler, Arizona
- Silicon Forest: Portland, Oregon
- Silicon Harbor: Charleston, South Carolina
- Silicon Hill: Washington, D.C.
- Silicon Hills: Austin, Texas
- Silicon Hollar: Boone, North Carolina
- Silicon Mountain: Front Range Urban Corridor, Colorado (Denver, Boulder, Fort Collins, Colorado Springs)
- Silicon Peach: Atlanta home to Georgia Institute of Technology as well as VMware Airwatch, Google ATL, Kabbage, Pindrop Security, and many venture capital firms
- Silicon Prairie
  - Dallas-Fort Worth Silicon Prairie: Dallas-Fort Worth Metroplex, Texas
  - Illinois Silicon Prairie: Chicago and Urbana–Champaign
  - Midwest Silicon Prairie: Omaha, St. Louis, Des Moines, Kansas City
  - Wyoming Silicon Prairie, also called the "Silicon Range": Jackson Hole
- Silicon Sandbar: Cape Cod, Massachusetts
- Silicon Shire: Eugene, Oregon
- Silicon Shore: Santa Barbara, California
- Silicon Slopes: Utah County and southern Salt Lake County, Utah
- Silicon Surf: Santa Cruz, California
- Silicon Valley: San Jose, California (the original "Silicon" namesake)
- Silicon Valley North: Seattle, Washington
- Silicon Valley of the Sierras: Nevada County, California
- Silicotton Valley: Huntsville, Alabama
- Silicon Spuds: Idaho Falls, Idaho

=== Asia ===
- Silicon Harbor: Hong Kong, China
- Silicon Island: Kyushu, Japan
- Silicon Peninsula: Dalian, China
- Silcion Valley of South Korea: Gumi, Gyeongbuk
- China's Silicon Valley: Shenzhen or Zhongguancun, Haidian District, Beijing, People's Republic of China (PRC).
- Silicon Valley of India (sometimes referred to as Silicon Plateau): Bangalore
- Silicon Valley of Indonesia (also known as Subang Valley): Subang, Subang, West Java, Indonesia
- Silicon Valley of Taiwan: Hsinchu, Taiwan
- Silicon Valley of Hong Kong: Cyberport and Hong Kong Science Park
- Silicon Valley of the East: Bayan Lepas Free Industrial Zone, George Town, Penang, Malaysia
- Silicon Island, George Town, Penang, Malaysia
- Silicon Wadi: The coastal plain of Israel, stretching from Haifa to Tel Aviv and Rehovot and expanding inland to Jerusalem
- Teheran Valley: Gangnam District, Seoul, South Korea
- Pangyo Techno Valley: Seongnam-si, Gyeonggi-do, South Korea

=== Europe ===
==== France ====
- Silicon Valley, Grenoble-Grésivaudan
- Silicon Valley, Paris-Saclay
- Silicon Valley, Sophia Antipolis
- Silicon Sentier: Paris, France

==== Germany ====
- BioCon Valley: Mecklenburg and Western Pomerania
- Isar Valley: Munich, Bavaria
- Medical Valley: Erlangen, Bavaria
- Silicon Allee (English: Silicon Avenue): Berlin (incl. WISTA)
- Silicon Saxony: Dresden, Saxony, Elbe river valley around the city
- Silicon Woods: Kaiserslautern, Rhineland-Palatinate

==== Greece ====
- Silicon Islands: Patras with past and present companies like Atmel, Samsung, Citrix, Dialog Semiconductor, Think Silicon and Intel

==== Ireland ====
- Silicon Docks: Dublin, Ireland. Contains the European headquarters of companies like Facebook, Twitter, Google, LinkedIn, and many others.

==== Italy ====
- Silicon Moda: Milan, Italy.

==== Norway ====
- SiliconFjord: Oslofjord region
- Silicon Harbor: Trondheim, Norway.

==== Russia ====
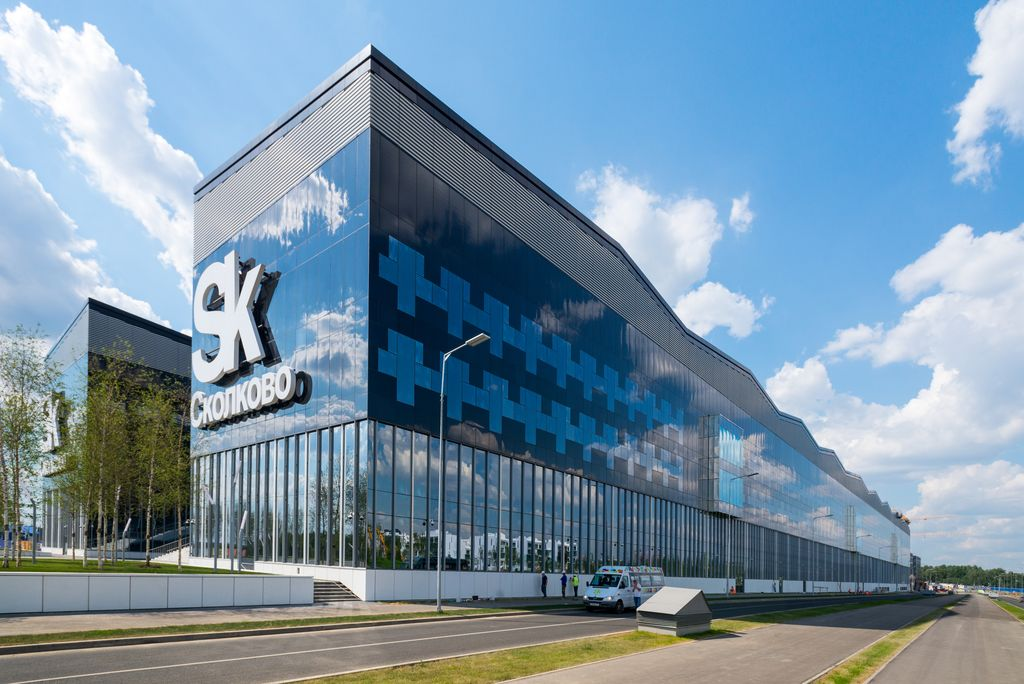
Skolkovo Innovation Center

- Russian Silicon Valley:
  - Innopolis
  - Skolkovo innovation center
  - Zelenograd, Moscow
- Silicon Sloboda: Moscow
- Silicon Taiga: Akademgorodok

==== Switzerland ====
- Ticino Valley: Technology cluster in the Lugano area

==== United Kingdom ====
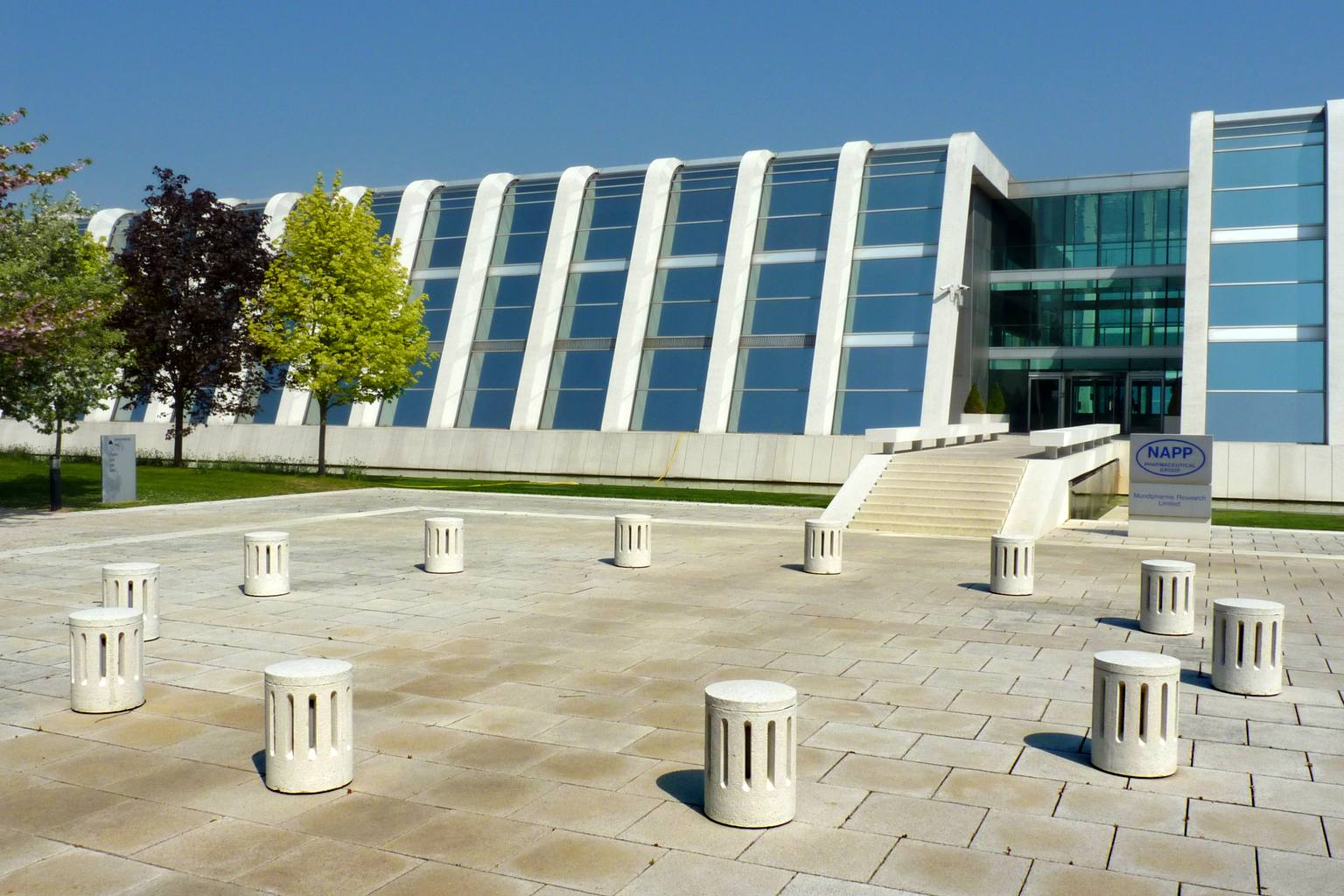
Cambridge Science Park

- Cwm Silicon (Newport, Wales)
- Silicon Alley (Pink Lane, Newcastle Upon Tyne, England)
- Silicon Beach (Bournemouth, England)
- Silicon Canal (Birmingham, England): the area along the Digbeth Branch Canal from Aston Science Park, through Millennium Point to Digbeth.
- Silicon Corridor (the M4 corridor)
- Silicon Dock (Belfast)
- Silicon Fen (Cambridge, England)
- Silicon Forest (Newark, Nottinghamshire): Silicon Forest consists of various businesses from in and around the Newark and Sherwood area that specialise in technology and innovation.
- Silicon Glen (Central Belt, Scotland)
- Silicon Gorge (Bristol, England)
- Silicon Mall (London, England): the area between Pall Mall and Victoria in London
- Silicon Pier (Brighton, England)
- Silicon Roundabout: the area around Old Street Roundabout in London (East London Tech City)
- Silicon Shipyard (Newcastle upon Tyne, Gateshead, Middlesbrough)
- Silicon Spa (Leamington Spa, Warwickshire): Notable for a relatively high concentration of video game developers.
- Silicon Walk (Edinburgh, Scotland)

=== Oceania ===
==== Australia ====
- Silicon Mallee (Adelaide, Australia; Mallee, an Australian aboriginal word for the land area around Adelaide covered by low, scrubby dwarf eucalyptus "mallee" vegetation)
- Silicon St, Sydney" An inner city colloquial district including Ultimo/Pyrmont along Harris St spanning 10 km^{2} from UTS to Google including Fishburners
- Silicon Beach: A term used by those in the Australian startup community to refer to the startup ecosystem within Australian cities, in particular by Meetup groups like Silicon Beach Sydney and Silicon Beach Adelaide

==== New Zealand ====
- Silicon Welly (Wellington in New Zealand)

== See also ==
- Technopole
- List of research parks
- Research-intensive clusters
