= Silicon Mountain =

Coordinates: 4.1527°N 9.241°E

- Town
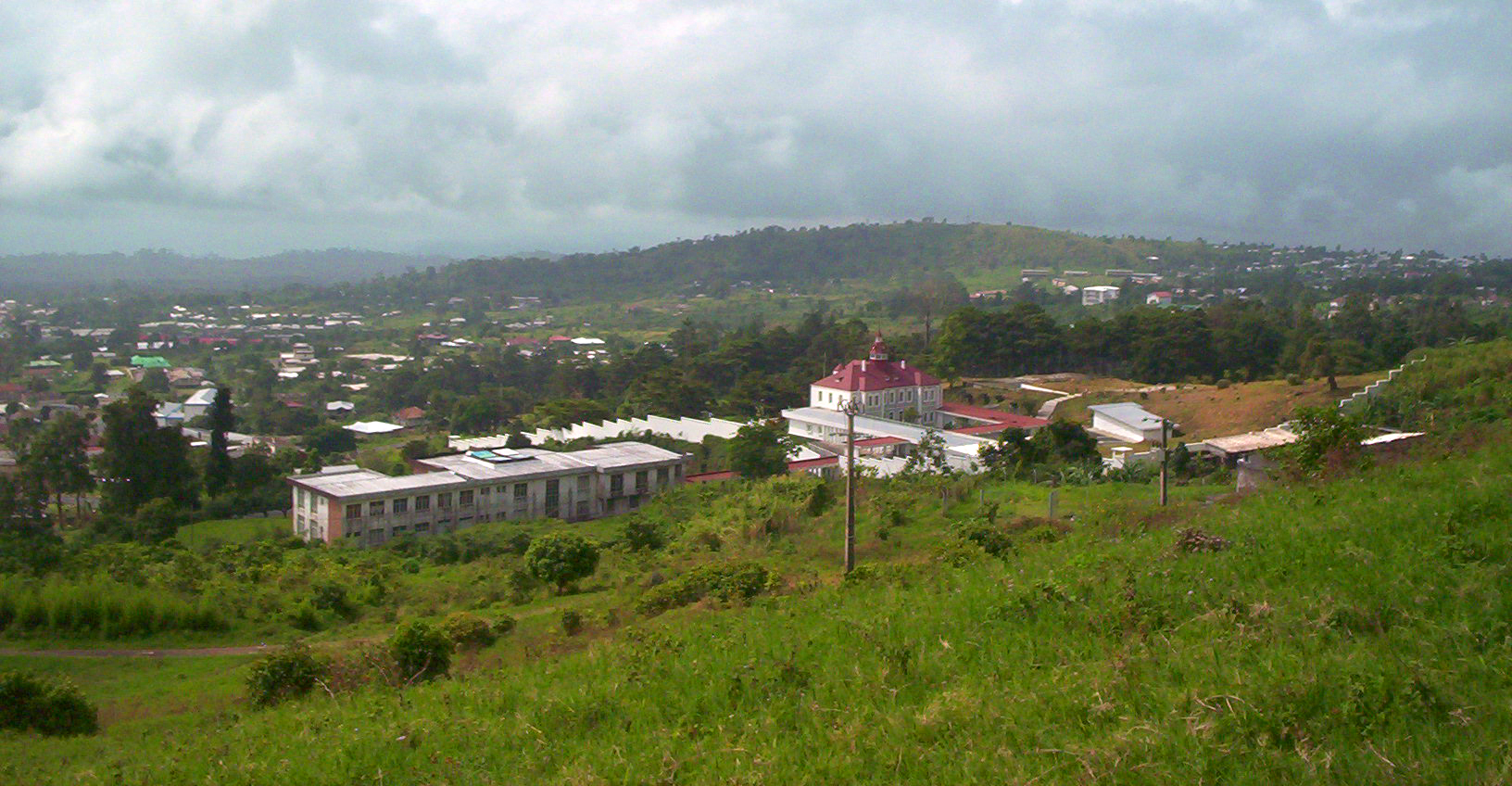
- Buea (Silicon Mountain harbor) from the foot of Mount Cameroon
- Nickname: Silicon Mountain
- Interactive map of Silicon Mountain
- Country: Cameroon
- Region: South West Region
- Division: Fako
- Time zone: UTC+01:00

Silicon Mountain is a nickname coined to represent the technology ecosystem (cluster) in the Mountain area of Cameroon, with its epicenter in Buea. The name refers to Mount Fako. Silicon Mountain is currently home to tech startups and a growing community of developers, designers, business professionals as well as universities such as the University of Buea, Catholic University Institute of Buea, Saint Monica University and many others. This region occupies the entire Fako Division of the South West Region of Cameroon. The phrase originally was the de facto reference to the Buea Tech Community popularized during local tech community meetups such as BarCamp Cameroon 2013, Google I/O Extended Buea 2015 and the Kamer Design Meetups; but has eventually come to refer to the community of developers, creatives, organizers, business professionals, universities in the area.

== Origin of term ==
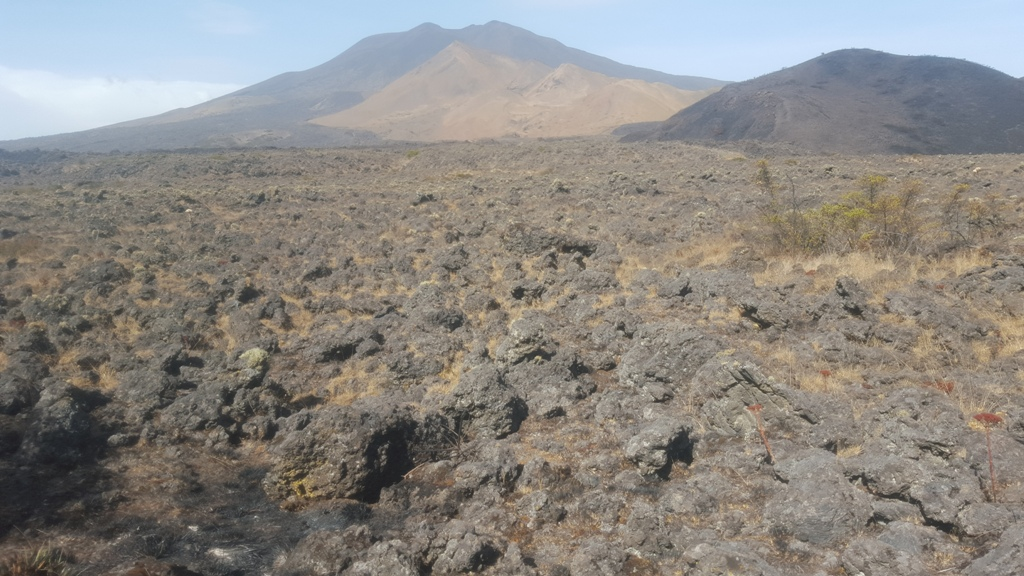
Landscape of Mount Fako

The Silicon Mountain is a term used to refer to the tech ecosystem (cluster) in Fako division of Cameroon with epicenter Buea. The term is a play ( phrasal portmanteau ) on Silicon Valley and Mount Fako (which is the most dominant feature of Cameroon's topography and the highest geographical point in West and Central Africa). It was first used publicly by Rebecca Enonchong at the BarCamp Cameroon conference which took place at Catholic University Institute Of Buea, Buea in 2013.

== History ==
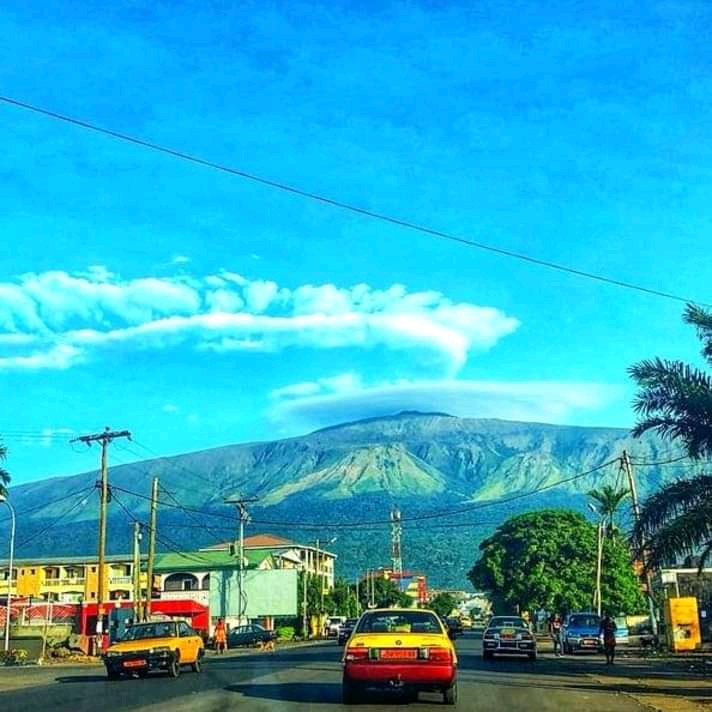
Buea city

Silicon Mountain is located in and around the city of Buea, which according to social scientists was founded by a hunter in search of game. Eye Njie Tama Lifanje came from the Bomboko clan behind the Buea Mountain (Mount Cameroon or Mount Fako). On that fateful day he founded Buea, he had set out in search of animals but there were no game to be hunted only a vast piece of hospitable land that could harbor his family. Eyé Njie named it “Mwea”, meaning, hospitable land for farming. The settlement soon grew into a clan but made tardy progress until the later part of the 19th century, when there was an influx of Europeans into Africa for exploration and colonialism purposes. Tea growing is an important local industry, especially in Tole. Buea was the colonial capital of the German Kamerun from 1901 to 1919, and the capital of the Southern Cameroons from 1949 until 1961. The German colonial administration in Buea was temporarily suspended during the eruption of Mount Cameroon from 28 April – June 1909. Originally, Buea's population consisted mainly of the Bakweri people. However, due to its position as the defunct capital of the Federated State Of West Cameroon, regional capital of the South West and university town, it has attracted a significant number of other ethnic groups.

The epicenter of the Silicon Mountain, Buea, hosts the University of Buea, the first Anglo-Saxon-styled university of Cameroon, alongside the Catholic University Institute Of Buea, the Pan African Institute Of Development, just to name a few. The city still has a handful of colonial era buildings, notably the palatial former residence of the German governor, Jesko von Puttkamer. Other German colonial buildings especially the Prime Minister's Lodge (Schloss) and the Bismarks' fountain are still standing, albeit some of them suffer from lack of maintenance and old age. As of 2010, a study showed that about 3000,000 people live in Buea ( including Bokwaongo, Muea, Bomaka, Tole, Mile 16 (Bolifamba), Mile 17, Mile 15, Mile 14 (Dibanda), Bova, Bonjongo, Likombe, Buasa, and surrounding villages). It also hosts the Nigerian Consulate in Anglophone Cameroon and is the main operational hub of the Naigahelp medical aid organisation.

In 2017, businesses in Silicon Mountain were negatively affected by several internet shutdowns that authorities enacted in the English-speaking areas of Cameroon in an effort to clamp down on criticism of the government.

== Silicon Mountain Annual Conference ==
The Buea Tech ecosystem starting from 2015 organizes the annual Silicon Mountain conference popularly referred to as #SMConf (2021 hash tag) or SMCON (as of 2023) which brings together over 500+ like-minded creatives and hackers from the Mountain Area and around Africa for two days of sessions, labs, speakers. It features tech talks, design and code labs. The Silicon Mountain Conference has the following;

SESSION Categories

- Creativity Workshops
- Panel Discussions
- Community Pavilion
- Startup Booths

== Universities, Colleges, Professional Schools ==
- University of Buea
- Catholic University Institute of Buea
- Saint Monica University
- University College of Technology
- Trustech Institute of Technology
- St. Joseph's College, Sasse
- Buea Institute of Technology
- PanAfrican University Institute Buea.
- Higher Institute of Management Sciences
- Bilingual Grammar School, Molyko
- Baptist High School, Buea
- Bishop Rogan College, Soppo
- Fotabe Universal Higher Institute of Cameroon
- Fotabe Entrepreneurial leadership academy
- HIBMAT University Institute of Buea - HUIB

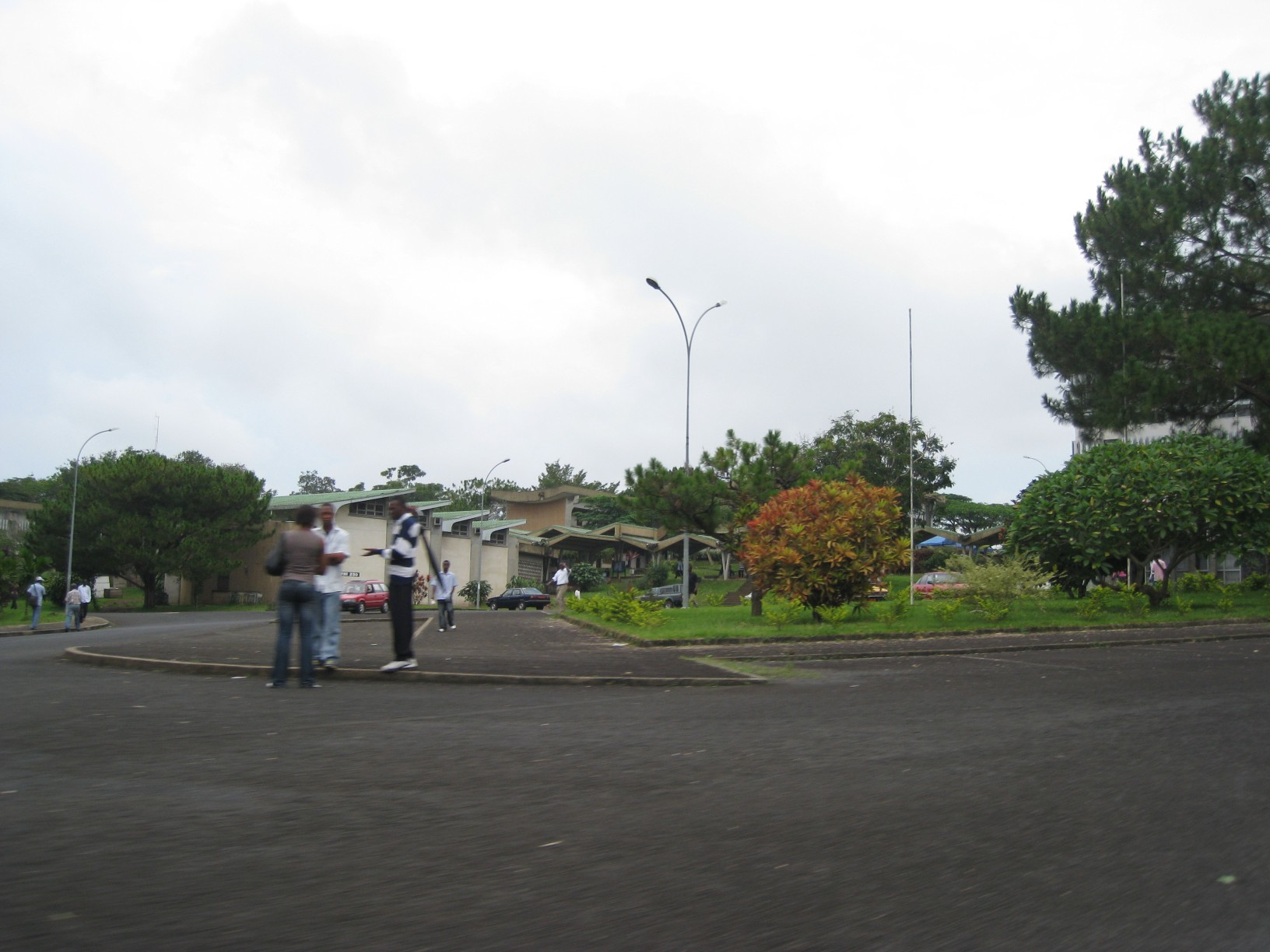
University of Buea Campus

== See also ==
- List of places with "Silicon" names around the world
- List of research parks around the world
- List of technology centers around the world
- Silicon Valley
- San Francisco Bay Area
- Silicon Savannah
- Konza Technology City
- Yabacon Valley
