= JTP =

JTP may refer to:

- Jai Telangana Party, an Indian political party
- Jenkintown Posse, Barry and his friends on The Goldbergs (2013 TV series)
- Joe the Plumber
- Johor Technology Park
- Journal of Transpersonal Psychology
- Journal of Theoretical Politics
- Justin Pawlak (born 1979), American drifting driver
- .jtp, an extension given to Microsoft Windows Journal template files
