= Canada's Top 100 Employers =

Annual list promoting exceptional employers

Canada's Top 100 Employers is an annual editorial competition first held in 1999. Winners are announced each October in The Globe and Mail newspaper. From 1999 to 2006, the list was published as an annual paperback book in Canada. Beginning in 2007, the list and the editors' Reasons for Selection were published online each year. Beginning in 2014, the winners were also announced in a national magazine published in The Globe and Mail.

== Competitions ==
Employers complete a single application, at a fee, to be considered for the national competition, as well as 18 regional and special-interest competitions managed with a variety of newspaper and magazine partners across Canada:

| Competition | Geographic Area | Announced in | First Published |
|---|---|---|---|
| Canada's Top 100 Employers | National | The Globe and Mail | 2001 |
| Canada's Top Small & Medium Employers (SME) | National | The Globe and Mail | 2014 |
| Ten Best Companies to Work For | National | Financial Post | 2006 |
| Canada's Top Employers for Young People | National | The Globe and Mail | 2002 |
| Canada's Best Diversity Employers | National | The Globe and Mail | 2008 |
| Canada's Greenest Employers | National | The Globe and Mail | 2008 |
| Canada's Top Family-Friendly Employers | National | The Globe and Mail | 2002 |
| Top Employers for Canadians Over 40 | National | The Globe and Mail | 2002 |
| British Columbia's Top Employers | British Columbia | The Vancouver Sun | 2005 |
| Alberta's Top Employers | Alberta | Calgary Herald & Edmonton Journal | 2005 |
| Saskatchewan's Top Employers | Saskatchewan | Leader-Post & The StarPhoenix | 2005 |
| Manitoba's Top Employers | Manitoba | Winnipeg Free Press | 2006 |
| Greater Toronto's Top Employers | Greater Toronto Area | The Globe and Mail (Metro ed.) | 2006 |
| Waterloo Area's Top Employers | Canada's Technology Triangle | Waterloo Region Record & Guelph Mercury | 2007 |
| Hamilton-Niagara's Top Employers | Hamilton, Burlington & Niagara Region | The Hamilton Spectator | 2007 |
| National Capital Region's Top Employers | National Capital Region (Canada) | Ottawa Citizen | 2005 |
| Montreal's Top Employers | Greater Montreal | Montreal Gazette | 2005 |
| Atlantic Canada's Top Employers | Atlantic Canada | Atlantic Business Magazine | 2010 |
| Nova Scotia's Top Employers | Nova Scotia | The Chronicle-Herald | 2010 |

== Criticism ==
In 2022, the list was criticized for its inclusion of Suncor despite worker injuries. The list is not prepared by Globe and Mail journalists.
