= Beijing-Tianjin-Shijiazhuang Hi-Tech Industrial Belt =

Concentrated Belt of National Hi-Tech Industrial Zones in Northern China

Beijing-Tianjin-Shijiazhuang Hi-Tech Industrial Belt (Jing-Jin-Shi Hi-Tech Industrial Belt, Chinese: 京津石高新技术产业带), including four main national Hi-Tech Industrial Development Zones in Beijing, Tianjin, Shijiazhuang and Baoding, i.e. Zhongguancun, Tianjin Binhai Hi-Tech Zone, Shijiazhuang Hi-Tech Zone and Baoding Hi-Tech Zone. The place is one of the main Hi-Tech Industrial Belts in China (Beijing-Tianjin-Shijiazhuang, Shanghai-Nanjing-Hangzhou and Pearl River Delta).

Peking University, Tsinghua University and many institutes of Chinese Academy of Sciences are located here, so it is rich in intellectual resources. It also has a convenient transportation. There are four main airports in this area: Beijing Capital International Airport, Beijing Daxing International Airport, Tianjin Binhai International Airport and Shijiazhuang Zhengding International Airport. Beijing-Tianjin-Tanggu Expressway, Beijing-Shijiazhuang Expressway, Tianjin-Baoding Expressway, Tianjin-Shijiazhuang Expressway, Beijing-Shijiazhuang High-Speed Rail, Tianjin-Baoding High-Speed Rail, Beijing-Tianjin Inter-City Rail and Beijing-Xiong'an Inter-City Rail make Inter-City transportation in this region effective.

The belt is also the heartland of Jing-Jin-Ji and Bohai Economic Rim.

== See also ==
- List of technology centers
