= Silicon Mountain (Denver) =

Silicon Mountain Denver / Boulder / Colorado Springs
- Tech hub
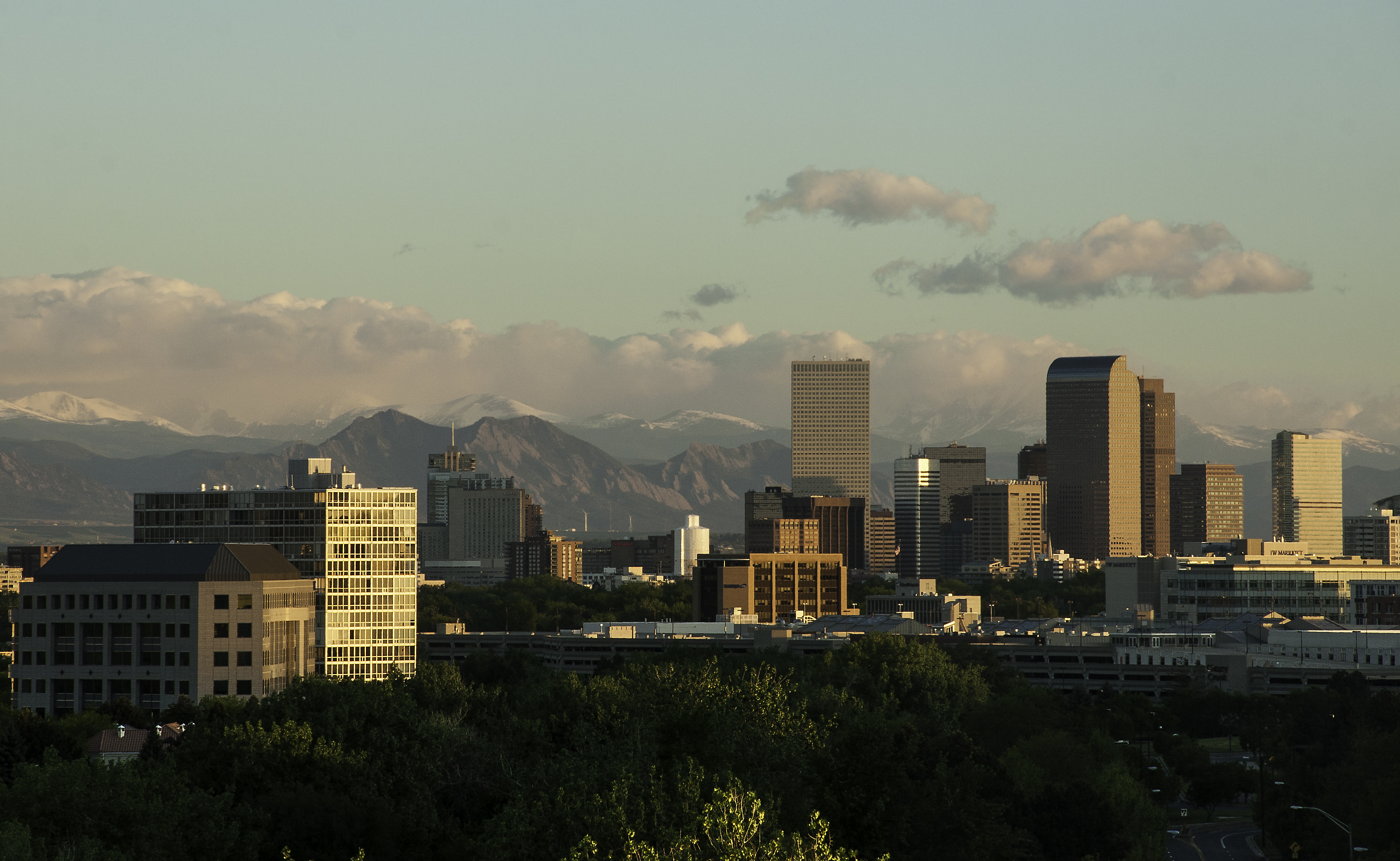

- Country: United States
- State: Colorado
- City: Denver

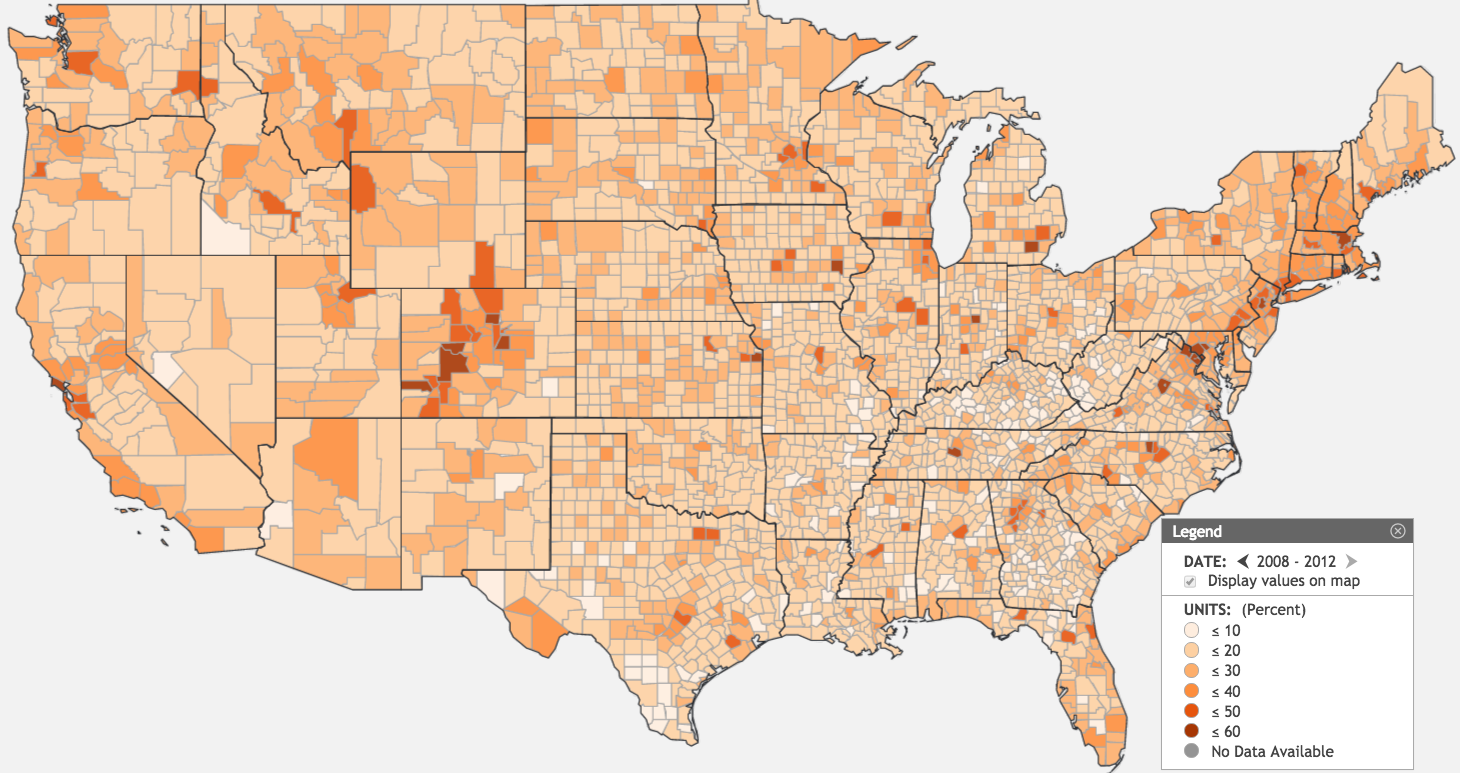
Central Colorado has a high rate of educated people with at least a bachelor's degree. List of colleges and universities in Colorado

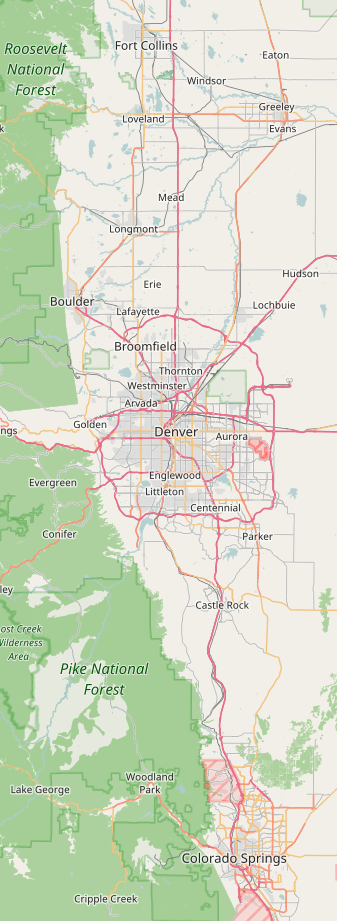
Silicon Mountain spans from Fort Collins, Boulder, Denver, to Colorado Springs

Silicon Mountain, also known as the "Silicon Flatirons", is a nickname given to the tech hub in the Denver, Colorado metropolitan area and Colorado Springs, Colorado metropolitan area. The name is analogous to Silicon Valley, but refers to the Rocky Mountains beyond the skyline. Denver startups raised $401 million in 2015, and Boulder startups raised $183 million in 2015.

== Startups ==
- SolidFire
- Zayo Group
- Dot Hill Systems
- AlchemyAPI

== Venture capital ==
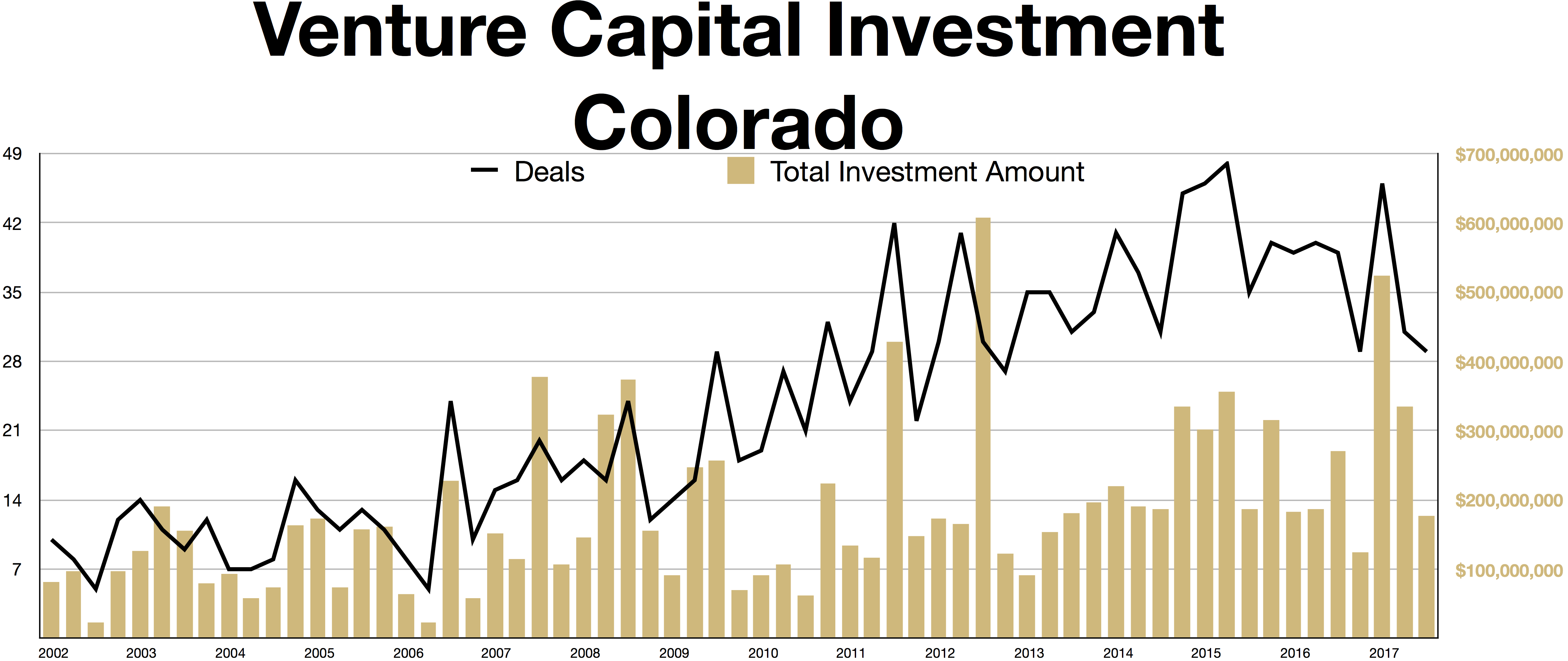
Colorado Venture Capital Investment

== Incubators ==
- The Founder Institute
- Techstars
- Innovation Pavilion

== Fortune 500 Companies ==
- Ball Corporation
- CH2M
- DaVita
- Dish Network
- Envision Healthcare
- Level 3 Communications
- Newmont
- Qurate Retail Group
- Western Union

== See also ==
- Denver Tech Center
- Northern Colorado Economic Development Corporation
- List of companies with Denver area operations
- List of places with "Silicon" names

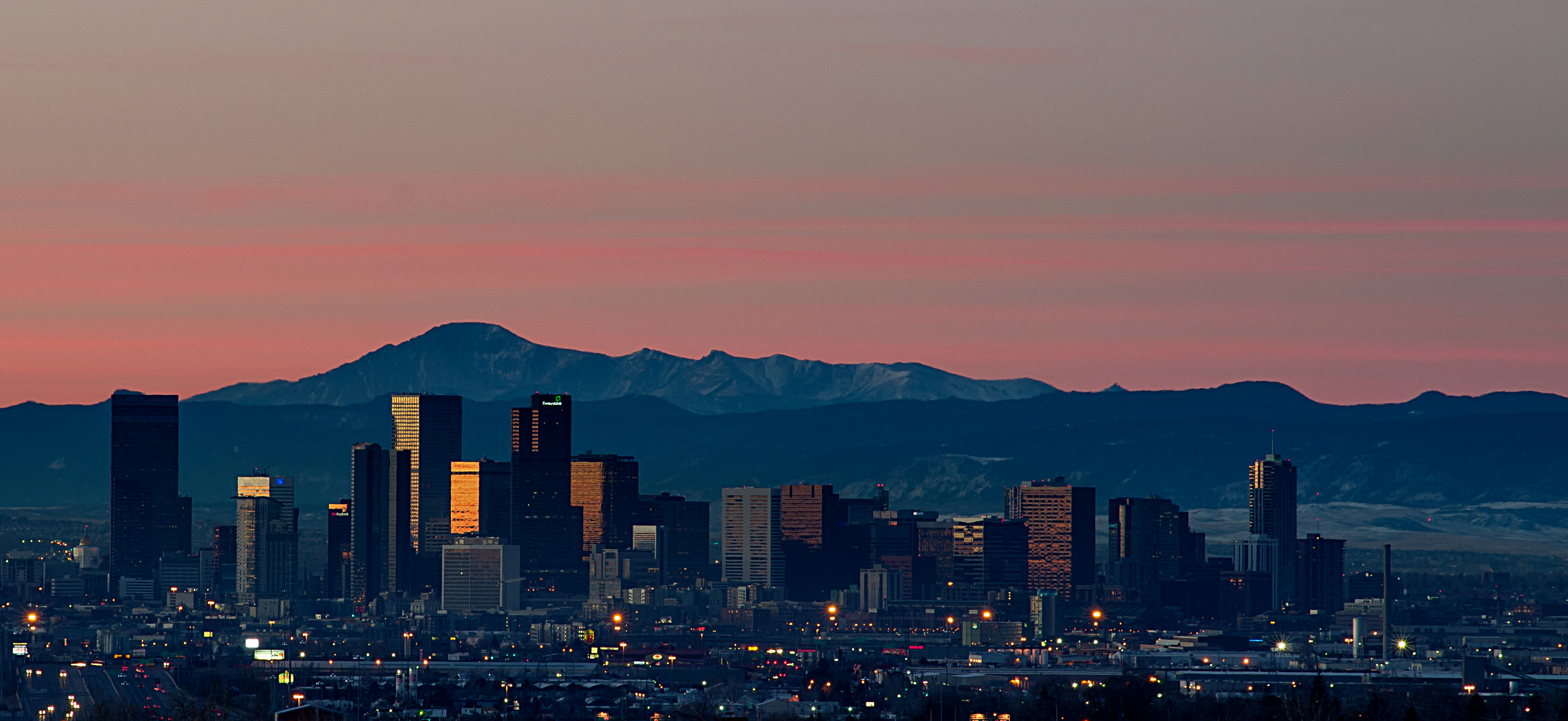
