= Optics Valley =

Business region in southern Arizona

Coordinates: 32.19°N 110.88°W

Optics Valley is a region in southern Arizona, centered on Tucson, that is home to a high concentration of optics companies spawned by research at the University of Arizona. Based on the idea of a technology cluster, akin Silicon Valley, Optics Valley is known not only for its optics industry and research but also for the astronomical observatories located in the mountains of southern Arizona. These observatories benefit from clear skies and isolated peaks, creating superior observing conditions.

== History ==
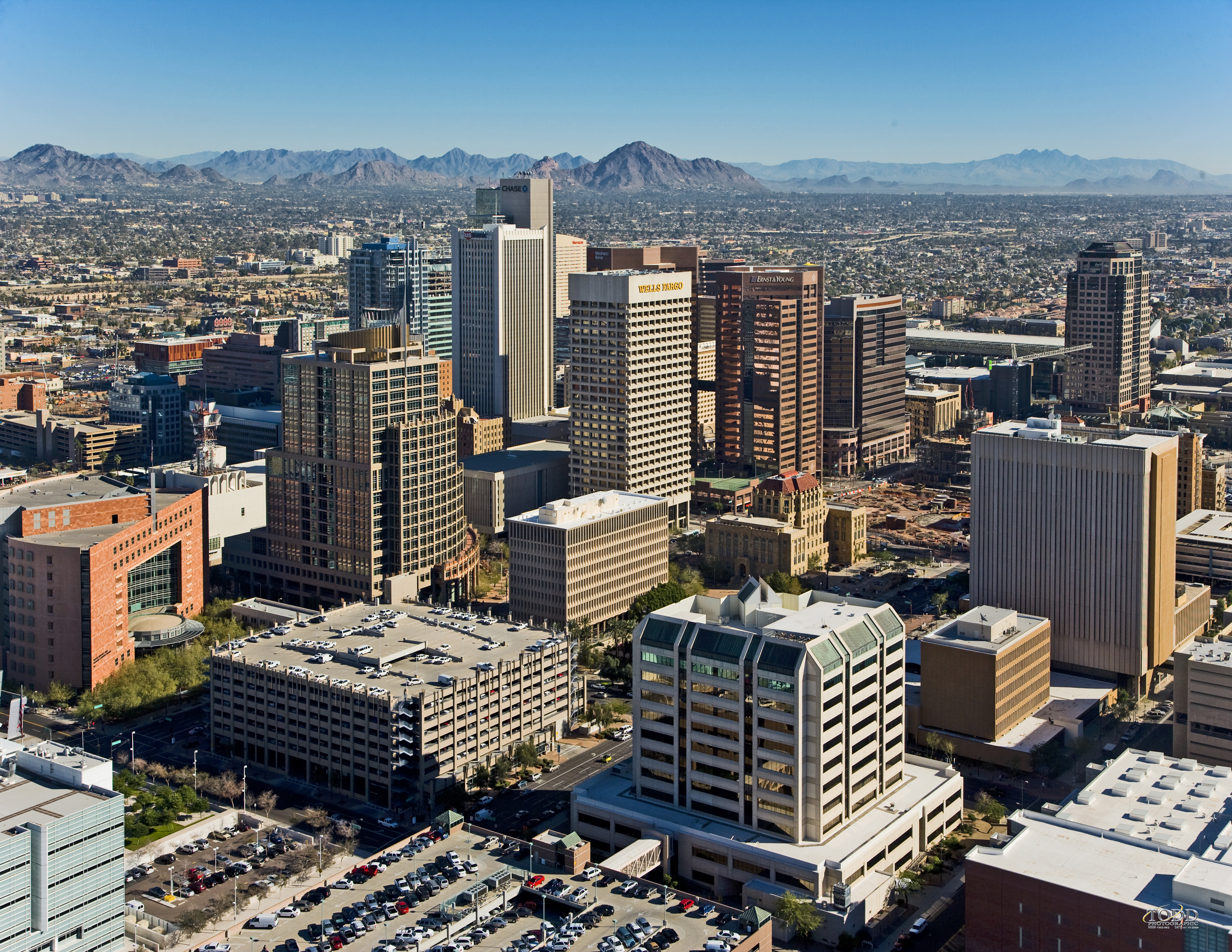
Phoenix, Arizona skyline. Phoenix is a technology and advanced manufacturing hub where optics and photonics technologies are developed and applied broadly in aerospace, automotive, defense, biomedicine, and semiconductor industries.

The term "Optics Valley" was first coined by a BusinessWeek article in 1992, which identified the small but bustling region encompassing Tucson as home to many optics and nanotechnology companies. These companies were responsible for bringing in hundreds of millions in revenue and creating thousands of high-income jobs.

Arizona's optics cluster can trace its history back to 1992, when Robert Breault was a founding member of the Arizona Optics Industry Association (AOIA) and “mentored many light scientists eager to create companies that develop and sell different types of equipment, including lasers, telescopes, endoscopy machines and camera lenses, all of which use light, or optics, to enhance images.”

AOIA, the predecessor to today's Optics Valley Committee, held its first meeting with 55 companies, according to Breault. More recent estimates put the number at over 300 individual organizations in the optics industry in Arizona. In 2016, AOIA was dissolved, and the optics cluster initiative was transferred to Optics Valley, a committee of the Arizona Technology Council.

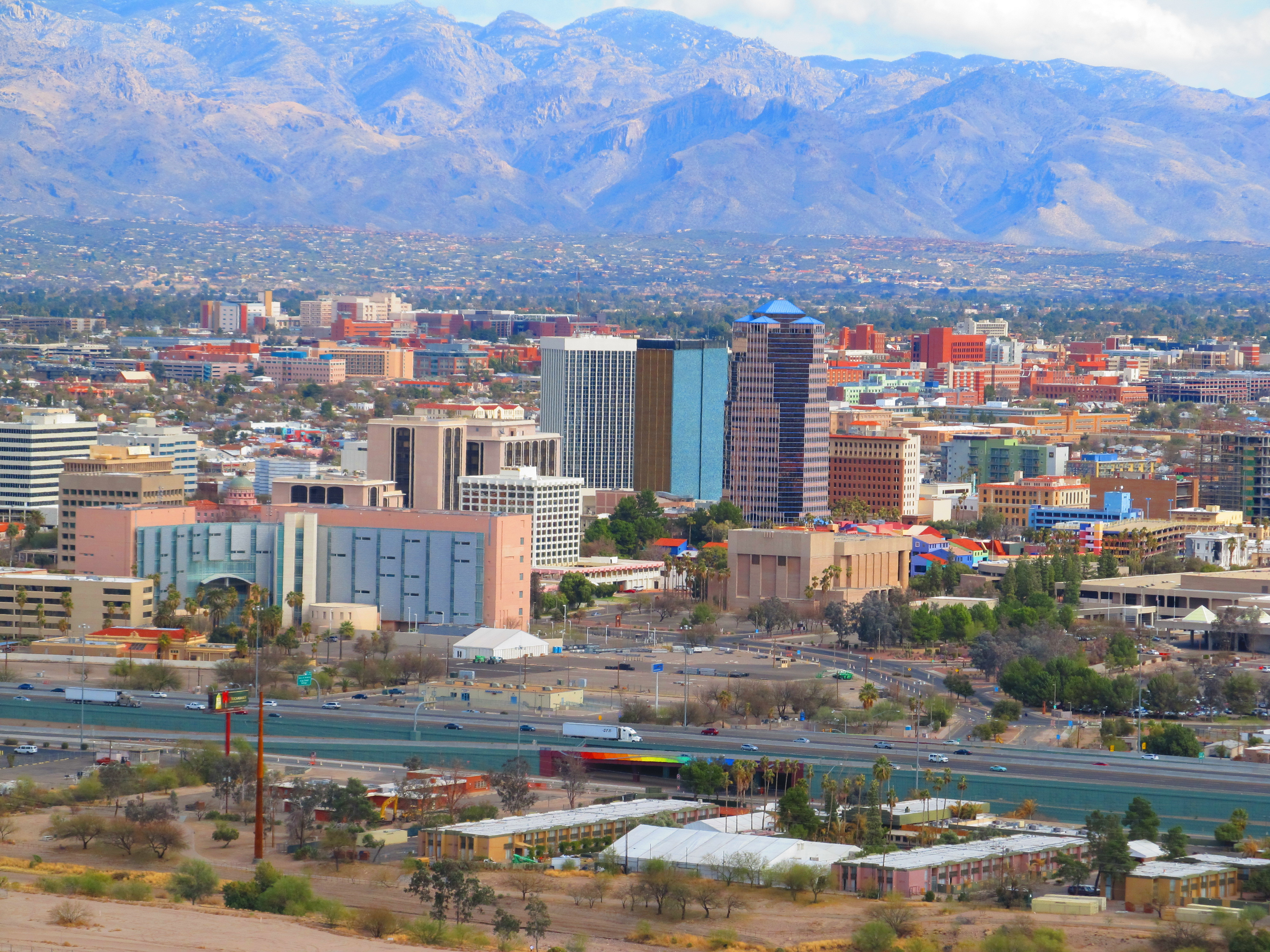
Tucson, Arizona skyline. Optics is considered the crown jewel of industry clusters in Tucson with research, innovation and companies spawned from nearby research centers.

In January 2019, Strategy1, a Tucson-based strategic planning and business consultancy, was awarded a Small Business Administration (SBA) contract to foster the growth of Arizona's optics industry. The contract's base year was 2019, with up to four additional option years. The Optics Valley Committee and its parent organization, AZTC, are strategic growth partners in the program. Other key program partners include Pima Community College, The University of Arizona Tech Launch Arizona, and Tech Parks Arizona. The SBA has renewed the contract each year.

== Economy ==
“Between 1996 and 2006, the state's optics industry went from generating $236 million and employing 2,300 people to generating $2.3 billion and employing 25,000, according to a 2008 report from the Office of Economic and Policy Analysis at the University of Arizona.”

The industry continues to be an economic powerhouse on a global scale and remains lucrative for business leaders in Arizona. Recent reports indicate, "Global annual revenue from the production of optics and photonics core components amounted to $282 billion in 2018, with nearly 4,300 manufacturing companies producing those core components across more than 50 countries.” “Production of photonics-enabled products generates more than four million jobs worldwide and revenues for those products exceeded $2 trillion in 2019.”

Thanks to the region's commitment to higher education promoting optical and photonic careers, Optics Valley is poised to benefit from the growing deep-space and space tourism industries. “Morgan Stanley estimates that by 2040, the global space industry could surge to over $1 trillion.”

Arizona features all the pieces needed to compete for new space investments, according to a 2018 Deloitte assessment. The firm compared Arizona with 13 other states with ties to the space industry across six focus areas including manufacturing, launch services area, validation and component testing, space situational awareness and mining. “Only Arizona boasts a presence in every category.”

== Academic Institutions ==
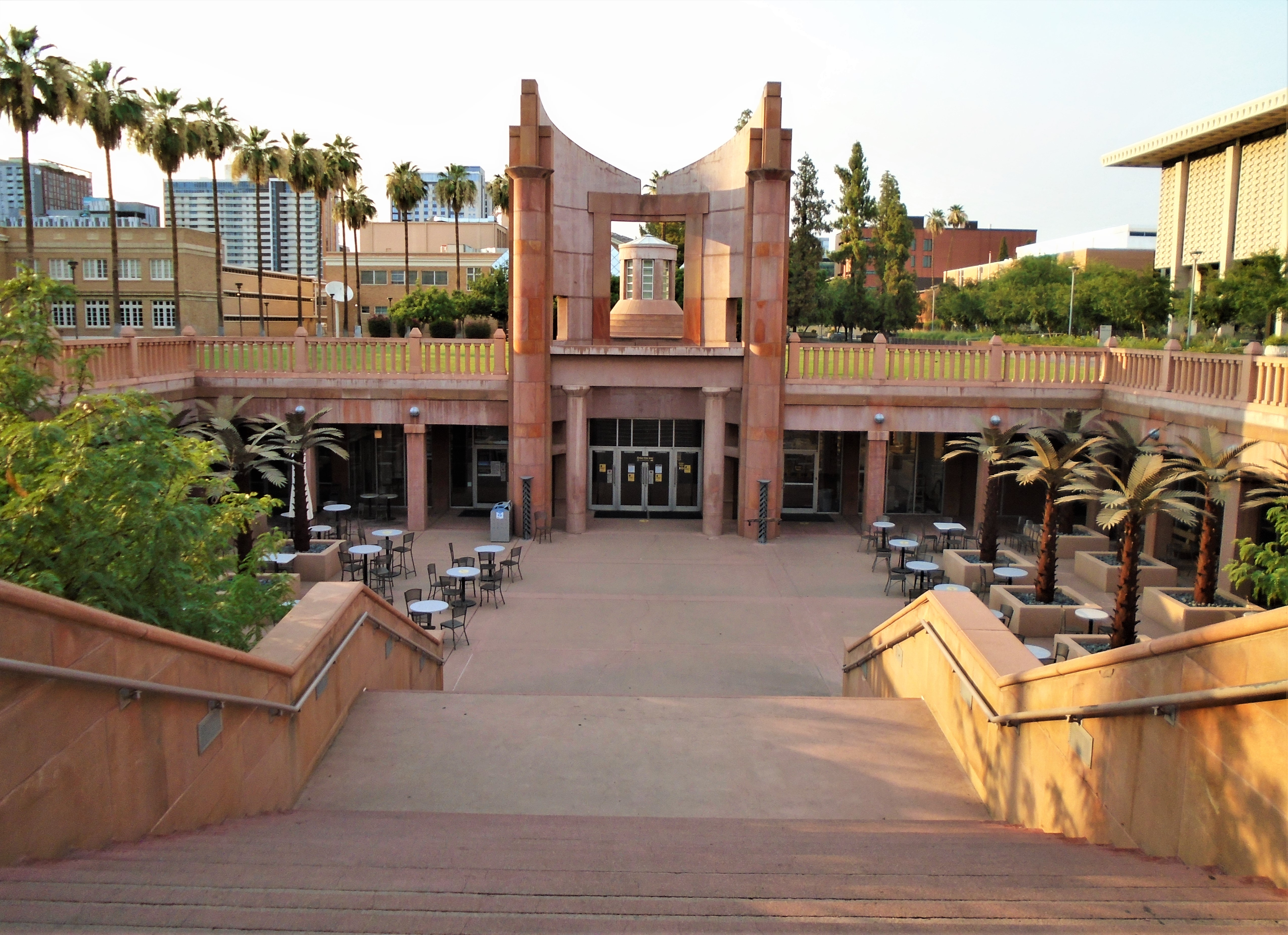
The Charles Trumbull Hayden Library, at 300 East Orange Mall on the Tempe campus of Arizona State University.

The region is home to various colleges and universities. Some of the best-known institutions are listed below.

- University of Arizona College of Optical Sciences
- Pima Community College
- Center for Photonics Innovation (CPhI), Arizona State University

== Research Centers and Astronomical Observatories ==
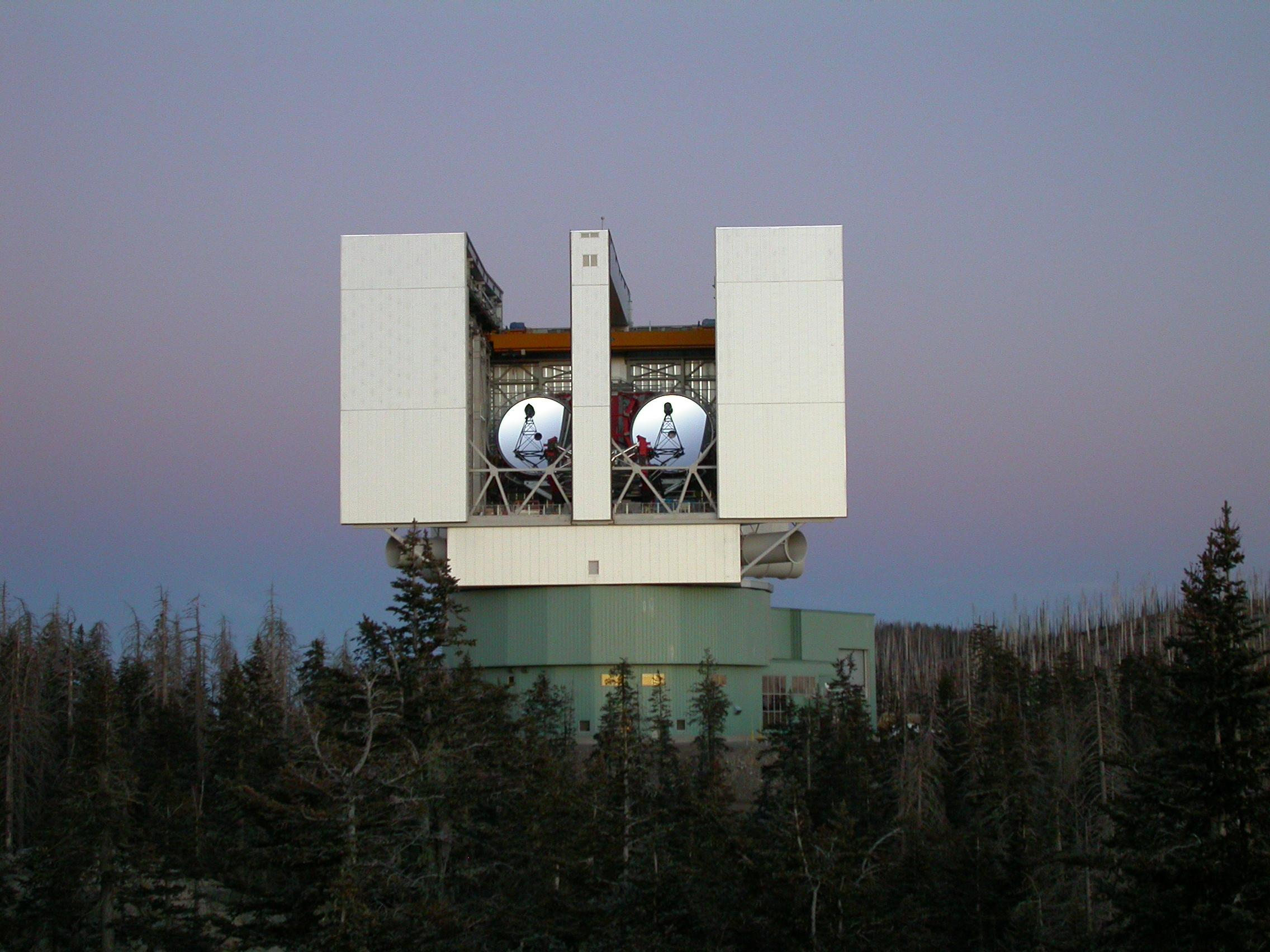
The Large Binocular Telescope on Mount Graham, east of Tucson

Arizona is home to many research centers and astronomical observatories. Below is a list of well-known examples.

- University of Arizona College of Optical Sciences
- Steward Observatory
- National Optical Astronomy Observatory
- Lunar and Planetary Laboratory
- Arizona Center for Mathematical Sciences
- Center for Integrated Access Networks (CIAN)
- Mount Graham International Observatory
- Kitt Peak National Observatory
- Fred Lawrence Whipple Observatory (Mount Hopkins)
- Mount Lemmon Observatory
- Catalina Station (Mount Bigelow)
