= Silicon shire =

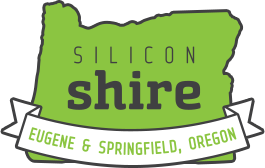
The logo of the Silicon Shire region.

In 2012 the Eugene, Oregon, metro area of the United States was dubbed the Silicon Shire. Like many regions that have taken on Silicon-themed names, the Silicon Shire is home to a thriving technology sector. In 2015, the region's rapid growth led to Eugene being named one of "The Next Top 10 Cities For Tech Jobs" by Fast Company magazine.

There are more than 400 companies in the Silicon Shire region, employing more than 4,570 people with an annual payroll of about $296 million. Key factors in the region's growth are the presence of higher education, a high quality of life, a low cost environment, and technological advancements. The region is home to the largest game developer cluster in Oregon, and also is the location of Symantec's third largest site in the world. In addition to technology, the region also boasts a significant healthcare sector as well as food processing, craft breweries, and small-scale agriculture. Regional companies have developed partnerships with local school districts to advance STEM education in the region.

In 2013, companies from the region organized an event at the University of Oregon which gave students and faculty a chance to mingle with representatives from local tech firms. In early 2015, companies from the region partnered with an international advocacy group for mobile app developers to host an event featuring speakers including Sen. Ron Wyden and Rep. Peter Defazio. Later that year, Alaska Airlines obtained a federal Small Community Air Service Development grant to establish a direct route connecting the region to Silicon Valley.

In 2016, the City of Eugene, the Eugene Water and Electric Board, and the Lane Council of Governments partnered to construct a municipally owned fiber network called EUGNet. The development of this network and the region's well established tech sector were key factors that led to Eugene being named a "Gigabit City" by the Mozilla Foundation in early 2017. Mozilla offered $150,000 in grants to regional organizations to fund a range of technology projects focused on making technology in the region more inclusive and engaging.

In early 2018, the Silicon Shire region was featured in an article in WIRED Magazine.

== See also ==
- Silicon Valley
- Silicon Alley
