= Technopolis Innovation Park Delft =

Coordinates: 51°59′21″N 4°23′8″E

The Technopolis Innovation Park Delft (or Technopolis) is a science park in Delft, Netherlands started in 2005.

Technopolis is next to the campus of Delft University of Technology. The park covers 70 hectares (170 acres) which is available for companies and institutes conducting research and development.

== See also ==
- Business cluster
