= Entertainment Corridor =

Portion of East Coast Road in Chennai, India

The Entertainment Corridor is a stretch along East Coast Road, Chennai in the Indian state of Tamil Nadu. It runs between Thiruvanmiyur and Mudaliarkuppam and is dotted with a number of theme parks, boat houses, beaches, 5-star hotels and pubs. The corridor is termed "Entertainment Corridor".

== Entertainment facilities ==
There are many boat houses including Muttukadu boat house and Mudaliarkuppam boat house. The corridor also has Multiplexes like Mayajaal Multiplex, Prarthana Drive-in theater. Theme Parks like VGP Universal Kingdom, MGM Dizzee World, etc. are also situated along this stretch.

Mamallapuram, a 7th-century port city is a tourist attraction in the corridor and is an UNESCO World Heritage Site. Pancha Rathas, Thirukadalmallai (a Lord Vishnu Temple), Descent of the Ganges (a giant open-air bas relief), Arjuna's Penance (a relief sculpture) are some of the attractions in the city. An underwater city named Seven Pagodas existed which had 7 shore temples out of which only one stands at the shore of Bay of Bengal at present.

Dakshina Chitra, a center for the living traditions of art, folk performing arts, craft and architecture of India with an emphasis on the traditions of South India is also along this corridor. It is a project of the Madras Craft Foundation (MCF), a non-profit organisation. DakshinaChitra opened to the public in December 1996. The center occupies ten undulating acres overlooking the Bay of Bengal.

Cholamandalam Artists' Village (an artist community),

Kart Attack (a Go-Karting racing track),

Madras Crocodile Bank (a reptile zoo and herpetology research station) are present along this corridor.

Muttukadu boat house - Located at 23 km from Adayar, this backwater area is maintained by the Tamil Nadu Tourism Development Corporation, and offers rowing, wind surfing, water skiing, and speedboat riding.

Covelong - Located at 26 km from Adayar, this bay is the site of a colonial Dutch Fort, and a fishing village with wind surfing opportunities.

Tiger cave - ancient place with large rocks located before five kilometres from Mamallapuram

Cholamandal Artists' Village - Founded in 1966, by K.C.S. Paniker, now an important art destination in the state.

== Facilities under construction ==
"Miniature Tamil Nadu" is a new village being developed in 50 acres (200,000 m^{2}) of land by Tamil Nadu Tourism Development corporation (TTDC Ltd) in this corridor. It is a concept to integrate Tamil culture, nativity, heritage and resort facilities under one roof.

"Underworld City" is a mega underwater aquarium being developed by TTDC adjacent to the VGP Universal Kingdom in the Golden Beach. The aquarium, set to be first of its kind in the country, would be spread across 3 acres (12,000 m^{2}), featuring five-metre-deep tunnels through which people can tour the aquarium that is likely to feature some 5,000 marine species from across the world. About 30 tanks will be established to hold the fish. Amphitheatre, food courts and a marine bio-technology research centre would be part of the aquarium.

== Beaches ==
A number of beaches is present along the entire stretch of the corridor making it another entertainment part of the corridor. Notable beaches are Thiruvanmiyur Beach, Covelong, Golden beach, Pebble Beach, Neelankarai Beach, Palavakkam Beach and Mamallapuram Beach.

== Adventure sports ==
A number of adventure water sports are promoted in the corridor. Para sailing, sailing, water skiing, water scooting, etc. are some of the adventure sports being promoted in Muttukadu and Mudaliarkuppam.
