= South Moravian Innovation Centre =

- JIC Startup Hub in Brno
- Founded: 2003; 23 years ago
- Headquarters: Brno, Czech Republic

JIC is a Czech innovation agency based in Brno. It supports the establishment and growth of technology and innovative companies and connects entrepreneurs, investors, universities, research institutions and public administration.

It focuses on people who are preparing to start their own company, on early-stage startups, as well as on companies that are already growing and expanding into international markets. In addition to working with individual companies, JIC also contributes to the development of the innovation environment in the Czech Republic and to connecting its various stakeholders.

JIC was established in 2003 on the initiative of the South Moravian Region, the Statutory City of Brno and Brno universities. It has the legal form of an association of legal entities and is based at the JIC Startup Hub in Medlánky, Brno.

== History ==
JIC was established in 2003 with the aim of supporting the creation of innovative companies and better connecting the academic environment with business. In its early years, JIC’s activities focused primarily on operating technology incubators and supporting early-stage technology companies.

Over time, JIC expanded its activities so that it could work with companies at different stages of their development – from the initial business idea through the creation of a startup to rapid growth and entry into international markets. More than 1,300 companies have received support from JIC since 2003. Companies that have used JIC support in the past include Kiwi.com, Y Soft and Flowmon.

In the following years, JIC also expanded its activities to include projects focused on the creative industries, game development, digital manufacturing and modern industrial technologies. In 2018, JIC began developing a network of Czech innovation centres that later operated under the Ynovate brand. The JICplus community was established in 2019, the KUMST creative hub in 2020, and the Gamebaze incubator in 2022.

== About JIC ==
JIC works with entrepreneurs and companies according to the stage of development they are in. Its main target groups include future company founders, early-stage startups and leaders of growing technology companies.

For people who are exploring the path to starting their own business, JIC offers education, consultations and support with validating business ideas. It also supports the creation of companies based on the results of academic research.

JIC provides early-stage startups with mentoring, business consulting, access to experts and investors, support with financing and facilities for further development. One of its programmes for technology startups is the JICbooster acceleration programme.

For growing companies, JIC’s support focuses on areas including strategic management, scaling, international expansion and financing. The JICplus community connects founders, managers and other key people from startups and scale-ups connected to JIC.

JIC also contributes to the development of the regional innovation ecosystem and cooperates with companies, universities, research organisations, investors and public institutions.

== Specialised centres and JIC brands ==
=== KUMST ===
KUMST is a creative hub in Brno that JIC opened in 2020. It focuses on supporting entrepreneurship in the creative industries and provides workspaces, education, consultations and community activities.

=== Gamebaze ===
Gamebaze was established in 2022 as an incubator for game developers and early-stage game studios. It provides education, consultations with industry experts, physical space and technical facilities.

=== JIC Smart Factory ===
JIC Smart Factory is a facility in Kuřim focused on advanced industrial manufacturing and the practical testing of technologies for manufacturing companies. Its activities include automation, robotics, digitalisation and industrial artificial intelligence. The facility builds on the activities of the former INTEMAC centre, which provided research and development infrastructure for manufacturing technologies.

=== FabLab ===
FabLab Brno is an open digital workshop focused on prototyping and digital manufacturing. It was established in 2017 and provides access to equipment including 3D printers, laser cutters, cutting plotters and CNC milling machines.

=== Velvet Innovation ===
Velvet Innovation is a platform initiated by JIC that connects people and organisations involved in the development of the innovation ecosystem. Its activities include Velvet Innovation Meetup events focused on sharing information, experience and opportunities for cooperation.

=== JIC Ventures ===
JIC’s investment activities are associated with the JIC Ventures brand. The first JIC Ventures investment vehicle was launched in 2015 to invest in promising technology companies connected with JIC’s ecosystem.

Companies in which JIC Ventures has invested include NenoVision.

In 2026, JIC launched a new JIC Ventures fund focused on pre-seed and seed-stage technology founders from Central and Eastern Europe. The fund plans to invest in approximately 20 startups.

The associated companies include JIC Ventures 2 a.s., which operates in the field of venture capital, and JIC General Partner s.r.o..

== Founding members ==
JIC operates as an association of legal entities. Its founding members are the South Moravian Region, the Statutory City of Brno, Masaryk University, Brno University of Technology, Mendel University in Brno and the University of Veterinary Sciences Brno.

== Headquarters ==
JIC is headquartered at the JIC Startup Hub in Medlánky, Brno, at Purkyňova 649/127.
