= Saint Monica University =

- Motto: Servire Sine Fine
- Motto in English: Service Without Limit
- Type: Private
- Established: 2012; 14 years ago
- Chancellor: Dr. Nicholas Asongu Jingwa, DEd.
- President: Prof. Januarius Jingwa Asongu, PhD, FABPP
- Provost: Prof. Ndeh N. Ningo, PhD.
- Location: PO Box 132, Buea, Cameroon, Cameroon and UK
- Campus: Traditional and Online
- Website: www.stmonicauniv.org

Saint Monica University or Saint Monica University: The American International University (SMU) is an accredited private independent Catholic university with operations in Cameroon. It is an American-style university offering career-focused programs that are at the intersection of liberal arts, science, and technology. It provides educational opportunities for the intellectual, social, entrepreneurial and professional development of a diverse student population.

The university offers Bachelor's, Master's and programs on-campus in Cameroon and online.

== Schools and institutes ==
The university operates four schools:

- School of Arts, Education & Humanities (SAEH)
- School of Business and Public Policy (SBPP)
- School of Science, Engineering and Technology (SSET)
- School of Health & Human Services (SHHS).

In addition, it has specialized institutes including the Institute for Ethics, Democracy, and Human Rights (IEDHR), which operates under the SAEH; the Institute for Sustainable Development & Entrepreneurship (ISDE), which operates under the SBPP; and the Institute of Biodiversity and Non-profit Studies (IBiNS), which operates under the SSET and in collaboration with the training and capacity building division of the Environment and Rural Development Foundation (ERUDEF).

== History ==
The roots of the university go back to 2001, when a group of American intellectuals originally from Cameroon decided to start a US-style university in Cameroon. In 2009, the Professional Training Center (PTC) went operational in Bamenda, Cameroon, approved by the Ministry of Employment and Vocational Training. It provided training in sustainable energy, especially solar energy. In 2012, Saint Monica University replaced the PTC, with the incorporation of the university in Hawaii in the United States as a non-profit institution offering Bachelor's, Master's, and Doctoral programs.

In the same year (2012), Saint Monica University began seeking authorization to operate in Cameroon and was granted permission, where it operates under the name, Saint Monica University (SMU) Higher Institute.

In a bid to expand into the United Kingdom, SMU established partnership with the Academy for International Science and Research (AISR) in Derry, Northern Ireland, which now serves as SMU's UK campus. Similarly, AISR now offers its programs in Cameroon at the SMU campus in Bulu, Buea.

The SMU ground or permanent campus in Cameroon is located in the Bulu neighborhood in Buea, the campus has been christened "Civitas Dei," Latin for "The City of God."

== Accreditation ==
Saint Monica University (SMU) is accredited by the United Kingdom-based Accreditation Service for International Colleges.

Saint Monica University is accredited in the National Commission on Private Higher Education at the Minister of Higher Education, Yaounde, Cameroon. SMU has, therefore, met all the requirements to function as a de facto institution of higher education in Cameroon.

== Partnerships and affiliations ==
Saint Monica University has partnerships, affiliations, and other agreements with Central State University in Wilberforce, OH, USA; Savannah State University in Savannah, GA, USA; University of Applied Sciences in Brandenburg, Germany; Astrakhan State Technical University in Astrakhan, Russia; Mahatma Gandhi University in Khanapara, India; Maharishi Markandeshwar University (MM University) in Mullana, India; and other universities in the US and other countries.

== Memberships ==
Saint Monica University is the only private university in Cameroon with membership of the UNESCO-based International Association of Universities (IAU) and is listed in the World Higher Education Database. It is also one of about 19 international members of the Council of Independent Colleges (CIC) and the only such university in Cameroon. CIC is an organization for small and mid-sized, independent, liberal arts colleges and universities in the U.S. It has about 700 universities as its members.

SMU is one of over a dozen African universities to join the Global Universities In Distance Education (GUIDE). The GUIDE Association was founded in 2005 by Marconi University to develop and support international cooperation and open and distance learning worldwide.

Saint Monica University is an education partner of the Association of Certified Fraud Examiners (ACFE), the world's largest anti-fraud organization and a provider of anti-fraud training and education.
