= Silicon Border =

Development site in Baja California, Mexico

Silicon Border Holding Company, LLC is a commercial 40-square-kilometre (9,900-acre) development site designed to produce semi-conductors for consumers in North America. The site is located in Mexicali, Baja California, along the southwestern border of the United States of America and Mexico. The site began manufacturing semiconductors between 2004-2005 with the intention of competing with the global market. Silicon Border provides Mexico with an infrastructure that enables high-tech companies anywhere in the world to relocate manufacturing operations to the country and exploit its competitive advantages such as geographical location, human capital, research, legal and tax benefits, intellectual property, international treaties, and logistics. This allows research to develop processes, design, fabrication and testing able to compete with Asian operations and costs. The infrastructure build-out, financed by ING Clarion, consists of potable water plant and distribution, fiber optic telephone and data cable, power substations, and waste treatment facilities. Silicon Border not only provides manufacturing space to companies creating "green" products, but does so in an environmentally conscious manner.

California's Governor Arnold Schwarzenegger promoted cooperation with the project and has encouraged economic partnerships with Silicon Border in his radio addresses. In 2006, the California governor created the "California/Baja Silicon Border Work Group," run by deputy secretary of the California Business, Transportation, and Housing Agency, Yolanda Benson. State officials promised to hasten the roadways needed to link up with those being built for Silicon Border in Mexico.

The area is supplied with water from the Colorado River and a major electrical sub-station supplied by three separate power plants. Infrastructure improvements associated with the proposed project include a new highway (under construction) and an additional border crossing. Silicon Border estimates that in ten years following the onset of development, the Silicon Border Science Park could generate 100,000 jobs both within Mexico and the U.S.

== See also ==
- Silicon Valley
- Silicon Wadi
