= Chennai ITIR =

Planned mega city in Tamil Nadu, India

The Chennai ITIR or "Information Technology Investment Region" is a planned mega city covering an area of about 1,600 km^{2} (395,368.61 acre). It will be a specifically notified zone that will include IT/BPOs, electronics hardware manufacturing units, public utilities, residential areas, social infrastructure and administrative units. The ITIR is bordered by IT corridor and NH4. The NH45 runs through the heart of the proposed city.

== Proposed infrastructure facilities ==
The cities of Chennai, Kanchipuram and Mamallapuram will be connected with roadways and railways as a part of the project.

=== Proposed road connectivity ===
- Extension of NH4 from Chennai to Mamallapuram.
- A single road connecting Mahabalipuram, Tirukazhukundram, Chengalpattu and Kanchipuram would be established.

=== Proposed rail connectivity ===
- Extension of MRTS from Chennai till Mamallapuram. [50 km]
- A new railway line from Anna Nagar to Sriperumbudur. [75 km]

=== Proposed air connectivity ===
- A new international airport at Sriperumbudur at a cost of INR 3000 crores.

=== New townships ===
Three new townships are proposed in the following areas.

- Two townships in areas flanked by NH4 and GST Road.
- One township in area flanked by GST Road and IT corridor.
