= Silicon Gorge =

Region in South West England

Silicon Gorge is a region in South West England in which several high-tech and research companies are based, specifically the triangle of Bristol, Swindon and Gloucester. It was ranked fifth of such areas in Europe in 2002, and is named after the Avon Gorge.

== Cities ==
=== Gloucester ===
Gloucester is home to a number of cyber/digital companies including some key UK data centres and hosting companies. Lots of these companies started in the early years of the Internet such as Star Internet, now Claranet and Fasthosts, now IONOS - two long standing employers in the area. Supporting Gloucester and the south-west infrastructure is a data centre that sits on the figure-of-eight fibre connectivity route that runs around the UK, Indectron Data Centre where many carriers have points-of-presence (POP). This includes Tier 1 network, which puts Gloucester alongside Manchester and London on the connectivity rankings.

The area is fast becoming known for cyber security with the Government Communication Headquarters (GCHQ) locally in Cheltenham (since 1950). New cyber accelerators such as CyNam have been growing, with a new £1 billion cyber park called Golden Valley pushing growth even further of the sector within the region.

=== Bath ===
Bath is home to a number of high-tech companies ranging from fabless semiconductor designers to eCommerce retailers. Many companies have been started by ex-employees of companies such as Future Publishing and IPL, two long standing employers in the area.

==== Microelectronic companies in Bath ====
- PicoChip

==== Ventures ====
- Lovehoney uk sex-toy retailer.
- The Filter media recommendation service.
- Netcraft Internet Research and Security

=== Bristol ===
Bristol is part of the Silicon Gorge, along with Gloucester and Swindon and hosts a number of high-tech and creative industries including research group HP Labs and animation studio Aardman Animations. The cluster of high-tech electronics industries began when Fairchild Semiconductor located a design office in Bristol in 1972. Bristol also has the strongest digital media supply chain in England, outside London and has been pinpointed as a "hot spring" for innovation on the McKinsey/World Economic Forum innovation map.

==== Microelectronics companies in Bristol ====
- Blu Wireless
- Broadcom
- Cray Supercomputers
- Codasip
- Graphcore AI accelerators
- HP Labs
- Imagination Technologies
- Infineon
- Nordic Semiconductor
- Sondrel
- Qualcomm
- UltraSoC
- XMOS

==== Tech companies in Bristol ====
- Blackmagic Design
- Just Eat
- Open Bionics
- Zap Map
- Silicon Gorge Apps

==== Business incubators ====
- Bristol Robotics Laboratory Hardware Incubator
- SETsquared
- Spike Design

==== Support organisations ====
- Media Sandbox by Watershed Media Centre

==== Networks ====
- Bristol Media

==== Ventures ====
- Aardman Animations
- Dyson
- Gresham Technologies plc
- IMDb
- Renishaw plc
- Viral Ad Network

== Other cities ==
- Swindon

Cities sometimes associated with the region:

- Exeter
- Southampton
- Plymouth

== Academic Institutions ==
- University of Bristol
- University of the West of England
- University of Bath
- University of Exeter
- Bath Spa University

== See also ==
- Silicon Fen
- Silicon Glen
- Silicon Valley
- M4 Corridor
