= Canada's Technology Triangle =

- Abbreviation: CTT
- Type: Not-for-profit
- Headquarters: Waterloo, Ontario, Canada
- CEO: John G. Jung
- Staff: 8
- Website: www.techtriangle.com

Canada's Technology Triangle (CTT) was a promotional organization that represented Waterloo Region, which includes the cities of Cambridge, Kitchener and Waterloo and the townships of North Dumfries, Wellesley, Wilmot and Woolwich. The organization shut its doors on December 31, 2015. Investment promotion efforts are now the responsibility of Waterloo EDC. The origins of the name Canada's Technology Triangle date back to 1987, when the organization also represented the City of Guelph (the third vertex of the geographical 'triangle' with Kitchener-Waterloo and Cambridge). The term "CTT" marked its 20th anniversary in 2007.

A book about the region titled "Canada's Technology Triangle An Economic Celebration" was published in 1999.

CTT Inc is the regional economic development organization responsible for marketing Waterloo Region to the world. It assists companies and individuals considering to locate or do business in the area by providing the economic data and information needed to make a business case and by facilitating introductions to the government and business community. It was named one of the top economic development organizations in Canada.

In early 2009, the organization embarked on a strategic planning process under the direction of the new CEO, John Jung, to refine its mandate. There are now eight staff members at CTT Inc working to build a stronger international presence for Waterloo Region.

== See also ==
- Silicon Valley
