= Johor Technology Park =

Industrial park in Kulai, Johor, Malaysia

Coordinates: 1°34′41.1″N 103°38′56.4″E

Johor Technology Park (Malay: Taman Teknologi Johor) is an industrial park located in Kulai District, Johor, Malaysia.
