= List of research parks =

The following is a list of science park, technology parks and biomedical parks of the world, organized by continent.

== Asia ==
=== China ===
==== Mainland China ====
- Shanghai Pudong Software Park (Shanghai)
- Zhangjiang Hi-Tech Park (aka Zhangjiang Drug Valley) (Shanghai)
- Shenzhen Hi-Tech Industrial Park (Shenzhen)
- Suzhou BioBay (Suzhou)
- Suzhou Industrial Park (Suzhou)
- Zhongguancun (aka Beijing Zhong-guan-cun Life Science Park) (Beijing)

==== Hong Kong ====
- Cyberport
- Hong Kong Science Park

=== India ===
- Genome Valley
  - Alexandria Knowledge Park
  - Alexandria Center for Science and Innovation
  - IKP Knowledge Park
- Rajiv Gandhi Infotech Park
- IITB Aspire, Mumbai
- Life Science Hub, Mumbai
- IIT Madras Research Park
- IIT Bhubaneswar Research & Entrepreneurship Park
- National Institute for Interdisciplinary Science and Technology, Trivandrum
- Vikram Sarabhai Space Centre, Trivandrum*
- Indian Institute of Space Science and Technology, Trivandrum
- National Centre for Earth Science Studies, Trivandrum
- Indian Institutes of Science Education and Research, Trivandrum
- Institute of Advanced Virology, Kerala, Trivandrum
- KIIT Technology Business Incubator
- Electropreneur Park Bhubaneswar
- O Hub
- Bhubaneswar City Knowledge Innovation Cluster
- CSRI-IMMT InTEC & CRTDH
- IIT Hyderabad Research Park and Incubation Park ( Both are different areas )

=== Indonesia ===
- Bandung Techno Park
- Cimahi Techno Park
- Solo Techno Park

=== Iran ===
- Isfahan Science and Technology Town
- Qazvin Science & Technology Park
- Pardis Technology Park
- Kurdistan Science and Technology Town
- Pardis Technology Park
- Science & Technology Park-IASBS
- Khorasan Science and Technology Park
- Sheikh Bahai Technology Park
- Guilan Science and Technology Park
- Semnan Science and Technology Park - SSTP
- East Azarbaijan Science and Technology Park
- Yazd Province Technology Park
- Markazi Province Technology Park
- Fars Province Technology Park

=== Israel ===
- Silicon Wadi
- Startup Village - Yokneam
- Matam - Haifa
- Jerusalem Technology Park
- Har Hotzvim, Jerusalem
- Weizmann Institute of Science, Rehovot
- Tamar Science Park (Rehovot)

=== Japan ===
- Kansai Science City
- Kyoto Research Park (KRP)
- Tokyo Bay Biotech cluster
- Tsukuba Science City
- Yokosuka Research Park

=== Malaysia ===
- Cyberjaya (near Kuala Lumpur)
- Technology Park Malaysia (Kuala Lumpur)
- UTM Technovation Park (University of Technology Malaysia, Johor)
- Sciences & Arts Innovation Space - SAINS@USM (Universiti Sains Malaysia, Penang)

=== Pakistan ===
- National Science and Technology Park (NSTP) - Islamabad
- Kahuta Research Laboratories, (Military research complex, Kahuta)
- National Institute for Biotechnology and Genetic Engineering, Faisalabad
- Arfa Karim Technology Park (former Software Technology Park) - Lahore
- IT Media City - Karachi
- Silicon Village- Islamabad

=== Philippines ===
- Light Industry and Science Park of the Philippines II, Laguna
- Science City of Muñoz, Nueva Ecija
- Calamba Premiere International Park

=== Qatar ===
- Qatar Science & Technology Park (Doha)

=== Saudi Arabia ===
- KAUST Research Park
- King Abdullah Science Park at KFUPM
- Wadi Makkah
- Riyadh Techno Valley

=== Singapore ===
- Biopolis
- Singapore Science Park (Singapore)

=== South Korea ===
- Daedeok Science Town
- Digital Media City
- Gumi Research Park
- Pohang Research Centre
- Changwon Industrial Park
- Ulsan Industrial Park

=== Taiwan ===
- Hsinchu Science Park (Hsinchu City)
- Central Taiwan Science Park (Taichung City)
- Southern Taiwan Science Park (Tainan City)
- Tainan Science Park (Tainan City)

=== Thailand ===
- Thailand Science Park (north of Bangkok)
- Prince of Songkla University Science Park
- Chiangmai University Science Park
- Khonkean University Science Park

=== Turkey ===
- Hacettepe Teknokent (Hacettepe TECHNOPOLIS) (Ankara)
- Yildiz Teknopark (Istanbul)
- METU Technopolis (METUTECH) (Ankara)
- İYTE Teknopark (İzmir)
- İ.T.Ü. ARI Teknokent Technology Development Zone (Istanbul)
- Teknopark Istanbul (Istanbul)

=== Vietnam ===
- Hoa Lac High-Tech Park, Hanoi
- Saigon Hi-Tech Park, Ho Chi Minh City
- Da Nang Hi-Tech Park, Da Nang

== Europe ==
=== Belarus ===
- Belarus High Technologies Park (Minsk)
- China-Belarus Industrial Park (Minsk)

=== Belgium ===
- Louvain-la-Neuve Science Park
- Arenberg Research-Park
- Aéropole Science Park
- Crealys Science Park
- Al Camino Research Park
- Zwijnaarde science park

=== Bulgaria ===
- Sofia Tech Park

=== Czech Republic ===
- Czech Technology Park (Brno)
- Palacký University Scientific-Technical Park (Olomouc)
- Vědeckotechnický park (Plzeň)
- VZLU Aerospace (Prague)

=== Denmark ===
- INCUBA Science Park (Aarhus)
- Scion DTU (Hørsholm near Copenhagen)

=== Estonia ===
- Tartu Science Park
- Tallinn Science Park Tehnopol
- PAKRI Science and Industrial Park – Synergy for greentech companies; unique physical environment and testing with PAKRI Smart Industrial City and its own PAKRI Smart Grid 75 MW renewable power network, which combined enables total control of energy prices.

=== Finland ===
- Hermia (Tampere)
- Otaniemi Science Park - the largest technology hub in the Nordic countries
- Turku Science Park
- Technology Centre Teknia & Kuopio Science Park (Kuopio)
- Technopolis Group - one of the largest technology center operators in Europe

=== France ===
- Paris-Saclay
- Eurasante Bio-business Park (Lille)
- Sophia Antipolis (Nice)
- Villeneuve d'Ascq
- Polygone Scientifique (Grenoble)
- Inovallée (Meylan)
- Rennes Atalante

=== Germany ===
- Wissenschaftspark Leipzig, Leipzig
- WISTA (Science and Technology Park in Berlin-Adlershof)
- Bayer CoLaborator (Berlin)
- Biotechnologiepark Luckenwalde GmbH (Luckenwalde, Brandenburg)
- Expo Park Hannover (Hannover)
- Softwarezentrum Böblingen/Sindelfingen - biggest research park focussing on information technology in Europe (Böblingen near Stuttgart)
- Technologiepark Dortmund (Dortmund)
- Technologiepark Paderborn (Paderborn)
- Technologie- und Gewerbezentrum Schwerin/Wismar (Schwerin and Wismar)
- Technologiezentrum Vorpommern (Greifswald and Stralsund)
- Technologiezentrum Warnemünde (Rostock-Warnemünde)
- Innovation Campus Lemgo
- Transferzentrum für angepasste Technologien (Rheine)
- Triple Z Essen - Gründungs- und Unternehmenszentrum ZukunftsZentrumZollverein (Essen)
- Weinberg Campus (Halle (Saale))

=== Hungary ===
- Infopark (Budapest)

=== Italy ===
- Kilometro Rosso in (Bergamo, Lombardy, Northern Italy)
- AREA Science Park (Trieste near the Slovenian border)
- Bioindustry Park Silvano Fumero (Canavese near Turin in the north of Italy)
- Erzelli High-Tech Park (Genova near Genoa Airport in the north-west of Italy, on the Mediterranean Sea)
- Milan Innovation District (in northwest Milan)
- VEGA (Venezia)

=== Netherlands ===
- Science Park Amsterdam (Amsterdam)
- Utrecht Science Park (Utrecht)
- Leiden Bio Science Park (Leiden)
- Technopolis Delft (Delft)
- HighTech Campus Eindhoven (Eindhoven)
- Science Park Maastricht (Maastricht)
- Pivot Park (Oss)

=== Poland ===
- Jagiellonian Center of Innovation (Kraków)
- Bionanopark (Łódź)
- Lower Silesian Technology Park T-Park (Dolnośląski Park Technologiczny "T-Park")
- Pomeranian Science and Technology Park (Gdynia)
- Poznański Park Naukowo-Technologiczny - Poznan Science and Technology Park (Poznań)
- Startup Hub Poland (Warsaw)
- Szczeciński Park Naukowo-Technologiczny (Szczecin)
- Wrocławski Park Technologiczny, (Wrocław)
- Bialystok Science and Technology Park

=== Portugal ===
- Avepark (Caldas das Taipas)
- Biocantpark (Cantanhede)
- Brigantia Eco Park (Bragança)
- Coimbra iParque
- Feirapark (Porto)
- Gaia Park (Vila Nova de Gaia)
- iParque (Coimbra)
- Instituto Pedro Nunes (Coimbra)
- Lispólis (Lisbon)
- Madan Parque de Ciência (Caparica)
- Madeira Tecnopólo (Funchal)
- Óbidos Terra Digital (Óbidos)
- Parque de Ciência e Tecnologia da Universidade do Porto (Porto)
- Parque Tecnológico da Mutela (Almada)
- Polo Tecnológico do Algarve (Faro)
- Portuspark (Porto)
- Parkurbis (Covilhã)
- Régia-Douro Park (Vila Real)
- Sanjotec (São João da Madeira)
- Tecmaia (Maia)
- Tagos Valley (Abrantes)
- Taguspark (Oeiras)

=== Russia ===
==== Research parks ====
- SPbU Research Park (Saint Petersburg)

==== Technological parks ====
- High Technology park IT Park
- Dubna Technopark
- Khanty-Mansiisk Technopark
- Novosibirsk Technopark
- Sarov Technopark
- IDEA Innovative Technopark in Tatarstan

==== Special economic zones of technical innovation type ====
- Dubna SEZ of Technical Innovation Type
- Saint Petersburg SEZ of Technical Innovation Type
- Tomsk SEZ of Technical Innovation Type
- Zelenograd SEZ of Technical Innovation Type

==== Innovation centers ====
- Skolkovo Innovation Center

=== Slovakia ===
- Vedecko-technologicky park Žilina (Žilina)
- Comenius University Science Park (Bratislava)

=== Spain ===
- Parque Tecnológico de Vizcaya (Bilbao)
- Parc de Recerca UAB (Barcelona)
- Barcelona Science Park (Barcelona)
- Barcelona Biomedical Research Park (Barcelona)
- Parc Tecnològic del Vallès (Barcelona)
- Tecnológico de Boecillo (Valladolid)
- Parque Tecnológico de Andalucía (Málaga)
- Cartuja93 (Seville)
- Parque Tecnológico de León (León)
- Parc Científic i Tecnològic Universitat de Girona (Girona)
- Parque Tecnológico TechnoPark MotorLand (Alcañiz)
- PCiTAL Parc Cientific i Tecnològic de Lleida "Parc Cientific i Tecnologic Agroalimentari de Lleida" (in Spanish). (Lleida)
- Parc Científic de la Universitat de València (Valencia)

=== Sweden ===
- Ideon Science Park (Lund)
- Kista Science City (Stockholm)
- Lindholmen Science Park (Gothenburg)
- Luleå Science Park
- Mjärdevi Science Park (Linköping)

=== Turkey ===
- Hacettepe Teknokent (Hacettepe TECHNOPOLIS) (Ankara)
- Yildiz Teknopark (Istanbul)
- METU Technopolis (METUTECH) (Ankara)
- İYTE Teknopark (İzmir)
- İ.T.Ü. ARI Teknokent Technology Development Zone (Istanbul)
- Teknopark Istanbul (Istanbul)

=== United Kingdom ===
- Milton Park (Oxfordshire)
- MSP - Manchester Science Partnerships (Manchester & Alderley Park, Cheshire)
- Adastral Park, (Ipswich)
- Bath and Bristol Science Park
- Cambridge Science Park (Cambridge)
- Norwich Research Park (NRP) (Colney, South Norfolk)
- Peel Park (East Kilbride)
- Surrey Research Park
- Wavertree Technology Park (near Liverpool)
- University of Warwick Science Park (Coventry)
- The Surrey Research Park (University of Surrey, Guildford)
- Colworth Science Park
- Harwell Science and Innovation Campus
- Heriot Watt University Research Park (Heriot Watt University), (Edinburgh)

== North America ==
There are approximately 170 university research parks in North America today.

=== Canada ===
Alberta

- Edmonton Research Park
- UCalgary University Research Park

==== British Columbia ====
- BC Research BC Research Technology Innovation and Commercialization Centre
- Simon Fraser University Burnaby Mountain Science Park
- University of British Columbia

==== Ontario ====
- Blueline Bioscience (Toronto)
- David Johnston Research + Technology Park (Waterloo, Ontario)
- MaRS Discovery District (aka MaRS Center) (Toronto)
- University of Western Ontario Research Parks (London, Ontario)
- Kanata Research Park (Ottawa)
- McMaster Innovation Park (Hamilton, Ontario)
- Cleantech Commons (Trent University, Peterborough) https://cleantechcommons.ca/

==== Saskatchewan ====
- Innovation Place Research Park (2 parks: Regina & Saskatoon)

=== Mexico ===
==== Nuevo León ====
- Parque de Investigación e Innovación Tecnológica, PIIT (Monterrey)

=== United States ===
==== Alabama ====
- Cummings Research Park (Huntsville)
- UAB Oxmoor
- Tuskegee University Research Park (Tuskegee)

==== Arizona ====
- Arizona State University Research Park
- Tech Parks Arizona

==== California ====
- California Institute for Biomedical Research
- California Institute for Quantitative Biosciences
- Bayer CoLaborator (San Francisco)
- Innovation Village Research Park at Cal Poly Pomona
- Stanford Research Park
- UCSC Monterey Bay Education, Science & Technology Center (UC MBEST)

==== Connecticut ====
- Science Park at Yale (New Haven, CT)

==== Florida ====
- Central Florida Research Park (Orlando)
- Miami Civic Center (Miami)
- Research Park at Florida Atlantic University (Boca Raton and Deerfield Beach)
- Florida Gulf Coast University Innovation Hub (Fort Myers)
- Innovation Park (Tallahassee)
- Medical City at Lake Nona, (Orlando)
- Progress Corporate Park (Gainesville)
- Sid Martin Biotechnology Incubator (Alachua)
- Treasure Coast Research Park (Fort Pierce)
- USF Research Park (Tampa)
- Florida Network of Research, Science and Technology Parks
- Foundation Park (Alachua)

==== Georgia ====
- Rowen (Atlanta Metro Region)
- Georgia Tech Research Institute (Atlanta)

==== Illinois ====
- The Illinois Science & Technology Park (Skokie, IL)
- University Technology Park at IIT (Chicago, IL)
- Research Park at the University of Illinois Urbana-Champaign (Champaign, IL)
- Illinois Technology and Research Corridor
- Southern Illinois University Research Park (Carbondale, IL)

==== Indiana ====
- Purdue Research Park (West Lafayette)
- 16 Tech Innovation District (Indianapolis, Indiana)

==== Iowa ====
- BioVentures Center (University of Iowa)
- Iowa State University Research Park

==== Kansas ====
- KU Innovation Park
- Wichita State University Innovation Campus

==== Kentucky ====
- University of Kentucky Coldstream Research Campus

==== Louisiana ====
- LSU Innovation Park (Baton Rouge, Louisiana)
- National Cyber Research Park (Bossier City, Louisiana)
- University of New Orleans Research and Technology Park

==== Maryland ====
- University of Maryland Research Park (Discovery District) (College Park, MD)
- Science & Technology Park at Johns Hopkins (Baltimore, MD)
- University of Maryland BioPark (Baltimore, MD)
- Johns Hopkins University Montgomery County Campus (Rockville, MD)
- bwtech@UMBC Research and Technology Park (Baltimore, MD)

==== Massachusetts ====
- BioSquare at Boston University (Boston, MA)
- LabCentral (Cambridge)
- University Park at MIT - Cambridge, MA

==== Michigan ====
- TechTown at Wayne State University - Detroit, MI
- University Corporate Research Park at Michigan State University - Lansing, MI

==== Minnesota ====
- Minnesota Innovation Park (Formerly Minnesota Innovation Center) In Planning Stages - Minneapolis, MN

==== Mississippi ====
- The MS e-Center at Jackson State University - Jackson, MS

==== Montana ====
- Montana State University Innovation Campus - Bozeman, MT

==== Nebraska ====
- Nebraska Technology Park - Lincoln, NE
- Nebraska Innovation Campus - Lincoln, NE

==== New York ====
- Rensselaer Technology Park at RPI
- Metrotech Center at New York University Tandon School of Engineering

==== North Carolina ====
- Research Triangle Park (Raleigh-Durham)
- University Research Park (University City - Charlotte)
- North Carolina Research Campus (Kannapolis)
- NC State University Centennial Campus (Raleigh)
- Gateway University Research Park (Greensboro, North Carolina)
- Innovation Quarter (downtown Winston-Salem)
- Intersect East (East Carolina University - Greenville, North Carolina)

==== North Dakota ====
- North Dakota State University Research Technology Park (Fargo)

==== Ohio ====
- Miami Valley Research Park, Kettering - in the Greater Dayton area
- Mound Advanced Technology Center Miamisburg, OH
- Russ Research Center, Beavercreek, Ohio - in the Greater Dayton area
- Science & Technology Campus Corporation, Columbus, Ohio

==== Oregon ====
- Riverfront Research Park, University of Oregon

==== Pennsylvania ====
- University of Pittsburgh Applied Research Center (U-PARC), Harmarville
- Pittsburgh Technology Center, Pittsburgh
- Bettis Atomic Power Laboratory, West Mifflin
- University City Science Center, Philadelphia
- Innovation Park, State College, Pennsylvania
- Spring House Innovation Park, Spring House, Pennsylvania in Lower Gwynedd

==== South Carolina ====
- Clemson ICAR International Center for Automobile Research, Greenville, South Carolina
- Clemson University Innovation Campus and Technology Park (CUICAT), Anderson, South Carolina
- The University of South Carolina's Innovista next to The Vista District in downtown, Columbia, South Carolina.
- Carolina Research Park, Columbia, SC.

==== South Dakota ====
- South Dakota State University Innovation Campus Research Science Technology Park (Brookings)

==== Texas ====
- Baylor Research and Innovation Collaborative (Waco)
- Research Forest (The Woodlands)
- Rice University-The Ion (Houston)
- Southwest Research Institute (San Antonio)
- Texas A&M University Research Park (College Station)
- Texas Research Park (San Antonio)
- University of Houston Technology Bridge (Houston)
- University of North Texas Research Park (Denton)
- Texas State University Science, Technology, and Advanced Research Park (San Marcos)

==== Utah ====
- University of Utah Research Park (Salt Lake City, Utah)
- Vivint Innovation Center (Lehi, Utah)

==== Virginia ====
- Fontaine Research Park (Charlottesville)
- University of Virginia Research Park (Charlottesville)
- Virginia Tech Corporate Research Center (Blacksburg)
- Virginia BioTechnology Research Park (Richmond)
- Innovation Technology Park @Prince William (Prince William County)
- Wallops Research Park (Wallops Island)

==== West Virginia ====
- West Virginia Regional Technology Park (South Charleston)

==== Wisconsin ====
- Milwaukee County Research Park (Wauwatosa, Wisconsin)
- University Research Park at University of Wisconsin–Madison
- Innovation Campus at University of Wisconsin-Milwaukee (Wauwatosa, Wisconsin)

== South America ==
=== Argentina ===
- Parque Industrial Agropecuario y Tecnológico Ciudad de Famaillá Tucumán
- Mendoza TIC Parque Tecnológico
- Parque Biotecnológico y Energías Renovables de la Universidad Nacional de Cuyo
- Parque Tecno-Industrial Albardón
- Parque Tecnológico Industrial y Playa de Transferencia de Cargas
- Parque Industrial y Tecnológico de Villa María
- Parque Industrial y Tecnológico Las Varillas
- Parque Industrial y Tecnológico de Villa Dolores
- Parque Tecnológico del Litoral Centro S.A.P.E.M.
- Parque Industrial Tecnológico Aeronáutico Morón

=== Brazil ===
- (anchor) Biominas Foundation (Belo Horizonte)
- (anchor) Butantan Institute (São Paulo)
- (anchor) Oswaldo Cruz Foundation (Rio de Janeiro)

=== Colombia ===
- Parque Tecnológico Guatiguará

=== Chile ===
- Parque Científico y Tecnológico Laguna Carén, University of Chile, (Pudahuel, Santiago)
- Parque Científico y Tecnológico Pacyt Bío Bío, University of Concepción, (Concepción)
- Centro Antártico Internacional, Instituto Antártico Chileno, (Punta Arenas)
- Centro Interdisciplinario de Neurociencia de Valparaíso (Valparaíso)

=== Panama ===
- International Technopark of Panama at the City of Knowledge

== Oceania ==
=== Australia ===
- Australian Technology Park (Sydney)
- Technology Park Adelaide (Mawson Lakes, South Australia)
- Macquarie Park, Sydney, NSW (including the Research Park - Macquarie University)
- Canberra Technology Park (Canberra)
- Technology Park (Bentley, Western Australia)
- Silicon Mallee Adelaide, South Australia
- Innovation Campus

Silicon Mallee Adelaide, South Australia

=== New Zealand ===
- Innovation Waikato (Hamilton)
- NZ Central Technology Park (Wellington)

== See also ==
- List of technology centers
- Research-intensive clusters
