= Research Park at Florida Atlantic University =

Research park in Boca Raton, Florida

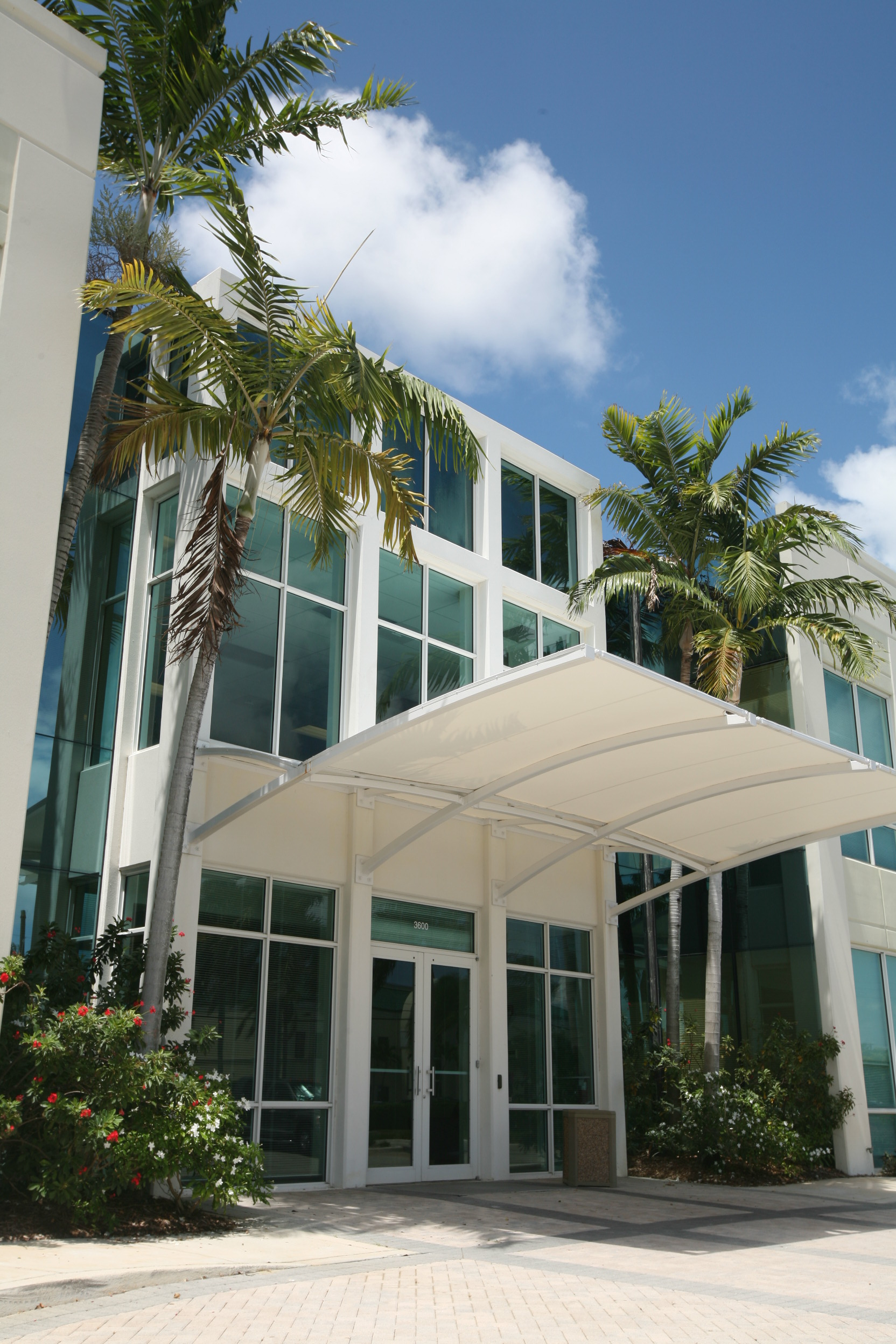
Research Park at FAU facilities

Research Park at Florida Atlantic University is a 70-acre university research park located at the northern end of the Florida Atlantic University campus in Boca Raton, Florida. The Research Park at FAU is home to technology companies and research-based organizations working to support the research and development activities of Florida Atlantic University and to foster economic development and broaden the economic base of Broward and Palm Beach counties.

Established in 1985, it is a separate organization from FAU. Research Park at FAU is governed by the Florida Atlantic Research and Development Authority, an independent special district created by Palm Beach and Broward counties in partnership with Florida Atlantic University.

== Key tenants and Global Ventures initiative ==
Several research and innovation-focused companies are based in the Research Park at FAU, including 4ocean, Aerospace Technologies Group, American Sugar Refining, Dioxide Materials, Diowave, GenesisCare, Material Bank, MPLT Healthcare, SANDOW, and Xeriant.

In addition, the Research Park at FAU hosts Global Ventures, an International Business Innovation Association (InBIA) designated international soft-landing center for second-stage technology companies to scale up, commercialize new technologies and become sustainable companies, employing graduates of Florida Atlantic University and South Florida residents. Global Ventures at FAU seeks to assist technology-based companies with an interest in developing links to FAU that have achieved approximately $1 million in annual sales and employ at least six (6) people, as well as graduates of FAU Tech Runway. With private suites ranging from 9 m2 – 185 m2 (100 sq. ft. – 2,000 sq. ft.), shared conference rooms, central mail facilities, and common areas, Global Ventures at FAU offers flexible terms on office and lab space, with the ability to grow and contract quickly as the need arises.

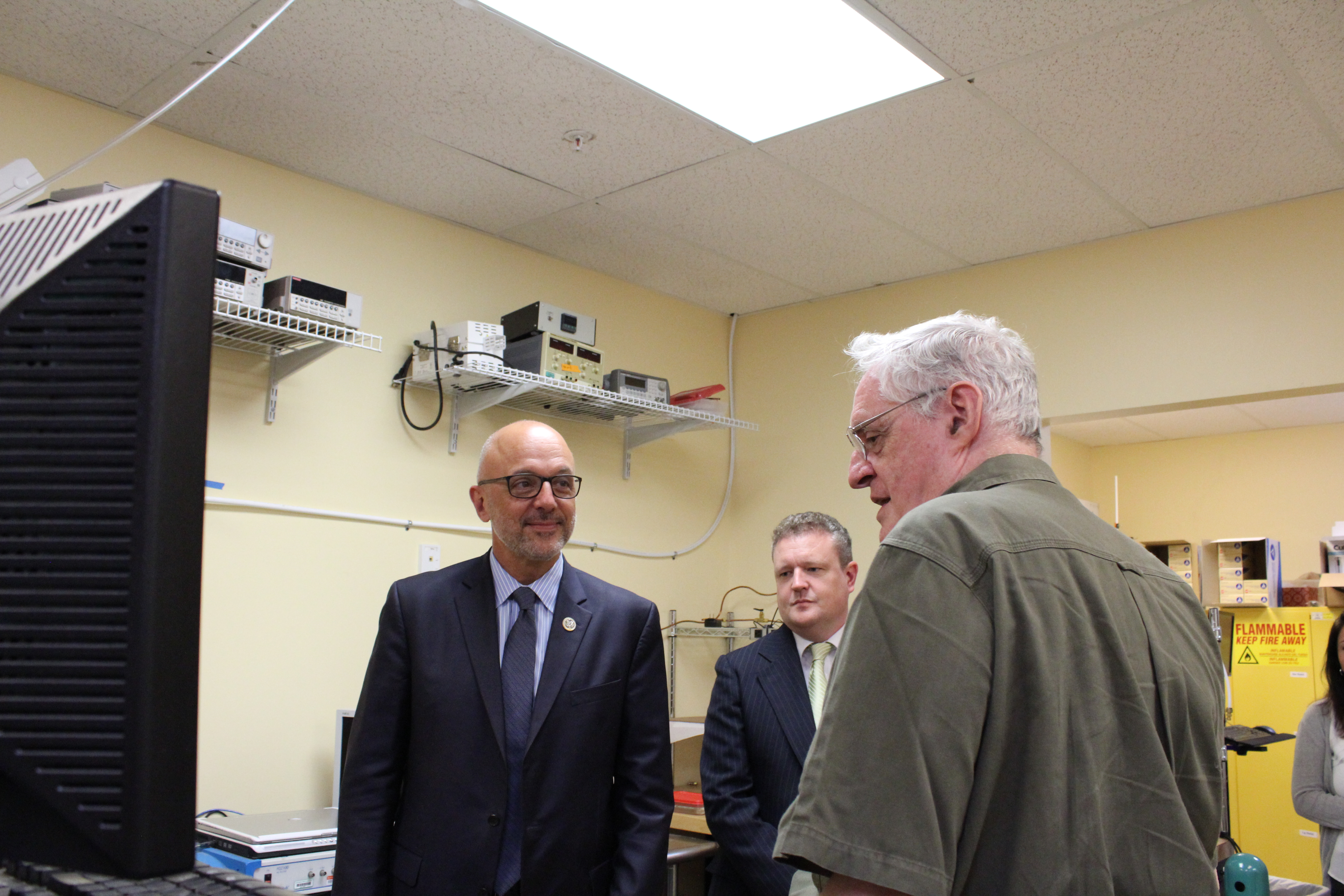
Congressman Ted Deutch visits Dioxide Materials.

Global Ventures at FAU facilitates relationships between its members and the faculty and student body at Florida Atlantic University, and can add value to companies in the areas of predominant research interest at FAU: neuroscience and health technologies, sensors, networks, artificial intelligence, the Internet of things, and environmental technologies.

The Research Park at FAU also hosts FAU Tech Runway, a South Florida public-private partnership that serves as a hub to accelerate technology development and incubate startup companies.

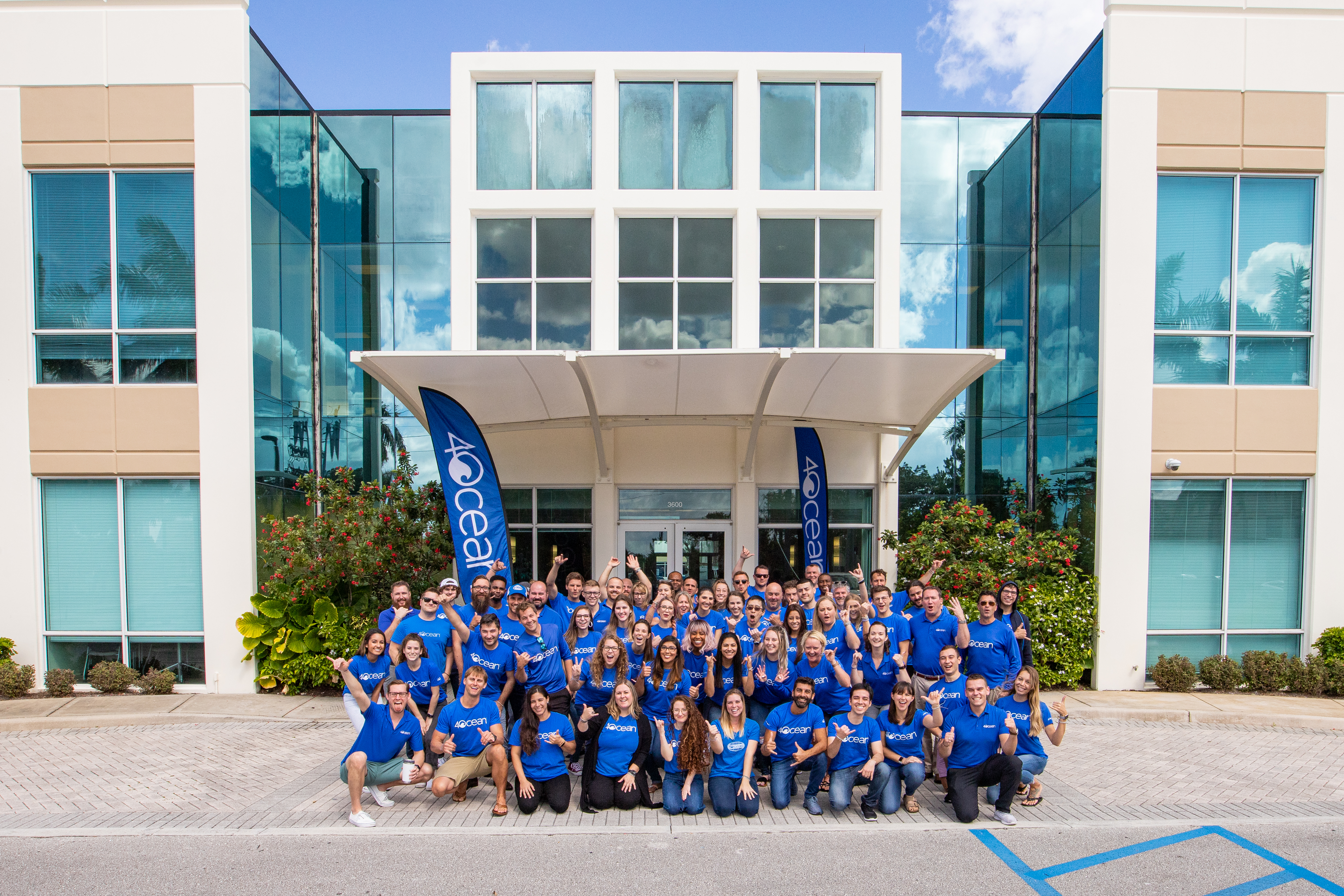
The 4ocean team at its new Research park at FAU HQ.

== Notable alumni ==
- Flagship Solutions Group
- Mobile Help
- Modernizing Medicine

== Awards ==
- Soft Landings Specialty Award, International Business Innovation Association - 2021
- Excellence In Economic Development Silver Award - Regionalism & Cross-Border Collaboration, International Economic Development Council - 2014
- Excellence In Economic Development Silver Award - Collaboration Partnerships with Educational Institutions - 2013
