= GoodPop =

American confectionery

- GoodPop company logo
- Type: Private
- Industry: Food Processing
- Founded: Austin, Texas, United States (2009)
- Founder: Daniel Goetz
- Headquarters: Austin, Texas, United States
- Products: Frozen fruit pops, shelf-stable freezer pops, frozen novelties
- Number of employees: 11-50

GoodPop is an American frozen novelty and confectionery company headquartered in Austin, Texas. It is a Certified B Corporation. The company produces fruit pops, shelf-stable freezer pops, and dairy and non-dairy frozen desserts. GoodPop was founded in 2009 by then University of Texas student Daniel Goetz.

== History ==
GoodPop was founded out of a desire to provide a healthier and more sustainable alternative to traditional frozen treats. GoodPop began selling its products at farmers markets in Austin in 2009.

In July 2025, GoodPop co-founded the Good Food Collective (GFC), a coalition of more than 25 food brands, organizations, and nutrition experts focused on greater transparency in the food industry. Founding members included LesserEvil, Quinn, and branding agency Interact. The coalition's first initiative was advocating for a stronger front-of-package nutrition label, which the group submitted as a formal comment to the FDA's proposed rulemaking on front-of-package labeling before the public comment period closed on July 15, 2025.

== See also ==
- National Organic Program
- B Corporation
- 4Ocean
- The Non-GMO Project
