= Symbion Science Park =

Science park in Copenhagen, Denmark

Symbion
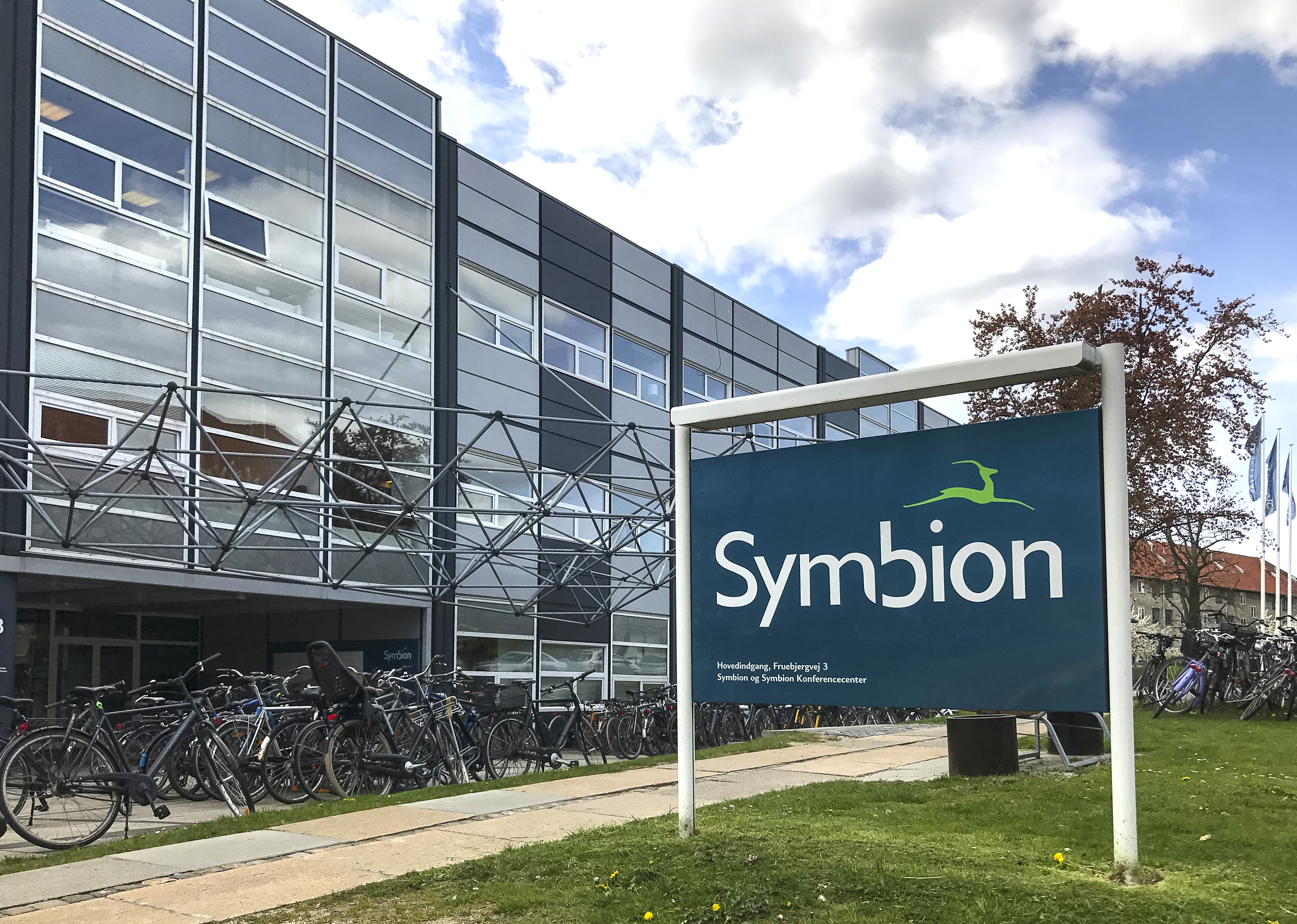
- Location: Østerbro, Islands Brygge, Frederiksberg and Nørrebro in Copenhagen
- Opening date: 1986
- Manager: Jørgen Bardenfleth (Chairman)
- Owner: Symbion A/S
- No. of tenants: 450
- Parking: yes
- Website: symbion.dk

Symbion Science Park is a startup ecosystem and community for computer technology in Copenhagen, Denmark. It is organized as a private limited company owned by the Symbion foundation, University of Copenhagen, Copenhagen Business School, and a number of private investors.

Companies in the Symbion Science Park community mainly work within the fields of IoT, AI, hardware, big data, blockchain, SaaS, edtech, agrifood, biotech, healthtech and gaming. The park comprises four locations across the city:

- Symbion at Østerbro
- Univate at the (University of Copenhagen) on Islands Brygge
- Creators Floor at (Copenhagen Business School) on Frederiksberg
- COBIS at Nørrebro.

Symbion Science Park is part of the Medicon Valley life-science cluster.

The name of "Symbion" is derived from the word "Symbiosis" which is the core thought behind the science park; mixing business and science in a symbiotic way.

== Symbion facilitates ==
Symbion Science Park offers the growth programme "Accelerace" for its startup community, as well as the following facilities:

- Coworking
- Joint offices
- Smaller private offices
- Meeting rooms
- Professional sparring
- Professional workshops and meetups
- Advisory boards
- Network groups etc.

The park houses around 450 independent and innovative startups and businesses, with 260 located at Symbion, 120 located at Univate, 20 located at Creators Floor and 50 located at COBIS. Symbion at Østerbro comprise 20,000 m². Moreover, Univate comprise 5,500 m², Creators Floor 600 m² and COBIS 12,000 m².

== History ==
Founded in 1986 by six scientists as a science and research park. Symbion was approved "an innovation environment" by the Danish Ministry of Science. This status implies that the company of Symbion is managing an unspecified amount of money on behalf of the ministry. Since then, several sub-company funds has been established by Symbion, it has been awarded several more official approvals and are now engaged in entrepreneuring across Denmark. In 2006 for example, Symbion established GazelleGrowth, a sub-company intended for internationalizing Danish companies, managing more than 32 million DKK on behalf of the Danish Ministry of Science. In 2009, Symbion established Copenhagen Bio Science Park (COBIS) in a partnership with Scion DTU and Incuba Science Park.

== Sources ==
- https://symbion.dk
