= List of science and technology parks in Italy =

Science and technology parks in Italy are facilities and organisations intended to promote collaboration between scientific research, businesses and technological innovation. Their activities include applied research, technology transfer, business incubation, support services for companies and the development of high-technology enterprises.

The following list includes major science parks and technology parks in Italy, as well as certain technology hubs, innovation districts and related organisations. It follows the broad classification used by Italian directories of the innovation ecosystem, including the VentureUp directory of science and technology parks.

== List by region ==
The list is organised by the 20 regions of Italy. A dash indicates that no organisation is included for that region in this list, rather than necessarily indicating the absence of any science or technology parks.

Science and technology parks in Italy by region
Region	Science and technology parks, technology hubs and innovation districts
Abruzzo	—
Basilicata	—
Calabria	CALPARK – Science and Technology Park of Calabria, Rende; CalabriaInnova, Settingiano
Campania	Città della Scienza, Naples
Emilia-Romagna	Torricelli Science and Technology Park, Faenza; Forlì Aerospace Technology Centre (Polo Tecnologico Aeronautico-Spaziale Forlivese), Forlì
Friuli-Venezia Giulia	AREA Science Park, Trieste; Luigi Danieli Science and Technology Park, Udine; Polo Tecnologico Alto Adriatico "Andrea Galvani", Pordenone
Lazio	Tecnopolo Tiburtino, Rome; Tecnopolo Castel Romano, Rome; P.A.L.M.E.R. Technology Park, Ferentino; Alto Lazio Science and Technology Park; Rome Technopole
Liguria	GREAT Campus, Genoa
Lombardy	ComoNExT – Innovation Hub, Lomazzo; Kilometro Rosso, Stezzano; Parco Tecnologico Padano, Lodi; POINT – Technology Innovation Centre (Polo per l'Innovazione Tecnologica), Dalmine; CSMT Innovation Hub, Brescia; OpenZone, Bresso; MIND – Milan Innovation District, Milan and Rho
Marche	C.NEXT Piceno, Ascoli Piceno
Molise	—
Piedmont	Bioindustry Park Silvano Fumero, Colleretto Giacosa; Environment Park, Turin; Fondazione Novara Sviluppo, Novara; Scrivia Valley Science and Technology Park, Tortona
Apulia	Tecnopolis, Valenzano
Sardinia	Sardinia Technology Park (Parco tecnologico della Sardegna), with facilities in Pula, Alghero, Macchiareddu and Torregrande
Sicily	Science and Technology Park of Sicily (Parco scientifico e tecnologico della Sicilia), Catania
Tuscany	Consorzio Polo Tecnologico Magona, Cecina; Technological and Archaeological Park of the Grosseto Metalliferous Hills; Navacchio Technology Hub (Polo Tecnologico di Navacchio), Cascina; Polo Tecnologico Lucchese, Lucca; Toscana Life Sciences, Siena
Trentino-Alto Adige/Südtirol	NOI Techpark, Bolzano; Trentino Sviluppo – Polo Meccatronica, Rovereto
Umbria	3A-PTA – Agri-Food Technology Park of Umbria, Todi
Aosta Valley	—
Veneto	Galileo Visionary District, Padua; VEGA – Venice Gateway for Science and Technology, Venice; STAR Science and Technology Park, Verona

This list adopts a broad definition of science and technology parks. In the Italian innovation ecosystem, the terms science and technology park, technology park, technology hub, innovation hub and innovation district may describe organisations with partly overlapping functions. The list therefore includes organisations that are not necessarily classified as science parks in the strict sense.

== See also ==
- Science park
- Science and technology in Italy
- List of research parks
- Innovation
- Scientific research
- Research and development
- Technology transfer
- Business incubator
- Startup company
