= Medicon Village =

Science park in Lund, Sweden

- Interactive map of Medicon Village
- Location: Lund, Sweden
- Coordinates: 55.710178°N 13.219764°E
- Opening date: 2010
- No. of tenants: 180
- No. of workers: 2,800
- Website: Medicon Village

Medicon Village is a life science research park in Lund, Sweden. It is located on the eastern outskirts of Lund University.

Medicon Village is involved in the Medicon Valley cross-border cooperation with Denmark. The park was created as a transformation of former Astra Zeneca buildings in 2010 and are now employing more than 2,800 people in over 180 organisations here. The total area available for letting within Medicon Village amounts to around 132,000 m^{2}, of which laboratories account for about 65,000 m^{2} which makes it the largest science park in Scandinavia focusing on life science.

== Sources ==
- Medicon Village
- Mats Paulsson Foundation
- Medicon Valley Alliance
