= Medicon Valley =

- Life-science research and business cluster
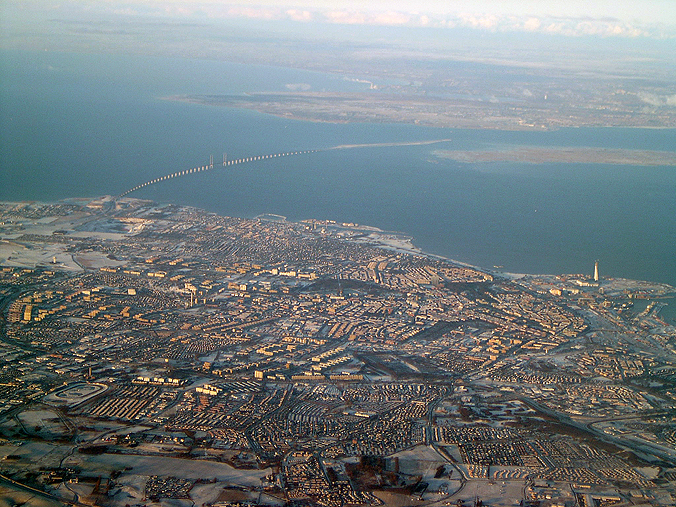
- Aerial view of the bi-national Medicon Valley region, straddling the Öresund strait, between Sweden and Denmark.

- Medicon Valley in Denmark and Sweden
- Country: Denmark and Sweden
- Region: Øresund Region
- Founded: 1997

Population
  - Total: 3.9 million
- Website: Medicon Valley and Medicon Valley Alliance

Medicon Valley is an international life-sciences cluster in Europe, spanning the Øresund Region of eastern Denmark and southern Sweden. It is one of Europe's strongest life science clusters, with many life science companies and research institutions located within a relatively small geographical area. The name has officially been in use since 1997.

Major life science sectors of the Medicon Valley cluster includes pharmacology, biotechnology, health tech, and medical technology. It is specifically known for its research in the areas of neurological disorders, inflammatory diseases, cancer and diabetes.

== Background and activities ==
The population of the Øresund region reaches close to 4 million inhabitants and in 2008, 60% of Scandinavian pharmaceutical companies were located within the region. The region includes 17 universities, 32 hospitals, and more than 400 life science companies, of which 20 are large pharmaceutical or medical technology firms and 170 are dedicated biotechnology firms. Between 1998 and 2008, 100 new biotechnology and medical technology companies were started here. The biotechnology industry alone, employs around 41,000 people in the region, 7,000 of whom are academic researchers.

International companies with major research centres in the Øresund region include Novo Nordisk, Novozymes-Novonesis, Baxter, Lundbeck, Leo Pharma, Genmab, Bavarian Nordic, Zealand Pharma, HemoCue and Ferring Pharmaceuticals. There are more than seven science parks in the region, all with a significant focus on life science, including the Medicon Village in Lund, established in 2010. Companies within Medicon Valley account for more than 20% of the total GDP of Denmark and Sweden combined.

Medicon Valley is promoted by Invest in Skåne and Copenhagen Capacity.

Many of the Øresund region's universities have a strong heritage in biological and medical research and have produced several Nobel Prize winners. The almost century-long presence of a number of research-intensive and fully integrated pharmaceutical companies, such as Novo Nordisk, H. Lundbeck and LEO Pharma, has also contributed significantly to the medical research and business development of the region by strengthening abilities within applied research, attracting suppliers and producing spin-offs.

In 2011, the organisations of MVA and Invest in Skåne, launched the concept of Beacons. Beacons are projects for creating world-leading cross-disciplinary research environments with a focus on areas where there are considerable potential for synergies in Medicon Valley specifically. After a long thorough selection process, the four Beacons of systems biology, structural biology, immune regulation and drug delivery were approved.

The Medicon Valley issues the quaternal life science magazine "Medicon Valley".

== Science parks ==
Science parks in Medicon Valley includes:

- Copenhagen Bio Science Park (COBIS)
- Ideon Science Park, largest of its kind in Scandinavia.
- Krinova Science Park
- Medeon Science Park
- Medicon Village
- Scion DTU
- Symbion Science Park

== Sources and further reading ==
- "Medicon Valley Facts". Medicon Valley.
- "Medicon Valley Region". Medicon Valley Alliance.
- M. Akinola; et al. (2012). "The Medicon Valley in Denmark and Sweden: an emerging northern star?". eech. Grenoble Ecole de Management & Lab-Center for Competitiveness. A case study.
- Nauwelaers, C.; Maguire, K.; Ajmone Marsan, G. (2013). "The case of Oresund (Denmark-Sweden) – Regions and Innovation: Collaborating Across Borders" (PDF). OECD Regional Development Working Papers (21). OECD Publishing. doi:10.1787/20737009.
