= McMaster Innovation Park =

McMaster Innovation Park

McMaster Innovation Park (MIP) is an innovation and research facility located approximately two kilometres east of McMaster University in Hamilton, Ontario. McMaster Innovation Park focuses on supporting startups, business, research through providing property management services as well as business aid. Entrepreneurs, firms, researchers, industry partners, business mentors and support facilities are the main customers of the firm. MIP currently houses five buildings: the Atrium@MIP, CanmetMATERIALS, McMaster Automotive Resource Centre (MARC), Biomedical Engineering and Advanced Manufacturing (BEAM) project centre and envisions 10 buildings on site within 10 years with 1,500–1,800 people working full-time.

== History ==
In early 2005, McMaster University announced its plans to build a research park on property previously used by an appliance manufacturing company. Later in year, the Province of Ontario allocated $10 million in funding to the project and MIP was well into the development stages. Also in 2005, the Federal Government announced that it would be moving the CanmetMATERIALS Technology Laboratory to MIP, making the park a focal point for innovation in technology for the entire country. In October 2009, The Atrium@MIP had its grand opening, meaning the park itself was officially open. By February 2011, the CanmetMATERIALS Building was complete, and the federal government had moved from Ottawa into MIP. Construction of the MARC Building had begun in 2011, and it was completed in fall of 2013. Tenants moved in and started working on their state-of-the-art automotive technology research.

== The Atrium@MIP ==
The Atrium@MIP houses over 114 tenants ranging from start-up companies and accelerators to research labs. It was the first completed multi-tenant building at McMaster Innovation Park.

The Atrium@MIP multi-tenant building is the only remaining office building that was part of Camco's Manufacturing plant, which operated in Hamilton for almost 100 years. MIP has now transformed what once was the site of Westinghouse/Camco Warehouse and Manufacturing plants into a research park. MIP houses several displays showing historical retrospectives of the site and of Westinghouse's activity in Hamilton. The demolition and site reclamation began 2005 and was completed in 2009.

== CanmetMATERIALS ==
The CanmetMATERIALS research centre is dedicated to metals and materials fabrication, processing and evaluation.

CanmetMATERIALS is part of the Department of Natural Resources Canada and relocated from Ottawa to McMaster Innovation Park in 2011 to strategically locate itself at the center of the Canadian manufacturing sector. This building of 167,000 square feet located at 183 Longwood Rd. South houses over 100 staff who undertake over 100 collaborative research and development projects per year with industry, academia and other government departments.

== McMaster Automotive Resource Centre ==
The McMaster Automotive Resource Centre is one of Canada’s leading research facilities in electric and hybrid vehicles.

The MARC building was developed in 2013 within an existing building at 200 Longwood Rd. South. The $26-million facility occupies approximately 90,000 square feet on two floors and is one of very few in the world located in an academic setting allowing both private and public sectors to work together to develop, design, and test hybrid technology. The redeveloped space includes commercial garage space with multiple bays ready to receive cars for experiments and testing.

== Future projects ==
McMaster University and the Fraunhofer Institute for Cell therapy and Immunology are collaborating at McMaster Innovation Park to develop a project centre focused on the fast emerging cell therapies industry. This project centre, the Centre for Biomedical Engineering and Advanced Manufacturing (BEAM), will develop innovative technologies to automate production for cell therapies, significantly lowering the cost to treat degenerative diseases like cancer. The Fraunhofer Institute for Cell Therapy and Immunology IZI, located in Leipzig, Germany, has the objective to find solutions to specific problems at the interfaces between medicine, life sciences and engineering for partners active in medicine-related industries and businesses. The Institute works closely with hospital institutions, performing quality tests and clinical studies in cooperation with its many partners.

The Emerging Technology Centre (ETC) is a project at development at McMaster Innovation Park. The ETC will have: 40,000 square feet of lab space, 5,000 square feet of lab incubator space and an atrium area. The building focuses on the research and emerging technology.

Metrolinx plans to build an Operations, Maintenance, and Storage facility (OMSF) for the proposed Hamilton LRT which will run nearby.
