= Sânzieni =

Sânzieni Kézdiszentlélek
- Commune
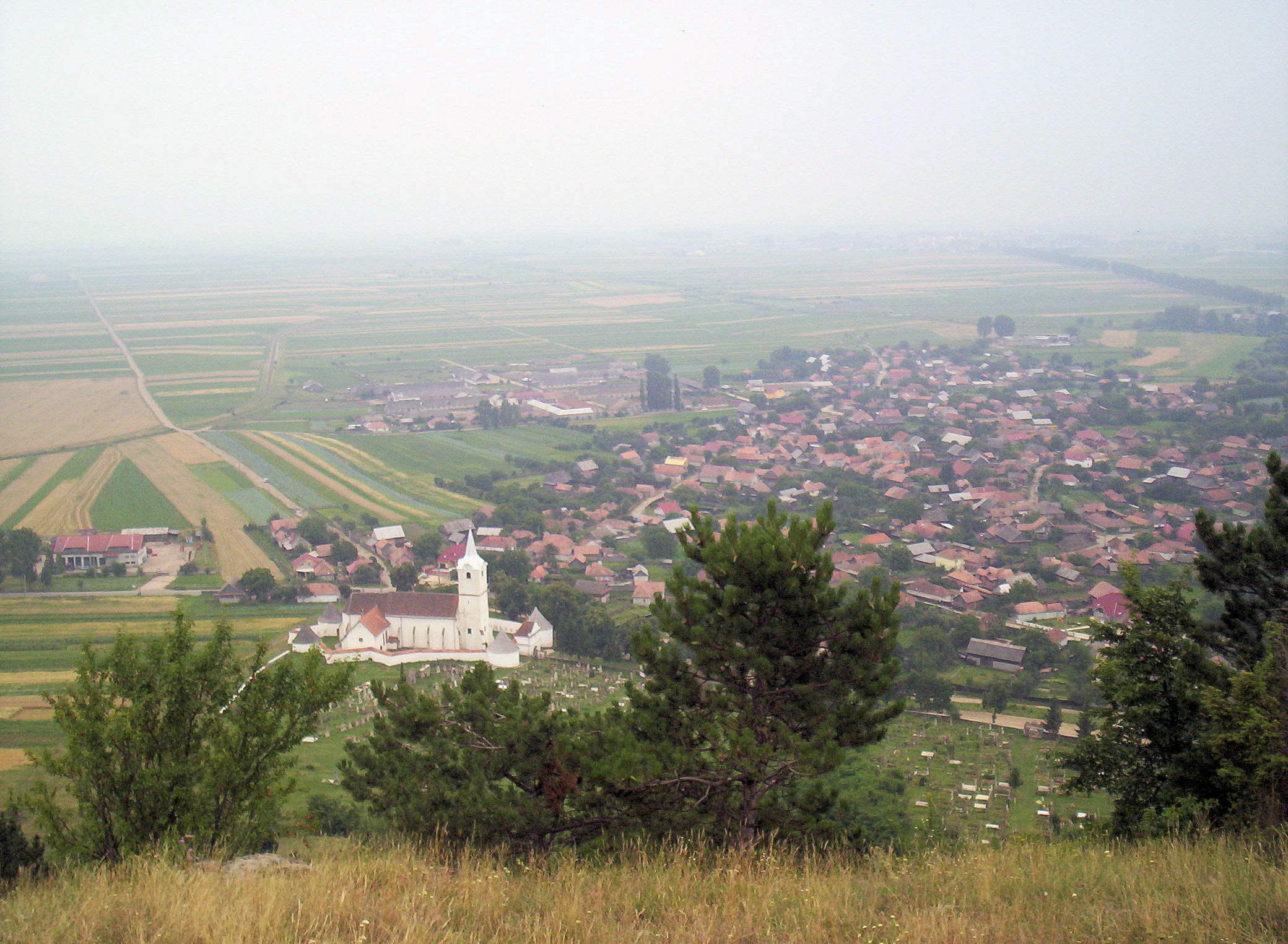
- The village from the peak Perkő

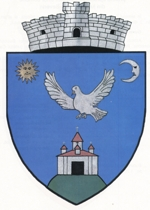
- Coat of arms

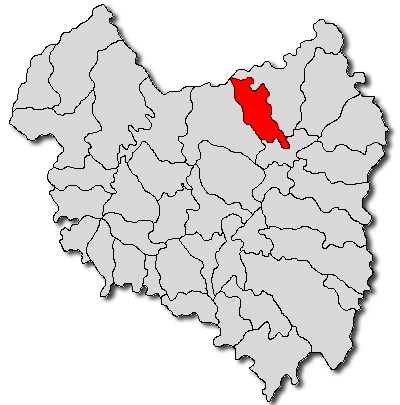
- Location in Covasna County

- Location in Romania
- Coordinates: 46°03′N 26°08′E
- Country: Romania
- County: Covasna

Government
  - Mayor (2020–2024): Tibor Balogh (UDMR)
- Area: 96.70 km^{2} (37.34 sq mi)
- Elevation: 588 m (1,929 ft)
- Population (2021-12-01): 4,408
  - Density: 45.58/km^{2} (118.1/sq mi)
- Time zone: UTC+02:00 (EET)
  - Summer (DST): UTC+03:00 (EEST)
- Postal code: 527150
- Area code: (+40) 02 67
- Vehicle reg.: CV
- Website: sanzieni.ro

Sânzieni (Hungarian: Kézdiszentlélek, Hungarian pronunciation: [ˈkeːzdisɛntleːlɛk]) is a commune in Covasna County, Transylvania, Romania composed of four villages: Cașinu Mic (Kiskászon), Petriceni (Kézdikővár), Sânzieni, and Valea Seacă (Kézdiszárazpatak).

== Geography ==
The commune is situated in the eastern foothills of the Bodoc Mountains, at an altitude of 588 m (1,929 ft), on the banks of the river Cașin. It is located in the northern part of Covasna County, 5 km (3.1 mi) north of the city of Târgu Secuiesc and 41 km (25 mi) northeast of the county seat, Sfântu Gheorghe, on the border with Harghita County. It is crossed by national road DN11B, which connects Târgu Secuiesc to Cozmeni, Harghita County.

== History ==
Sânzieni formed part of the Székely Land region of the historical Transylvania province. Until 1918, the village belonged to the Háromszék County of the Kingdom of Hungary. In the immediate aftermath of World War I, following the declaration of the Union of Transylvania with Romania, the area passed under Romanian administration during the Hungarian–Romanian War of 1918–1919. By the terms of the Treaty of Trianon of 1920, it became part of the Kingdom of Romania.

In 1925, the commune fell within Plasa Târgu Secuiesc of Trei Scaune County. In August 1940, under the auspices of Nazi Germany, which imposed the Second Vienna Award, Hungary retook the territory of Northern Transylvania (which included Sânzieni) from Romania. Towards the end of World War II, however, the commune was taken back from Hungarian and German troops by Romanian and Soviet forces in September 1944. In 1950, after Communist Romania was established, Sânzieni became part of the Târgu Secuiesc Raion of Stalin Region. From 1952 and 1960, it was part of the Magyar Autonomous Region, and between 1960 and 1968 it reverted to Brașov Region. In 1968, when Romania was reorganized based on counties rather than regions, Sânzieni became part of Covasna County.

== Demographics ==
Historical population
Year	Pop.	±%
2002	4,682	—
2011	4,582	−2.1%
2021	4,408	−3.8%
Source: Census data

The commune has an absolute Székely Hungarian majority. According to the 2011 census, it had a population of 4,582, of which 98.04% were Hungarians. At the 2021 census, Sânzieni had 4,408 inhabitants; of those, 92.42% were Hungarians and 3.61% Roma.

== International relations ==
Sânzieni is twinned with Újbuda, Budapest, Hungary.

== See also ==
- Dacian fortress of Sânzieni
- Dacian fortress of Valea Seacă
