= Újbuda =

11th District of Budapest Budapest XI. kerülete Újbuda
- District of Budapest
- District XI
- Flag Coat of arms

- Location of District XI in Budapest (shown in grey)
- Coordinates: 47°28′30″N 19°02′24″E
- Country: Hungary
- Region: Central Hungary
- City: Budapest
- Established: 1 March 1934
- Quarters: List: Albertfalva; Dobogó; Gazdagrét; Gellérthegy; Hosszúrét; Infopark; Kamaraerdő; Kelenföld; Kelenvölgy; Kőérberek; Lágymányos; Madárhegy; Nádorkert; Őrmező; Örsöd; Péterhegy; Pösingermajor; Sasad; Sashegy; Spanyolrét; Szentimreváros

Government
  - Mayor: Imre László (DK)
  - Deputy Mayor: Zita Bakai-Nagy (DK); Anna Orosz (Momentum); Richárd Barabás (Dialogue); György Hintsch (MSZP)

Area
  - Total: 33.49 km^{2} (12.93 sq mi)
  - Rank: 8th

Population (2016)
  - Total: 151,812
  - Rank: 1st
  - Density: 4,533/km^{2} (11,740/sq mi)
- Demonym: tizenegyedik kerületi ("11th districter")
- Time zone: UTC+1 (CET)
  - Summer (DST): UTC+2 (CEST)
- Postal code: 1111 ... 1119
- Website: www.ujbuda.hu

Újbuda (lit. New Buda) is the 11th district of Budapest (Hungarian: Budapest XI. kerület), Hungary. It is the most populous district of Budapest with 137,426 inhabitants (2008). Until the 1890s, Újbuda's present territory was a field south of the historical town of Buda. The construction of a new residential area started in the 1900s, the present district was formed in 1930. From 1880 to 1980, Újbuda's population increased from 1,180 to 178,960. There are boulevards, avenues with tram lines, and communist-era housing estates in the district. Line 4 of the Budapest metro passes through Újbuda.

== Neighborhoods ==
- Albertfalva
- Dobogó
- Gazdagrét
- Gellérthegy (partially)
- Hosszúrét
- Infopark
- Kamaraerdő
- Kelenföld
- Kelenvölgy
- Kőérberek
- Lágymányos
- Madárhegy
- Nádorkert
- Őrmező
- Örsöd
- Péterhegy
- Pösingermajor
- Sasad
- Sashegy (partially)
- Szentimreváros
- Spanyolrét
- Tabán (partially)

== Population ==
Ethnic groups (2001 census)

- Magyars - 91.4%
- Germans - 1.2%
- Others - 1.8%
- No answer - 5.6%

Religions (2001 census)

- Roman Catholic - 47.1%
- Calvinist - 12%
- Lutheran - 2.8%
- Greek Catholic - 1.4%
- Jewish - 0.45%
- Other (Christian) - 1%
- Other (non-Christian) - 0.5%
- Atheists - 18%
- No answer, unknown - 16.6%

Historical population
Year	Pop.	±%
1870	1,149	—
1880	1,180	+2.7%
1890	3,092	+162.0%
1900	7,191	+132.6%
1910	23,457	+226.2%
1920	37,025	+57.8%
1930	52,337	+41.4%
1941	76,668	+46.5%
1949	86,804	+13.2%
1960	109,124	+25.7%
1970	161,437	+47.9%
1980	178,960	+10.9%
1990	174,509	−2.5%
2001	144,441	−17.2%
2006	136,503	−5.5%
2008	137,426	+0.7%

== Transport ==
Traffic to Budapest from Western Hungary enters the city in this district; a main road, Budaörsi út is the direct continuation of motorways M1 and M7. Three bridges on the Danube are located in the district; the bridges Liberty, Petőfi and Rákóczi/Lágymányosi connect the district to the neighboring 5th and 9th districts on the Pest side.

Kelenföld Railway Station, the fourth largest railway station of Budapest is in the district. Most of the trains heading to Western Hungary and Western Europe pass through the station (including commuter trains to the agglomeration). The district also has a smaller station, the Albertfalva station.

Kelenföld Railway Station is also the terminus for Metro Line M4; the line, opened in 2014, is the first of the Budapest Metro to serve the district, where it has 5 of its 10 stations. It connects the district with Keleti Railway Station, the largest railway station in Hungary. Next to the Kelenföld Railway Station there is also a major bus station for local buses and another for buses serving the nearby towns.

The district has 46 bus lines, 9 night bus lines and 11 tram lines (among them Lines 4 and 6, two of the most important tram lines of the city, both of which have their terminus in the district).

There are no airports with scheduled flights within the district, however, it is home to Budaörs Airport, the pre-1950 main airport of Hungary. This was the second international airport in Budapest (after Mátyásföld Airfield), and the oldest still existing one, although today it serves general aviation only. During World War I one of the first military airfields, Albertfalva Military Airfield was located in the district, next to the first Hungarian airplane factory.

== List of mayors ==
Member	Party	Date
Emil Bánhegyi	SZDSZ	1990–1994
Ferenc Szegedi	MDF	1994–1998
Katalin Juhos	Fidesz	1998–2002
Gyula Molnár	MSZP	2002–2010
Tamás Hoffmann	Fidesz	2010–2019
Imre László	DK	2019–

Party	Seats	Current District Assembly
Opposition coalition (Note: Coalition of Momentum–DK–MSZP–Dialogue.)	17	M
Fidesz-KDNP	7	
Our Homeland Movement	1	

== International relations ==
=== Twin towns – Sister cities ===
Újbuda is twinned with:

- Ruse, Bulgaria
- Prague 5 - Czech Republic
- Trogir - Croatia
- Vienna – Döbling – Austria
- Ustroń - Poland
- Bad Cannstatt Stuttgart – Germany
- Sânzieni (Kézdiszentlélek) – Romania
- Târgu Mureş (Marosvásárhely) – Romania
- Trstice (Nádszeg) – Slovakia
- Ada – Serbia
- Cortona – Italy
- Berehove Raion – Ukraine
- Yiwu – China

== See also ==
- Újpest
- Újpalota
- Újlipótváros

== Gallery ==
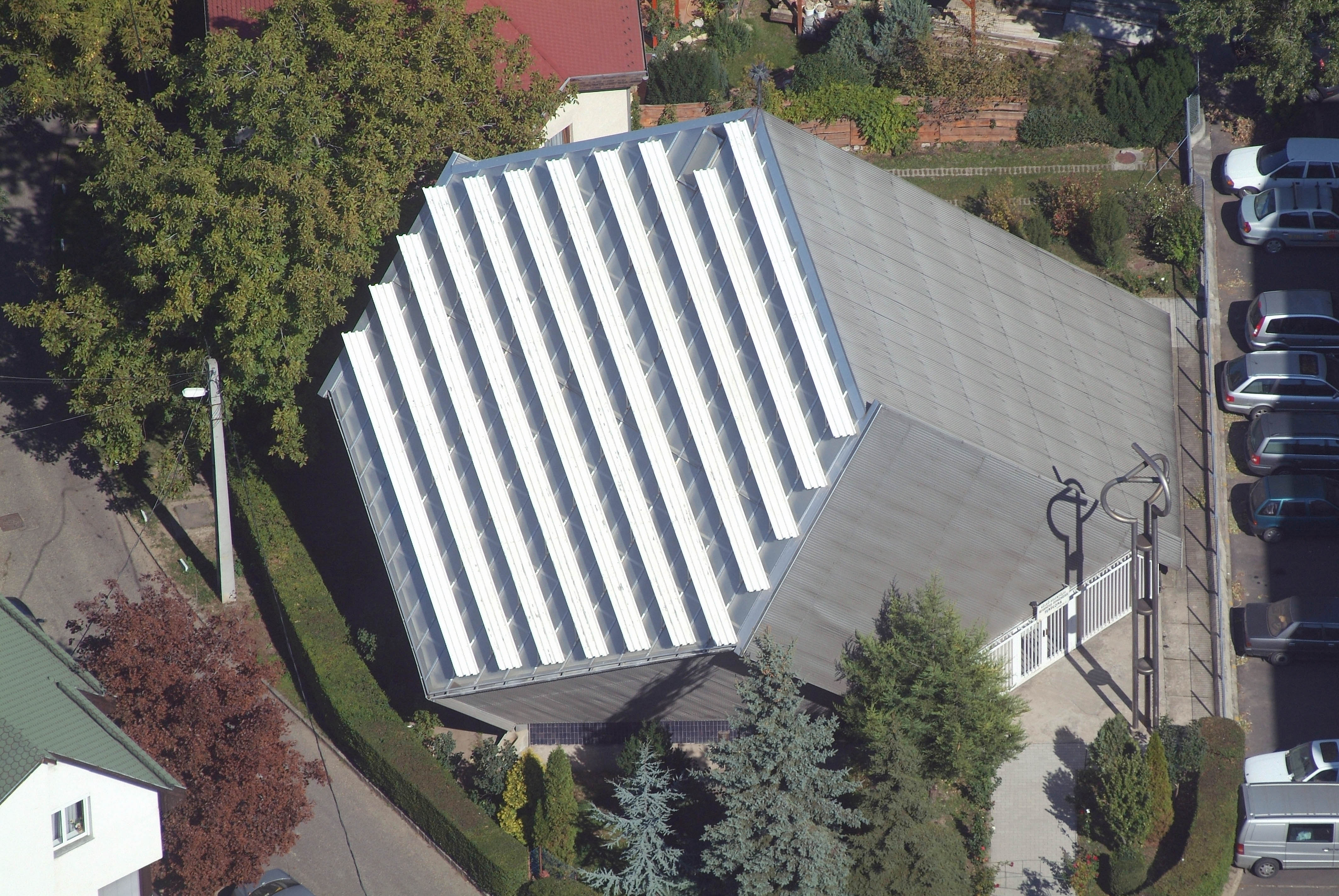

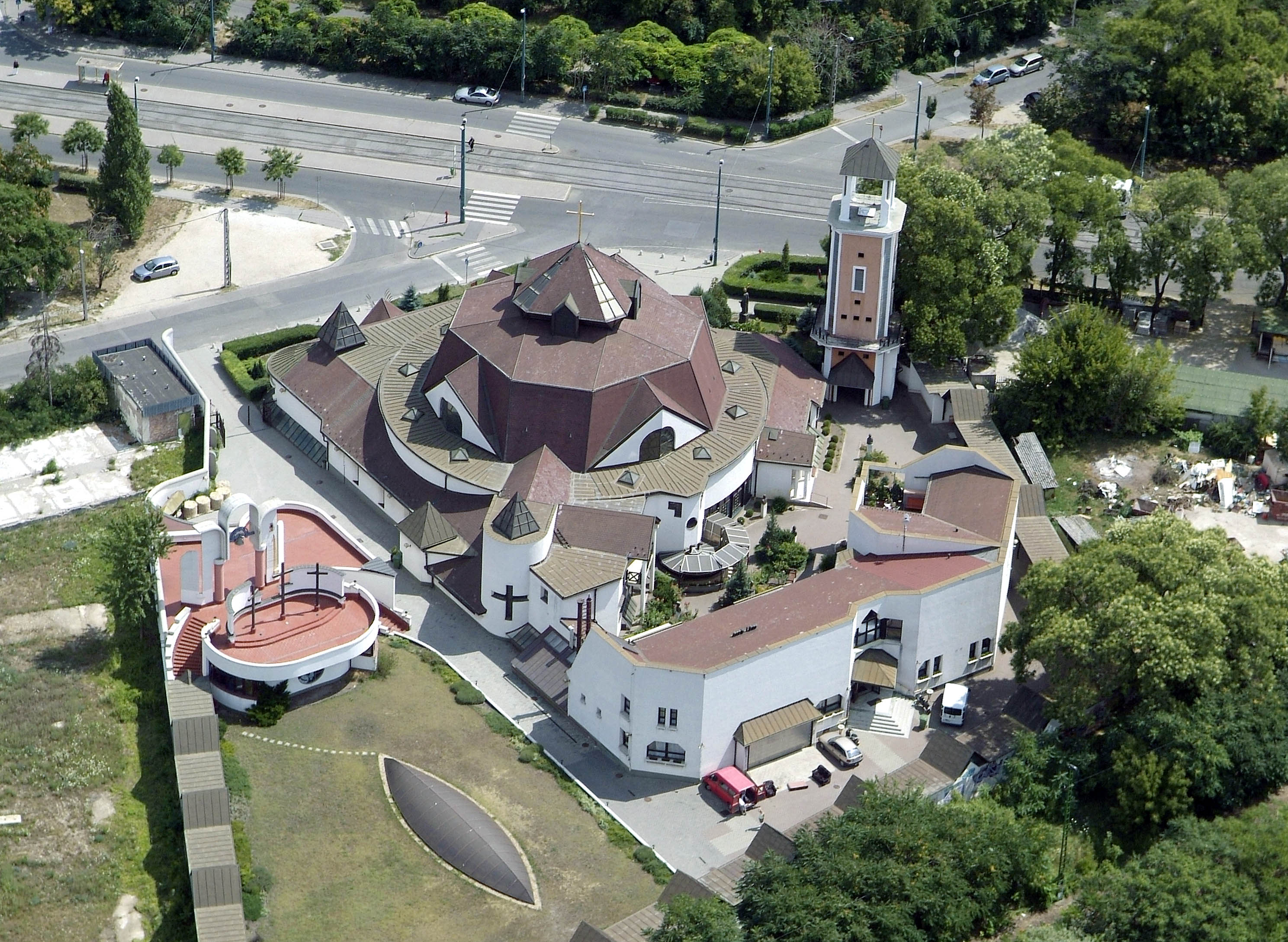

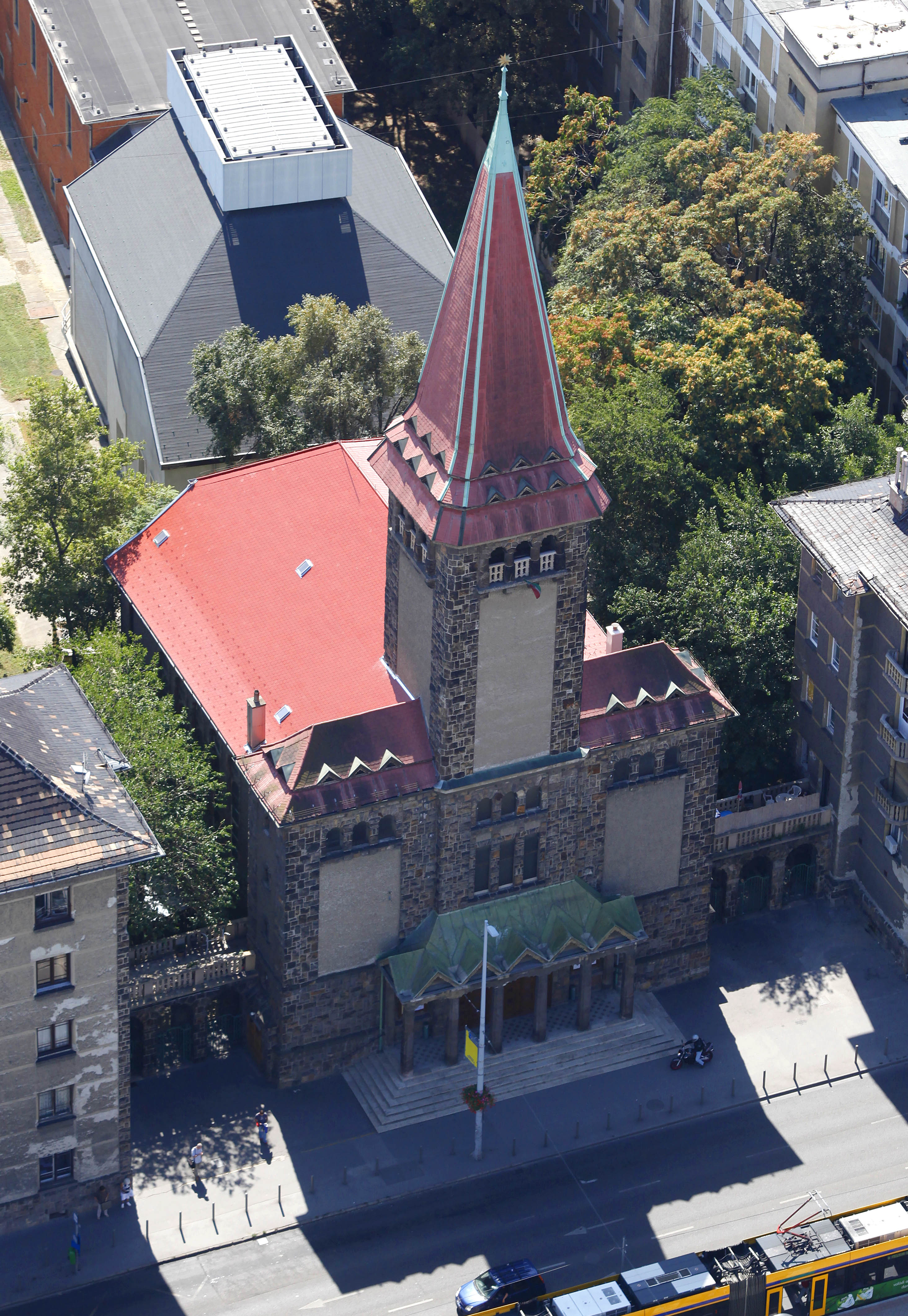

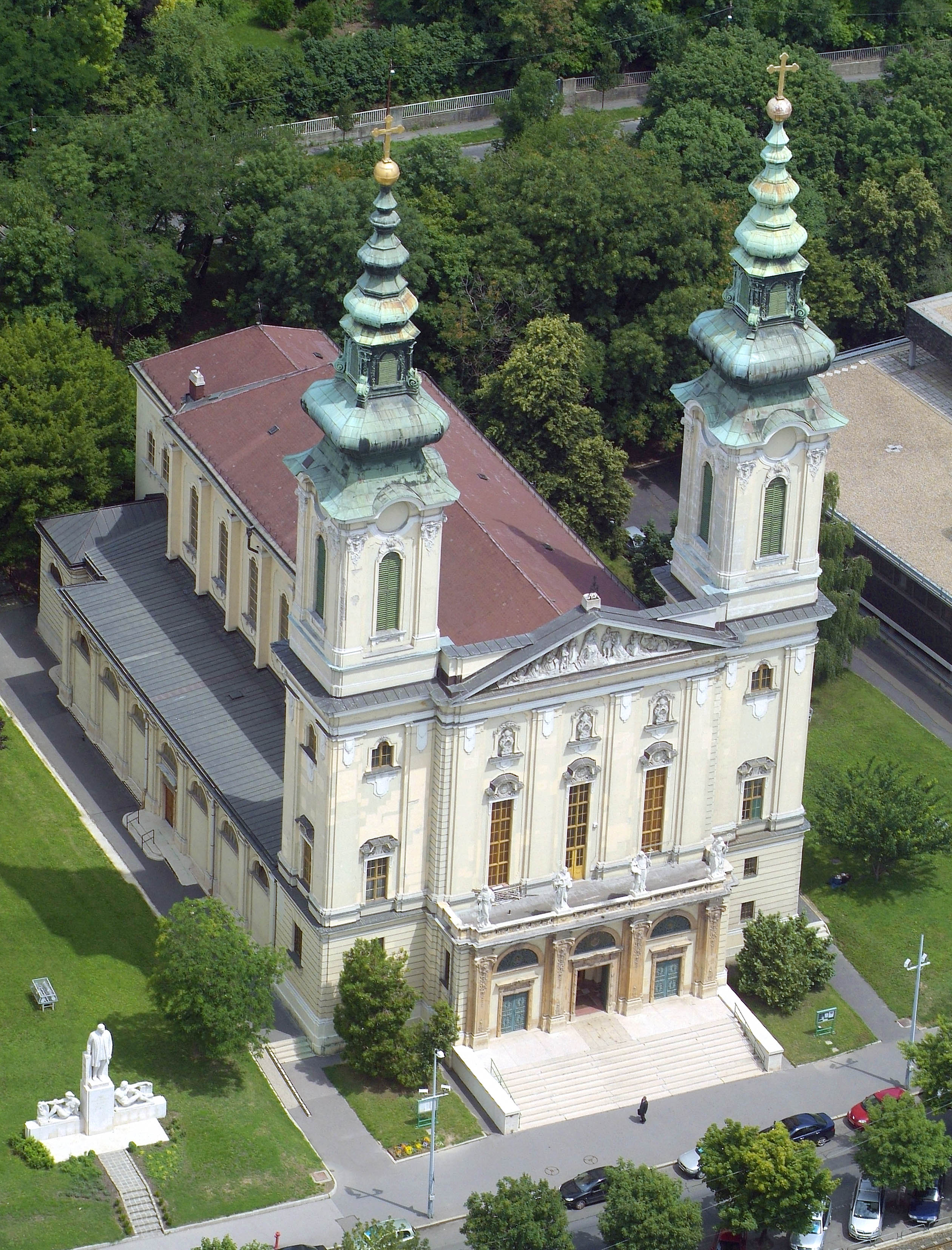

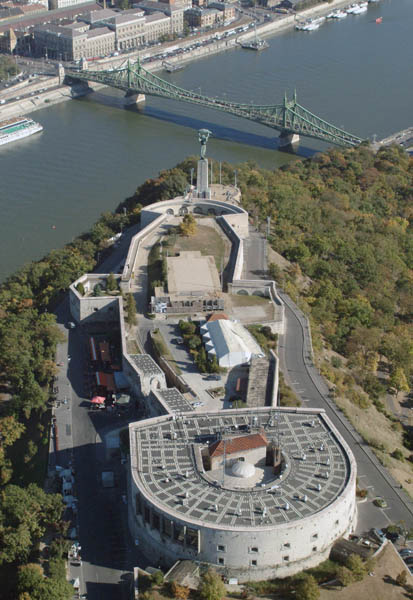

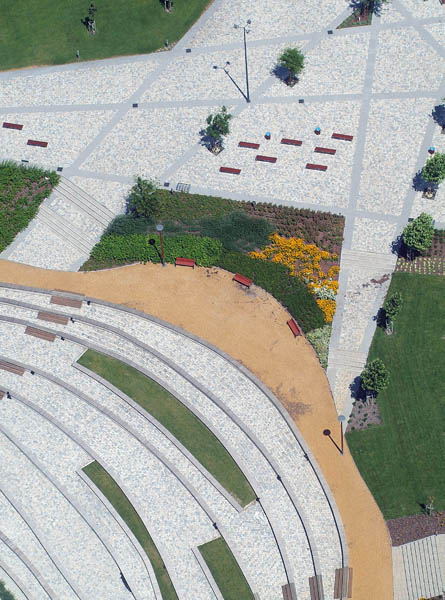

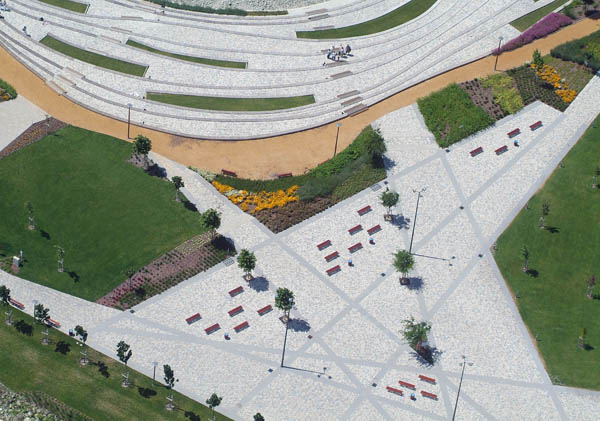

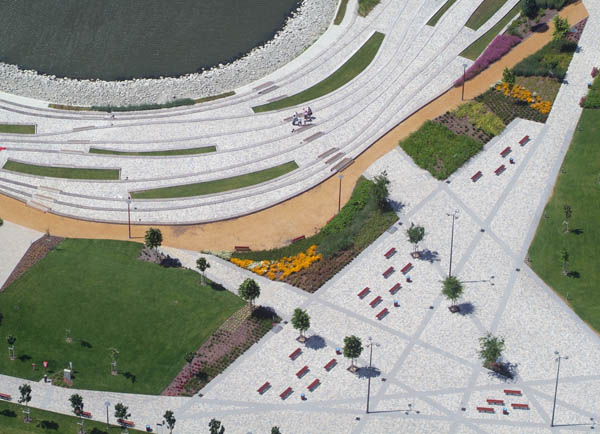

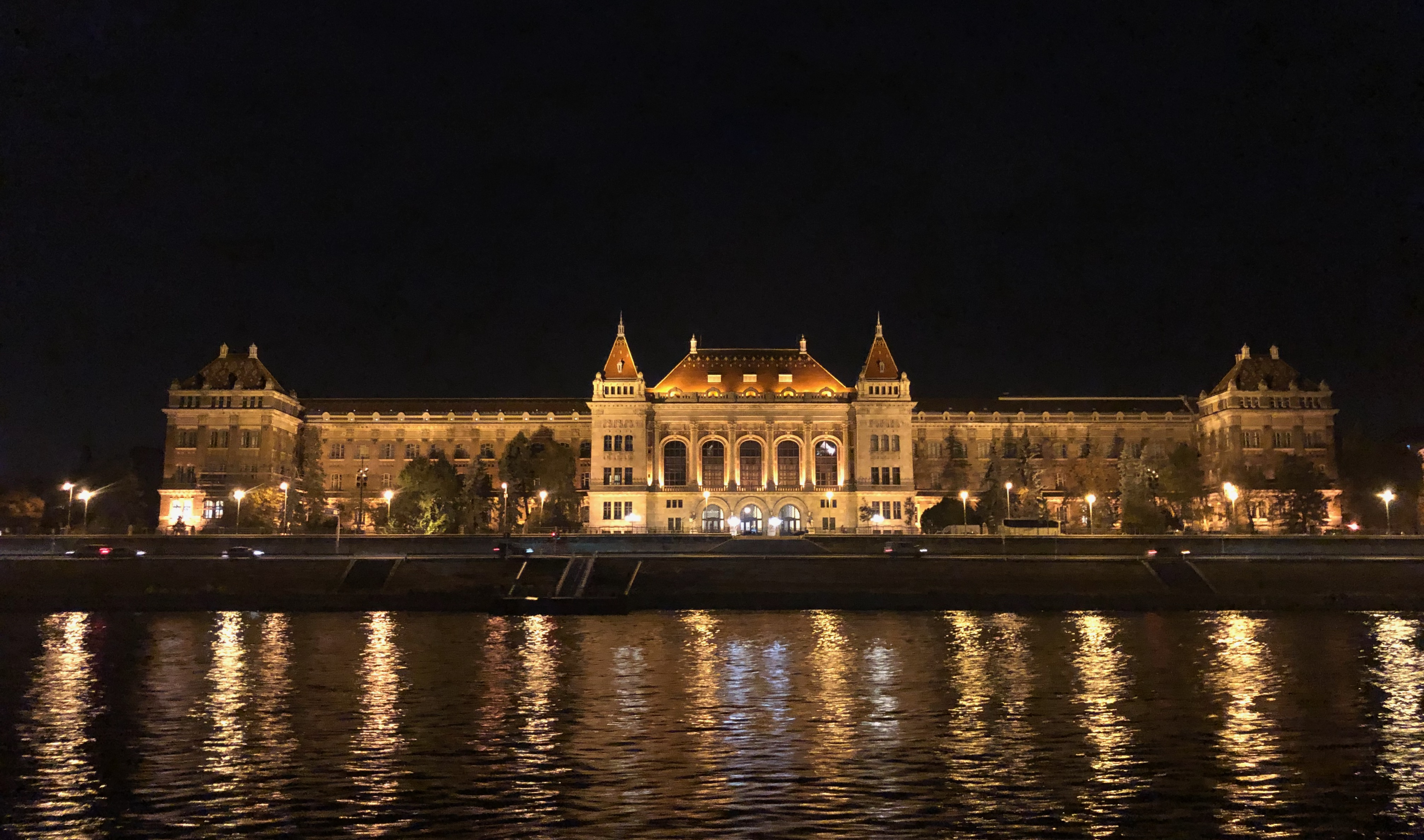
University
