= Dacian fortress of Valea Seacă =

- Location within Romania
- 46.08°N 26.12°E
- Location: Valea Seacă, Covasna, Romania

Site notes
- Condition: Ruined

Monument istoric
- Reference no.: CV-I-s-B-13079

It was a Dacian fortified town.
