= Dacian fortress of Sânzieni =

- Location within Romania
- 46.04°N 26.13°E
- Location: Coama cetății, Sânzieni, Covasna, Romania

Site notes
- Condition: Ruined

Monument istoric
- Reference no.: CV-I-m-B-13079

The Dacian fortress of Sânzieni was a Dacian fortified town. It was located in the town of Sânzieni, Romania.
