= Infopark, Budapest =

Business district in Budapest, Hungary

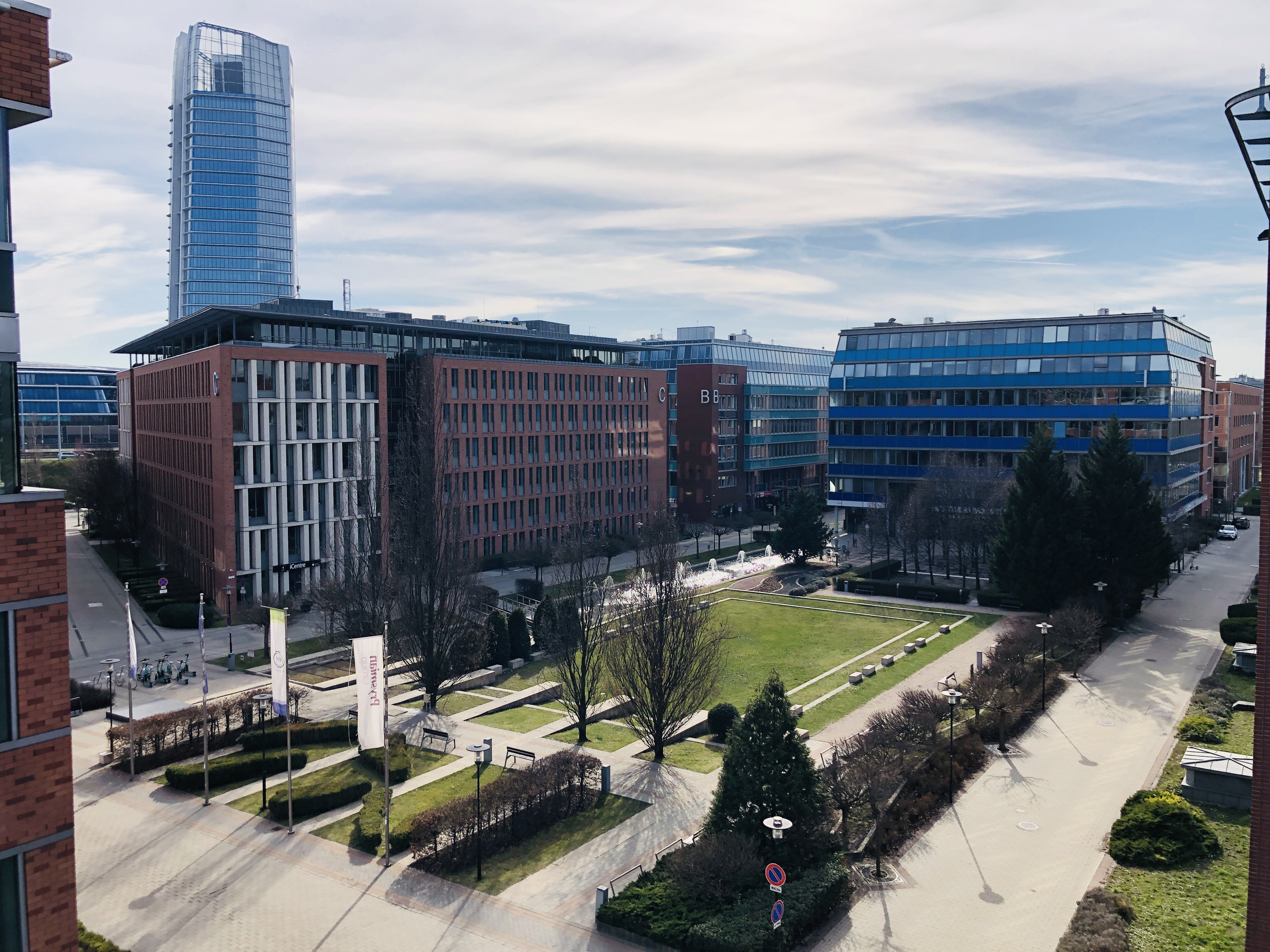
The central part of the Infopark from the top of one of the buildings

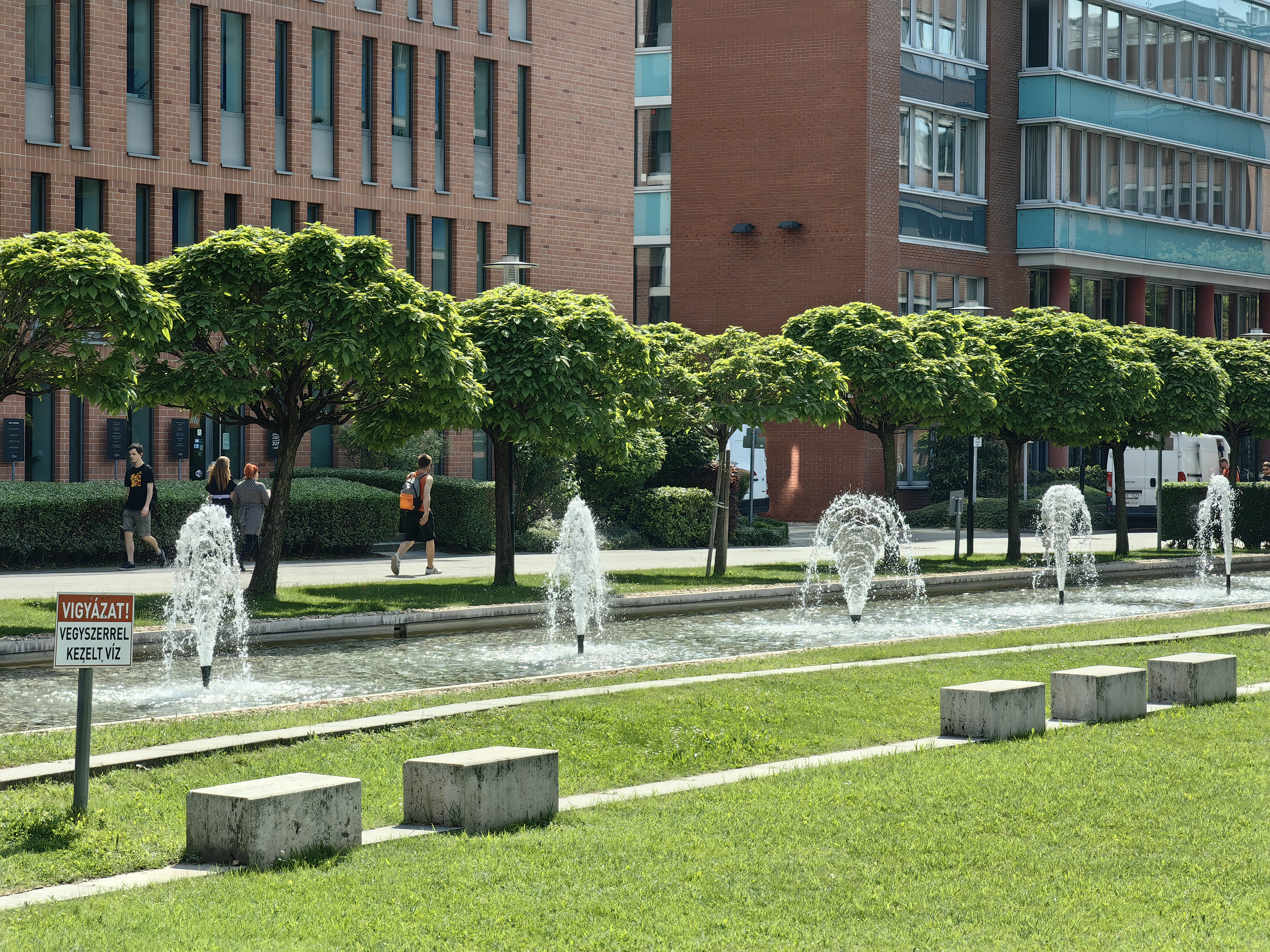
A campus-like park between the buildings

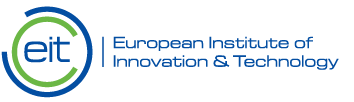
The seat of the European Institute for Innovation and Technology is found in the Infopark

Infopark is a collective name given to a high tech, mainly research and development focused business district in Budapest, focused on software, electronics, and telecommunication, finance, business consulting located in Budapest's District XI on the bank of Danube.

Infopark is the first innovation and technology park in Central and Eastern Europe. The office park has more than 100,000 m2 of leasable area built up until 2009, and has been expanded further in the following years, and is now expanding to the other side of the Rákóczi Bridge. The Infopark's campus-style buildings, the office park's sophisticated landscape design, its frequented location and its 'A' category offices make it attractive to tenants.

== History ==
The project was initiated by the Hungarian government as a joint venture between IVG Immobilien GmbH and Infopark Rt. in May 1996. Infopark Rt. was established by the government for the implementation of the project and it received funding from the European Union's Phare programme. The location for the project was on part of a site originally intended for an EXPO conceived jointly in 1986 by the Hungary and Austria governments that never materialized. Infopark leased the land for the construction of the buildings for 99 years to investors.

Construction of the buildings started in 1998. The first building was occupied by information and technology firms. The second building was designed for MATÁV.

== Tenants ==
The seat of the European Institute for Innovation and Technology is found in the Infopark. Budapest University of Technology and Economics is also located here, which is the most significant Institute of technology in the country and is considered the world's oldest, founded in 1782 institute of technology which has university rank and structure. The Hungarian Research Network's Research Centre for Natural Sciences and the Faculty of Informatics of the Eötvös Loránd University also found here.

One of the latest tenants is Siemens in its 2020 new 22,000 sqm complex, which deals with industrial software development in the fields of automation technology, integrated propulsion controls, medical imaging, electric vehicles and energy technology.

== See also ==
- List of technology centers
- List of research parks
- Research-intensive clusters
