= Poznan Science and Technology Park =

Coordinates: 52°27′17.87″N 16°57′13.69″E

Poznan Science and Technology Park (Polish: Poznański Park Naukowo-Technologiczny) (PPNT), founded in 1995, is the first Science and Technology Park of its kind in Poland. According to Polish publication Money.pl, in 2010 it was selected as the best technology park in Poland.

It is located in the north district of Poznań (Wielkopolska region), Naramowice. A non-profit managed by the Adam Mickiewicz University Foundation, it is intended to support science and industry by such services as conducting research, offering technological consultations, training small and medium-sized enterprises, and offering guidance on technology transfer and international co-operation. It also offers rental space, with 5.4 hectares (13 acres) and over 11,000 square metres (120,000 sq ft) of buildings with office, storage, and laboratories hosting about 50 active tenants, including representatives of chemistry, biotechnology, IT, ICT and telecommunication.

== History ==
Founded in 1995 by the Adam Mickiewicz University Foundation, the Poznan Science and Technology Park was the first science and technology park to operate under market conditions in Poland. Intended to foster business and increase ties between local business and the university, PPNT initially struggled with its goal, with 2003's The Human Geography of East Central Europe characterizing their results as "somewhat disappointing." However, the park continued its own development, receiving significant public funding and expanding in size and services until, according to Polish publication Money.pl, in 2010 it was selected as the best technology park in Poland.

== Goals ==
PPNT is focused on the incubation of start-ups and technology companies, support and promotion of innovation and innovative companies, co-operation of science and business, research on new technologies and their improvement, conversion of scientific results into technological innovations and participation in the economical development of the region by encouraging entrepreneurs.

== International cooperation ==
PSTP participates in many international project and networks, which include Regional Contact Point for 7 Framework EU Program and Technology Transfer Department which is a member of Enterprise Europe Network. PSTP is also a member of International Association of Science Parks (IASP). Poznan Science and Technology Park is also active in domestic and regional cooperation with other science parks, local government institutions, business support organisations, universities innovation and technology transfer centres and cooperation chambers.

== Research services ==
PPNT offers many research services for science, economy and companies delivered by its research centres:

- Centre of Advanced Chemical Technology
- Chemical Technology Incubator
- Analytical Laboratory
- Poznan Radiocarbon Laboratory 14C
- Archaeology Rescue Research Centre
- Centre of Information Technologies
- Centre of Analysis and Medical Diagnostics
- Isotopic Laboratory
- Speech and Language Technology Laboratory
- The Center for Optics and Optometry
- Waste Management Centre
