= Ideon Science Park =

Science park in Lund, Sweden

Coordinates: 55.7139°N 13.2167°E

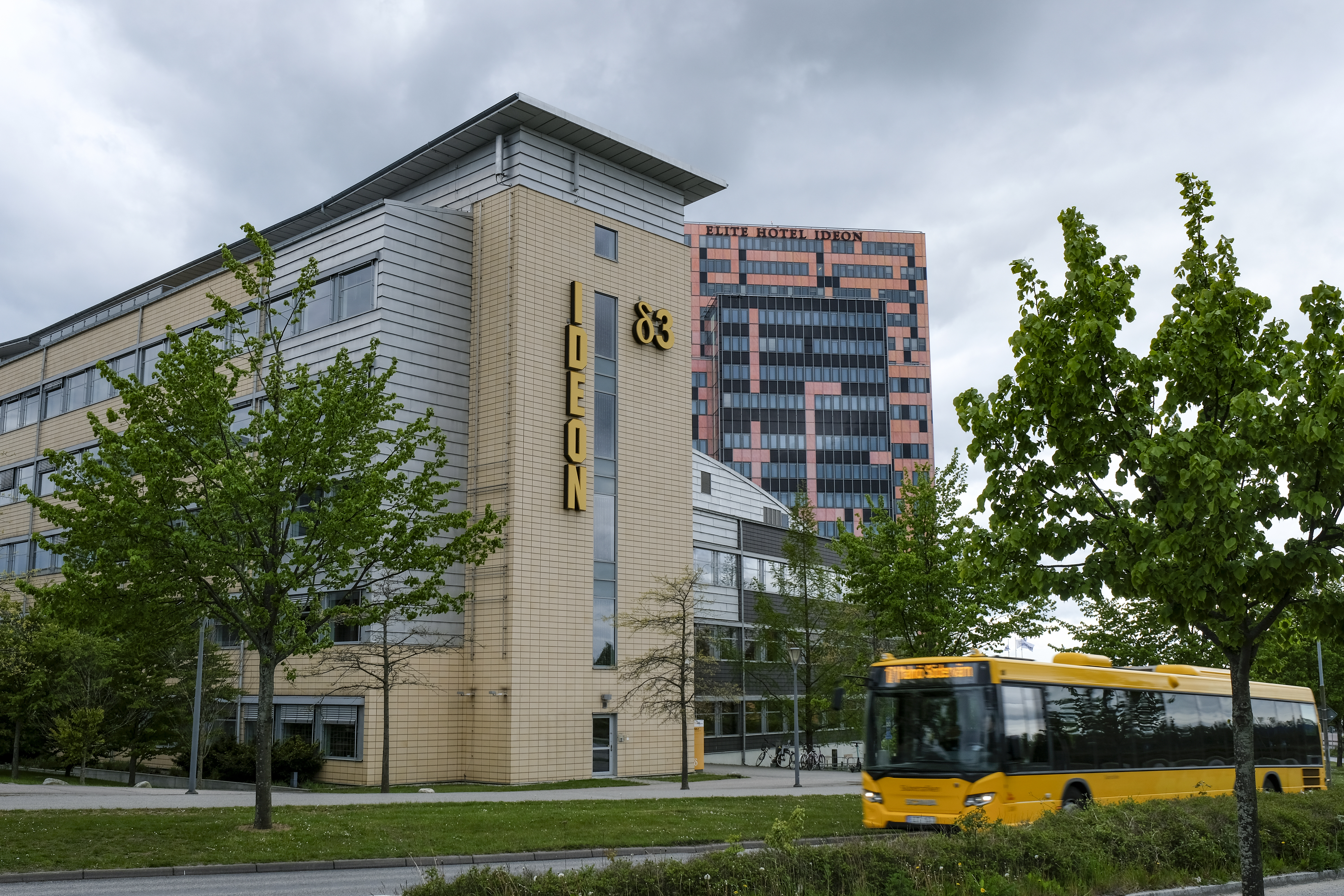
- Part of Ideon Science Park
- Interactive map of Ideon Science Park
- Location: Lund, Sweden
- Opening date: 2011
- Website: www.ideon.se

Ideon Science Park in Lund is the oldest and largest, and one of the best-known, science parks in Sweden. In 2019, it became the first UN-certified science park in the world. There are about 245,000 m^{2} (2,640,000 sq ft) of office and laboratory space in more than 17 buildings.

Ideon Science Park is part of the Medicon Valley life-science cluster.

Bluetooth was created in Ideon Science Park.

St Ericsson, Sony, Ericsson, Axis Communications, Active Biotech and Gambro all have their development centres right beside the park, and Mblox have one of their two Swedish offices here, with the other in Stockholm.

The development of Ideon came as a result of the 1970s restructuring in the Skåne business community. Ideon was founded in 1983 as a collaboration between Lund University, the then Malmöhus county, Lund municipality and the business community.
