= Coimbra iParque =

Science and technology park in Portugal

The Coimbra Innovation Park (iParque) is a science and technology park located in Coimbra, Portugal. The park was projected with 150,000 square meters of industrial sites intended for development and 700 square meters of office space. Additional facilities such as a data center, several conference halls and meeting rooms of different sizes, a restaurant and a green park were in the initial plans. The park was also intended to offer a range of specialized services to support business development, internationalization and establishment of foreign companies.

== History and mission ==
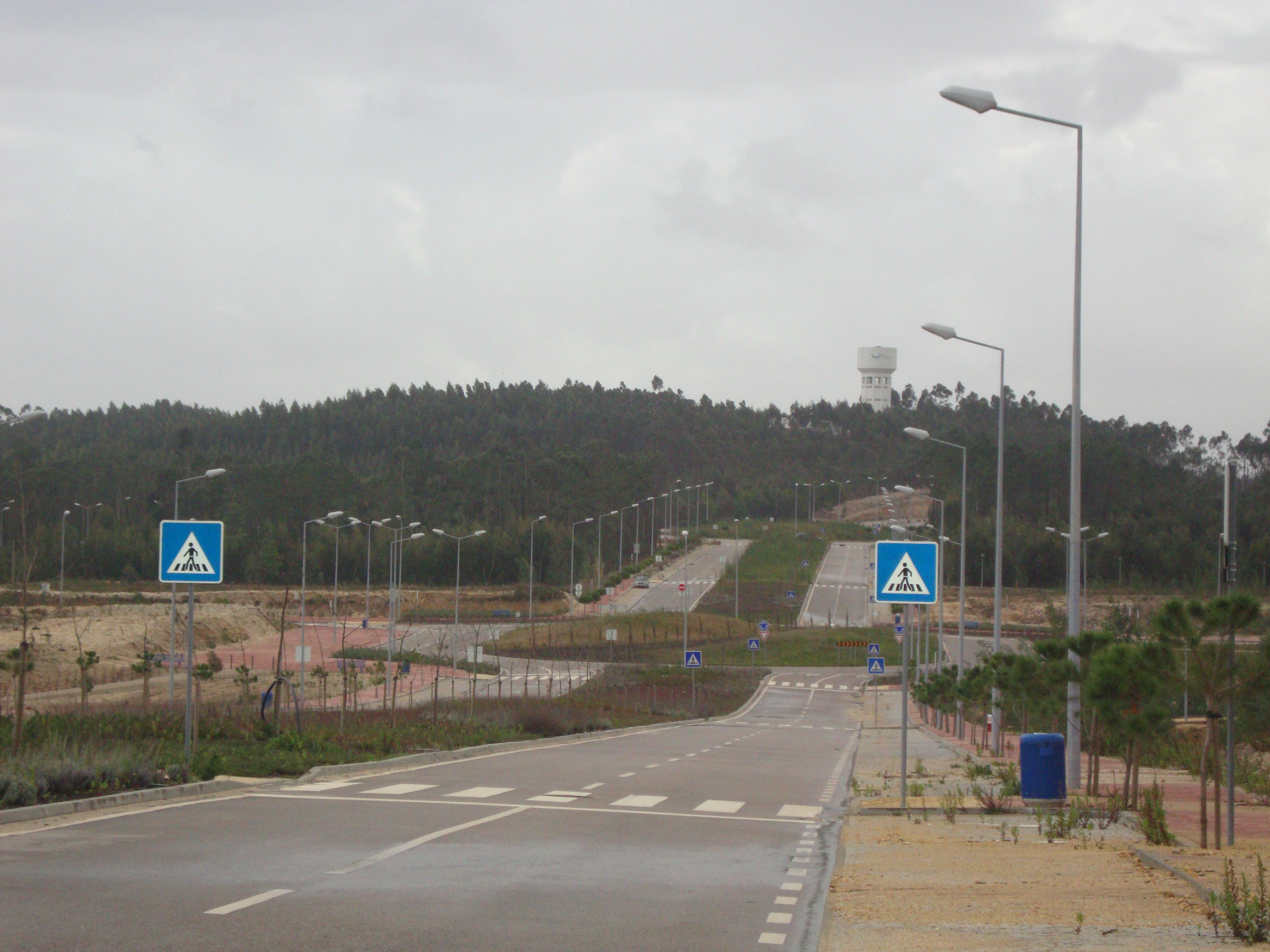
Coimbra iParque science park site in January 2011.

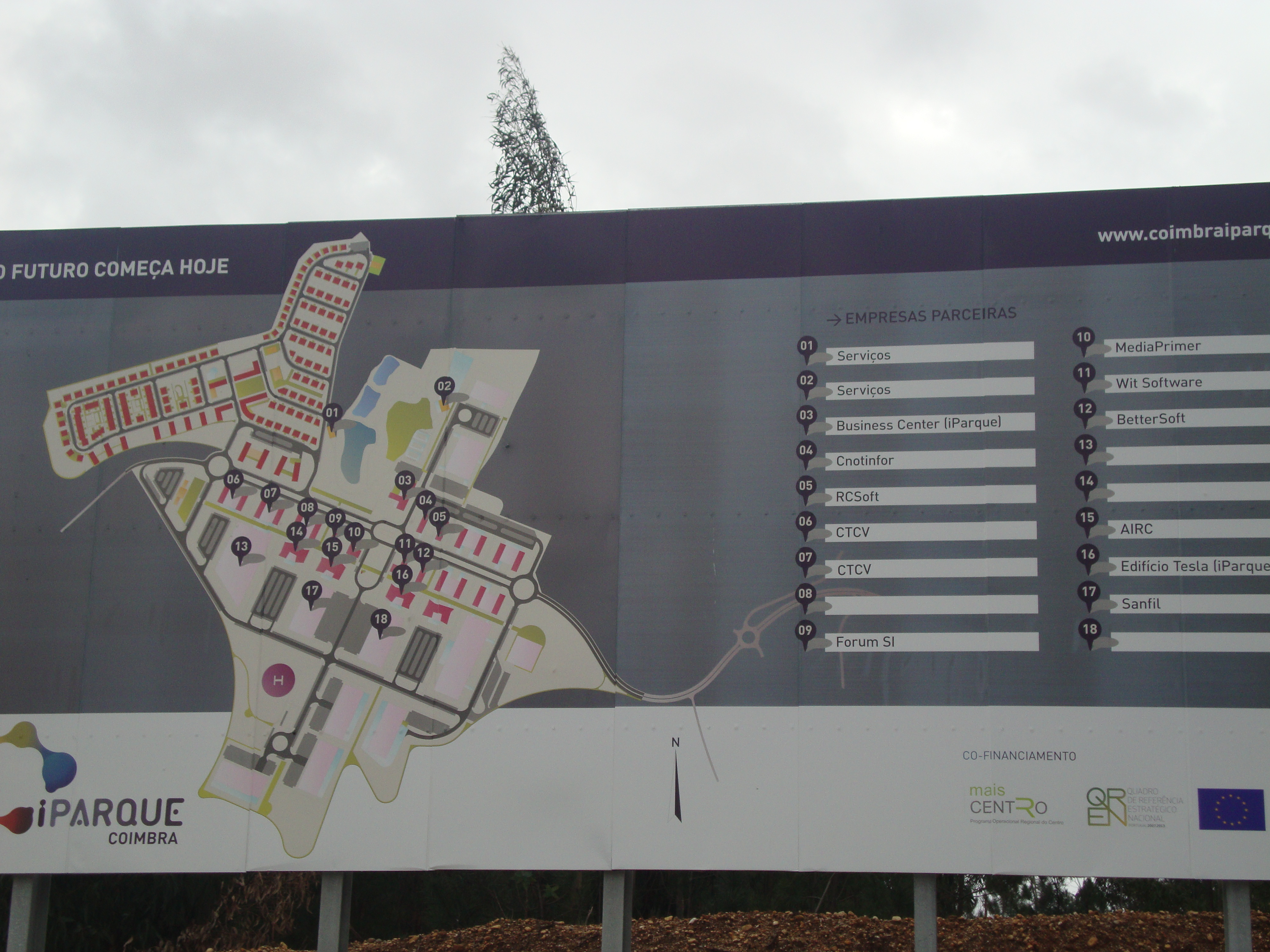
Outdoor in the Coimbra iParque showing the planned project.

Coimbra has good educational, scientific and technological facilities in a number of fields due to its ancient university - the University of Coimbra. Within Portugal, the Coimbra region has a number of incubation initiatives that serve both companies and ideas, a wide range of R&D groups and centres, as well as some successful innovative companies. The Coimbra iParque was founded in order to connect these initiatives and businesses and work with them, establishing cooperation networks, creating synergies and competitive advantages.

Coimbra iParque mission was to develop and modernize Coimbra as well as the region's economical activity by promoting, creating and settling companies with a high technological content and by aiming towards innovation, experimental development and the use of new technologies in advising or training actions. It intended to create a new concept of competition based on the collective efforts of a number of institutional initiatives that were credible and promote the attraction of highly educated human resources and investment, turning Coimbra into a new technology-based business hub on par with some of the most innovative and entrepreneurial small and mid-sized European university towns (i.e. Leiden, Leuven, Lund, Turku or Uppsala to name a few).

The area was woodland and many private owners were forcibly expropriated by the municipality in order to build the park. The construction of the park was concluded in 2010, around the time that the Portuguese Republic requested a financial bailout. In spite of that, a few businesses started operations in the park immediately. Between 2011 and 2017, the park became the headquarters of a small number of companies and applied research centers with expertise in the fields of ICT, health, nanotech, cleantech and green building. A second development phase – consisting of an additional 200,000 square meters of industrial sites and 3,500 square meters of office space was approved, so there was plenty of space for expansion. This second phase also included dedicated areas for housing, shopping, green parks and sports facilities. As of 2018, most of the park remained largely undeveloped in such a way that all the site looked like a ghost town. Some people of Coimbra area used the infrastructure available for jogging, hiking, biking, dog walking and even street racing.
