= VEGA (technology park) =

Science and technology park in Venice, Italy

Coordinates: 45.472°N 12.254°E

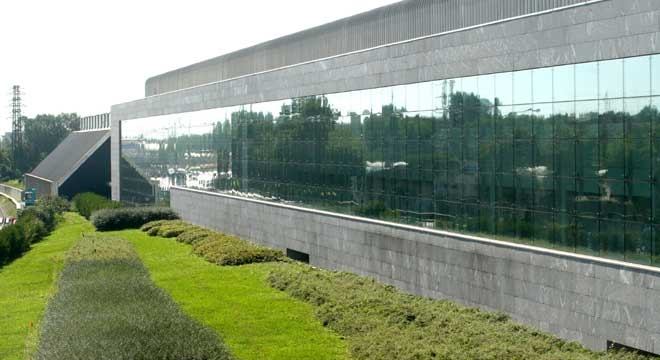
The Pegaso building at VEGA

VEGA (Venice Gateway for Science and Technology) is an Italian science and technology park located in Marghera, within the municipality of Venice, Veneto. Established in 1993 in the former industrial area of Porto Marghera, the park was developed to support scientific research, technology transfer, business incubation and the redevelopment of former industrial land.

The park accommodates businesses and research organisations working in fields including information and communications technology (ICT), the green economy, environmental sustainability and industrial design. Its activities have involved cooperation with Ca' Foscari University of Venice, Università Iuav di Venezia and other research and industrial organisations.

VEGA was established as a non-profit limited-liability consortium company (società consortile a responsabilità limitata). The company entered an Italian court-supervised arrangement with creditors in 2013–2014 and was placed into liquidation in October 2024, while the park's property management activities continued.

== History ==
=== Establishment and industrial redevelopment ===
VEGA was founded on 27 October 1993 in the industrial district of Porto Marghera, approximately 5 km (3.1 mi) from the historic centre of Venice. The site had previously been occupied by facilities associated with Enichem Agricoltura, which produced chemical fertilisers in Porto Marghera until 1986.

The consortium was established by 34 public and private shareholders, including the Municipality of Venice, regional innovation organisations, the then Province of Venice, Ca' Foscari University and Iuav University. Its purpose was to facilitate the conversion of former industrial land into facilities for scientific research, technological development and business services.

The project received support from European funding programmes intended for the redevelopment of industrial areas experiencing economic decline. These funds contributed to environmental remediation and the construction and refurbishment of buildings for research and business activities.

The broader development plan designated approximately 35 ha (86 acres) of the former industrial district for the science and technology park. During its early development, VEGA promoted the conversion of industrial land into offices, laboratories and facilities for high-technology companies.

The redevelopment formed part of wider efforts to diversify the economic activities of Porto Marghera, an industrial area historically associated with chemicals, energy production and heavy industry.

=== Business incubation and research activities ===
On 2 July 2012, VEGA established VEGAinCUBE, a business incubator intended to support innovative startups and university spin-offs. In 2013, it obtained certification as an innovative startup incubator from the Italian Ministry of Economic Development.

The incubator offered workspaces, business support and access to research and technological networks. Its activities focused particularly on ICT, the green economy, design and multimedia technologies.

In 2015, VEGAinCUBE was reported to accommodate 23 startups developing technologically innovative products and services.

=== Climate research centre ===
In April 2018, VEGA became the location of CMCC@Ca'Foscari, a research centre established through a partnership between Ca' Foscari University of Venice and the Euro-Mediterranean Center on Climate Change (CMCC).

The centre brought together researchers from disciplines including climatology, economics, chemistry and statistics. Its work focuses on the interactions between the climate, environment, economy and society, with particular attention to scientific research supporting climate-related public policy.

=== Financial restructuring and liquidation ===
On 29 July 2013, the company managing VEGA applied for a court-supervised composition with creditors (concordato preventivo) before the Tribunal of Venice. The court approved a restructuring arrangement in July 2014, and a judicial liquidator was appointed to oversee the disposal of assets under the agreed plan.

On 30 September 2024, the shareholders resolved to dissolve the company and place it into liquidation after its capital fell below the statutory minimum. The liquidation took legal effect on 17 October 2024 and continued alongside the existing creditor arrangement.

The liquidation provided for the continuation of operational management of the company's properties, with the stated purpose of maintaining their functionality and allowing the businesses occupying them to remain during the asset-disposal process.

In 2025 and 2026, further competitive procedures were conducted for the sale of properties associated with the park. In October 2026, VEGA announced the provisional award of an aggregated property lot for €4 million.

== Facilities and activities ==
VEGA occupies part of the former industrial area of Porto Marghera. The development includes office buildings, facilities for companies and research organisations, laboratories and spaces intended for business incubation.

A 2014 account of the park described an operational area of approximately 26 ha (64 acres), accommodating around 200 companies and 2,000 workers. These figures describe the park's earlier development and are not necessarily representative of its present size or occupancy.

The organisations based at VEGA have been involved in fields including ICT, environmental technologies, the green economy, cultural heritage and design. The park has provided facilities for businesses and promoted links between companies, universities and research organisations.

VEGA has also participated in the network of the Italian Association of Science and Technology Parks (Associazione Parchi Scientifici e Tecnologici Italiani, APSTI). Its institutional relationships have included cooperation with Ca' Foscari University, Iuav University and other research organisations.

Among the organisations listed at the park are CMCC@Ca'Foscari, Ca' Foscari Challenge School and companies involved in engineering, information technology and environmental services.

== Gallery ==
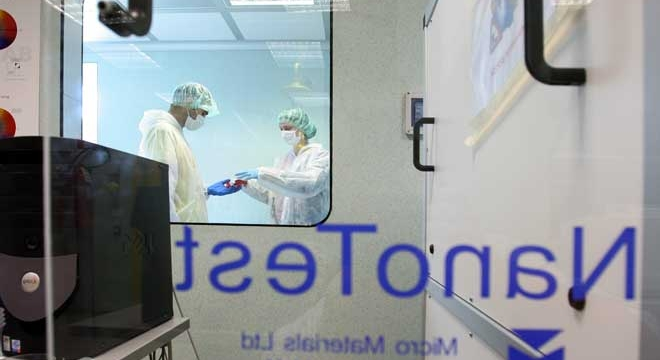
Nanofab research facility

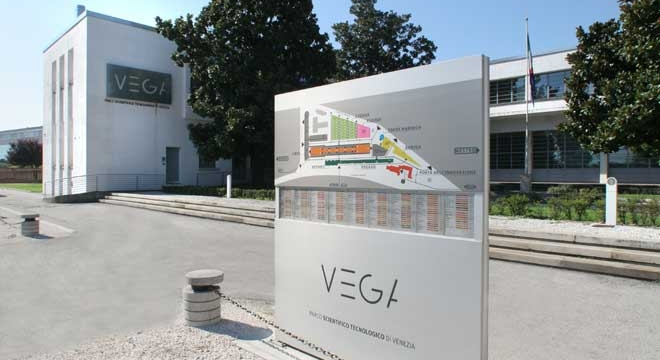
Porta dell'Innovazione building

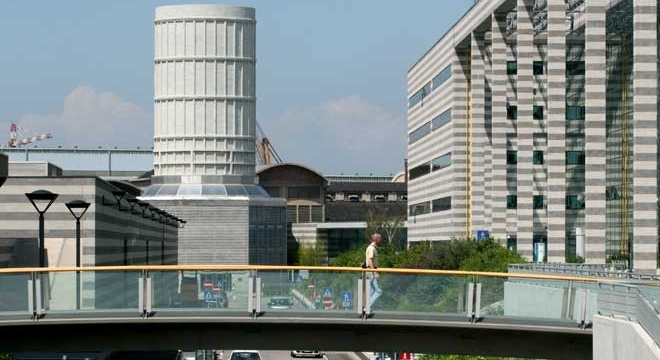
View of the Lybra building

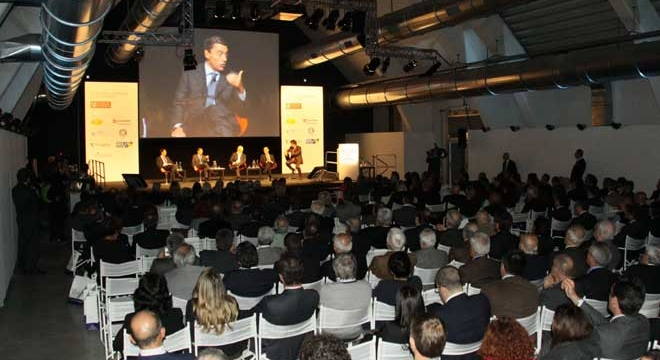
Antares building

== See also ==
- Science park
- Technology transfer
- Business incubator
- Porto Marghera
- List of science and technology parks in Italy
- Euro-Mediterranean Center on Climate Change
