= South Dakota State University Innovation Campus =

Innovation Campus

Coordinates: 44°19′14″N 96°45′52″W

The South Dakota State Innovation Campus in Brookings, South Dakota was founded in 2006 and is the first research park located in South Dakota. The Innovation Campus aims to foster collaboration and partnerships between South Dakota State University, business, industry and government.

The park covers 125 acres (0.51 km^{2}) and is adjacent to Interstate 29 and US Highway 14 Bypass. The first building at the Innovation Campus, the Innovation Center, is a 28,000-square-foot (2,600 m^{2}) multi-tenant/incubator building. A second building, The Seed Technology Laboratory, will be completed in July 2010.
