= Dioxide Materials =

Chemical company in Boca Raton - Florida, United States

- Dioxide Materials logo
- Type: Private
- Industry: Chemical industry
- Genre: Carbon capture and storage, Ion-exchange membranes
- Founded: September 9, 2009; 17 years ago in Champaign, Illinois, US
- Headquarters: Boca Raton, Florida, US
- Products: Sustainion Alkaline Ionomers and Alkaline Ion Exchange Membranes, Carbon Dioxide and Water Electrolyzers
- Website: dioxidematerials.com

Dioxide Materials was founded in 2009 in Champaign, Illinois, and is now headquartered in Boca Raton, Florida. Its main business is to develop technology to lower the world's carbon footprint. Dioxide Materials is developing technology to convert carbon dioxide, water and renewable energy into carbon-neutral gasoline (petrol) or jet fuel. Applications include CO_{2} recycling, sustainable fuels production and reducing curtailment of renewable energy(i.e. renewable energy that could not be used by the grid).

== Carbon Dioxide Electrolyzer Technology ==
Carbon Dioxide electrolyzers are a major part of Dioxide Materials' business. The work started in response to a Department of Energy challenge to find better catalysts for electrochemical reduction of carbon dioxide. At the time the overpotential (i.e. wasted voltage) was too high, and the rate too low for practical applications. Workers at Dioxide Materials theorized that a bifunctional catalyst consisting of a metal and an ionic liquid might lower the overpotential for electrochemical reduction of carbon dioxide. Indeed, it was found that the combination of two catalysts, silver nanoparticles and an ionic liquid solution containing equal volumes of 1-ethyl-3-methylimidazolium tetrafluoroborate (EMIM-BF4) and water, reduced the overpotential for CO_{2} conversion to carbon monoxide (CO) from about 1 volt to only 0.17 volts. Workers from other laboratories have subsequently reproduced the findings on many metals, and with several ionic liquids. Dioxide Materials has shown that a similar enhancement occurs during alkaline water electrolysis and the hydrocarboxylation of acetylene ("Reppe chemistry").

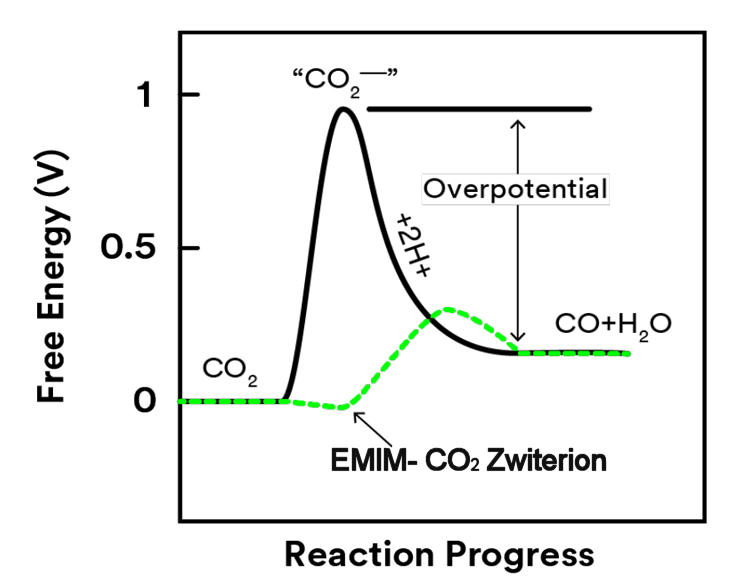
Dioxide Materials' proposed reaction pathway for CO_{2} electrolysis on silver in the presence (green) and absence (black) of EMIM

At this point, there is still some question about how the imidazolium is able to lower the overpotential for the electrochemical reduction of carbon dioxide. The first step in the electrolysis of CO_{2} is the addition of an electron into the CO_{2} or a molecular complex containing CO_{2}. The resultant species is labeled "CO_{2}¯" in the figure on the left. It requires at least an electron-volt of energy per molecule to form the species in the absence of the ionic liquid. That electron-volt of energy is largely wasted during the reaction. Rosen at al postulated that a new complex forms in presence of the ionic liquid so that 1 eV of energy is not wasted. The complex allows the reaction to follow the green pathway on the figure on the right. Recent work suggests that the new complex is a zwitterion Other possible pathways (i.e. non-zwitterions) are discussed in Keith et al. Rosen at al. Verdaguer-Casadevall et al. and Shi et al.

== Sustainion Membranes ==
The structure of Sustainion 37

Unfortunately, ionic liquids were found to be too corrosive to be used in practical carbon dioxide electrolyzers. Ionic liquids are strong solvents. They dissolve/corrode the seals, carbon electrodes and other parts in commercial electrolyzers. As a result, they were difficult to be used in practice.

In order to avoid the corrosion, Dioxide Materials switched from ionic liquid catalysts to catalytic anion exchange polymers. A number of polymers were tested and the imidazolium functionalized styrene polymer shown in the figure on the right showed the best performance. The membranes were trade named Sustainion. The use of Sustainion membranes raised the current and lifetime of the CO_{2} electrolyzer into the commercially useful range. Sustainion membranes have shown conductivities above 100 mS/cm under alkaline conditions at 60 °C, stability for thousands of hours in 1M KOH, and offer a physical mechanical stability that is useful for many different applications. The membranes showed a lifetime over 3000 hours in CO_{2} electrolyzers at high current densities. More recent research has noted that a cell membrane that has an optimized cathode has the capability of running for up to 158 days at 200 mA/cm^{2}.
