= DTU Science Park =

Hørsholm science park, part of the Technical University of Denmark

Coordinates: 55.872461°N 12.491654°E

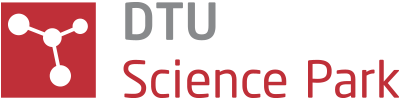
- Formation: 1962
- Legal status: Science park
- Purpose: Tech innovation
- Location: Hørsholm, Lyngby, Denmark
- Region served: Denmark
- Members: deep tech, cleantech, biotech, medico og IKT companies
- CEO: Steen Donner
- Parent organization: Technical University of Denmark
- Website: dtusciencepark.dk

DTU Science Park (previously Scion DTU) is a science park in Hørsholm north of Copenhagen, Denmark. The park is administratively part of the Technical University of Denmark (DTU) in Kongens Lyngby, and it also comprise premises at DTU's main campus there. DTU Science Park hosts more than 260 companies and organisations.

DTU Science Park hosts a deep tech community in Denmark. Deep tech is characterized by a long time-to-market, high capital intensity, and technology risk and complexity.

== History ==
The science park was originally established by the Technological-Scientific Research Council of Denmark on 12 December 1962. The architectural masterplan for the development of the science park was designed by Arne Jacobsen. In 2004, Forskningscentret merged with DTU.

== Facilities and companies ==
DTU Science Park comprises approximately 180,000 square metres of floorspace and house more than 260 companies. Tenants have access to various high tech facilities and laboratories as well as business and innovation consultants and other shared services.

Companies based at DTU Science Park include both start-ups and divisions of global corporations. Among the companies based in the science park in Hørsholm are Chr. Hansen and ALK-Abello. In 2014, Chinese Shandong Longlive Bio-technology Co., producer of 2nd generation bioethanol, opened its first R&D centre outside China at DTU Science Park in Hørsholm. In 2015, FMC Corporation decided to place its European operations at DTU Science Park. FMC European Innovation Center opened in 2016.

Some of the other companies and organisations hosted by DTU Science Park includes:

- 1st Mile
- ArtScience
- Bavarian Nordic
- Bitdefender
- Cortex Technology
- Danfoss
- Danish Waste Solutions
- Navitas Life Science
- Odeon
- Particle Analytical
- Siemens
- Visiopharm

== See also ==
- Medicon Valley
