= 4Ocean =

American apparel company focused on ocean cleanup

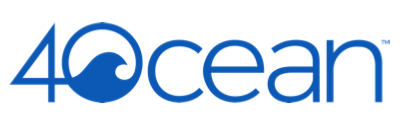
- Type: Private
- Industry: Clothing; Environmentalism
- Founded: January 2017; 9 years ago
- Founders: Alex Schulze; Andrew Cooper
- Headquarters: Boca Raton, Florida, United States
- Products: Bracelets, water bottles, clothing
- Number of employees: ▲250 (2021)
- Website: www.4ocean.com

4Ocean is a for-profit company founded in Boca Raton, Florida, in 2017. 4Ocean retails bracelets made from recycled materials, as well as apparel and other merchandise for which the materials are environmentally- and socially responsibly sourced.

Although 4Ocean is a for-profit company, they are also a certified B Corporation, a private certification of social and environmental performance for for-profit companies.

The company uses a portion of the profits generated by bracelet sales to remove one pound of trash from the ocean and coastlines as part of efforts to eliminate plastic pollution in oceans. 4Ocean has cleanup operations based in Florida, Haiti and Bali, and has organised volunteer cleanup events in a number of countries. The company has a "One Pound Promise", which promises that, at a minimum, one pound of ocean waste is removed per item sold.

== History ==
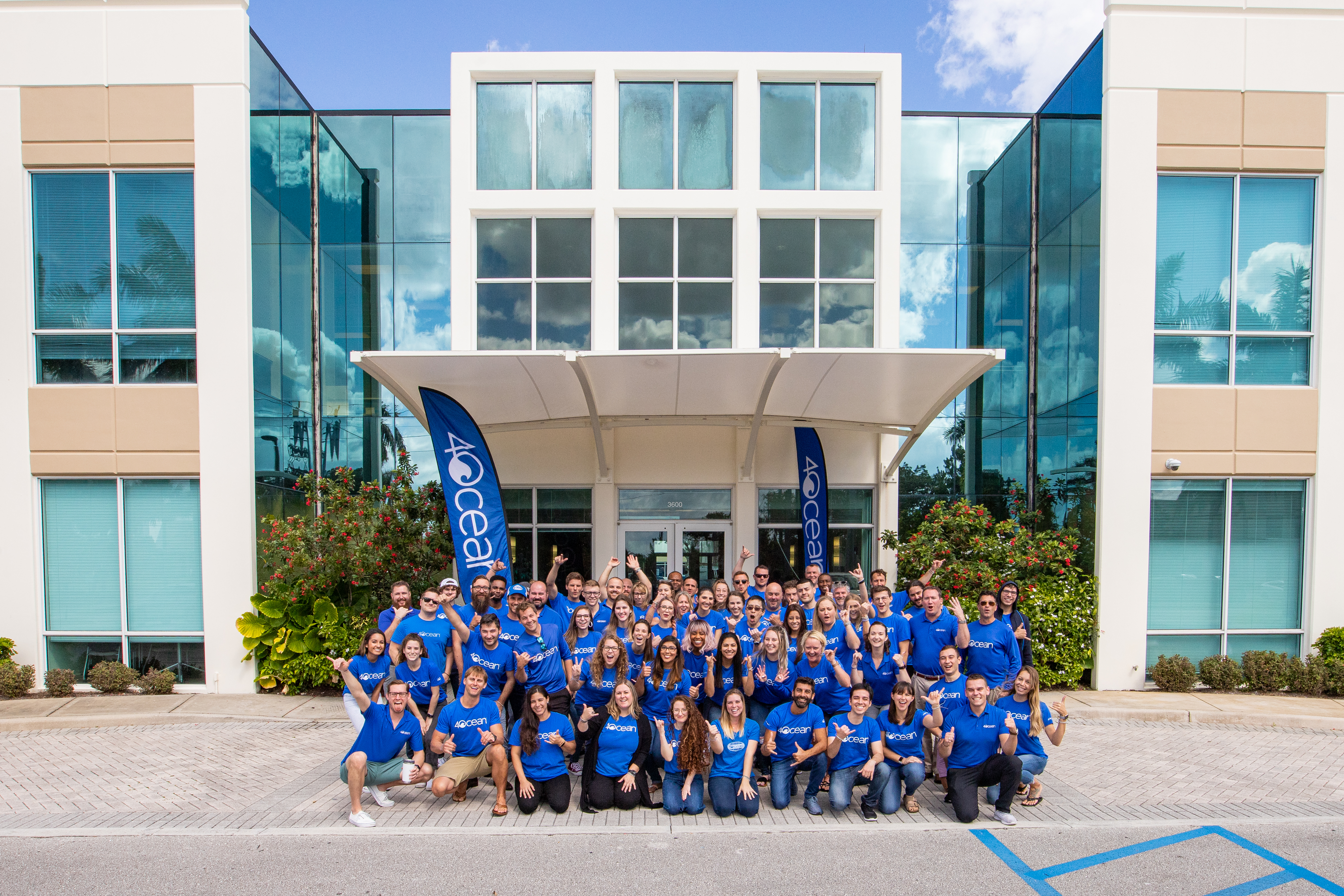
Company headquarters located at FAU Research Park.

4Ocean was founded by Alex Schulze and Andrew Cooper, who, on a trip to Bali, Indonesia, noticed the beaches were filled with plastic waste; Schulze and Cooper witnessed fishermen pushing their boats through mounds of plastic in order to get to more open waters. Upon learning that plastic waste accumulated on the province's coastlines due to the currents of the ocean, they began to explore ideas of widespread cleanup operations.

Schulze and Cooper created a business model that allowed for volunteers to have access to the supplies and resources necessary for the retraction and disposal of waste found in the water and along coastlines.

As of 2026, 4Ocean claims to have removed over 50 million pounds of waste from various oceans and coastlines since its inception. As of January 2019, over 200 people were employed by the company. A transparency disclosure released through the B Corporation indicated that in 2020, due to the COVID-19 pandemic, the company laid off 136 of its 179 employees.

== Business model ==
4Ocean is a commercial for-profit business that is funded by the sales of its online products. These funds are distributed to fund cleanup operations and provide deep-sea cleaning equipment. For every $20 of turnover, 4Ocean claims its employees recover one pound of plastic waste from oceans and coastlines.

Partnerships with industry have led to some companies becoming plastic neutral through offsets provided through 4Ocean. Another source of revenue for the organization is the sales of the recycled plastic into products by companies that partner with the organization.

In November 2019, Business Insider reported that the advertising archive of Facebook showed 4Ocean had purchased 4,290 adverts, spending $3,654,791, making them the 14th-largest purchaser of political, electoral or issue-focused adverts on the platform.

== Awards ==
- 4Ocean won the Surfer magazine "Agent of Change Award".
- The founders of 4Ocean were named in the Forbes magazine "30 Under 30 — Social Entrepreneurs 2019" List.
- The founders of 4ocean were named to the "201 Creative Class" by Newsweek.

== See also ==
- Marine pollution
- Microplastics
- Plastic pollution
- Sustainability
- The Ocean Cleanup
