= Medicines Discovery Catapult =

Medicine research and innovation centre

The Medicines Discovery Catapult (MDC) is the United Kingdom's catapult centre for medicine research and innovation, headquartered at Alderley Park in Cheshire.

== History ==
The intention to form the company was announced by the Chancellor on 13 July 2015 with funding of £5m, on a visit to Cheshire. It would be part of the Northern Powerhouse initiative.

The Medicines Technologies Catapult was established in December 2015, funded by a £10m grant from Innovate UK and based at the Alderley Park science park in Cheshire. On 1 March 2016 its name changed to the Medicines Discovery Catapult. Further funding of approximately £10m per year was secured from Innovate UK for the years 2018 to 2023.

=== Precision Medicine Catapult ===
The PMC was based in Cambridge and had regional centres of excellence at Belfast, Glasgow, Cardiff, Oxford, Leeds and Manchester. It worked with precision medicine. It started from April 2015, and worked with regional parts of the Diagnostic Evidence Cooperative and Academic Health Science Networks (AHSN).

On 26 June 2017 it was announced that the PMC would close, with most of its functions transferred to the MDC. The Leeds site is now the Leeds Centre for Personalised Medicine and Health.

== Activities ==
A not-for-profit company, the MDC works with a range of UK innovators to advance projects and products towards clinical impact. In 2019, the company stated that it worked in four sectors:

- Predictive biological models of human disease, for new drug testing
- Predictive computational techniques for drug discovery
- Collaboration between health service providers and government bodies
- Collaboration on drug discovery between research charities and industry.

In the same year, the number of staff increased from 40 to 75, and the company reported that its income comprised £8.5m from Innovate UK and £152,000 from collaborative research and development. After charging £7.1m to administrative expenses, the company reported a loss for the year of £16,000.

In 2020, the company was given the task of setting up one of the first PCR analysis centres for COVID-19 tests – known as Lighthouse labs – elsewhere at the Alderley Park site. By 2021, this centre employed over 700 staff and had a stated capacity of 80,000 test samples per day.

== Key people ==
Dr Robin Brown has been the company's chairman since July 2018; he has a PhD in molecular biology and has worked in venture capital at Advent Healthcare. The company has no shareholders.

Previously, Professor Graham Boulnois was chairman from January 2016; he was head of research from 1992 to 2000 at Zeneca Pharmaceuticals in Cheshire, and Professor of Microbiology from 1984 to 1992 at the University of Leicester.

== See also ==
- Innovative Medicines Initiative, OpenPHACTS and European Lead Factory
