= Filtronic =

UK technology company

- Company type: Public
- Traded as: LSE: FTC
- Industry: RF and microwave subsystems, telecommunications, critical communications
- Founded: 1977
- Headquarters: NETPark, County Durham; Leeds; Manchester; Salisbury, MD
- Key people: Nat Edington (CEO); Michael Tyerman (CFO); Jonathan Neale (Chairman)
- Products: Millimeter-wave transceivers, tower-mounted amplifiers
- Website: filtronic.com

Filtronic is a UK public limited company (PLC) that is AIM-listed on the London Stock Exchange (FTC.L). It is a designer and manufacturer of RF, microwave, and millimeter-wave (mmWave) components and subsystems for applications in telecommunications, defence, space and transport. It is headquartered at NETPark in County Durham with other facilities in Leeds, Manchester and Cambridge and a US manufacturing site in Salisbury, MD.

Filtronic was awarded a 2021 Queen's Award for Enterprise, International Trade, in recognition of its "Outstanding Short Term Growth in overseas sales over the last three years", which had grown by 208% over the period 2018 to 2021.

In November 2021 former McLaren F1 executive Jonathan Neale was appointed as Non-Executive Chairman of Filtronic, to replace Reg Gott.

== History ==
Filtronic was founded in 1977 by Professor John David Rhodes, who was a lecturer in the Department of Electrical and Electronic Engineering at the University of Leeds. He started the company to design electronic filters for the Panavia Tornado aircraft, which were then manufactured by Ferranti. Initial funding for Filtronic was mainly from research contracts with the European Space Agency for satellite borne filters, and from selling software for the design of multiplexers.

Throughout its early years Filtronic continued to enjoy a close affiliation with the University, and in 2004 was said to be the most successful company ever to be spun out of a UK university. When Professor Rhodes received the Royal Academy of Engineering's highest award, the Prince Philip Medal in 2003, the citation read: "In recognition for his outstanding research expertise in communications technology which he developed into a highly successful world-wide company". Since founding Filtronic, Rhodes also received the Order of the British Empire (OBE) in 1992 and was made Commander of the Order of the British Empire (CBE) in the 2000 New Year's Honours with the citation "For services to Engineering Research and to Industry". The company's markets remained entirely in electronic warfare until 1989.

In 1985 Filtronic Components received a Queen's Award for Technology for the development of suspended substrate stripline microwave filters and multiplexers. In 1986 the company was becoming too large for a single management unit, and was split into three divisions - subsystems, components and special systems, and in 1989 it established a wireless infrastructure division. This heralded a period of significant change for the company, and in 1992 Filtronic Comtek was formed to take advantage of the growing international market for mobile communications, in particular for the new digital 2G GSM (Global Systems for Mobile Communications) standard.

=== Public company ===
In October 1994 Filtronic Comtek plc was floated on the London Stock Exchange. This created a period of significant growth, with joint ventures opening in Scotland, Australia and China.

In 1998 Filtronic made three acquisitions: Sage Laboratories Inc. (US); Litton Solid State Subsystems Inc. (US); and LK-Products from Nokia in Finland. Other acquisitions around this time included KW Engineering and Sigtek Inc. (both US). Professor Christopher Snowden was appointed as Executive Director of Technology in 1998, and he was subsequently appointed joint CEO (alongside Professor Rhodes) of Filtronic plc in 1999.

=== Filtronic compound semiconductors ===
In 1999 Filtronic purchased the former Fujitsu semiconductor plant in Newton Aycliffe, County Durham, with the aim of converting the silicon DRAM fab to produce monolithic microwave integrated circuits (MMIC) on 6-inch GaAs (gallium arsenide) wafers. On 1 September 1999, the 29,000 m^{2} facility and 43 hectare site was acquired from Fujitsu Ltd for £13.5m, and the operation was renamed Filtronic Compound Semiconductors. Christopher Snowden became CEO of Filtronic Compound Semiconductors in 2001.

=== Reorganisation and divestments ===
During the telecoms boom, Filtronic's market capitalisation had grown to £1bn by 2000. The company's annual sales peaked at £435 million in 2004. However, the slow-down and crash that followed the telecoms boom exposed Filtronic, and its market capitalisation dropped below £100 million.

In 2005, having re-organised into three business divisions in 2003, Filtronic completed the sale of its Handsets Products division to Technitrol Inc. for $83 million. In March 2006 the Sigtek and Sage Laboratories groups were merged to form Filtronic Signal Solutions, Inc., headquartered in Columbia, MD. In October 2006 Filtronic completed the sale of the filter based transmit-receive module and power amplifier business of its Wireless Infrastructure Division to Powerwave Technologies Inc. In 2008 Filtronic sold its Compound Semiconductor business to RFMD (now Qorvo), and its defence business to Teledyne Ltd. Other notable transactions during this period included the acquisition in 2010 of Isotek Holdings Ltd, providing Filtronic with a range of filters and base station equipment products predominantly in the public safety and critical communications market. The company was then re-organised into two divisions, Filtronic Broadband and Filtronic Wireless.

In 2013 Filtronic received a significant order valued at £14 million for interference mitigation filters to protect television sets from interference when the 4G LTE mobile phone network was rolled out across the UK. The company moved in 2014 to NETpark, a science park in Sedgefield, County Durham, where it has invested in expanding its manufacturing facilities to increase manufacturing capacity, as well as extend its ability to offer contract manufacturing services.

The company moved from the main market of the London Stock Exchange to AIM in 2015. In January 2020 Filtronic completed the sale of its telecom antenna business (Filtronic Wireless) in Sweden to Microdata Telecom Innovation Stockholm AB, now Kaelus.

=== Regional influence ===
The growth of Filtronic's influence is credited with seeding a cluster of specialist microwave companies based in the north and the northeast of England, in the counties of Yorkshire and Durham. A number of companies have grown up in the area with roots connected to Filtronic, including four organisations based in Shipley, Yorkshire: Radio Design; Slipstream Design; Teledyne Defence & Space; and Diamond Microwave. Both of the co-founders of Viper RF in Newton Aycliffe, County Durham, also formerly worked for Filtronic Compound Semiconductors.

== Grants ==
Filtronic has been the recipient of a number of UK Government-funded research grants from UK Research and Innovation through Innovate UK. In November 2020 Filtronic received a capital grant of £150,000 from the County Durham Growth Fund to contribute towards a major expansion project. The company used the money to supplement its own £1m investment in the expansion project, which involved extending manufacturing and testing facilities as well as create up to 36 new jobs, with the aim of increasing capacity significantly and winning contracts with new customers.

Filtronic was one of the participants in the DLINK project, which received more than £850,000 funding in 2019 from the Engineering and Physical Sciences Research Council. DLINK was a collaboration between Lancaster University and Glasgow University along with major industrial partners and advisors including BT, Nokia Bell Labs, IQE, Filtronic, Optocap and Teledyne e2v, and has Intel on its advisory board. DLINK aimed to provide communication links with around 45 Gbit/s data rate and a transmission distance of over 1km using D-band spectrum in the range 151 - 174.8 GHz.

== Mentions in Parliament ==
In 2020 - 2021, Filtronic was mentioned several times in the UK House of Commons in the context of its importance in the UK's telecommunications ecosystem and its role in helping to strengthen mobile communications network resilience. Filtronic was also mentioned by Mavenir in its October 2020 written submission to Parliament, in respect of the UK's potential to re-establish a manufacturing base for telecommunications infrastructure.

== Products and services ==
Since 2010 Filtronic has concentrated on the manufacture of transceivers for use in E-Band point-to-point radio links, which operate in the millimetre-wave frequency range. E-Band transceivers (in the bands 71 – 76GHz and 81 – 86GHz) have applications in high-capacity backhaul, midhaul and fronthaul (collectively known as XHaul) links up to 10 Gbit/s for use in 5G mobile networks, and in High Altitude Platform Stations (HAPS). In November 2020 Filtronic became a member of the HAPS Alliance. Other products in development include subsystems for W-Band, D-Band and X-Band. Filtronic's US facility specialises in manufacturing tower-mounted amplifiers for applications in professional mobile radio and critical telecommunications. The company also offers microelectronics contract manufacturing services to customers in the defence and aerospace, critical communications and telecommunication infrastructure sectors.

== External links section ==
Company website
