= Copyright Hub =

British organisation

The Copyright Hub is a UK-based non-profit organisation attempting to lower the transaction costs of licensing copyrighted items. Founded in 2013 with initial funding from the British government of £150,000, but with the majority of its funding coming from the private sector, it was proposed in the Hargreaves Review which recommended the creation of an "industry-led" body, dubbed the Digital Copyright Exchange by Hargreaves, to make licensing more convenient.

The Copyright Hub teamed up with Digital Catapult, a UK innovation agency, which took on responsibility for developing the open source technology which would deliver the Hub's vision. The idea was to make it easy and free for anyone to attach an identifier to any piece of content, and then to create a record with the Copyright Hub which would link that identifier to an authoritative record of information about the piece of content and its owner. The technology would also allow automated licensing processes to take place, making authorisation and creation of records of permission a very low cost process.

After working with Digital Catapult for about two years, The Copyright Hub separated and took over responsibility for developing and maintaining the technology. Some new funding was provided by the Intellectual Property Office in the UK, who also took a seat on the board and took responsibility for appointing a Chairman.

It planned to create a browser extension and an online copyright ownership database, the plugin talking to the database to allow Internet users to conveniently license copyrighted works such as images. The planned launch date was January 2016. Revised plug-ins for Chrome and Firefox were launched in early 2018.

It is still working on its technology, largely through the EU-funded ARDITO project.
