= List of science parks in the United Kingdom =

This is a list of science parks in the United Kingdom.

== England ==
=== South West ===
- Bristol and Bath Science Park – Emersons Green, Bristol
- Electronics & Photonics Innovation Centre (EPIC) – Paignton, Devon
- Exeter Science Park – Exeter
- Future Space – Stoke Gifford, Bristol
- Plymouth Science Park – Plymouth
- Porton Down – Porton, Wiltshire
- Dorset Innovation Park – Winfrith, Dorset

=== South East ===
- Begbroke Science Park – Begbroke, near Oxford
- Culham Science Centre – Culham, Oxfordshire
- Discovery Park – Sandwich, Kent
- Harwell Science and Innovation Campus – Harwell, Oxfordshire
- Kent Science Park – Sittingbourne
- Langstone Technology Park – Havant, Hampshire
- Milton Park – South Oxfordshire
- Oxford Science Park – Oxford
- Surrey Research Park – Guildford
- University of Reading Science & Technology Centre – Reading
- Southampton Science Park – Southampton

=== Greater London ===
- Brunel Science Park – Uxbridge
- Lee Valley Technopark – Tottenham
- South Bank Technopark – Southwark
- The London Science Park at The Bridge – Dartford

=== East Anglia ===
- Allia Future Business Centre – Cambridge, Peterborough and East London
- Babraham Research Campus – Cambridge
- BioPark – Welwyn Garden City
- Cambridge Research Park – Cambridge
- Cambridge Science Park – Cambridge
- Cambridge Bio-Medical Campus – Cambridge
- Chesterford Research Park – Saffron Walden, Essex
- Colworth Science Park – Sharnbrook, Bedfordshire
- Cranfield Technology Park – Cranfield, Bedfordshire
- Granta Park – Cambridge
- Norwich Research Park – Colney, Norwich
- Papworth Bioincubator – Cambridge
- St John's Innovation Centre – Cambridge
- The University of Essex Research Park – Colchester

=== East Midlands ===
- BioCity Nottingham – Nottingham
- MediCity Nottingham – Nottingham
- Loughborough University Science & Enterprise Park – Loughborough
- Nottingham Science and Technology Park – Nottingham
- University of Nottingham Innovation Park – Nottingham

=== West Midlands ===
- Birmingham Research Park Ltd – Birmingham
- Birmingham Science Park Aston – Aston, Birmingham
- Coventry University Technology Park – Coventry
- Keele University Science Park – Keele, Staffordshire
- Malvern Hills Science Park – Malvern, Worcestershire
- Staffordshire Technology Park – Stafford, Staffordshire
- University of Warwick Science Park – Coventry
- University Science Park, Pebble Mill – Edgbaston, Birmingham
- Wolverhampton Science Park – Wolverhampton

=== North West ===
- Alderley Park – Cheshire
- The Heath Business and Technical Park – Runcorn, Cheshire
- Lancaster Science Park – Lancaster
- Liverpool Innovation Park – Liverpool
- Liverpool Science Park – Liverpool
- Manchester Science Park Ltd – Manchester
- MerseyBio – Liverpool
- Sci-Tech Daresbury – Cheshire
- Westlakes Science & Technology Park – Cumbria

=== Yorkshire ===
- Advanced Manufacturing Park – Rotherham
- Leeds Innovation Centre – Leeds
- Newlands Science Park – Kingston upon Hull
- Sheffield Technology Parks – Sheffield
- York Science Park – York
- National Agri-Food Innovation Campus – York

=== North East ===
- NETPark – The North East Technology Park – Sedgefield, County Durham
- Sunderland Science Park – Sunderland
- Wilton Centre – North Yorkshire

== Scotland ==
- Aberdeen Science Parks – Aberdeen
- Ayrshire Innovation Centre – Irvine
- BioCity Glasgow - Glasgow
- BioQuarter – Edinburgh
- Dundee Medipark – Dundee
- Dundee Technology Park – Dundee
- Edinburgh Technopole – Edinburgh
- Elvingston Science Centre – East Lothian
- Heriot-Watt University Research Park – Edinburgh
- Hillington Park Innovation Centre – Glasgow
- Pentlands Science Park – Midlothian
- Roslin BioCentre – Midlothian
- Scottish Enterprise Technology Park – East Kilbride
- Stirling University Innovation Park – Stirling
- Tweed Horizons – Melrose
- West of Scotland Science Park – Glasgow

== Wales ==
- M-SParc (Menai Science Park) – Anglesey
- Cardiff Business Technology Centre – Cardiff
- Cardiff Edge - Cardiff

== Northern Ireland ==
- AURIL – Belfast
- Catalyst – Belfast
- Ulster Science & Technology Park – Derry
- University of Ulster Science Research Parks – Derry
