= NETPark =

Science park in County Durham, England

- Location of NETPark in County Durham
- Interactive map of NETPark
- Coordinates: 54°40′13″N 01°27′03″W
- Opening date: 2004; 22 years ago
- Manager: Business Durham
- Owner: Durham County Council
- No. of tenants: 40 (2023)
- No. of workers: 700 (2023)
- Website: www.northeasttechnologypark.com

NETPark, or the North East Technology Park, is a British science park in Sedgefield, Durham. It is owned by Durham County Council and run by Business Durham, the business support service of the council, with strategic partners Centre for Process Innovation (CPI) and Durham University.

NETPark hosts three national catapult centres: CPI was a founding partner of the High Value Manufacturing Catapult in 2011 and are joined by the North East Centre of Excellence for Satellite Applications and the Space Enterprise Lab NETPark, part of the Satellite Applications Catapult, and the Compound Semiconductor Applications Catapult North East. CPI also manages three national innovation centres at NETPark: the National Formulation Centre, the National Printable Electronics Centre and the National Healthcare Photonics Centre. It is also home to Orbit, Durham University's enterprise zone, and the university's Centre for Advanced Instrumentation.

NETPark was opened in 2004 by the local Member of Parliament for Sedgefield and Prime Minister of the United Kingdom, Tony Blair.

== History ==
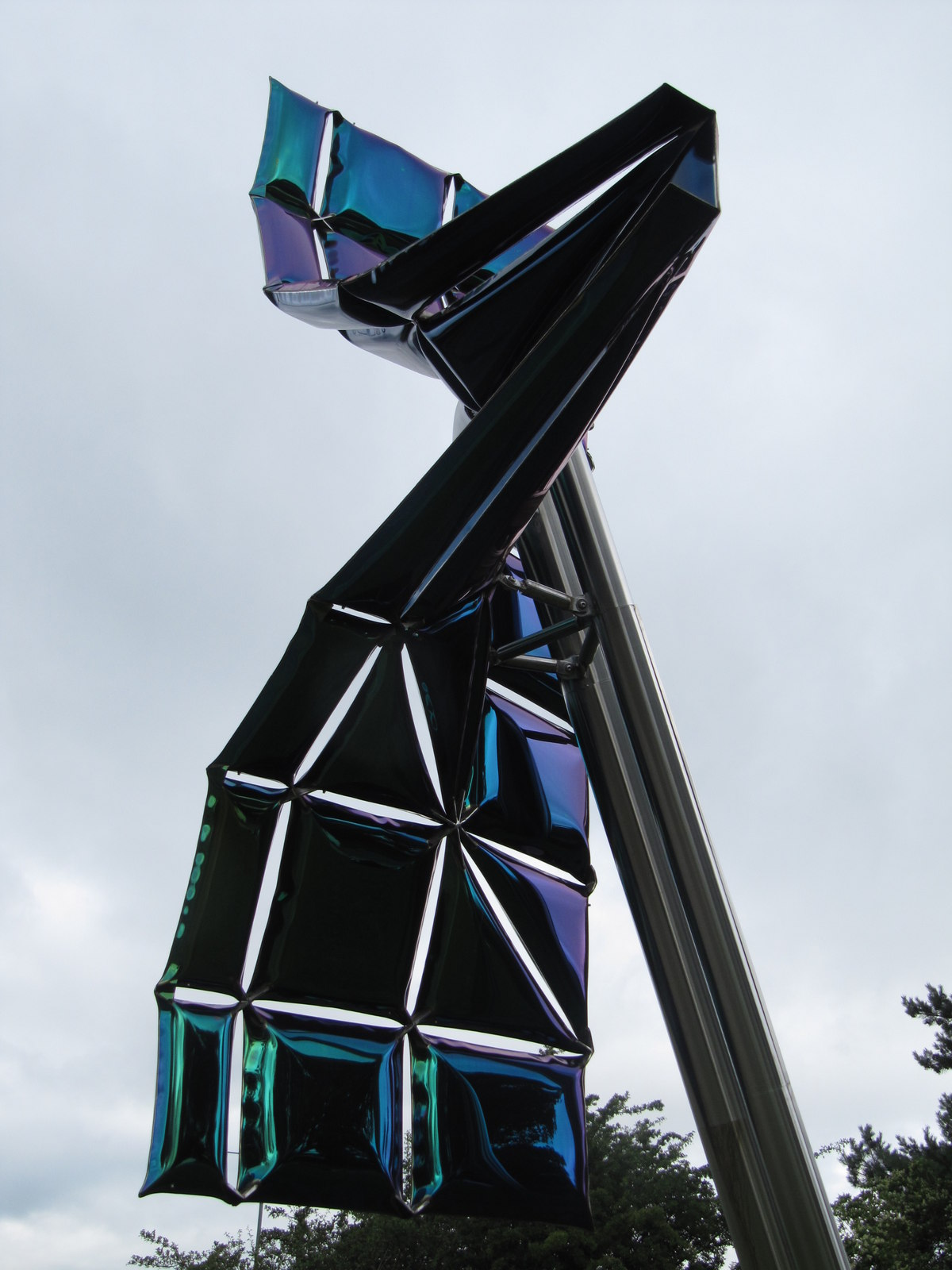
The Plexus sculpture at NETPark

The NETPark site, the former Winterton Hospital, was transferred from the National Health Service to Durham County Council in 2000, and the NETPark project was officially launched in May 2001 as a development by Durham County Council and Sedgefield Borough Council in partnership with Durham University, the National Health Service and the One NorthEast regional development agency.

The first building, Durham University's NETPark Research Institute, was opened by Tony Blair in July 2004; Blair returned in December 2005 to officially open the science park. The first company – Kromek, a Durham University spin-out – then moved on-site in 2006, with other companies also moving in that year.

In 2008, CPI started work on their first innovation centre at NETPark, the Printable Electronics Technology Centre (now the National Printable Electronics Centre). Later that year, a memorandum of understanding was signed between Durham County Council, Durham University and CPI to work together to grow NETPark, on the first piece of thin film to be produced at the centre. The Printable Electronics Technology Centre officially opened in 2009.

IN 2011, the High Value Manufacturing Catapult was established with CPI as one of the founding partners, bringing the first catapult centre to NETPark. CPI's Graphene Applications Innovation Centre was opened in 2016. In 2014, the Satellite Applications Catapult opened the North East Satellite Applications Centre of Excellence, one of three centres of excellence across the UK, at NETPark. The National Formulation Centre was opened in 2018, followed by the National Healthcare Photonics Centre in 2019.

In 2021, Durham University's enterprise zone, Orbit, opened at NETPark. This was followed a month later by the announcement that the Satellite Applications Catapult would be opening a Space Enterprise Lab at the park.

Prince Charles (now King Charles) visited NETPark in April 2022, receiving a guided tour of the Kromek plant and unveiling a plaque to officially commission their 154-furnace Brinkman Cadmium Zinc Telluride Growth Facility.

In 2023, the Compound Semiconductor Applications Catapult established its north-east centre at NETPark, and work commenced on a £63 million expansion. This will open up another 10.5 hectares (26 acres) for development and is projected to support 1,250 new jobs.

NETPark was named as part of the North East Investment Zone by the UK Government in 2024. This included £11.3 million to support the phase 3 development.

In 2025, CPI opened the Advanced Materials Battery Industrialisation Centre at NETPark in collaboration with WMG at the University of Warwick.

In 2026, Lockheed Martin announced plans for an £85 million satellite factory at NETPark, to be built if it won a UK government contract for the Skynet 6 system.

The same year, the North East Mayoral Strategic Authority announced the Centre for Realisation and Advancement of Future Technologies, funded by the UK Governments Local Innovation Partnership Fund and led by Durham University. The centre is intended to transform scientific research in areas including space and fusion into practical technology and will be based at NETPark.

== Significant tenants ==
- Durham University Centre for Advanced Instrumentation, which built some of the optics for the James Webb Space Telescope's NIRSpec instrument at NETPark
- Filtronic, a maker of satellite communications, 5G and radar equipment
- Kromek, a Durham University spin-out that is now a multinational company with US subsidiaries, making detectors used in airport scanners and nuclear security
- PolyPhotonix, which makes photonic medical devices, having initially used CPI's facilities at NETPark to develop a commercially viable product
- Pragmatic Semiconductor, a University of Manchester spin-out making flexible, non-silicon integrated circuits

== See also ==
- List of science parks in the United Kingdom
