= Centre for Process Innovation =

Centre for Process Innovation (CPI)
- Logo used from April 2014
- Founder: ONE NorthEast
- Headquarters: Wilton Centre, Redcar, United Kingdom
- Number of locations: 10 (2024)
- Key people: Frank Millar (CEO)
- Revenue: 57,318,466 euro (2020)
- Number of employees: 700 (2024)
- Website: www.uk-cpi.com

The Centre for Process Innovation Limited, trading as CPI, is a British technology and innovation social enterprise covering the agricultural and food technology, energy storage, health technology, materials, and pharmaceutical industry markets, with an emphasis on sustainable solutions and improving healthcare. CPI's headquarters are in Redcar, North Yorkshire. Established in 2004 by the UK Government agency ONE NorthEast, the company was one of five centres of excellence in a long-term strategy to "reposition the North-East [of England] on the world stage for research and development".

== Role ==
CPI helps small and medium enterprises, entrepreneurs and companies to develop, prove, prototype and scale-up new products and processes by providing access to facilities, expertise and networks of public and private funders.

CPI is a founding partner in the High Value Manufacturing Catapult, a network of technology and innovation centres designed to transform the UK's capability for innovation in specific technology areas and markets to help drive future economic growth.

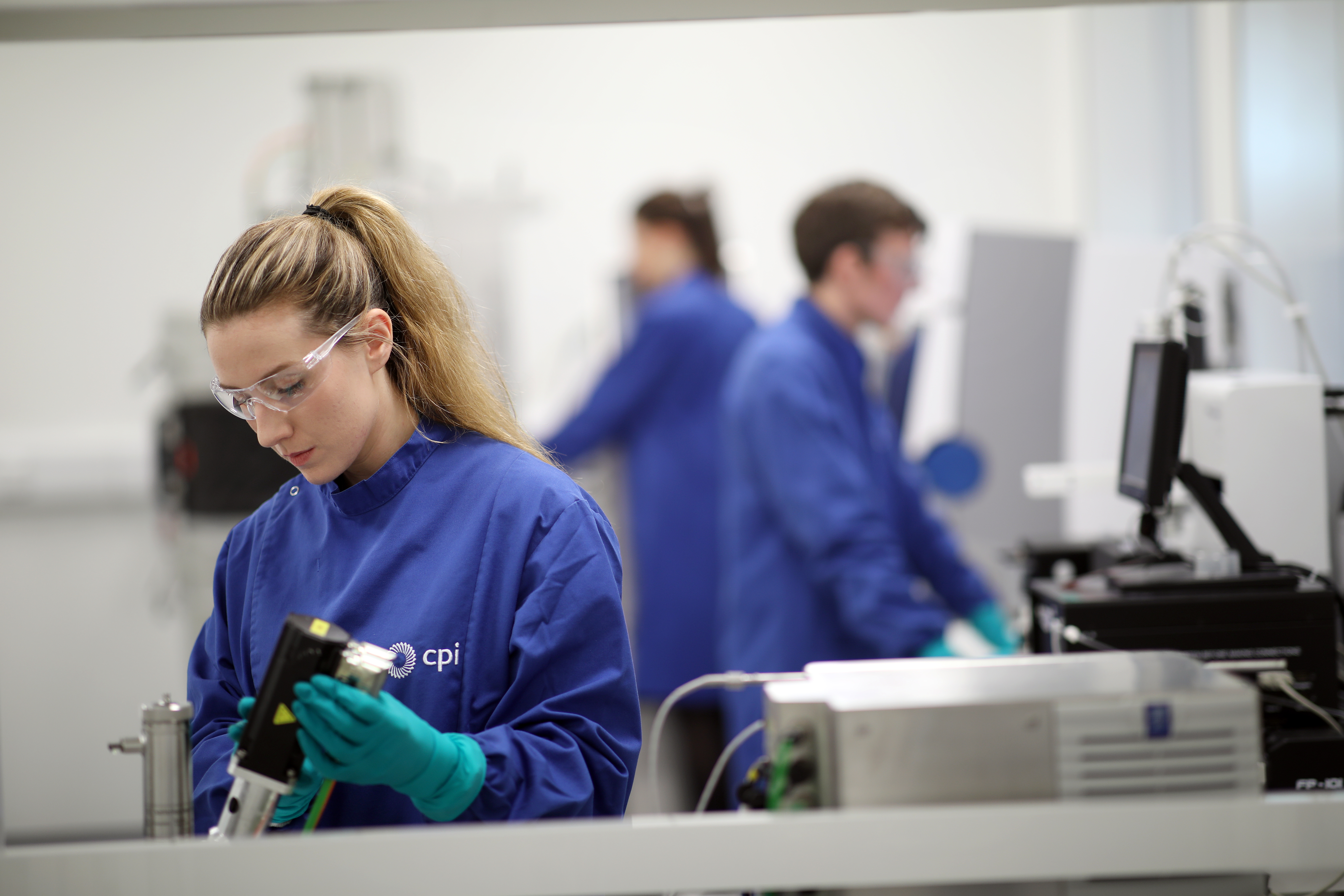
A scientist in the biotherapeutics lab at CPI

== Centres ==
The company has ten innovation facilities at three locations in North East England and one location in Scotland.

Wilton, Redcar:

- National Industrial Biotechnology Facility
- Novel Food Innovation Centre

NETPark, Sedgefield:

- National Printable Electronics Centre
- National Formulation Centre
- National Healthcare Photonics Centre
- The Graphene Application Centre
- Intracellular Drug Delivery Centre

Darlington:

- National Biologics Manufacturing Centre,
- The RNA Centre of Excellence

Glasgow:

- The Medicines Manufacturing Innovation Centre

CPI has also announced plans to launch an Oligonucleotide Manufacturing Innovation Centre of Excellence in Glasgow after a multi-million-pound fund was announced in the 2023 Autumn Statement. The centre is expected to begin operations during 2024 and to be completed in late 2025.

== Market areas served ==
CPI helps companies take their products and processes from idea to commercialisation in several areas.

=== Agricultural and food technology ===
CPI's work in sustainable agricultural and food technology has included opening the Novel Food Innovation Centre based in the Tees Valley at Wilton, Redcar to support the development of alternative proteins and novel foods for human consumption. CPI has been awarded FSSC 22000 food safety certification by Foundation FSSC.

=== Energy storage ===
CPI is a partner in three projects awarded a share of £27.6 million in funding from UK Research and Innovation’s Faraday Battery Challenge, delivered by Innovate UK in 2023. The projects aim to improve battery performance and sustainability, reduce costs, and develop more efficient and globally competitive manufacturing processes for electric vehicle batteries.

=== Health technology ===
CPI's work in health technology (HealthTech) has included partnering with telecommunications company Cellnex UK to develop a testbed for 5G networks within hospitals. CPI has also advocated for UK HealthTech manufacturing by producing reports on the state of the industry and action plans for driving growrth, and affirming the UK Government’s decision in 2023 to rejoin the Horizon Europe scientific research programme as an associate member.

=== Materials ===
CPI has a partnership with the National Composites Centre to develop sustainable composites and helped Oceanium Ltd develop compostable bio-packaging from sustainably-farmed seaweed. CPI also worked with Chestnut Bio to produce bio-polymers and biodegradable plastic for forestry and planting to replace single-use plastic guards and cable ties.

=== Pharmaceuticals ===
CPIs work in pharmaceutical manufacturing includes digital pharmaceutical manufacturing solutions such as the Digital Design Accelerator and digital bioprocess modelling.

These pharmaceutical focus areas are structured around the "Grand Challenges" business model of the Medicines Manufacturing Innovation Centre, which was opened by CPI and other founding partners in 2022. In addition, CPI is a partner in the Intracellular Drug Delivery Centre, which focuses on lipid nanoparticle formulation development and nanomedicine delivery systems. To support therapeutic RNA and oligonucleotide production, CPI opened the RNA Centre for Excellence in 2023 and announced plans for the Oligonucleotide Manufacturing Innovation Centre of Excellence within the Advanced Manufacturing Innovation District Scotland (AMIDS), near Glasgow, Scotland.

== COVID-19, the RNA Centre of Excellence, and RNA-based vaccines and therapeutics ==
As a member of the UK Government’s Vaccine Taskforce, CPI supported the development and production of mRNA-based COVID-19 vaccines. In 2021, CPI was awarded £5 million to develop a new facility for rapidly producing mRNA vaccine candidates in response to new COVID variants. With a further award of £10.65 million from the Vaccine Taskforce, administered by Innovate UK, CPI launched the RNA Centre of Excellence to develop treatments for cancer, flu vaccines and personalised medicines including gene therapy. The funding also covered the formation of an RNA Training Academy.

== Funding ==
In 2011, CPI joined the UK Government's Catapult centres network as part of the High Value Manufacturing Catapult. It has also received funding from the European Regional Development Fund and the EU's Horizon 2020 programme. Further funding through the Catapult network was announced in 2018.

== Investment ==
In 2020, CPI launched its venture capital and investor engagement arm, CPI Enterprises. As of July 2023, it has made twelve investments, with one exit after the company Nuformix proceeded to an initial public offering (IPO).

CPI Enterprise's current portfolio includes QV Bioelectronics, which is developing an Electric Field Therapy implant to treat brain tumours such as glioblastoma, and BiologIC Technologies, a company that has invented a biocomputer to process cells, DNA, and biological reagents into therapies.
