= Christopher Snowden =

British electronic engineer and academic

Sir Christopher Maxwell Snowden, FRS, , FIET (born 1956) is a British electronic engineer and academic. He was the former Vice-Chancellor of Surrey University (2005–2015), and of the University of Southampton (2015–2019). He was president of Universities UK for a two-year term until 31 July 2015. He is currently the chairman of the ERA Foundation.

== Biography ==
=== Early career ===
Snowden studied electronic and electrical engineering at the University of Leeds, gaining a BSc in 1977, and an MSc and PhD in 1982. His PhD involved microwave oscillators for radar applications and semiconductor device modelling. He conducted his PhD research at Racal-MESL Ltd near Edinburgh in Scotland as well as at the University of Leeds.

From 1977-78, Snowden was an application engineer for Mullard Applications Laboratory. He lectured at the Department of Electronics in the University of York from 1982 to 1983. From 1983 to 2005 he was a member of staff at the University of Leeds, his former alma mater, working in the Department of Electrical and Electronic Engineering, and becoming professor of microwave engineering in 1992. He was head of the school from 1995 to 1998 and briefly acted as warden of Bodington Hall. While at Leeds he was a founder of the Institute of Microwave and Photonics and had 50 PhD students under his supervision. He also worked at M/A-COM in the US between 1989–1991 as senior staff scientist in the Corporate Research and Development Centre, based just outside Boston.

In 1998, he was appointed to the board of Filtronic plc as Executive Director of Technology, where he initiated the Global Technology Group. He was subsequently appointed joint chief executive officer of Filtronic plc in 1999. In 2001, he became chief executive officer of Filtronic ICS.

He was also a visiting professor at Durham University until 2005 and a visiting scientist at the Delft University of Technology from 1996 to 1998.

=== University of Surrey ===
Snowden was President and Vice-Chancellor of the University of Surrey from 2005 to 2015.

In 2009 he announced 65 job cuts, just weeks after the University announced it had successfully bid for £600,000 funding to help people at risk of losing their jobs during the recession. He was later criticized for proposing further job cuts despite the university being in £4m surplus at the time. Under his leadership, Surrey considered introducing metric measurement of staff performance based on the number of students achieving 60% or above and later considered a new threshold that staff needed to reach in student evaluations (3.8 out of 5) if they were to avoid being targeted for special measures. The latter prompting UCU to consider a vote of no confidence in Snowden.

The University achieved 4th place in the 2016 Guardian University League Table rising from 6th place in 2015. Surrey was named University of the Year in The Times and Sunday Times Good University Guide 2016. It came top in the 'Best Teaching' and 'Best Student Experience' categories. This was despite an ongoing dispute between students and the UCU over cuts across the University.

=== Universities UK ===
Snowden was president of the 134-member Universities UK group (UUK) from 1 August 2013 to 31 July 2015. He succeeded Eric Thomas, the vice-chancellor of the University of Bristol, and was succeeded by Dame Julia Goodfellow. From November 2012 to August 2013, Snowden held one of the vice-president positions of UUK, representing England and Northern Ireland, and from 2009 to 2011 he chaired their Employability, Business and Industry Policy Committee.

=== University of Southampton ===
On 20 March 2015, the University of Southampton announced that Snowden would become its new Vice Chancellor following the retirement of Professor Don Nutbeam, a move which took effect from October 2015.

In 2017, Snowden spearheaded the biggest investment program in Southampton's 155-year history, with a plan to invest over £600 million over the next decade. To do this, the University raised a £300 million bond.

In June 2017 Snowden spoke out against the Teaching Excellence Framework which had given Southampton University a Bronze rating, calling it "fundamentally flawed" and having "no value or credibility".

In 2018 the University of Southampton was awarded silver rating. Snowden released a statement thanking those within the institution who had contributed and stating that the rating was an assurance to students that their experience at the University of Southampton will translate into excellent graduate outcomes.

Snowden retired from his role at Southampton in Spring 2019. He will be succeeded as Vice-Chancellor by Professor Mark Smith.

=== Criticism of salary ===
From June 2017 Snowden's salary became part of the UK wide debate on Vice Chancellor's pay, which had been started by criticism of the pay of Dame Glynis Breakwell, Vice Chancellor of the University of Bath. Snowden's salary of £433,000 was among the higher salaries in the UK Higher Education sector and drew specific criticism from then Universities Minister Jo Johnson and Labour Peer Lord Adonis. In March 2018 The Guardian, in an article about UK Vice Chancellors pay, highlighted that Snowden's salary as the head of University of Southampton was higher the chief executives of Southampton City Council (£166,786) or University Hospital Southampton NHS Foundation Trust(£195,000).

There was additional criticism of a substantial pay increase, including by UCU general Secretary Sally Hunt. However, this was later clarified as being the difference between Snowden's payment for his first 10 months in his role in 2015–2016 compared to his salary of his first full 12 months in employment in the academic year 2016–2017.

The Chair of the University of Southampton's Council Gill Rider defended Snowden's level of remuneration as reflecting his experience.

== Research ==
Snowden's research interests are in the areas of microwave, millimetre-wave and optoelectronic devices and circuits. He pioneered the application of numerical physical device models to comprehensively describe electron transport in microwave transistor operation and in particular investigating device-circuit interaction properties. This allowed transistor designs to be significantly improved and optimized. This work was specifically recognized in his election as a Fellow of the Royal Society and as a Fellow of the IEEE.

His early work focused on two-dimensional numerical modelling. In particular, he worked on hot-electron effects in short-gate length field effect transistors (FETs), where he showed that the high energy electrons in transistor substrates contributed significantly to the conduction current. He also contributed to the development of new non-linear laser diode models, which found particular application in emerging high data rate communication systems.

During the mid-1980s, along with colleagues in Lille and Duisburg universities, he explored the potential for a new class of physical model, which became known as the quasi-two-dimensional (Q2D) approach. This was shown to be extremely effective at modelling field-effect transistors, such as the popular metal semiconductor FET (MESFET). Snowden's models were shown to have the ability to accurately predict the DC and RF performance based on the physical geometry and material properties available from fabrication data. Moreover, the Q2D model can be solved over 1000 times faster than full two-dimensional models, making it suitable for computer aided design applications. These models were widely used around the world in industry and academia. The models were used to develop high performance microwave transistors with highly predictable characteristics which went on to be manufactured in high volumes by several companies. One of the most successful was the 'hi-lo-hi' pulse-doped microwave transistor which achieved high breakdown voltages and was particularly suited to high volume manufacturing.

Snowden went on to apply this technique to high electron mobility transistors (HEMTs), between 1995 and 2005 utilizing highly effective quantum charge-control models. It was shown to be an effective method for modelling and designing AlGaAs/GaAs HEMTs and the important pseudomorphic high electron mobility transistors (pHEMTs) based on InGaAs/GaAs systems. New designs of power pHEMT (some with capabilities of over 100W at 2 GHz) were developed and fabricated using this knowledge, which achieved high breakdown voltages while retaining excellent signal gain at microwave frequencies. pHEMTs are widely used in communication applications and many billions of circuits based on pHEMT integrated circuits have been used in products such as mobile phones, radar and satellite receivers. Since 2008, he has applied new Q2D models to laterally diffused MOS power transistors (LDMOS) for high power amplifiers in communications systems, achieving similar high levels of accurate prediction and speed advantage.

During 1990 to 1997, Snowden developed a new electrothermal physics-based equivalent circuit model for heterojunction bipolar transistors, which was suited to power amplifier applications (widely used in cellular handsets). He was awarded the IEEE Microwave Theory and Techniques Society Microwave Prize in 1999 for this work, described in his 1997 paper "Large-signal Microwave Characterization of AlGaAs/GaAs HBT's Based on a Physics Based Electrothermal Model' (IEEE TMTT, MTT-45, pp. 58–71, 1997).

Snowden went on to develop further models based on incorporating the interaction between thermal effects and electronic behavior, which proved to be important in accurately modelling power transistor and in power amplifier designs. Subsequently, he developed this into fully integrated models incorporating electromagnetic effects into the physical models and demonstrating the significance of this type of global model for millimetre-wave circuits.

He also developed several novel techniques for integrating microwave, millimeter-wave and optical circuits. During his time at M/A-COM whilst working as Senior Staff Scientist he extended their glass microwave integrated circuit (GMIC) technology to photonics, introducing the concept of embedding light guides in the GMIC to allow photonic circuits and interfaces to solid-state lasers, detectors and high speed processors. He first presented these concepts at the 1991 IEEE LEOS conference and the concept was subsequently developed for use at 622 Mbit/s in synchronous optical network (SONET) applications.

Snowden has written eight books including Introduction to Semiconductor Device Modelling, Introduction to Semiconductor Device Modelling and Introduction to Semiconductor Device Modelling. He published one of the first interactive circuit analysis software packages for personal computers with Wiley in 1988. He has acted as editor for four journals and three special issues as well as the EEE Wiley book series. He has chaired a number of major international conferences including the 2006 European Microwave Conference.

== Fellowships, memberships, societies and companies ==
Snowden is past-president of the Institution of Engineering and Technology (IET) (2009–2010). Until August 2013 he was vice-president of the Royal Academy of Engineering where he chaired the Academy's Engineering Policy Committee. In 2014 he was invited to be Deputy Chairman of the 2015 judging panel for the Queen Elizabeth Prize for Engineering (QEPrize) and is now the chair.

Snowden was appointed by the Prime Minister to his advisory Council for Science and Technology (CST) in 2011. He is also a member of the UK Government's Foresight Advisory Board.

Snowden was a member of the governing body of the UK's Innovate UK (previously known as the Technology Strategy Board (TSB)) from 2009 to 2015. He was a member of the Council for Industry and Higher Education (CIHE) (CIHE) and is a current member of the Leadership Council for the National Centre for Universities and Business (NCUB). Between 2006 and 2012, he was a Member of the Council of the UK's Engineering and Physical Sciences Research Council (EPSRC).

He is a Fellow of the Royal Society (2005) and was a member of their Council (2012–2013). He is a Fellow of the Royal Academy of Engineering (2000), the Institution of Engineering and Technology (IET) (1993), the IEEE (1996) and the City and Guilds of London Institute (2005).

He has been a member of Foresight Committee panels on Communications and Media and Exploitation of the Electromagnetic Spectrum. He was a member of the UK's National Advisory Committee on Electronic Materials from 2002 to 2007. He was a member of the supervisory board of the Electromagnetic Remote Sensing Defense Technology Centre from 2002 to 2005. He has appeared before the UK's House of Commons Select Committee on several occasions.

He was Chairman of the Daphne Jackson Trust from 2005 to 2009 and was a patron of the Trust until 2015. He was a patron of Surrey Youth Focus and Transform Housing & Support until 2015. He was a Governor of the Royal Surrey County Hospital NHS Foundation UK until 2011.

He has been a non-executive director of companies such as Intense Ltd, CENAMPS Ltd and SSTL. He was a board member of the European Microwave Association from 2003-2007, where he was also vice-chair for a period. He was chair of HERO Ltd from 2006–2009 and a member of the governing board of the Engineering Technology Board from 2007–2009.

He was a member of the South East England Science, Engineering and Technology Advisory Council (SESETAC) until 2011.

== Honours and awards ==
He was awarded the IEEE Microwave Prize in 1999 for his research paper on microwave power transistors for communicating applications and the IEEE Distinguished Educator Award in 2009 by the Microwave Theory and Techniques Society (MTT).

The Royal Academy of Engineering awarded him their Silver Medal for 'Outstanding Personal Contributions to the UK Microwave Semiconductor Industry' in 2004.

In 2009 he received the IEEE MTT Distinguished Educator Award for outstanding achievements as an educator, mentor, and role model of microwave engineers and engineering students.

Snowden was knighted in the 2012 New Year Honours for services to engineering and higher education.
