= Jonathan Neale =

British engineer and business executive (born 1962)

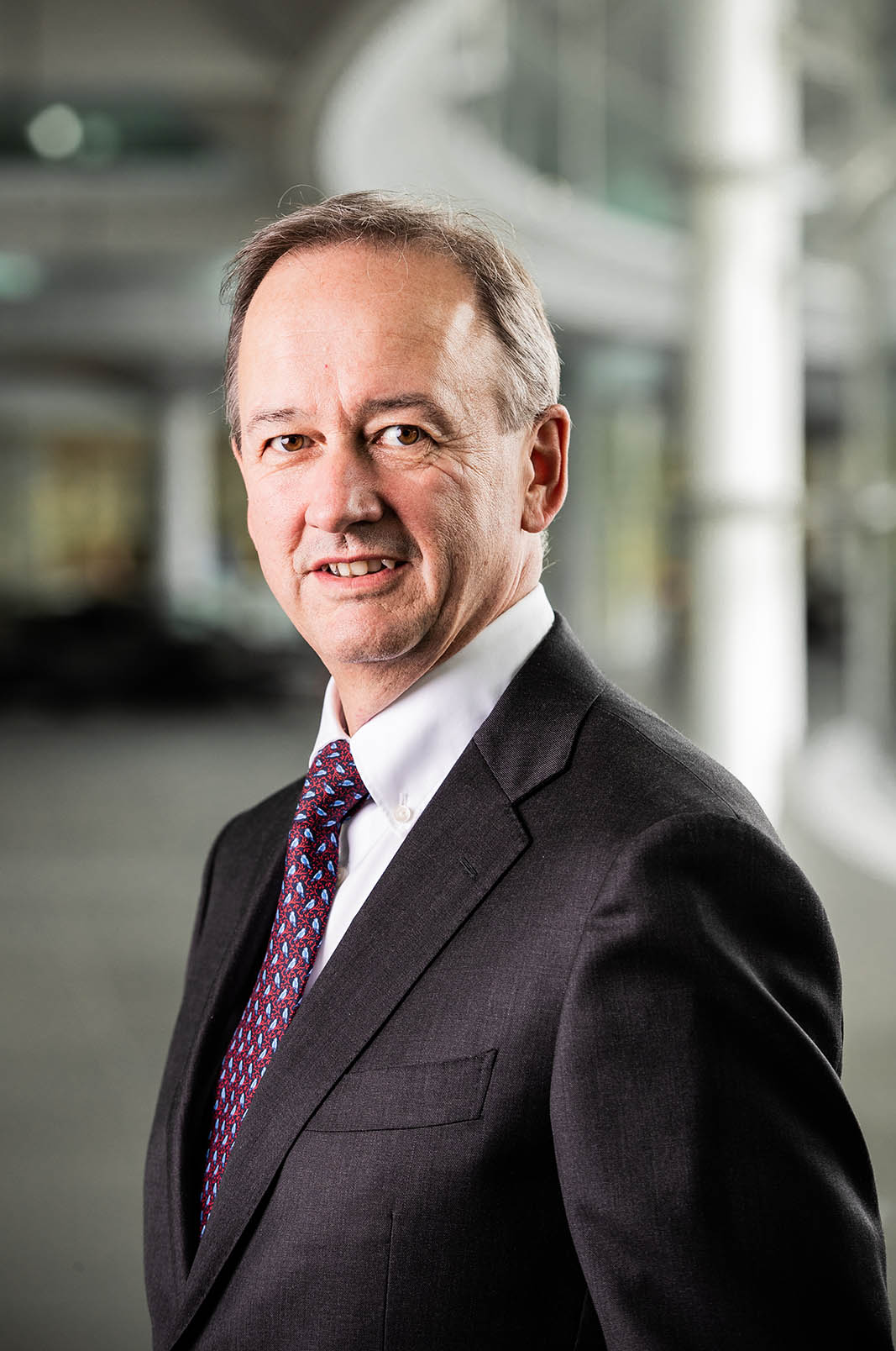
- Born: 19 August 1962 (age 64); Woking, Surrey, England
- Education: University of Nottingham
- Occupation: Chairman of Filtronic
- Employer: Filtronic
- Known for: McLaren Group; McLaren Racing

Jonathan Neale (born 19 August 1962) is a British businessman and the chief operating officer of McLaren Group. Neale's responsibilities as part of the executive management team include infrastructure development, information technology, facilities management as well as holding a number of statutory directorships.

== Career ==
Neale has a background in physics and aerospace. He has a physics degree from the University of Nottingham, is a member of the Council for the Foundation for Science and Technology based at The Royal Society, London. He is also a fellow of the Institute of Engineering and Technology.

Initially starting his career at Philips Electronics Defence Systems in 1984, Neale worked as an engineer on electronic semiconductor research and software projects, including microwave technology, antennas and low noise amplifiers for defence systems.

Neale joined BAE Systems in 1991 as a project design engineer and remained there until joining McLaren Formula One team in 2001. During his time at BAE Systems, he worked on a broad range of commercial and defence projects, across functions from engineering, production, flight operations, sales and customer support in sites at Manchester, Prestwick, Brough and Warton.

Joining McLaren Formula One team in 2001 as operations director, Neale oversaw the team go from strength to strength, with his role as managing director marked by the F1 World Championship win for McLaren, with Lewis Hamilton, in 2008. His career at McLaren Group continued with his appointment in 2016 as chief operating officer.

In November 2021, Neale joined RF and microwave equipment manufacturer Filtronic as non-executive chairman.

== Engineering and Aerospace ==
Neale began his career in engineering at Philips Electronics Defence Systems in Crawley, West Sussex in 1984. Work included designing semiconductor integrated circuits for high-speed digital signal processing applications, before moving on to the advanced development and research unit responsible for technology to detect missiles for ships and submarines.

It wasn't until joining BAE Systems in 1991 that Neale became more involved with the commercial aspects of engineering and manufacture. Initially starting out as a project design engineer, he worked to deliver production-line based projects to the Advanced Turboprop and Regional Jet products, before moving to Prestwick, Scotland, where he managed turboprop aircraft production and final assembly.

This work in commercial aerospace continued throughout the 1990s, with Neale having roles as Operations Director and Support-Operations including customer support, aircraft maintenance, and training.

In 1999, Neale became programme director for the BAE Systems Hawk Jet. The Hawk Jet is perhaps best known for its role in the Royal Air Force Red Arrows Display Team. It continues to be in production today in the UK and under licence in India by Hindustan Aeronautics Limited (HAL), with over 900 Hawks sold to 18 operators around the world. The Hawk was first flown as the Hawker Siddeley Hawk in 1974, at Dunsfold Airfield in Surrey. The airfield would eventually become a test track for road cars, including some of McLaren's own vehicles.

== Motorsport ==
Vodafone McLaren Mercedes MP4-23

In 2001 Neale joined the McLaren Racing Formula One team as Operations Director. At the time, he was responsible initially for the technical purchasing, planning, manufacturing and quality functions of the team. Drivers David Coulthard and Mika Häkkinen and drove the West McLaren Mercedes MP4-16 to second and fifth position in the F1 world championship.

In 2005, Neale became managing director of the McLaren Racing F1 team, culminating in a 2008 World Championship win with Lewis Hamilton in the Vodafone McLaren Mercedes MP4 23

Neale went on to hold the position acting chief executive of McLaren Racing In 2015. This move saw him oversee the operational and commercial activities of the team. He represented the team at the Formula 1 strategy Group and spent time with Honda's F1 Racing Programme In Japan.

== McLaren Group ==
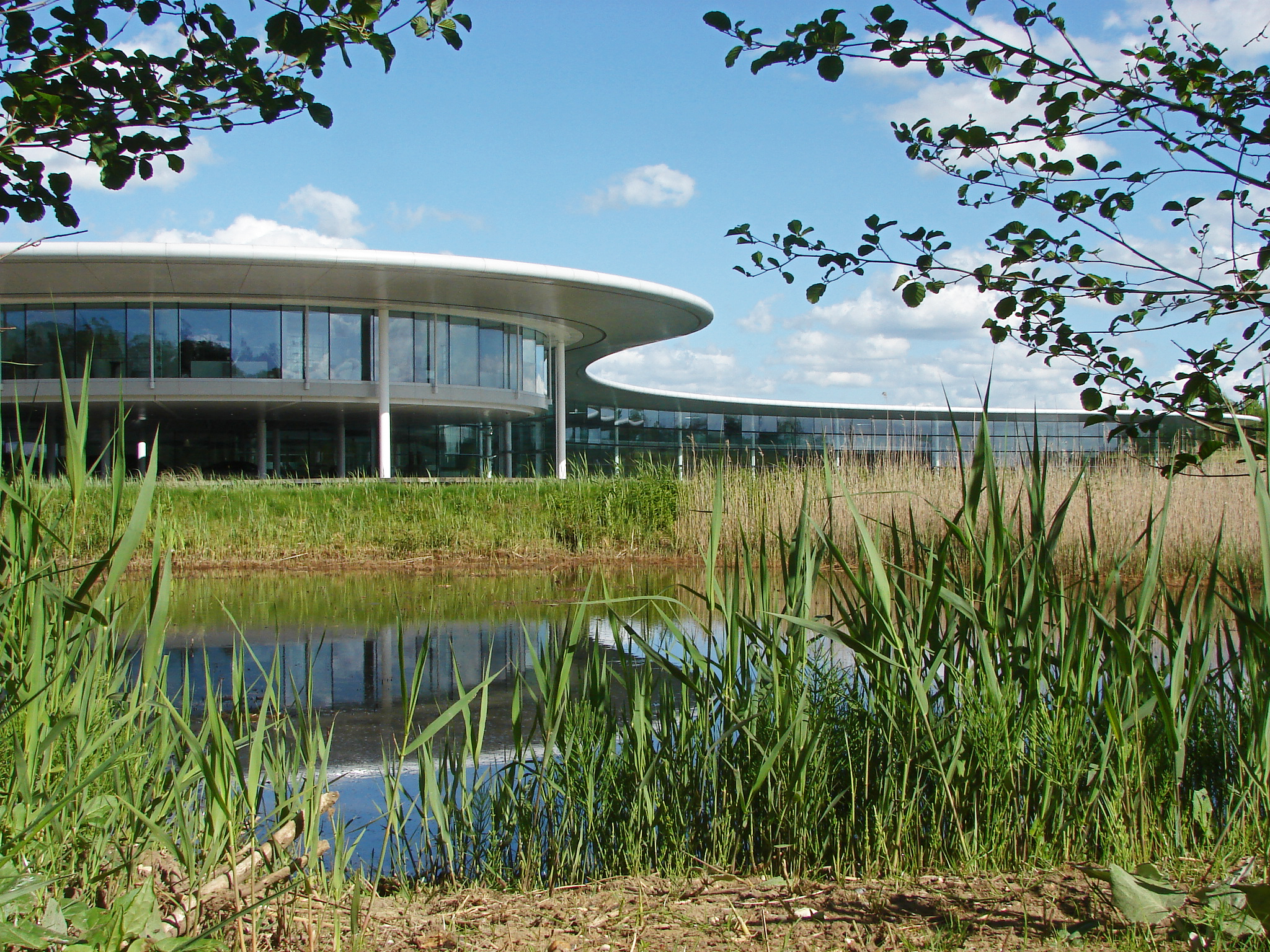
McLaren Technology Centre

Just prior to Ron Dennis stepping down as chief executive officer, he was appointed in 2016 to chief operating officer of McLaren Group. The organisation encompasses McLaren Racing, McLaren Automotive, and McLaren Applied.

The group maufactures sports cars and supercars, such as the 720S and Speedtail. It also operates a Formula One team and innovative technology and systems from McLaren Applied.

Neale's role as chief operating officer sees him report to the executive chairman and work alongside the chair and executive committee to lead growth strategy and the organisation development agenda for the company.

In September 2021 it was announced that Neale would step down as chief operating officer and leave the company at some point in the year.

== Filtronic ==
In November 2021 it was announced that Neale had joined Filtronic as non-executive chairman.

== Personal life ==
Neale resides in Surrey, Woking, with his wife and two children.
