= National Printable Electronics Centre =

The National Printable Electronics Centre is one of several technology centres operated by the United Kingdom's Centre for Process Innovation, a government-funded organisation. Formerly known as the Printable Electronics Technology Centre (PETEC), the site's name was changed in a company-wide re-branding effort beginning in June 2012. The Centre is within NETPark, Sedgefield, County Durham, a science park specialising in the commercialisation of R&D.

== PolyPhotonix ==
PolyPhotonix is a P-OLED and medical device manufacturer based in the National Printable Electronics Centre. PolyPhotonix has collaborated with a number of academic institutions including Harvard (Project Lebone, Lighting Africa), École nationale supérieure de création industrielle (ENSCI) in Paris, Durham University, Moorfields and the University of Liverpool.

PolyPhotonix has developed a light therapy mask that will treat Diabetic Retinopathy. They are also developing photonics based treatments for dry and wet age related macular degeneration as well as treatments for wound healing and skin conditions such as psoriasis.
