= Digital Catapult =

- Type: Non profit
- Founded: 2013; 13 years ago
- Headquarters: London, UK
- Key people: Jürgen Maier (Chair); Susan Bowen (CEO)
- Number of employees: 230+ (2022)
- Website: www.digicatapult.org.uk

Digital Catapult is the UK innovation agency for advanced digital technology, developed in conjunction with Innovate UK (former Technology Strategy Board) as part of the Catapult centres. Digital Catapult works with startups, industries, investors, public sector and academia to accelerates the adoption of new and emerging technologies, with the aim of driving regional, national and international growth for UK businesses across the economy.

== Chief executives ==
Neil Crockett was Digital Catapult's founding CEO, from January 2013 to June 2016.

He was succeeded by Dr Jeremy Silver in June 2016, who was CEO for nearly eight years.

Susan Bowen took over as CEO in March 2024.

== Function ==
Digital Catapult focuses on how digital technologies are applied in areas including supply chains, digital infrastructure and cyber-physical systems, acting in a similar way to a business incubator. Its technology expertise includes artificial intelligence (AI), machine learning, distributed systems, immersive technology (AR, VR), telecommunications (5G), quantum computing and the Internet of things.

It offers organisations accelerator programmes, consultancy, collaborative research & development, and the setup and operation of testbed facilities.

Staff are kept up to date and informed of changes via a so called PULSE meeting which is held from time to time. Trust was a theme of the latest update.

The reorganisation still continues with new jobs appearing on their website regularly.

== Locations ==
Digital Catapult has centres supporting regions across the UK, based in London, Sunderland, Belfast and Bristol.

=== London ===
Digital Catapult is located in the London Borough of Camden, at 101 Euston Road, opposite the British Library and close to St Pancras railway station.

=== North East Tees Valley ===
Digital Catapult NETV is based out of Sunderland in North East England, and runs the NETV Immersive Lab at PROTO in Gateshead.

=== Northern Ireland ===
Digital Catapult Northern Ireland is in the Ormeau Baths Gallery in Belfast.

=== South West ===
Digital Catapult South West is located in Cathedral Square near the centre of Bristol.

== Testbeds and labs ==
Digital catapult has set up a number of testbed facilities across the UK where organisations can experiment with digital technologies, including:

=== Advanced Media Production facility ===
Operated with Target3D, a space for exploring the evolution of media production, using AI, 5G, cloud rendering and edge computing.

=== Immersive labs ===
Labs based in Belfast, Gateshead and London that offer augmented and virtual reality equipment to businesses of all sizes, academia and researchers.

=== SONIC Labs ===
A collaboration between Digital Catapult and Ofcom that offers Open RAN interoperability testing.

== See also ==
- British Automation and Robot Association
- Innovation and Networks Executive Agency of the EU
- National Centre for Computing Education at the University of York
