= University Enterprise Zone =

Designated research and incubator areas in the UK

University Enterprise Zones are specific geographical areas in the United Kingdom where universities engage with Local Enterprise Partnerships to provide business incubator spaces and stimulate economic growth by the application of university backed innovation.

== Pilot program ==
The ten year pilot program for University Enterprise zones was announced by David Cameron in December 2013 "in response to findings in the Witty Review that universities could play a bigger role in enhancing economic growth".

Of the nine applicants, four were funded:

- Sensor_City in Liverpool
- The Digital Health Enterprise Zone in the University of Bradford
- Future Space at the University of the West of England, Bristol
- Ingenuity Centre in University of Nottingham

An interim evaluation of the policy was made in 2017 at a cost of £45k. The final evaluation is due in 2023.

== Second round ==
In September 2019 UK Government funding was announced for 20 further UEZs:

- Birmingham City University, STEAMincubator
- University of Bristol, Unit DX+
- University of Cambridge, Greater Cambridge Health Tech Connect: Testing and integrating inter-disciplinary models of incubation across West/South Cambridge
- Cranfield University, AVIATE+
- Durham University, Orbit, in NETPark
- University of Essex, Accelerating Innovation at the Knowledge Gateway
- University of Exeter
- University of Falmouth, Launchpad
- University of Hertfordshire, The Go Herts University Enterprise Zone
- Keele University, Keele University Corridor University Enterprise Zone
- Lancaster University, Secure Digitalisation University Enterprise Zone
- University of Lincoln, Business Incubation Development to support Food Enterprise Zones
- Oxford Brookes University, Oxford Brookes Artificial Intelligence & Data Analysis Incubator
- Queen Mary University of London, QMUL/Barts Life Sciences University Enterprise Zone
- Sheffield Hallam University, Wellbeing Accelerator
- University of Southampton, Future Towns Innovation Hub
- Staffordshire University, Staffordshire Advanced Materials Incubation and Accelerator Centre
- University of Sunderland
- Teesside University, Innovate Tees Valley University Enterprise Zone
- UCL, East London Inclusive Enterprise Zone in Here East
