= Catapult centres =

British research and development organisations

Catapult centres are a network of nine organisations set up by Innovate UK, an agency of the British government, to promote research and development (R&D) and to exploit market opportunities.

Catapult centres promote R&D and innovation through business-led collaboration between scientists, academics, engineers, entrepreneurs, industry leaders and Government. They receive grants from public funds but are also expected to seek commercial funding. The first centres were established in 2011.

== History ==
In 2010, the Department for Business, Innovation and Skills under Peter Mandelson (subsequently formed into the Department for Business, Energy and Industrial Strategy and then merged into the current Department for Science, Innovation and Technology) commissioned a report on technical innovation from Hermann Hauser, an entrepreneur who had been active in information technology since 1978. The report recommended the establishment of a number of Technology and Innovation Centres to help bridge the gap between fundamental research and commercialisation. The UK Government subsequently funded Innovate UK (then the Technology Strategy Board and now part of UK Research and Innovation) to establish what became known as the Catapult Network, setting up a total of nine centres between 2011 and 2018.

The Catapults individually receive core grant funding from Innovate UK, approved for a five-year period, with a long-term funding split set out through a "thirds" model, to ensure neutrality and independence. The thirds model was recommended to reduce the Catapults' reliance on any part of the innovation ecosystem, with the ambition set out that one-third of funding comes from core grant funding, one-third comes from commercial funding, and one-third comes from collaborative (public and private) research & development funding.

== Centres ==
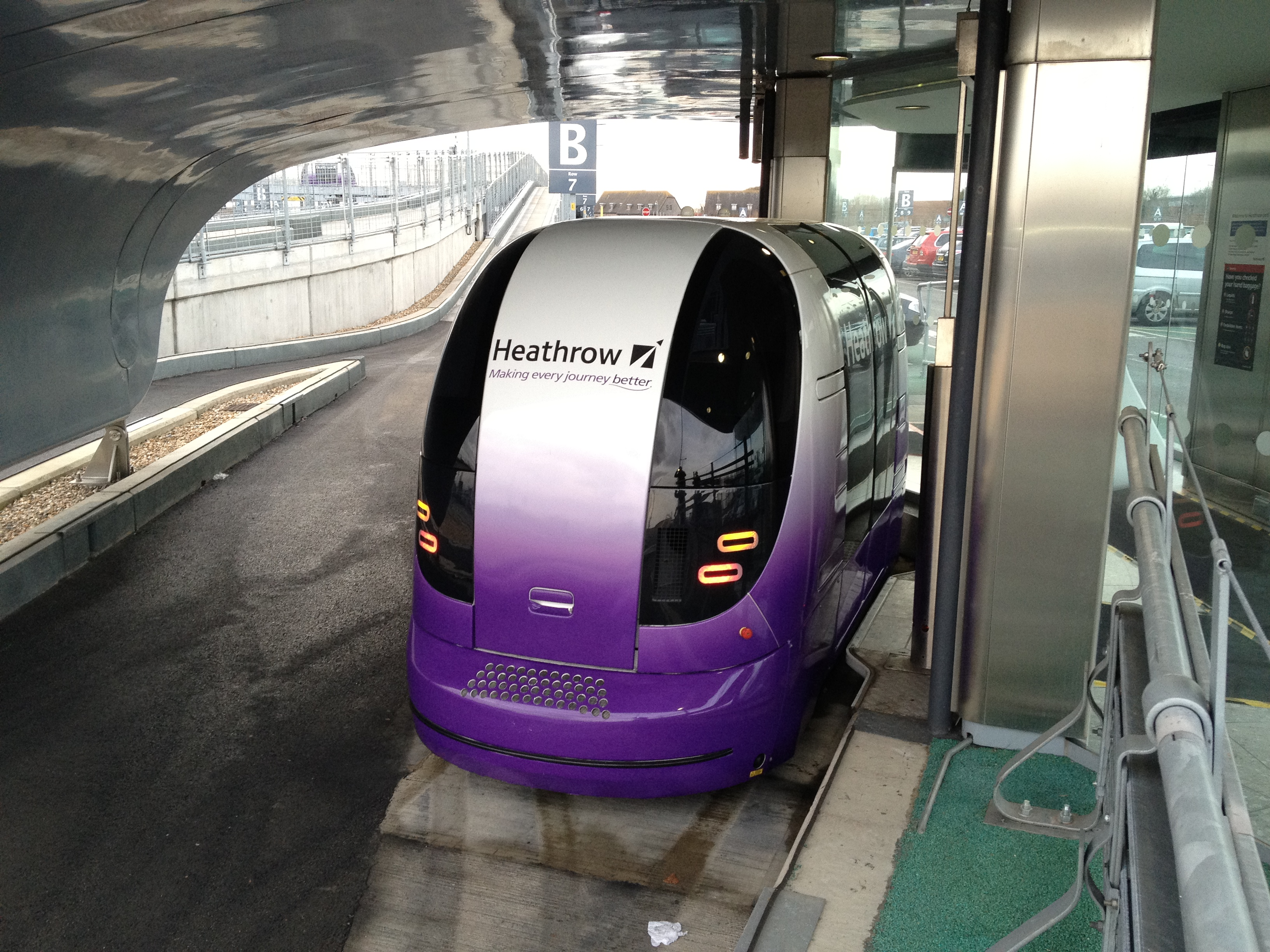
ULTra at Heathrow Airport, an example of an autonomous vehicle

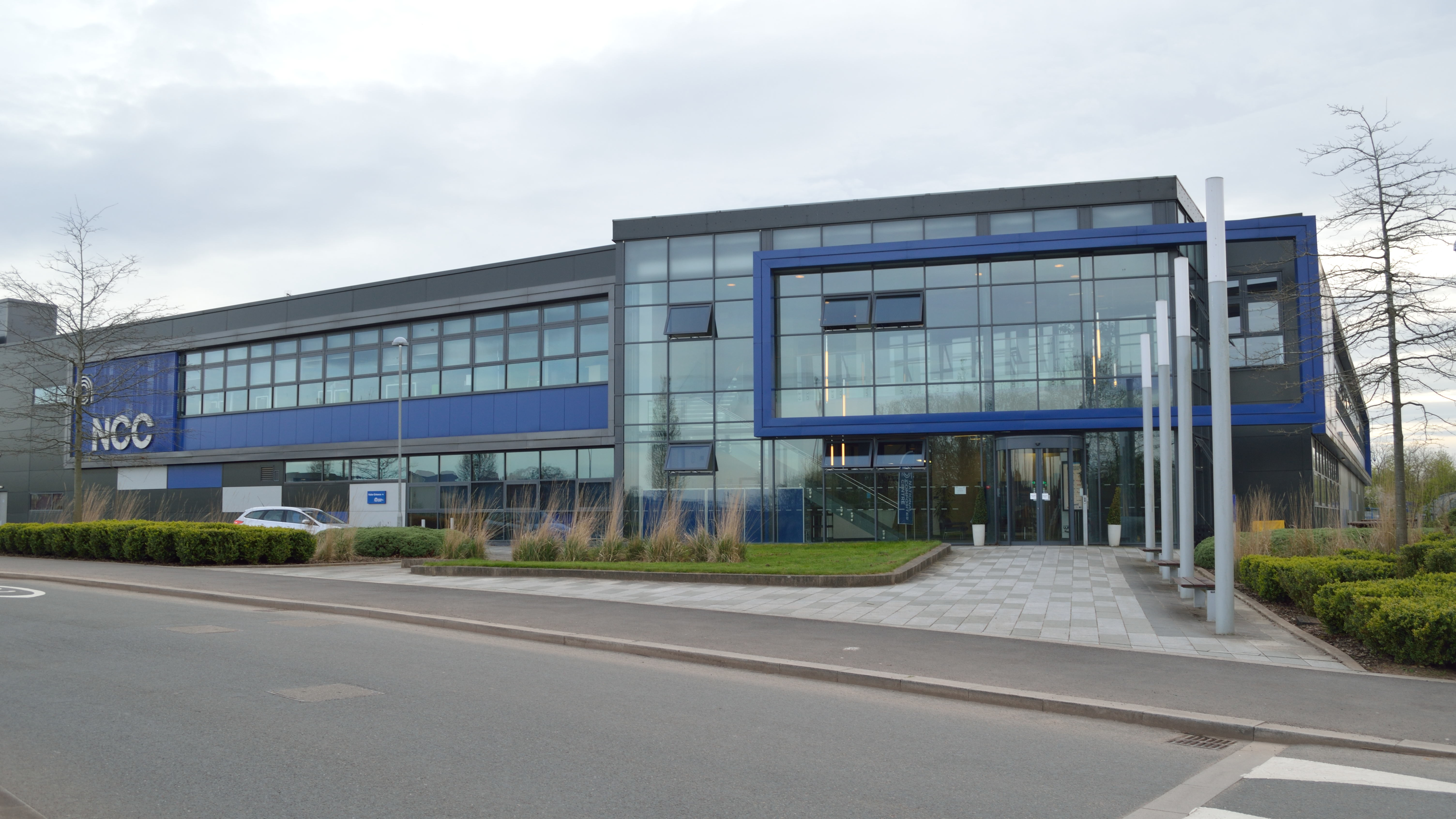
The National Composites Centre at the Bristol and Bath Science Park

The centres operate as nine independent, private, not-for-profit businesses, brought together through collaboration, joint projects. As a whole, they are referred to as the Catapult network.

- Cell and Gene Therapy Catapult – Established in October 2012, headquartered at Guy's Hospital, London and at subsequent locations including Stevenage, Braintree and Edinburgh.
- Connected Places Catapult – Established in April 2019 as a result of merger of the Transport Systems and Future Cities Catapults, located in London, Milton Keynes, and Birmingham.
- Compound Semiconductor Applications Catapult – Established in 2016 in Newport, South Wales and at subsequent locations including Durham, Bristol and Glasgow.
- Digital Catapult – Established in June 2013 in King's Cross, London and at subsequent locations including North East Tees Valley, Bristol and Belfast.
- Energy Systems Catapult – Established in April 2015, headquartered in Birmingham.
- High Value Manufacturing Catapult – Established in October 2011; six manufacturing technology and innovation centres:
  - Advanced Manufacturing Research Centre (AMRC) – at the University of Sheffield site in Rotherham, South Yorkshire.
  - Centre for Process Innovation (CPI) – locations predominantly spread across the North East region and headquartered in Wilton, North Yorkshire.
  - National Composites Centre (NCC) – headquartered in Bristol.
  - National Manufacturing Institute Scotland (NMIS) – headquartered in Glasgow.
  - Manufacturing Technology Centre (MTC) – headquartered in Coventry, West Midlands.
  - Warwick Manufacturing Group (WMG) – headquartered at the University of Warwick, West Midlands.
  - A seventh centre, the Nuclear Advanced Manufacturing Research Centre (NAMRC), closed in 2024 or 2025; some staff were transferred to the University of Sheffield
- Medicines Discovery Catapult – Established in December 2015, headquartered at Alderley Park, Cheshire with an additional location in Manchester; absorbed the former Precision Medicines Catapult in 2017.
- Offshore Renewable Energy Catapult – Established in March 2013; focusing on wind, wave and tidal power, in Glasgow, Blyth, Northumberland, Levenmouth, Grimsby, Pembroke Docks and various other coastal locations across the UK.
- Satellite Applications Catapult – Established in December 2012 at Harwell Science and Innovation Campus, Oxfordshire and subsequently at other sites including Westcott (Buckinghamshire), Durham, Leicester, Portsmouth and Cornwall.

== Network chairs ==
The Catapult Network appoints a chair of the Network every year, chosen from one of the Catapult CEOs. The chair's role is to represent the collective mission of the nine Catapult centres.

Recent chairs have included:

- Katherine Bennett, CEO of the High Value Manufacturing Catapult, in 2023.
- Matthew Brian Durdy, CEO of the Cell and Gene Therapy Catapult, in 2022.
- Dr Jeremy Silver, CEO of the Digital Catapult, in 2021.
- Andrew Jamieson, CEO of the Offshore Renewable Energy Catapult, in 2020.

== Independent reviews ==
The Catapult Network has been subject to various independent reviews, inquiries and reports since its inception. These have included the following:

In November 2017, Ernst & Young published a report commissioned by the then Department for Business, Energy and Industrial Strategy (BEIS), following the completion of the first five-year funding cycle of the first centres established. This report made a series of recommendations to encourage Catapult performance and growth.

In February 2021, the Science and Technology Committee (House of Lords) published a report following their inquiry, Catapults: bridging the gap between research and industry. The report stated "Catapult Network is an integral part of the UK’s innovation system, and the R&D roadmap envisages a key role for the Catapults in attracting increased private sector R&D investment", and made a series of recommendations to Innovate UK, UKRI and BEIS to reduce barriers to Catapult impact and maximise Catapults' potential to drive private investment.

In April 2021, BEIS published a Review of Catapults, confirming that Catapults play an important role in the R&D ecosystem and making 13 recommendations which prioritised greater collaboration between Catapults and an increased role for them in driving equality, diversity and inclusion and skills. This Review was updated in September 2023 to reflect the progress made against the original recommendations.

In May 2023, the Enterprise Research Centre and Innovation Caucus (commissioned by Innovate UK) released two reports based on research into the Catapults' impact. They surveyed more than 300 businesses that had previously worked with Catapults and made a series of findings which demonstrated the Catapults' role in helping to drive business growth in the UK.

== Funding ==
In August 2018, the Government announced funding totalling £780 million to be provided to several of the centres, over the next five years.

In November 2022, during the Autumn Statement, the Government announced a 35% increase in funding for the nine Catapults, compared to the last 5-year funding cycle, totalling a £1.6 billion investment.
