= Exeter Science Park =

Science park in Clyst Honiton, Devon, England

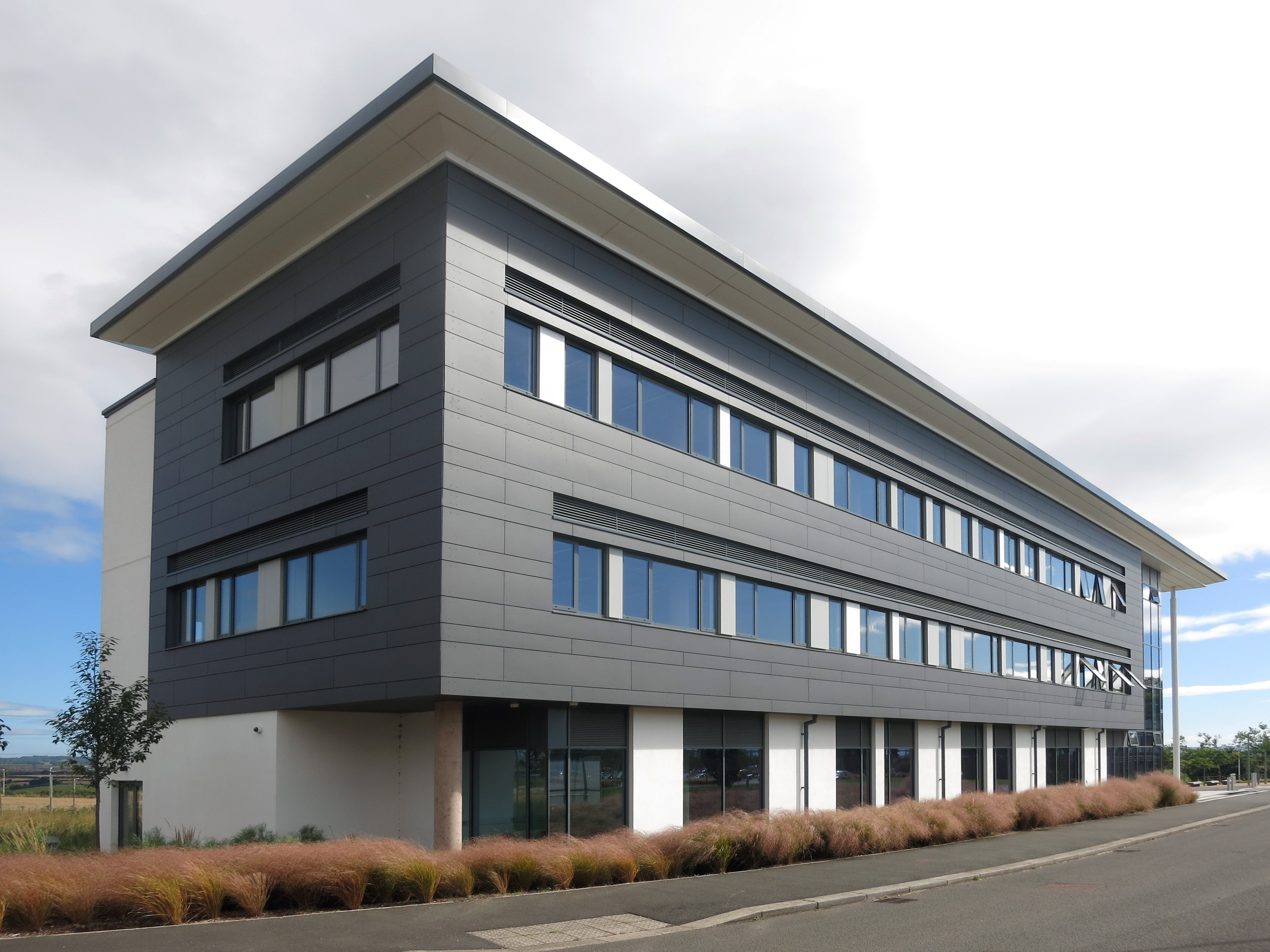
- The first building to be completed at Exeter Science Park

- Location within Devon
- Location: Clyst Honiton, Devon, UK
- Coordinates: 50.7311°N 3.4565°W
- Opening date: 2015
- Developer: Kier Group
- Construction cost: £8 million
- Size: 26 hectares (64 acres)
- Website: exetersciencepark.co.uk

Exeter Science Park is an English centre of activity for businesses in science, technology, engineering, maths and medicine (STEMM).

Exeter Science Park is based on a 26 hectare (64 acre site) at Junction of 29 of the M5 motorway on the edge of the city of Exeter. It was established in 2013 and was officially opened in 2015.

Exeter Science Park Ltd (ESPL), the park developer, has four shareholders: Devon County Council, the University of Exeter, East Devon District Council and Exeter City Council. Its two strategic partners are the Heart of the South West Local Enterprise Partnership (LEP) and the Exeter and East Devon Enterprise Zone.

The building of the Science Park Centre was made possible with shareholder equity from Devon County Council, East Devon District Council, Exeter City Council, and the University of Exeter; the Heart of the South West Local Enterprise Partnership (HotSW LEP) which committed a £4.5m loan from the Growing Places Fund; and a £1million grant from the Regional Growth Fund.

Exeter Science Park's Grow-on Buildings were partly funded by £4.5m from the HotSW LEP Growth Deal Funding. The HotSW LEP also provided £2.5m local Government funding towards the Environmental Futures Campus.

The Ada Lovelace Building is partly funded by £5.5 million from the Heart of the South West Local Enterprise Partnership's Growth Deal Funding. In addition to this, East Devon District Council's Cabinet invested £1.1m in the development of the building in conjunction with Devon County Council as part of the Exeter and East Devon Enterprise Zone programme.

Funding for the George Parker Bidder building was secured in August 2020 from the Government's 'Getting Building Fund' and allocated to Exeter Science Park by the Heart of the South West Local Enterprise Partnership (HotSW LEP) from its £35.4 million share of the national pot. The building was one of the first Getting Building Fund projects to begin construction in the area.

Buildings at the Science Park include provision of laboratories, offices, meeting rooms and hotdesking facilities. It is also home to a café which is open to the public.

In 2021, the University of Exeter transferred the business activity of its Innovation Centre to Exeter Science Park and released £2.25m funding to support the provision of innovation services by SETsquared Exeter over the next 18 years.

The park is being developed around four clusters and once complete, it is anticipated it will comprise a million square feet of accommodation and employ around 3,000 people.

== Occupants ==
As of December 2022, the park has 45 tenants. These include CEFAS, Securious, Attomarker, Vivax Metrotech, Boomi, Theta Technologies, Oxitech, Diagnexia UK Limited, Klarian Ltd., the University of Exeter and Joiin.

In 2016, the Met Office took delivery of an IT hall and neighbouring office building at the Science Park. The IT hall housed a supercomputer, the Met Office's third, but is no longer used for this purpose. As of February 2025, the Met Office is looking to sell the whole site.

== Redhayes Bridge ==
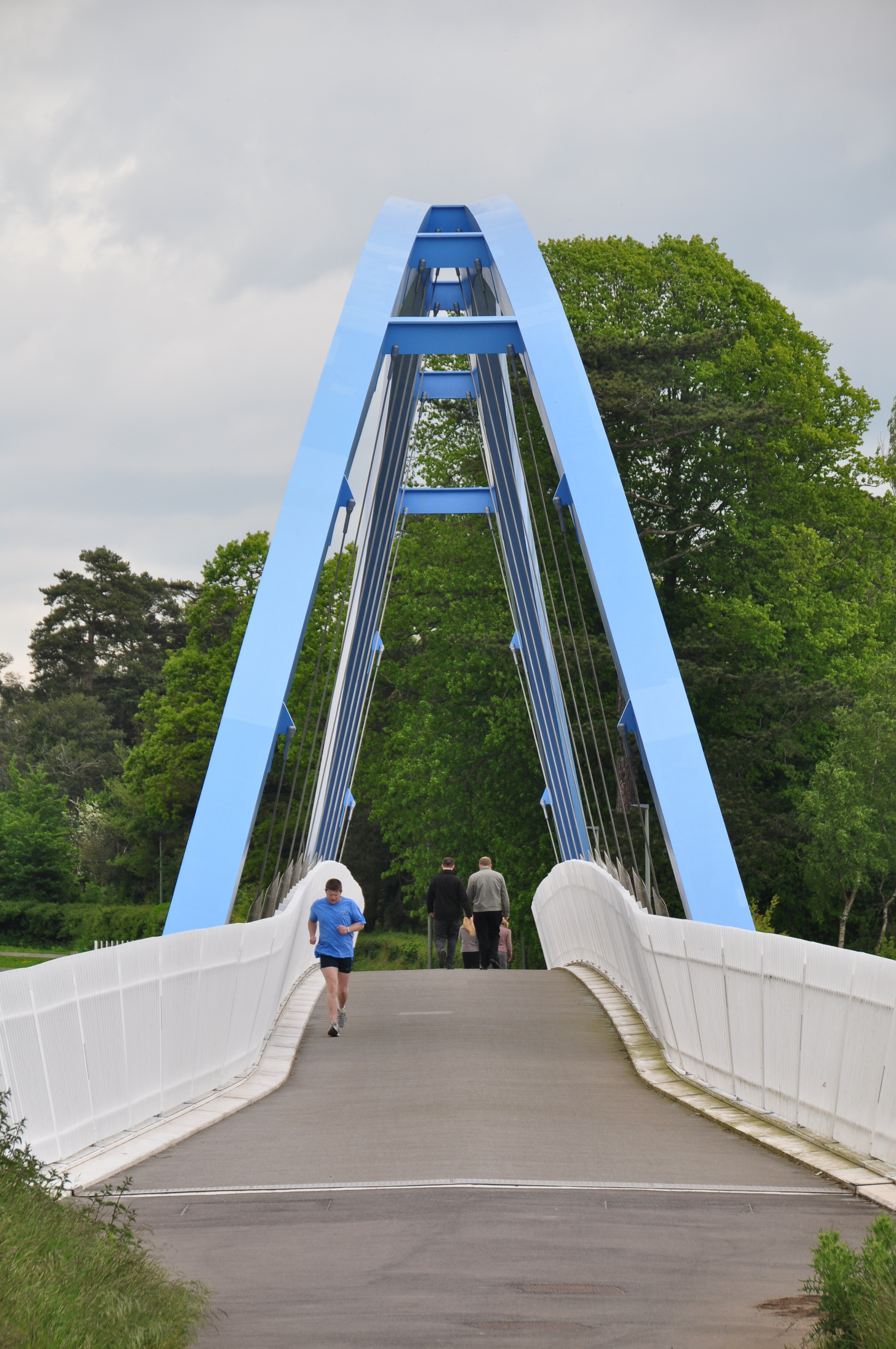
Redhayes Bridge

The Redhayes pedestrian and cycle bridge over the M5 evolved from a study looking at green infrastructure in Exeter and East Devon that led to a successful bid for £5.5 million to the Community Infrastructure Fund. The bridge links Blackhorse Lane to Hollow Lane, beside the park. It was opened on 20 July 2011 by Transport Minister Norman Baker. The bridge won a British Construction Industry Award in 2011.

It is named after the Redhayes House which stood on the site now occupied by the Science Park. The property, which was constructed circa 1900 was destroyed by fire in 1990.

== See also ==
- List of science parks in the United Kingdom
