= Birmingham Science Park Aston =

Science park in Birmingham, England

Coordinates: 52.488°N 1.886°W

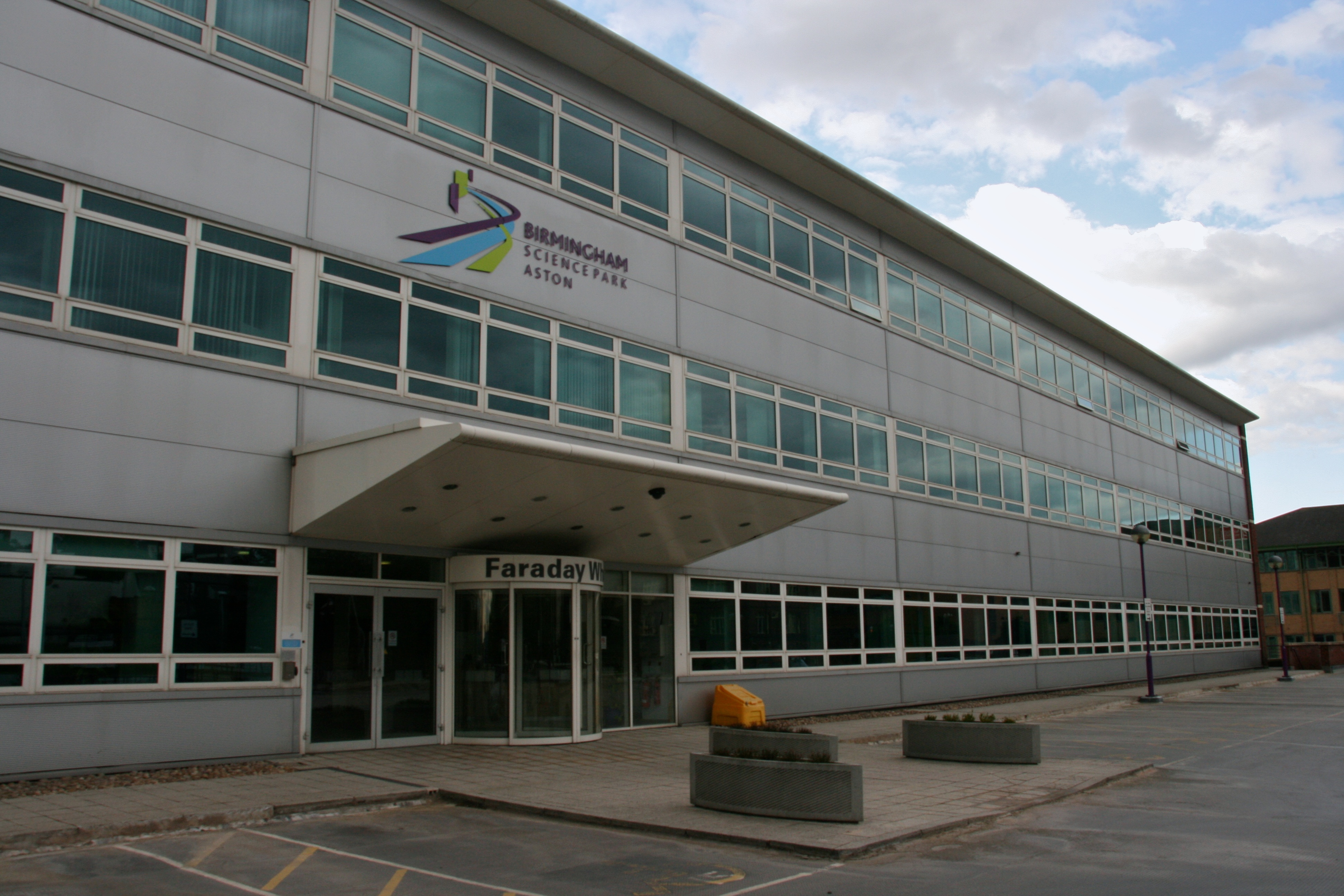
Aston Science Park

Birmingham Science Park Aston, formerly known as Aston Science Park, is a science park located in Birmingham City Centre, United Kingdom. It is located adjacent to Aston University and the Eastside area.

== Description ==
Birmingham Science Park Aston (BSPA) was founded in 1982 and as such is the UK's third oldest science park. Located in its urban setting within central Birmingham, it offers 250,000 sq ft of accommodation over 14 acres.

== Two campuses ==
BSPA is wholly owned by Birmingham City Council. To pave the way for a £35 million development zone, it is now presented as two campuses; the Science & Technology Campus and the Innovation Birmingham Campus.

=== The Science and Technology Campus ===
The Science & Technology Campus encompasses a range of multi-occupied and headquarters style single occupancy buildings owned by Birmingham City Council and serviced by the Innovation Birmingham team. The Innovation Birmingham Campus is working in partnership with a wide range of stakeholders to help shape the Smart Cities agenda and drive innovation-led regeneration across Greater Birmingham. Faraday Wharf – the flagship building on the campus – incorporates 70 office suites specifically designed for growing technology businesses.

=== The Innovation Birmingham Campus ===
The Innovation Birmingham team describes itself as a one-stop-shop for innovators, entrepreneurs and investors looking to develop or fund tech start-ups with high growth potential.

==== The Innovation Birmingham strategy ====
The Innovation Birmingham strategy is focused on a service offering for founders of new technology ventures, as well as more established tech businesses. The campus facilities include the Entrepreneurs for the Future (e4f) multi-occupancy start-up centre with hot-desking facilities and a wide range of office units (115-4,000 sq ft) within the rest of Faraday Wharf.

=== Entrepreneurs for the Future centre (e4f) ===
This ERDF supported incubation centre is specifically focused on creating new innovative technology ventures. As the companies grow, they are then able to graduate into larger premises within Faraday Wharf, or elsewhere on the Science Park. Since establishing in November 2009, e4f has supported the creation of over 100 new technology companies.

Within the first nine months of being enrolled onto e4f, the Innovation Birmingham team and mentor base works with the new business founders to create a value proposition, assisting with the process of becoming revenue generating and/or securing investment funding. Start-ups in e4f can take advantage of well-established links with funds such as Finance Birmingham's Tech Fund.

== West Midlands Regional Innovation Centre ==
A new regional hub funded by Climate-KIC – Europe's largest public-private partnership focused on tackling climate change – was launched by Innovation Birmingham in 2014. The West Midlands Regional Innovation Centre receives in excess of €2 million of funding per annum, spread across a number of local initiatives. Innovation Birmingham has created 10 new jobs to run the centre.

The centre's main initiatives are; Pioneers into Practice – a grant-funded European exchange programme for low carbon specialists; the Low Carbon Accelerator Programme for start-up businesses; and a range of grant-funded education programmes aimed at students, professionals and organisations.

== LAUNCH ==
Over 20 gaming companies have already been nurtured in the e4f centre, with many more established studios relocating to the Innovation Birmingham Campus over recent years.

The Innovation Birmingham team run a year-round programme of events for those working in the gaming or mobile app industries. The events are also targeted at students, graduates and anyone looking to launch a career in gaming.

There are at least seven LAUNCH events per year, with speakers drawn from gaming companies, such as Codemasters, Microsoft, Playground Games, Rebellion Developments and Vodafone Games.

== £35 million development zone ==
The £35 million development zone will enable significant expansion of the Innovation Birmingham Campus. The two-acre plot is situated next to Faraday Wharf, at the gateway to the Eastside knowledge quarter. It is accessed off Holt Street and A38 Aston Expressway. The site is one of 26 covered by Greater Birmingham and Solihull LEP's Enterprise Zone. The collection of buildings will be among the first within the Enterprise Zone to get underway, enabling future occupiers to benefit from Business Rates relief.

Innovation Birmingham is developing the new buildings in partnership with Stourport-on-Severn headquartered Thomas Vale Construction Ltd, which is part of one of the world's leading construction groups, Bouygues Construction. Three to five buildings are proposed in total, delivering 11,500 sq m (120,000 sq ft) of new space for Birmingham’s tech community.

== iCentrumTM ==
The first phase of the development zone will be the delivery of the £8 million iCentrumTM building. It will encompass 3,874 sq m (41,700 sq ft) of open work space promoting mobile working, a new Serendip incubator offering, self-contained offices, tech demonstration and event facilities and a café. The building is being developed speculatively and will be available for occupation in March 2016.

=== Serendip incubator ===
A new tech incubator concept will be delivered within the iCentrumTM building, called "Serendip". It will promote unique collaborations across sectors, supported by corporate mentors from: Built Environment; Internet of Things; Intelligent Mobility; and Digital Health

== History ==
Birmingham Science Park Aston is owned by Birmingham Technology Ltd., which was jointly owned by Lloyds TSB, Birmingham City Council and Aston University, until 2008. During 2008 there was restructuring, and the science park is now wholly owned by Birmingham City Council. Aston University continue to sit on the board and provide services such as management support and equity capital to firms at the science park. The science park was opened in 1983 and was designed to overcome the reluctance of London-based firms to invest outside of South East England.

The first building to be opened was the Business and Innovation Centre, in 1983 by Prince Philip, Duke of Edinburgh. The building was refurbished in 1994. Within one year, there were fifteen companies on site and ten years later, there were 80 companies on site. By 2001, there were 1,400 employees and 110 companies on site. Visitors to the site included then-Prime Minister Margaret Thatcher in 1985, Prince Edward, Duke of Kent in the same year, Charles, Prince of Wales in 1988, European Commissioner Bruce Milan in 1989, Jeremy Morse in 1990, chairman of the TSB Group Plc. Nicholas Goodison in 1992, Patricia Hewitt in 2001, Digby Jones, Frederick Crawford and former Polish Prime Minister Jerzy Buzek.

== Access ==
The Science Park is near the end of the A38(M) motorway – which takes traffic from the M6 into Birmingham City Centre. It is located alongside the A4540 road, on a site adjacent to the Aston University campus and the Eastside area. The Digbeth Branch Canal runs through it.

== See also ==
- List of science parks in the United Kingdom
