= Ruth McKernan =

British neuroscientist

Dr Ruth Mitchell McKernan CBE
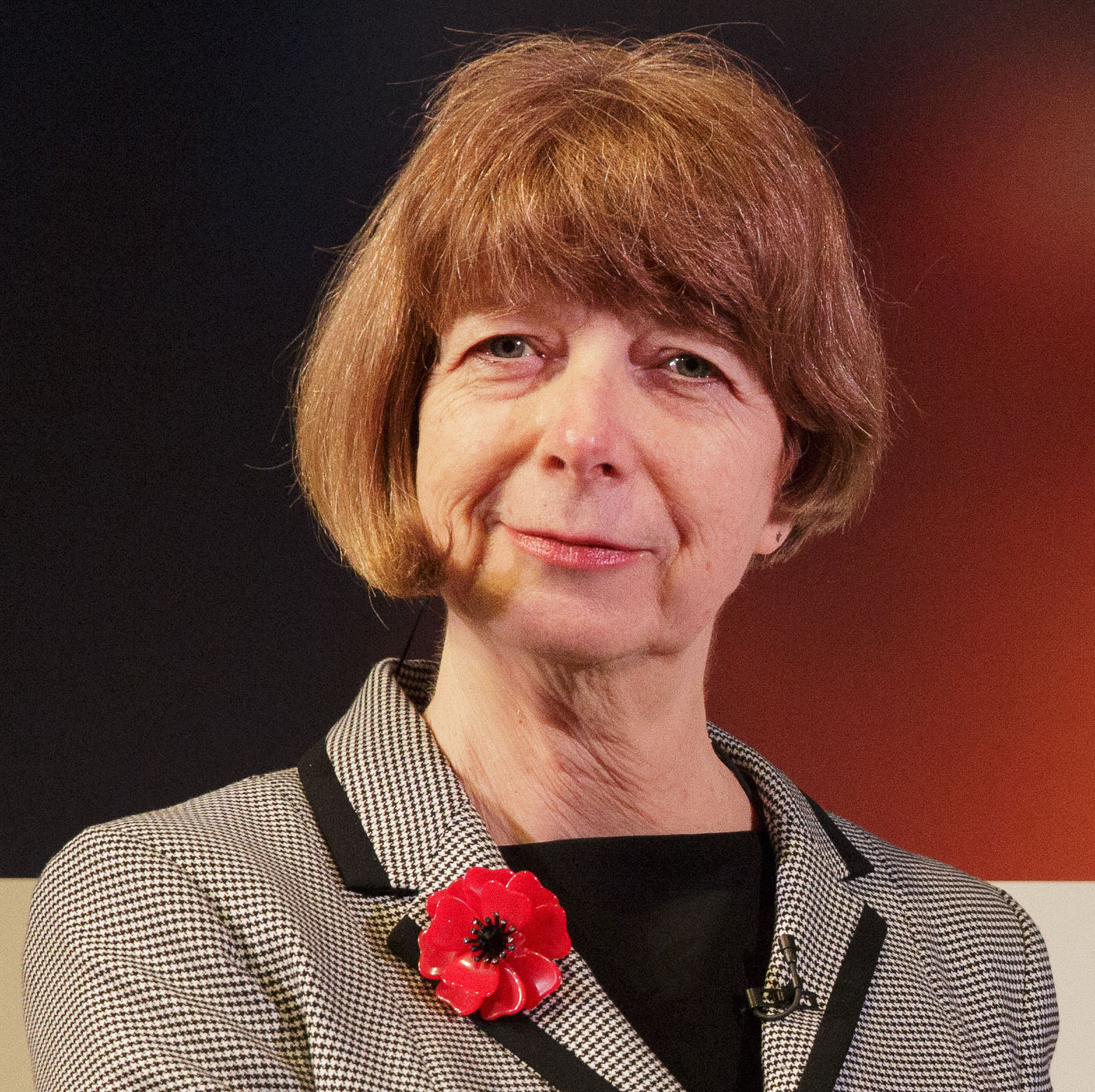
- Born: March 1958 (age 68)
- Education: King's College London
- Writing career
- Genres: Academic and Popular Science
- Subject: Neuroscience
- Notable work: Billy's Halo

Dr. Ruth Mitchell McKernan CBE (born 1958) is a British neuroscientist and business executive. She is known for her work on ligand-gated ion channels and for services to business and innovation, including as chief executive of Innovate UK from 2015 to 2018. She is a founding director of Astronautx, a start-up researching dementia treatments targeting astrocytes.

== Career ==
McKernan was born in March 1958. She studied biochemistry and pharmacology at undergraduate level, graduating from King's College London with first class honours. She earned her PhD researching anti-depressant drugs at the University of London in the Institute of Psychiatry. McKernan then held research positions at St Mary's Hospital medical school on a British Heart Foundation scholarship, before moving to the United States in 1985 to become a Fulbright scholar at University of California, San Diego. In 1987 she moved to Merck where she worked for 18 years, leading their Neuroscience Research Centre from 2001, before moving to Pfizer in 2005 where she held a number of senior roles including Senior Vice President and Chief Scientific Officer of the company's Neusentis unit.

Returning to the United Kingdom, McKernan was Chief Executive of government-funded Innovate UK from 2015 to 2018, where she led the development of the Industrial Strategy Challenge Fund and promoted the importance of greater diversity in innovation. She announced her intention to step down as Chief Executive in 2018, two years before the end of the five-year appointment, stating "the introduction of UK Research and Innovation is the natural transition point and an opportunity for a new leader to refine the organisation".

McKernan is a trustee of Alzheimer's Research UK and honorary fellow of the British Pharmaceutical Society.

She is a venture partner at the Dementia Discovery Fund (DDF), a specialist venture capital fund which is part of SV Health Investors, whose ultimate controlling party is Kate Bingham. In 2019, she was a founding director of Astronautx Limited, a start-up company formed by DDF to conduct research into dementia treatments by correcting disrupted brain physiology.

In November 2019 it was announced that McKernan had been elected as the Chair of the UK BioIndustry Association.

== Awards and honours ==
In 1993, McKernan received the ABSW Science Writers' Award for her science articles in The Independent.

She was appointed CBE in the 2013 Birthday Honours for services to business and innovation. She was elected a Fellow of the Academy of Medical Sciences in 2015.

In 2018, McKernan received an honorary degree from The University of Bradford.

In 2025, McKernan received an honorary degree from the University of Strathclyde.

== Publications ==
Alongside publishing more than 120 scientific papers and 15 patents, McKernan wrote Billy's Halo, published in 2006 and described as part memoir, part popular science. The book describes the death of her father and was shortlisted for the Mind awards in 2007. McKernan also writes comment pieces in national newspapers on the role of academia.

== Personal life ==
McKernan's interests include science-writing and gardening. She also acts as a spokesperson for Women in Innovation.
