= Plymouth Science Park =

Science and technology park in Devon, England

Coordinates: 50.4175°N 4.1089°W

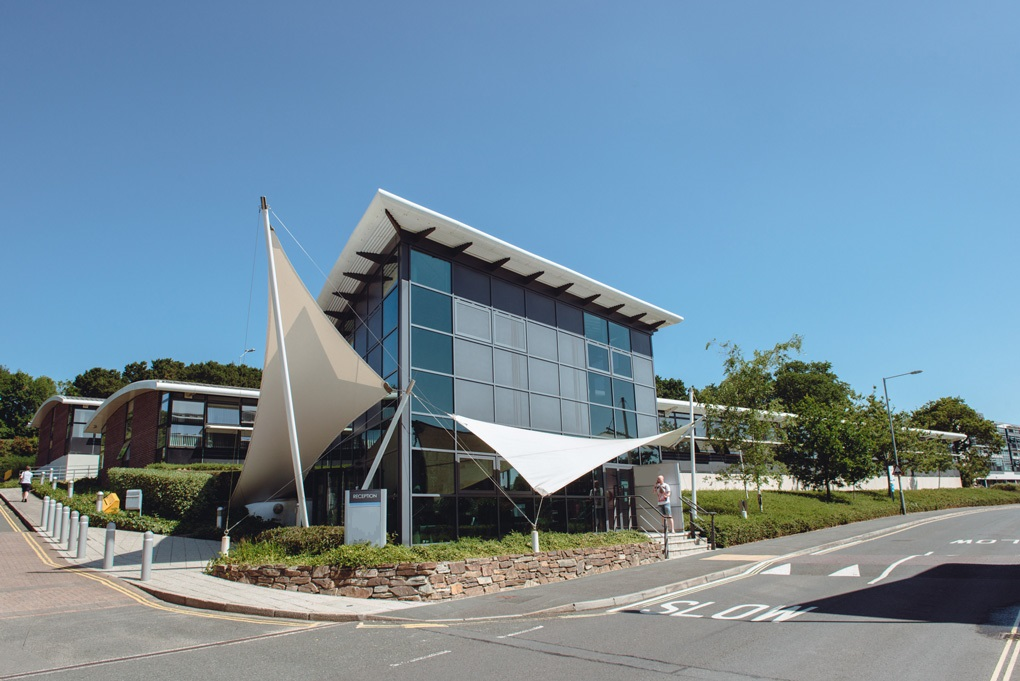
Plymouth Science Park

Plymouth Science Park, previously known as Tamar Science Park, is a science and technology park located in Plymouth, Devon, in southern England.

The park was incorporated in 1995, with two principal stakeholders and founding partners – Plymouth City Council and the University of Plymouth. The science park is situated to the north of Plymouth at Derriford, 7 km from the city centre. The site is on 25 acres 150,000 sq ft (14,000 m^{2}) of occupiable space, with 6.2 acres still to be developed.

== The park ==
Plymouth Science Park was established in 1996 under the auspices of Plymouth City Council and the University of Plymouth. The park is being developed in several phases and is located in an area of 25 acres off Derriford Road, Plymouth. It adjoins Derriford Hospital, Plymouth University and the University of St Mark & St John. It offers 150,000 sq ft (14,000 m^{2}) of office accommodation as well as wet and dry laboratory space. The park was officially renamed the Plymouth Science Park in 2014 and is the largest science park in the south of England.

== Facilities ==
Plymouth Science Park has an advisory board made up of experienced business advisors; tenants of the park can obtain up to 100 hours per year of business advice free of charge. Tenants can also be helped with their finance and investment needs through several initiatives such as "investment days" and access to various government investment schemes.

The park provides suitable accommodation for conferences, lectures and meetings, catering for up to one hundred people. A fibreoptic network allows superfast and ultrafast broadband, and there is an on-site, Tier 3 data centre. There is a virtual office, office pod and expansion space, and on-site teams to help with information and communications technology, facilities and the organisation of events. There is a bistro on-site, CCTV system and twenty-four-hour security.

== Tenants ==
In 2016, over 120 businesses were located in the park, mainly being in the fields of life science, digital technology and e-commerce. The tenants have a total annual turnover of £100 million, and vary from one-man start-ups to multi-national corporations.

The first four stages of the park have been completed. The Hyperbaric Medical Centre was the first undertaking to take up residence on the Park, along with the Diving Diseases Research Centre in 1996. Two years later saw phase 1, the opening of the Innovation and Technology Transfer Centre (ITTC). Phase 2 followed, with the opening of another ITTC in 2002. Phase 3 saw the building of the headquarters of Devon and Cornwall Business Link and three other lettable buildings. In 2008, phase 4 followed with the addition of further lettable area, the Data Centre and the bistro. Phase 5 and 6 are to follow, with phase 5 expected to cost around £7 million. HLM Architects are the lead consultant for phase 5 and BAM Construction (part of BAM Nuttall) are the contractors. In 2016, renewable energy WITT and Antony Jinman's business Education Through Expeditions took up residence at the Park and Peninsula College of Medicine and Dentistry a Medical and Dental school is located there.

== See also ==
- List of science parks in the United Kingdom
