= D band (waveguide) =

Radio frequency

Waveguide D band
- Frequency range: 110–170 GHz
- Wavelength range: 2.73–1.76 mm
- Related bands: mm (IEEE); EHF (ITU)

The waveguide D band is the range of radio frequencies from 110 GHz to 170 GHz in the electromagnetic spectrum, corresponding to the recommended frequency band of operation of the WR6 and WR7 waveguides. These frequencies are equivalent to wavelengths between 2.7 mm and 1.8 mm. The D band is in the EHF range of the radio spectrum.

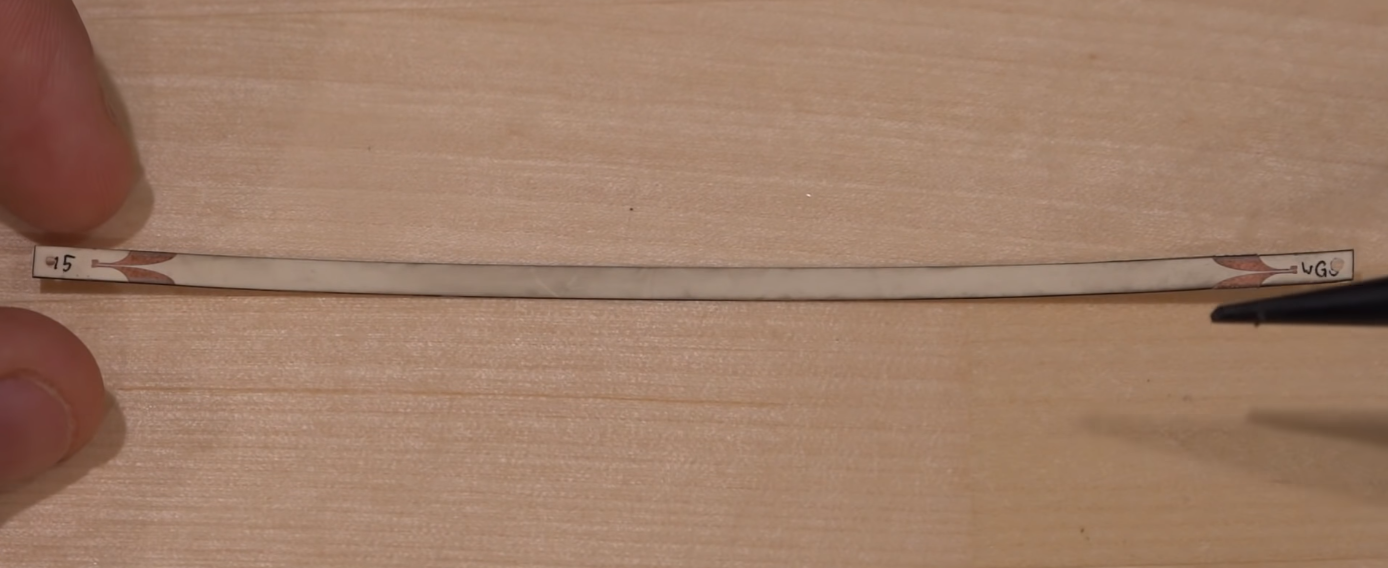
PCB D band waveguide
