= Bristol and Bath Science Park =

Science park near Bristol, England

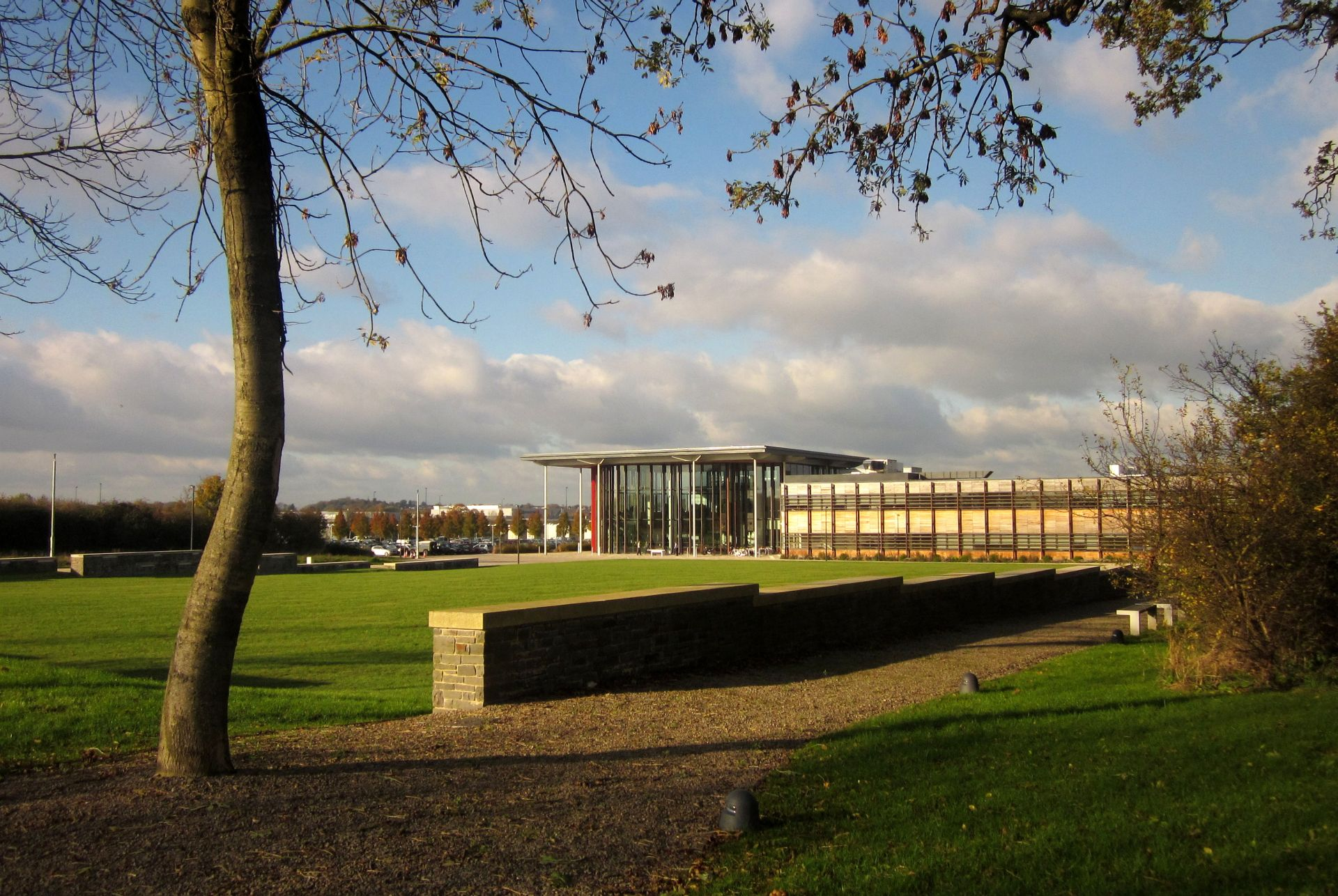
- The main building at the Bristol and Bath Science Park, called the "Forum"

- Location within Gloucestershire
- Location: Dirac Crescent, Emersons Green, South Gloucestershire, England
- Coordinates: 51.5008°N 2.4777°W
- Opening date: 2011
- Construction cost: £300 million
- Manager: Bonnie Dean
- Owner: University of Bath and South Gloucestershire Council
- Size: 59 acres (24 ha)
- Website: www.bbsp.co.uk

Bristol and Bath Science Park (BBSP) is a science park in Emersons Green, South Gloucestershire, England, north-east of Bristol and north-west of Bath. It cost £300 million to build and is expected to employ about 6,000 when fully developed. The park was opened on 26 September 2011, 25 years after it was originally proposed. The site covers 59 acres, half of which were developed by 2013; the whole site is expected to be complete by 2033.

The main building comprises the Forum, which includes a reception area and two areas for businesses: the Innovation Centre for emerging businesses and the Grow On Centre for expanded businesses. The park's largest tenant is the National Composites Centre.

== History ==
First proposed in 1986, the Bristol and Bath Science Park was officially opened on 26 September 2011. The park's development was a collaboration of universities, the South West of England Regional Development Agency and Quantum Property Partnership.

It cost £300 million to build, and was intended to draw technology firms to the South West, giving them a space to develop technical designs for production. The site covers 59 acres, and is expected to employ 6,000. By 2013, 29 acres of the site had been developed, leaving a wide open common where children come to skateboard and play frisbee. The original intention was to create a building every year in the hope that more businesses would move in, but this was suspended after two years due to a recession. The remainder of the site is expected to take between 15 and 20 years to develop.

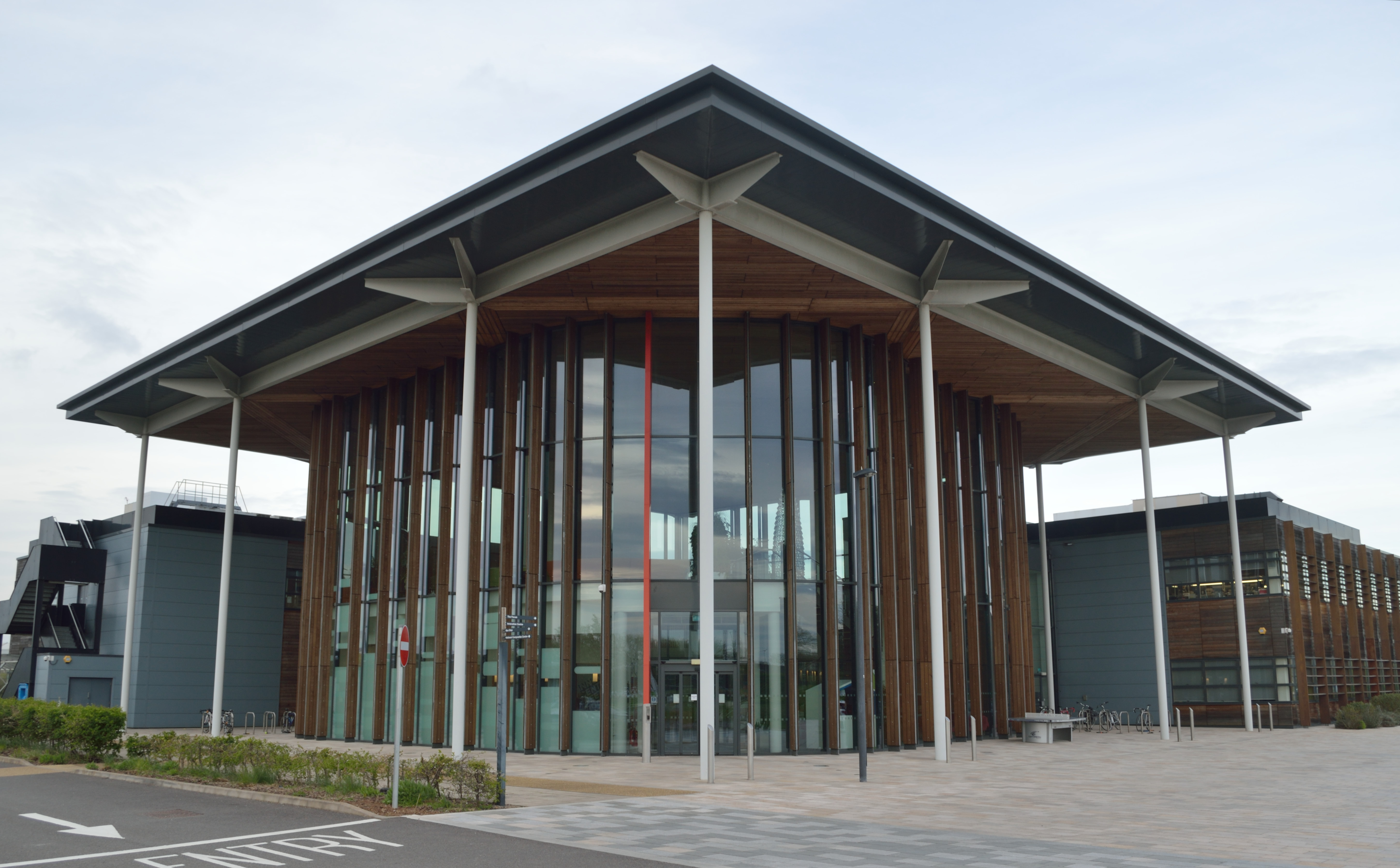
The Forum

The main building includes the "Forum", which comprises the reception area, meeting spaces and restaurants. It also includes the "Innovation Centre" for new business, and the "Grow On Centre" for subsequent expansion. The ground floor of the Innovation Centre was full by November 2012, and the second floor was half full by February 2013. By 2016, 40 companies were based at the site.

The park's largest tenant is the National Composites Centre, a carbon fibre research centre opened by Vince Cable in November 2011, which is part of the government's High Value Manufacturing Catapult initiative. The centre was granted £28 million of government funding in 2012 and a further £65.4m in 2018.

In September 2018, the University of Bath and South Gloucestershire Council jointly purchased the park from the Department for Business, Energy and Industrial Strategy (BEIS). The purchase price was reported to be £18 million.

In January 2019, a major expansion of the National Composites Centre, under the Airbus Wing of Tomorrow programme, was agreed upon.

== Green energy ==
The park's first two buildings have 200 square metres of solar panels, which aimed to provide between 10 and 15% of the building's energy requirements. The park also includes a solar water heating system and a woodchip biomass boiler. The Forum building houses the world's largest solar-powered chandelier, designed by Luke Jerram.
