= European Lead Factory =

The European Lead Factory is a public-private partnership that aims to accelerate early drug discovery in Europe. The European Lead Factory is funded by the Innovative Medicines Initiative and consists of a pan-European consortium that includes 7 pharmaceutical companies as well as partners from academia and small and medium-sized enterprises (SMEs).

== Drug discovery platform ==
The European Lead Factory is operational since 2013 and consists of two main components: the Joint European Compound Library and the European Screening Centre. Together these elements provide a platform for pharmaceutical researchers in Europe to identify drug discovery starting points, by connecting innovative drug targets to high-quality small molecules. The result is defined in a ‘hit list’: a number of compounds that show affinity for the target. The compounds on those lists can either be used as probes to better understand biological pathways or as starting points for lead discovery efforts for novel drugs. These hits can be further optimised outside of the European Lead Factory, for affinity but also for drug-like properties as selectivity, solubility and metabolism in the human body. The ultimate goal is that these candidate drugs will solve unmet medical needs when fully approved as drug by the authorities.

== Open innovation ==
The Joint European Compound Library has a collection of around 500,000 chemical compounds selected from private company collections and complemented by the novel molecules synthesised by the European Lead Factory chemistry partners. European researchers from academia as well as SMEs and patient organisations submit their biological target to be screened against the compound collection by the European Lead Factory researchers by means of industrial standard high-throughput screening.
