= Innovate UK =

British government council

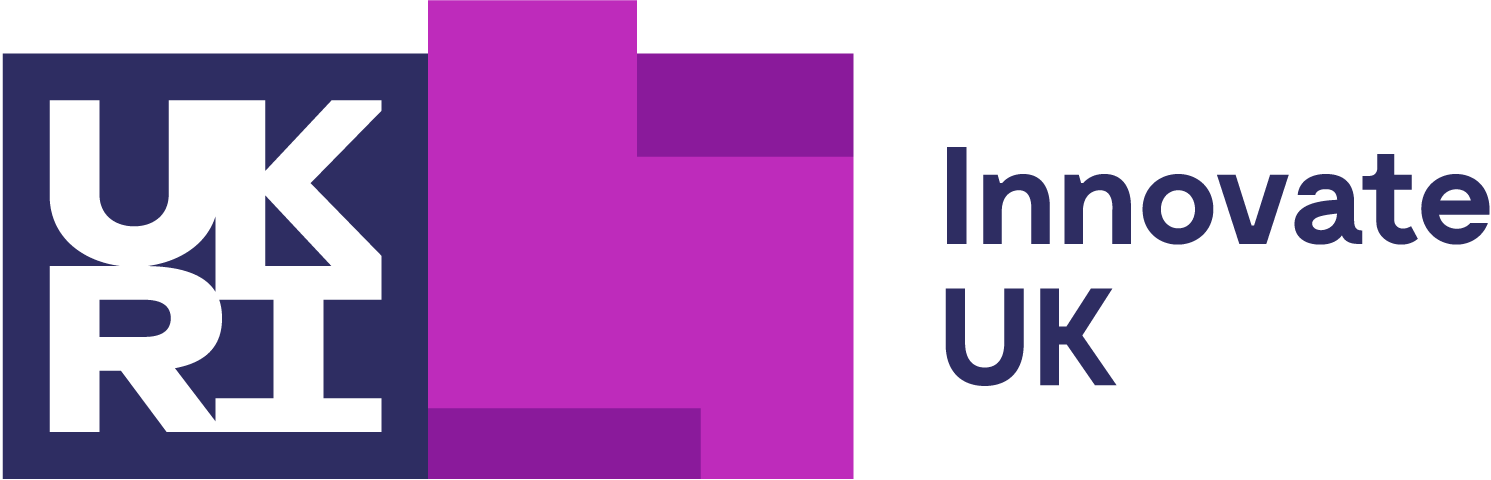

Council overview
- Formed: 2004; 22 years ago
- Status: Council within UK Research and Innovation
- Headquarters: Swindon, Wiltshire, England
- Annual budget: £919 million (FY2024/25)
- Ministers responsible: Liz Kendall MP, Secretary of State for Science, Innovation and Technology; Patrick Vallance, Minister of State for Science, Research and Innovation
- Council executive: Tom Adeyoola, Executive Chair
- Parent department: Department for Science, Innovation and Technology
- Parent body: UK Research and Innovation
- Website: ukri.org/innovate-uk

Innovate UK is a council of UK Research and Innovation (UKRI), a non-departmental public body sponsored by the Department for Business, Innovation, Science and Trade, responsible for funding and supporting organisations to make new products and services.

== History ==
Innovate UK was initially an advisory body – the Technology Strategy Board – established in 2004, within the Department of Trade and Industry (DTI), before becoming an independent body in July 2007 after the reorganisation of the DTI into the Department for Innovation, Universities and Skills (DIUS) and the Department for Business, Enterprise and Regulatory Reform (BERR) under Gordon Brown's government.

The original Technology Strategy Board had its roots in the Innovation Review published by the DTI in December 2003, and the Lambert Review. This reconfigured the major funding mechanism as the Collaborative Research and Development Technology Programme, transformed the pre-existing Faraday Partnerships into Knowledge Transfer Networks, renamed the Teaching Company Scheme as Knowledge Transfer Partnerships and set up an Advisory Board made up of 12 people from business, venture capital and regional government. These changes all took place in 2004, with the Advisory Board being appointed in October of that year.

In the 2006 budget, Gordon Brown announced the intention to set up the Technology Strategy Board as a "non-departmental public body" operating at "arm's length" from the UK Government. It was decided to locate the new organisation in Swindon, and to recruit a team primarily with business experience.

In August 2014, the organisation adopted the name Innovate UK, and began a transition to use the new name in all its communications. However, the legal name of the organisation continued to be the "Technology Strategy Board".

Under the Higher Education and Research Act 2017, effective April 2018, Innovate UK became a council of the newly established UK Research and Innovation (UKRI) organisation.

In November 2021, the Knowledge Transfer Network re-branded as Innovate UK KTN as part of a reorganisation of the KTN through which it has increased cooperation with Innovate UK, while remaining a separate legal entity. The re-naming of Innovate UK KTN was aimed at accelerating benefits for UK businesses by enabling greater strategic alignment with Innovate UK. Innovate UK KTN's role within the Innovate UK group is to "connect innovators with new partners and new opportunities beyond their existing thinking – accelerating ambitious ideas into real-world solutions." Innovate UK KTN operates as a private company limited by guarantee without share capital, with its sole member being UK Research and Innovation, a non-departmental public body. The current Innovate UK KTN Interim CEO is Jon Kingsbury. In 2024, Innovate UK KTN changed its name to Innovate UK Business Connect.

In 2022 the Knowledge Transfer Network (KTN) was fully absorbed into Innovate UK, prompting a rebrand and organisational integration aimed at aligning KTN’s identity with its parent agency

From 2020, Innovate UK was the delivery party of Ofwat's Innovation Fund, which aims to unlock and scale innovations that tackle water challenges across multiple different sectors in England and Wales. Innovate UK stepped back from the role in 2026 in order to better align with the UK Government’s new industrial strategy.

== Key people ==
The current Executive Chair is Tom Adeyoola, following Stella Peace's interim role after Indro Mukerjee’s retirement in October 2024. Mukerjee was preceded by Ian Campbell who served as interim executive chair from early 2018 until summer of 2020; Campbell was preceded by neuroscientist Ruth McKernan, who held the chief executive post for the three years leading up to the transition to UK Research and Innovation.

The first CEO was Iain Gray CBE who had previously been the Managing Director and General Manager at Airbus UK. He stepped down in 2014 and subsequently became Director of Aerospace at Cranfield University.

== See also ==
- EngineeringUK
- Foundation for Science and Technology
- Institution of Engineering and Technology
- Institute of Knowledge Transfer
- NESTA
