= Science park =

Area designed to promote science or technology business development

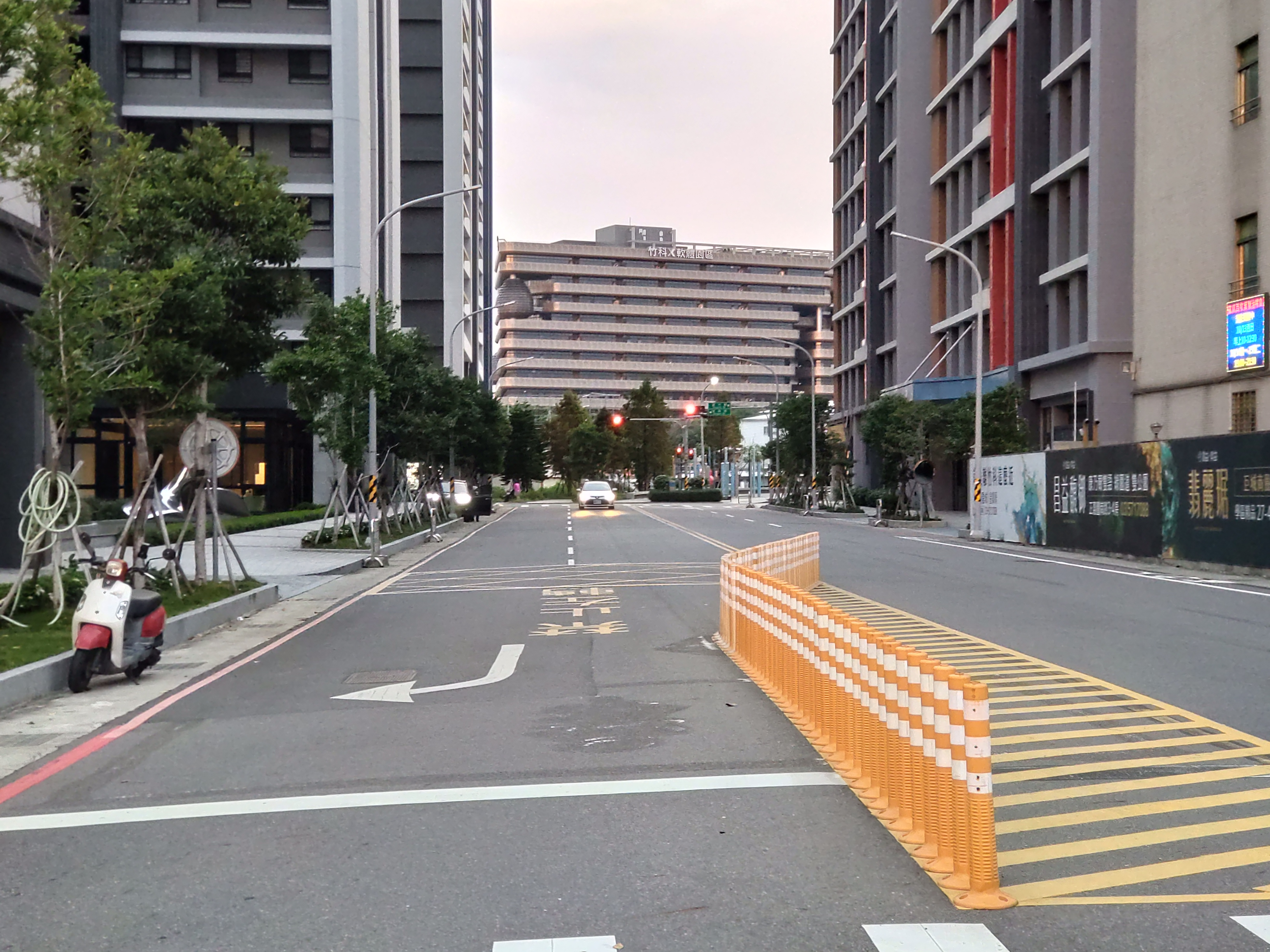
Taiwan science park

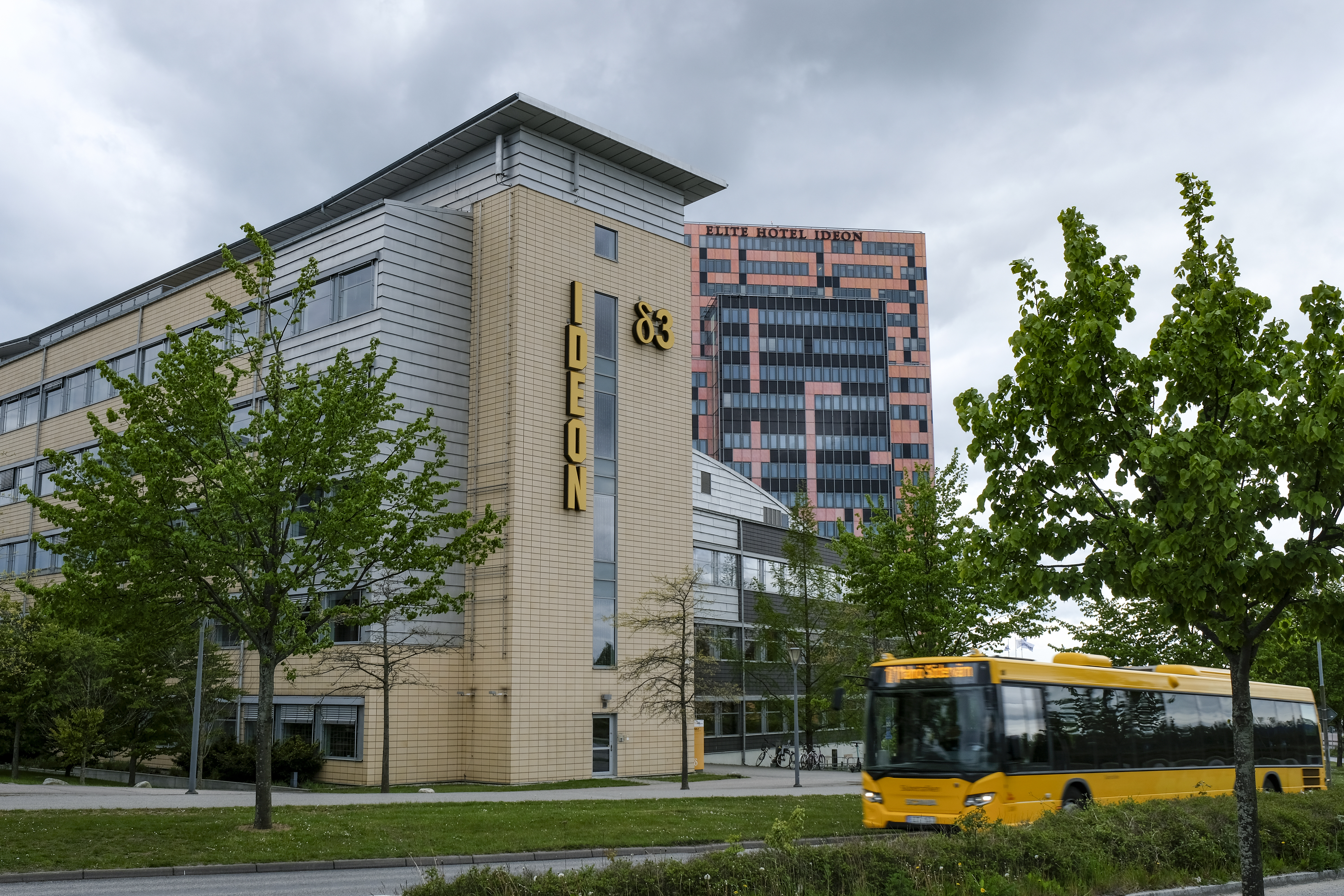
Ideon, the largest science park in Sweden

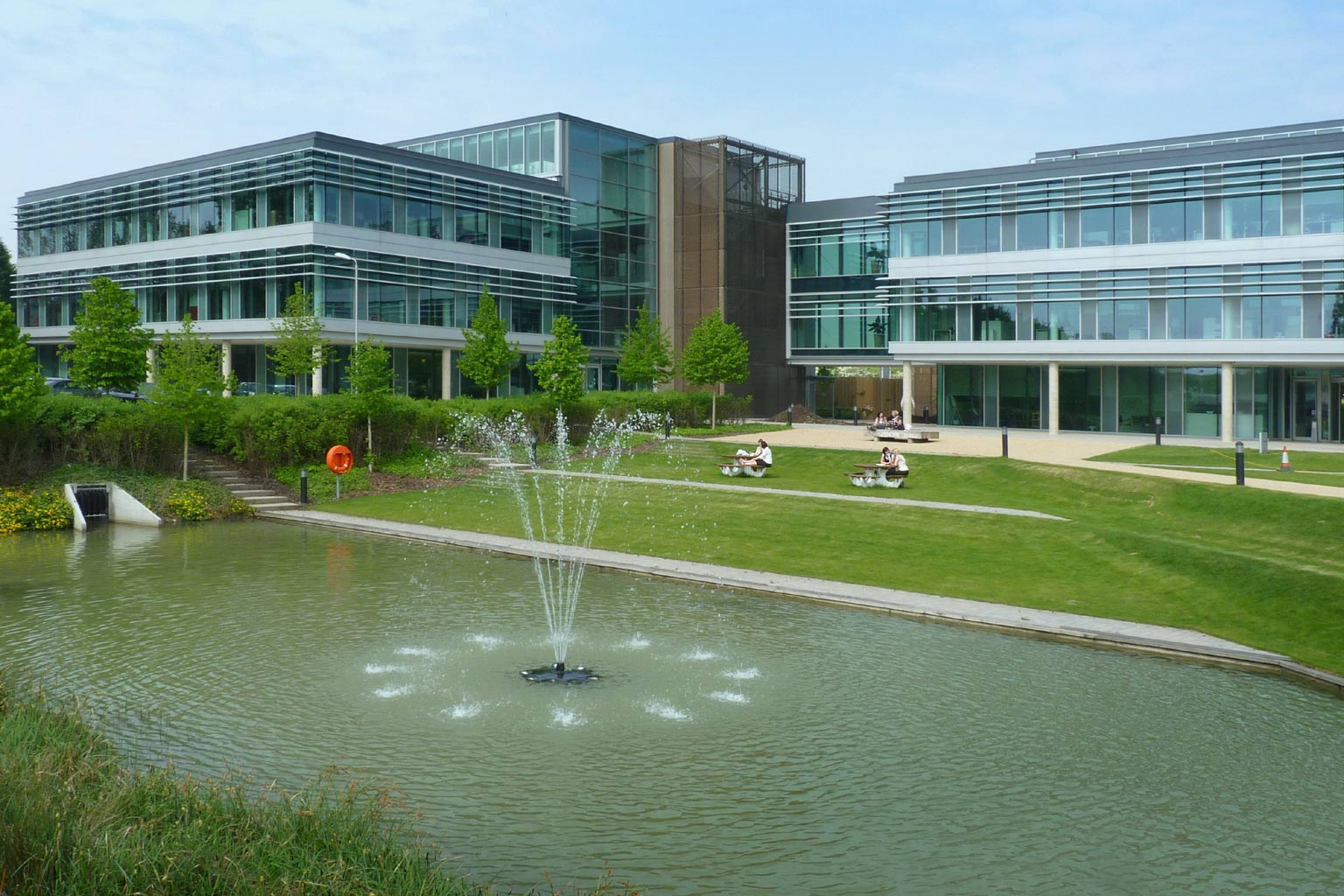
Cambridge Science Park in England

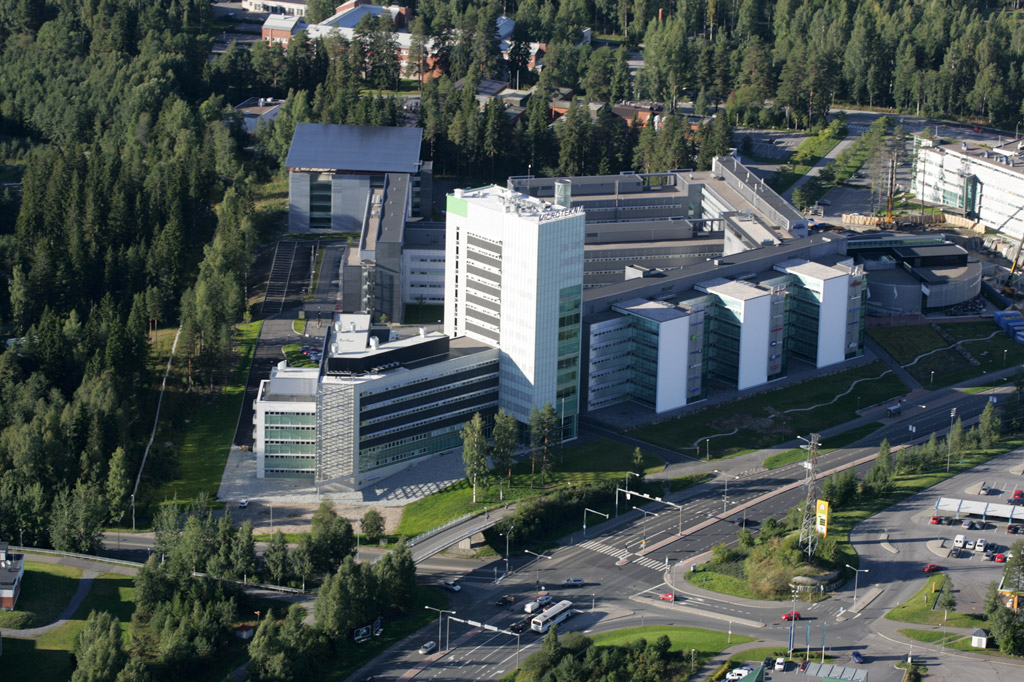
Kuopio Science Park in Finland

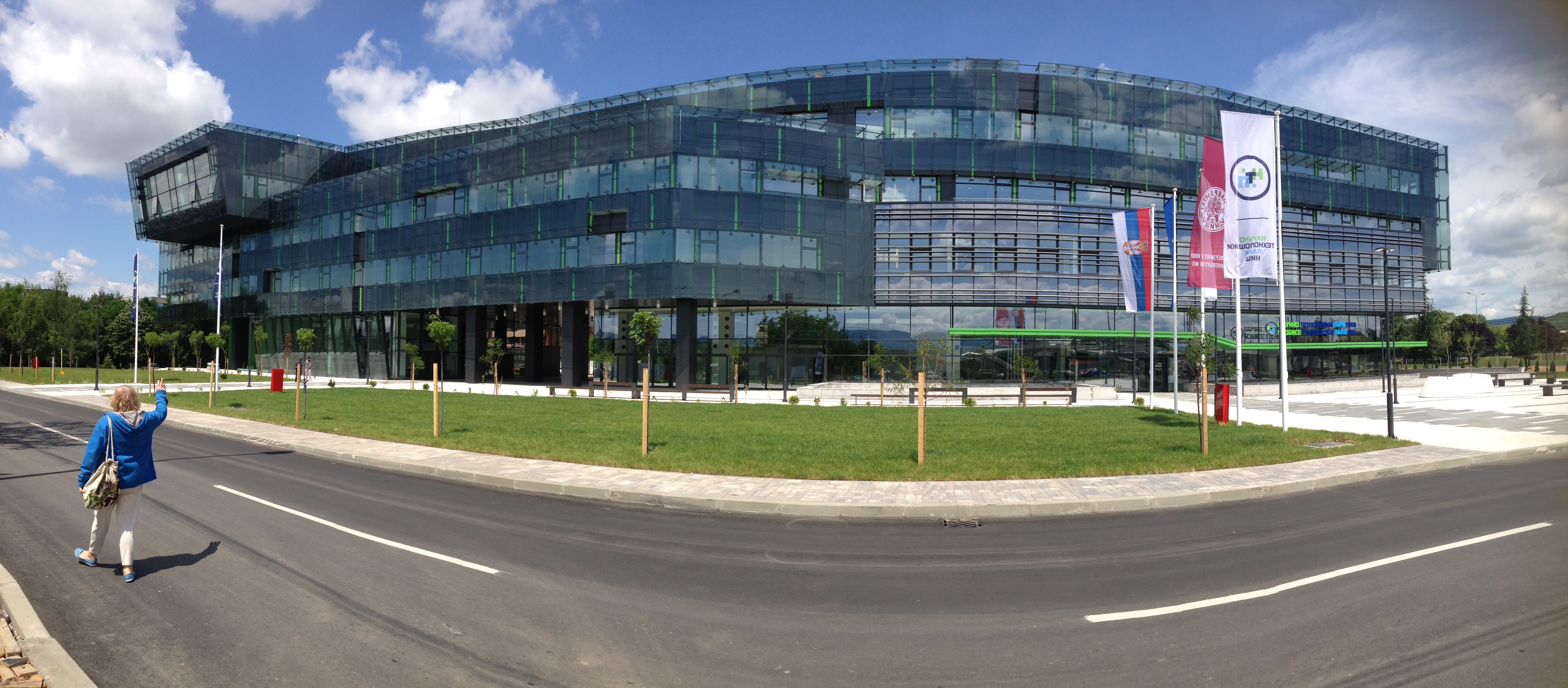
Science and technology park in Niš, Serbia

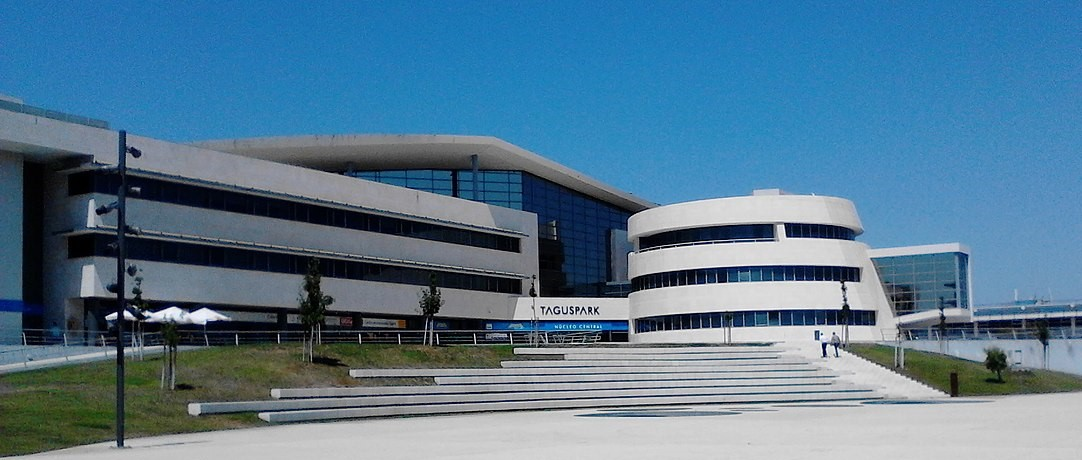
Congress center at Taguspark - Science and Technology Park, Lisbon Region, Portugal

A science park, also referred to as a research park, technology park, technopark, technopolis, technopole, or a science and technology park (STP), is a property-based development that accommodates and fosters the growth of tenant firms. These parks are affiliated with a university, government, or private research body based on proximity, ownership, and/or governance. The primary objective of this affiliation is to facilitate the exchange of knowledge, promote innovation, transfer technology, and progress research outcomes to viable commercial products. Science parks are also often perceived as contributing to national economic development, stimulating the formation of new high-technology firms, attracting foreign investment, and promoting exports.

== Background ==
The world's first university research park, Stanford Research Park was launched in 1951 as a cooperative venture between Stanford University and the City of Palo Alto. Another early university research park was Research Triangle Park in North Carolina, which was launched in 1959. In 1969, Pierre Laffitte founded the Sophia Antipolis Science Park in France. Laffitte had travelled widely and developed a theory of "cross-fertilisation" where individuals could benefit mutually by the exchange of thoughts in many fields including culture, science and the arts.

Science parks are elements of the infrastructure of the global "knowledge economy". They provide concentration that foster innovation and the development and commercialization of technology and where governments, universities and private companies may collaborate. The developers work in fields such as information technology, pharmaceuticals, science and engineering. Science parks may also offer a number of shared resources, such as incubators, programs and collaboration activities, uninterruptible power supply, telecommunications hubs, reception and security, management offices, bank offices, convention center, parking, and internal transportation.

Science parks also aim to bring together people who assist the developers of technology to bring their work to commercial fruition, for example, experts in intellectual property law. They can be attractive to university students who may interact with prospective employers and encourage students to remain in the local area.

Science parks may be designed to enhance the quality of life of the workers. For example, they might be built with sports facilities, restaurants, crèches or pleasant outdoor areas. Apart from tenants, science parks create jobs for the local community.

Science parks are specific locations and differ from the wider area high-technology business districts in that they are more organized, planned, and managed. They differ from science centres in that they lead to commercialized products from research. They differ from industrial parks which focus on manufacturing and from business parks which focus on business office locations.

Science parks are found worldwide. They are most common in developed countries. In North America there are over 170 science parks. For example, in the 1980s, North Carolina State University, Raleigh lacked space. New possible sites included the state mental-health property and the Diocese of Raleigh property on 1,000 acres (4.0 km^{2}) surrounding the Lake Raleigh Reservoir. The university's Centennial Campus was developed. Sandia Science and Technology Park, NASA Research Park at Ames and the East Tennessee Technology Park at Oak Ridge National Laboratory are examples of research parks that have been developed by or adjacent to US federal government laboratories.

Science and technology park (STP) activity across the European Union has approximately doubled over the last 11–12 years, driven by the growth of the longer standing parks and the emergence of new parks. There are now an estimated 366 STPs in the EU member states that manage about 28 million m2 of completed building floor space, hosting circa 40,000 organisations that employ approximately 750,000 people, mostly in high value added jobs. In the period from 2000 – 2012, total capital investment into EU STPs was circa €11.7 billion (central estimate). During the same period, STPs spent circa €3 billion on the professional business support and innovation services they either deliver or finance to assist both their tenants and other similar knowledge based businesses in their locality.

Increasingly, the reasons why STPs are sound investments for public sector support are becoming better understood and articulated. The evidence base shows that better STPs are not simply the landlords of attractive and well specified office style buildings. Rather, they are complex organisations, often with multiple owners having objectives aligned with important elements of economic development public policy as well as an imperative to be financially self-sustaining in the longer term.

== Definitions ==
The Association of University Research Parks (AURP), is a non-profit association consisting of university-affiliated science parks, almost entirely based in North America. It defines "university research and science parks" as "property-based ventures with certain characteristics, including master planned property and buildings designed primarily for private/public research and development facilities, high technology and science based companies and support services; contractual, formal or operational relationships with one or more science or research institutions of higher education; roles in promoting the university's research and development through industry partnerships, assisting in the growth of new ventures and promoting economic development; roles in aiding the transfer of technology and business skills between university and industry teams and roles in promoting technology-led economic development for the community or region."

The International Association of Science Parks and Areas of Innovation (IASP), the worldwide network of science parks and areas of innovation, defines a science park as "an organisation managed by specialised professionals, whose main aim is to increase the wealth of its community by promoting the culture of innovation and the competitiveness of its associated businesses and knowledge-based institutions. To enable these goals to be met, a Science Park stimulates and manages the flow of knowledge and technology amongst universities, R&D institutions, companies and markets; it facilitates the creation and growth of innovation-based companies through incubation and spin-off processes; and provides other value-added services together with high quality space and facilities.".

The Cabral-Dahab Science Park Management Paradigm, was first presented by Regis Cabral in ten points in 1990. According to this management paradigm, a science park must: "have access to qualified research and development personnel in the areas of knowledge in which the park has its identity; be able to market its high valued products and services; have the capability to provide marketing expertise and managerial skills to firms, particularly small and medium-sized enterprises, lacking such a resource; be inserted in a society that allows for the protection of product or process secrets, via patents, security or any other means; be able to select or reject which firms enter the park". A science park should: "have a clear identity, quite often expressed symbolically, as the park's name choice, its logo or the management discourse; have a management with established or recognized expertise in financial matters, and which has presented long-term economic development plans; have the backing of powerful, dynamic and stable economic actors, such as a funding agency, political institution or local university; include in its management an active person of vision, with the power of decision and with the high and visible profile, who is perceived by relevant actors in society as embodying the interface between academia and industry, long-term plans and good management; and include a prominent percentage of consultancy firms, as well as technical service firms, including laboratories and quality control firms".

The World Intellectual Property Organization defines Science technology parks as territories usually affiliated with a university or a research institution, which accommodate and foster the growth of companies based therein through technology transfer and open innovation.

== List of science parks ==
Some science parks include:

- Dalan Technopark, Yerevan, Armenia
- Bioindustry Park Silvano Fumero, Colleretto Giacosa, Piedmont, Italy
- NOVI Science Park, Aalborg, Denmark
- National Science and Technology Park (NSTP), Islamabad, Pakistan
- Abuja Technology Village, Abuja, Nigeria
- Accra Digital Centre, Accra, Ghana
- Birmingham Science Park Aston, Birmingham, England, United Kingdom
- University of Warwick Science Park, Coventry, England, United Kingdom
- Keele University Science & Business Park, Keele, England, United Kingdom
- York Science Park, York, England, United Kingdom
- Catalyst, Northern Ireland, United Kingdom
- Plymouth Science Park, Plymouth, England, United Kingdom
- Isfahan Science and Technology Town (ISTT), Isfahan, Iran
- Haasrode Research Park, Leuven, Belgium
- Purdue Research Park, West Lafayette, Indiana, United States
- Sonoran Oasis Research and Technology Park - developed around TSMC in Phoenix
- Wissenschaftspark Leipzig, Leipzig, Germany
- Innovation Campus Lemgo, Lemgo, Germany
- Johanneberg Science Park, Gothenburg, Sweden
- Lindholmen Science Park, Gothenburg, Sweden
- Sahlgrenska Science Park, Gothenburg, Sweden
- Linköping Science Park, Linköping, Sweden
- Turku Science Park, Turku, Finland
- Hong Kong Science Park, Pak Shek Kok, Hong Kong
- Hsinchu Science Park, Hsinchu, Taiwan
- Research Triangle Park, North Carolina
- NanKang Software Park
- Advanced Manufacturing Park in Sheffield
- Cambridge Science Park
- NETPark, County Durham, England
- Skolkovo Innovation Center, Moscow, Russia
- Nazarbayev University Research and Innovation System
- ABC Science Park in Astana, Kazakhstan
- Innopolis, Kazan, Russia
- Daedeok Innopolis, South Korea
- Technology Centre Teknia, Kuopio, Finland
- Technopark, Stellenbosch, South Africa
- Bandung Techno Park, Bandung, West Java, Indonesia
- Cimahi Techno Park, Cimahi, West Java, Indonesia
- Solo Techno Park, Surakarta, Central Java, Indonesia
- Sophia-Antipolis, Côte d'Azur, France
- Technopark Zürich, Zürich, Switzerland
- Bagmane Tech Park, BangaloreKarnataka, India
- Technopark, Trivandrum, Trivandrum
- Genome Valley, Hyderabad, Telangana, India
- Arfa Software Technology Park, Pakistan
- Cummings Research Park, Huntsville, Alabama
- University of Wisconsin Research Park, Madison, Wisconsin
- Gateway University Research Park, Greensboro, North Carolina
- Amsterdam Science Park, Amsterdam, Netherlands
- Utrecht Science Park, Utrecht, Netherlands
- WISTA Science and Technology Park, Berlin, Germany
- Biopolis, Singapore
- Singapore Science Park, Singapore
- ESADE Creapolis https://www.esadecreapolis.com/, Barcelona, Spain
- Sofia Tech Park
- Regional Science Centre and Science Park, Jaipur, Rajasthan

== See also ==
- Business cluster
- Business incubator
- Cluster development
- Megasite
