= Fumero =

Fumero is a surname. Notable people with the surname include:

- David Fumero (born 1972), American actor and fashion model
- Jorge Fumero (born 1968), Cuban baseball player
- Margherita Fumero (born 1947), Italian actress and comedian
- Melissa Fumero (born 1982), American actress

== See also ==
- Bioindustry Park Silvano Fumero, science park in Italy
