= Corporate park =

Corporate park may refer to:

- Business park
- Industrial park
- Science park
