= York Science Park =

Business park in York, England

Coordinates: 53.9489°N 1.0457°W

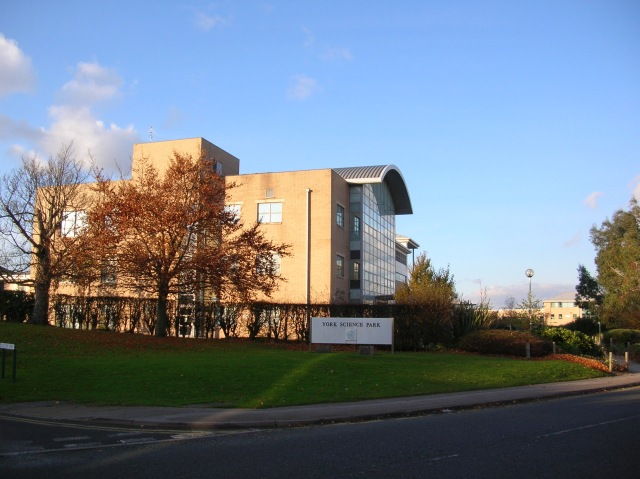
- Entrance to York Science Park, facing towards the Innovation Centre
- Interactive map of York Science Park
- Location: Heslington, York, Yorkshire, England
- Opening date: 1991
- Owner: University of York
- No. of tenants: 400 companies
- Size: 21 acres (8.5 ha)
- Website: https://www.yorksciencepark.co.uk/

The York Science Park opened in 1991 and currently houses over 400 companies. The main 21 acre site is adjacent to Alcuin College and contains the innovation centre and Biocentre with business focused on the tech and science industries.

== Guildhall ==
The Science park also operates the York Guildhall in the city centre. The Grade I listed building was leased to York science park for 15 years in 2021 after a £21.7 million restoration. The Guildhall is used for conference events but also contains a public café and a restaurant.

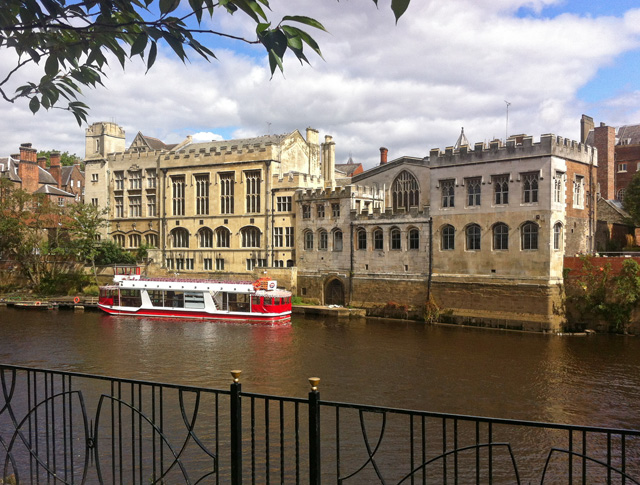
View of the Guildhall from the River Ouse

== The Catalyst ==
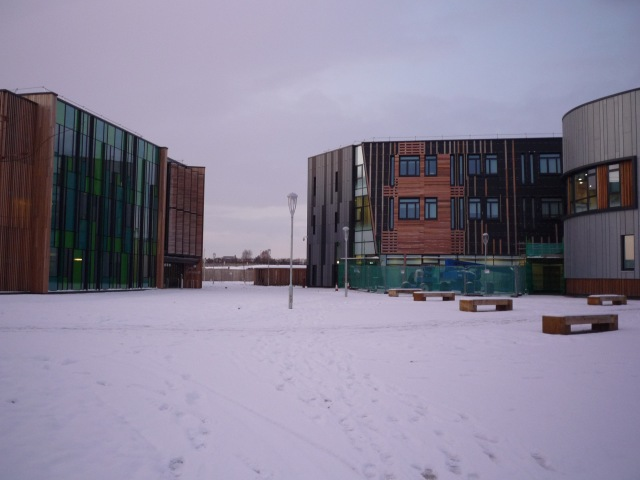
The Catalyst Building (left) and the Law and Management Building (right)

Also run by York Science park is the Catalyst on the University of York's Campus East. The 3,000 sqm building was completed 2011 by the building firm BDP and costing over £4.7 million. The centre supports early businesses in the IT, digital, and media sectors with connections to the University of York's related departments. The centre also has a partnership with Eagle labs funded by Barclays.

== Future developments ==
As part the City of York local plan there are plans to redevelop the University of York this includes a redevelopment of the science park. Current plans include an allocation of 16.5 acres on Campus East to be developed for use as a science park. Under this plan it would include an increase of 30,000 sqm of floorspace for the science park, there would also be a redevelopment of the existing park on campus west.
