= Kupittaa =

District in Turku, Finland

Coordinates: 60°26′42″N 022°17′36″E

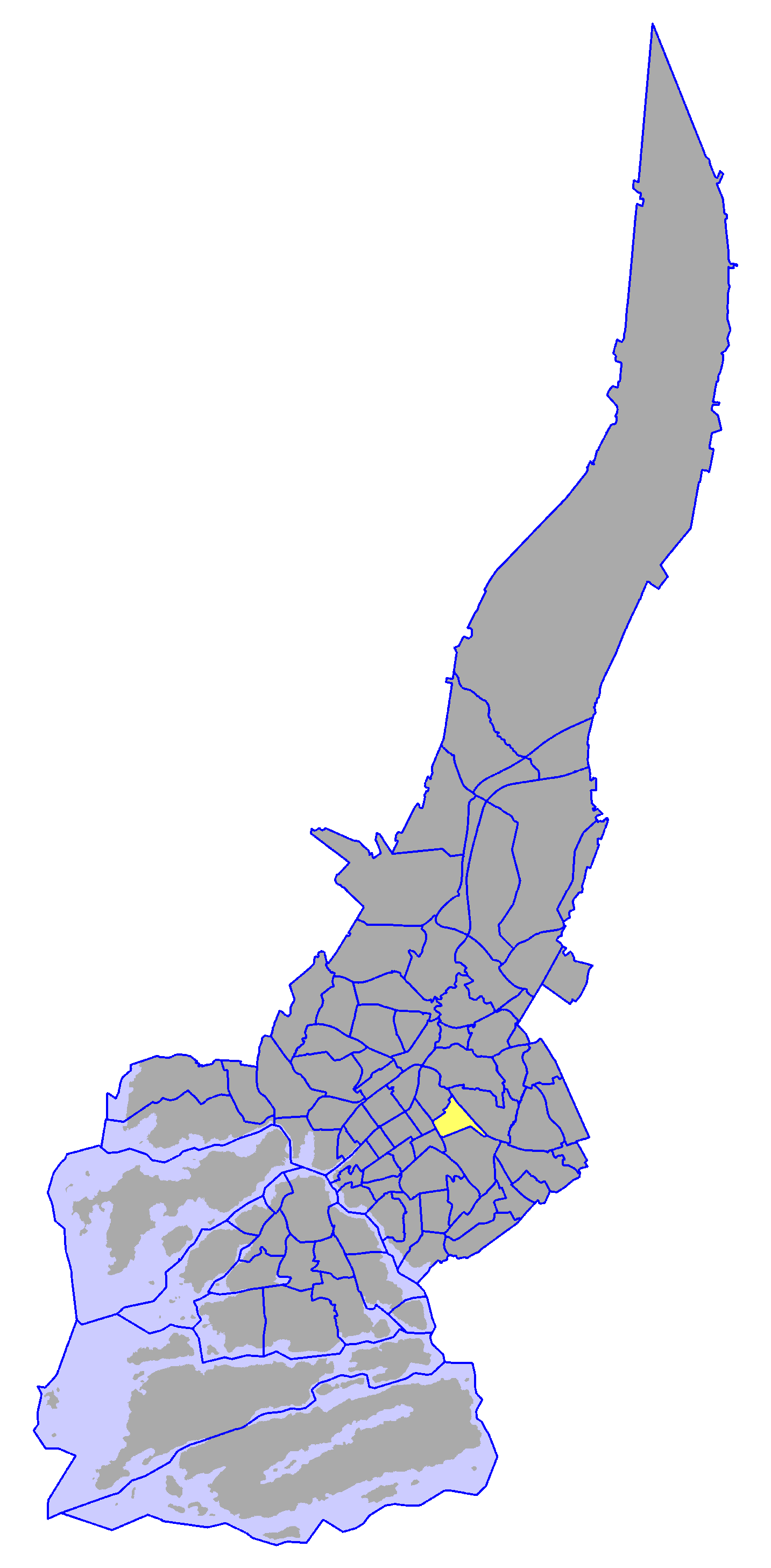
Kupittaa on a map of Turku.

Kupittaa (Swedish: Kuppis) is a district in Turku, Finland. It is located on the eastern side of the city's centre, around the Kupittaa Park, the first landscaped park in a Finnish city. The district serves as a centre for recreation and business. Turku has recently planned a residential area for 750 residents on the premises of a former HKScan sausage factory.

== Name ==
The name Kupittaa may be associated with an old border and may be related to the word kupitsa, a name for a boundary mark. Another theory is that it comes from the Slavic word for a merchant, kupets.

== History ==
According to a version of the legend, the first pagan Finns were baptised into Christianity by the Bishop Henry at a spring in Kupittaa Park on Midsummer Day in the year 1155. In the 18th century, the spring was used as a spa facility.

== Buildings ==
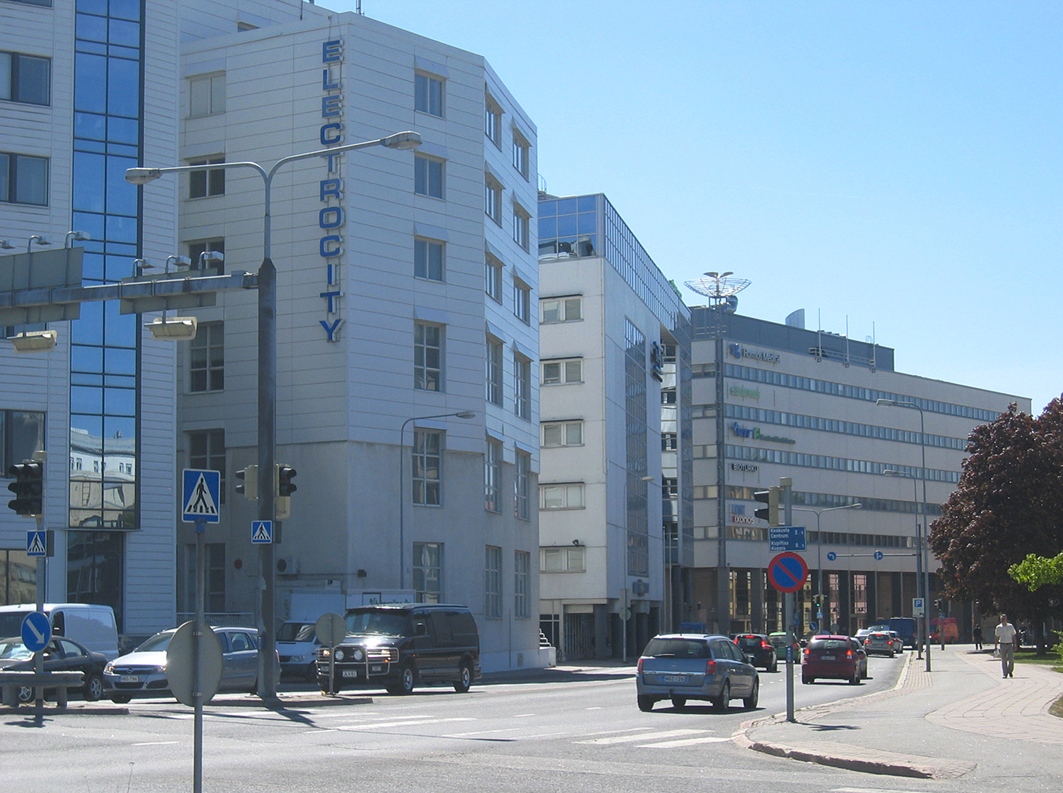
Electrocity, Biocity and Pharmacity on the Tykistökatu street belong to Turku Science Park

Most of the Turku Science Park business centre is located in Kupittaa. The centre is currently expanding around Kupittaa railway station, next to Finnish national road 1 (part of European route E18) between Helsinki and Turku.

== Sport ==
The area hosts, among other things, numerous sports facilities, such as the Veritas Stadion, a Pesäpallo (Finnish baseball) stadium, a velodrome, a bowling alley, a skateboarding area and a BMX track, and the Kupittaa open-air swimming pools. The ice hockey arena in the district was demolished in 2005. A new one was inaugurated in November 2006.

=== Veritas Stadion ===
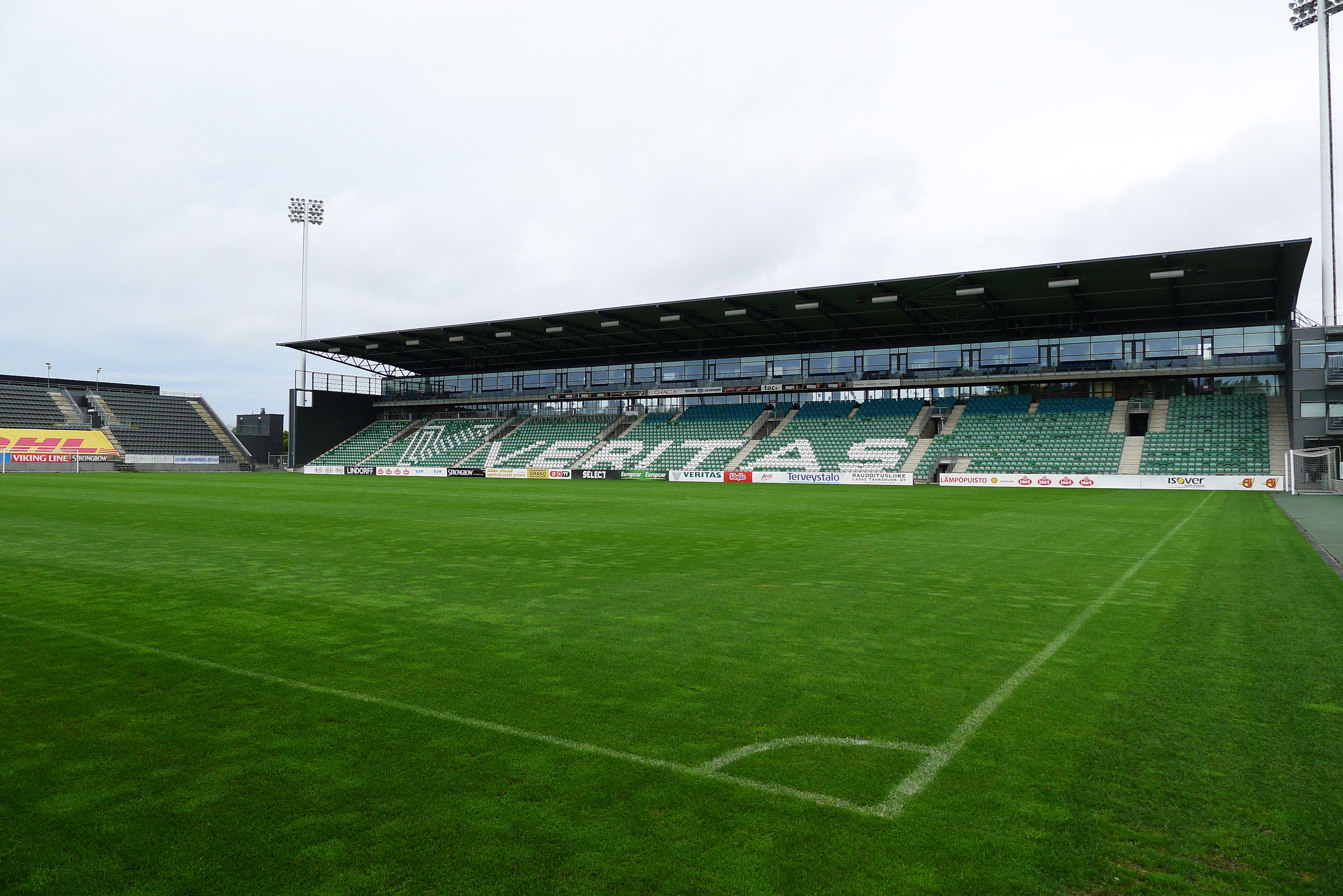
The interior of the Veritas Stadium

The Veritas Stadion is used by the association football team FC Inter Turku, who comepete in the Veikkausliiga.

=== Turku Hippodrome ===
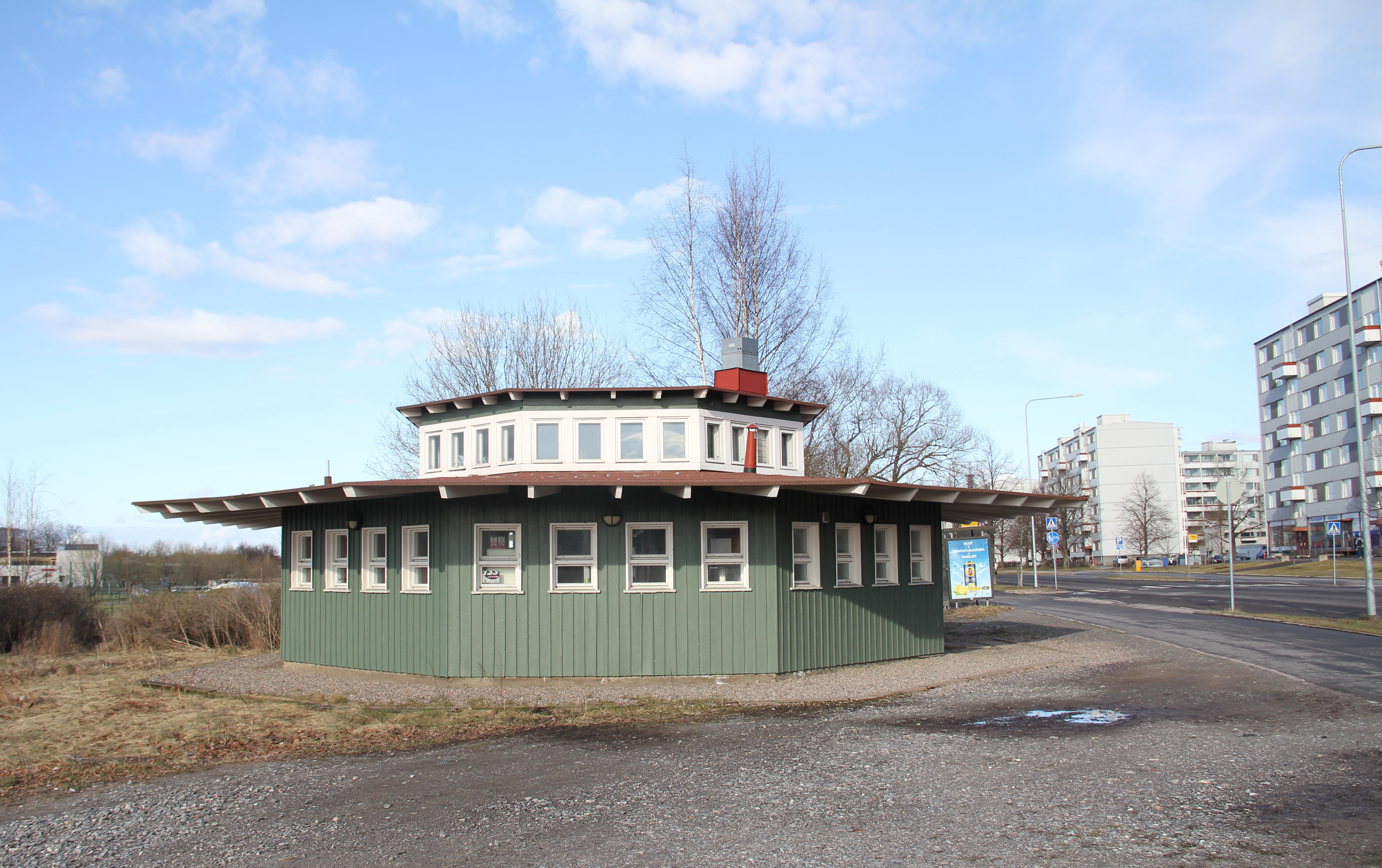
the only remaining building of the Hippodrome, the kiosk completed in 1948

The Turku Hippodrome or Kupittaa Racecourse was a racetrack located north of Hippoxentie (next to the Veritas Stadion) between 1902 and 1973. Turku Hippos, founded in 1894, began planning the construction of its own track immediately after its establishment. A suitable place was found when the Turku Sniper Battalion moved its shooting range from Kupittaa to Kärsämäki in 1899. Ravirata started operating three years later.

In the 1970s, Kupitta started to become too cramped for the operation of the race track. In addition, the old-fashioned track no longer met the requirements of the time. The last races at the Kupittaa racetrack were held on 9 September 1973. Today, only the kiosk building completed in 1948, remains of the Kupittaa racetrack. The wooden kiosk designed by architect Erik Bryggman is protected.

There was also a motorcycle speedway track on the infield of the race track, where the first competition of the sport was held in Finland in 1949. It hosted significant events including a qualifying rounds of the Speedway World Championship in 1955 and 1959 and the Finnish Speedway Championship in 1956, 1958, 1961, 1973 and 1976.

In addition, there was also a greyhound track in the area, where the 1981 Nordic championships were organised. The Greyhound track ceased operations in the early 1980s.

== Gallery ==
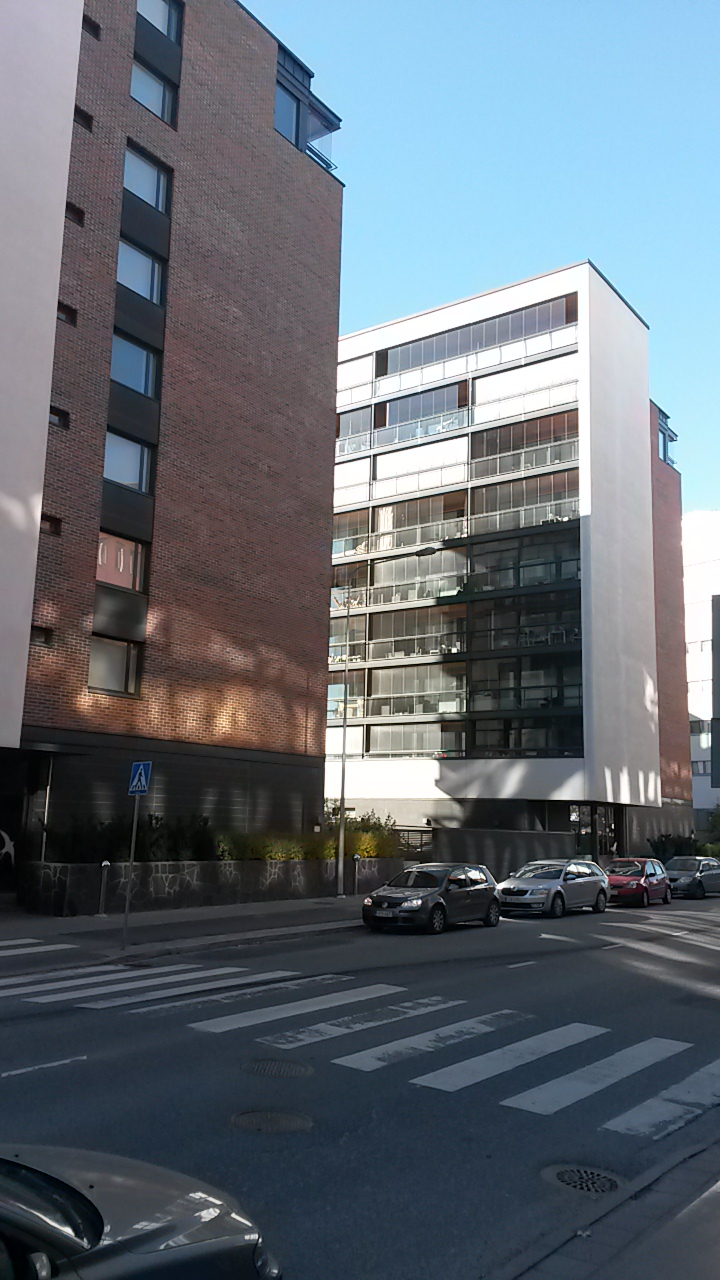
Residential buildings on the Lemminkäisenkatu street

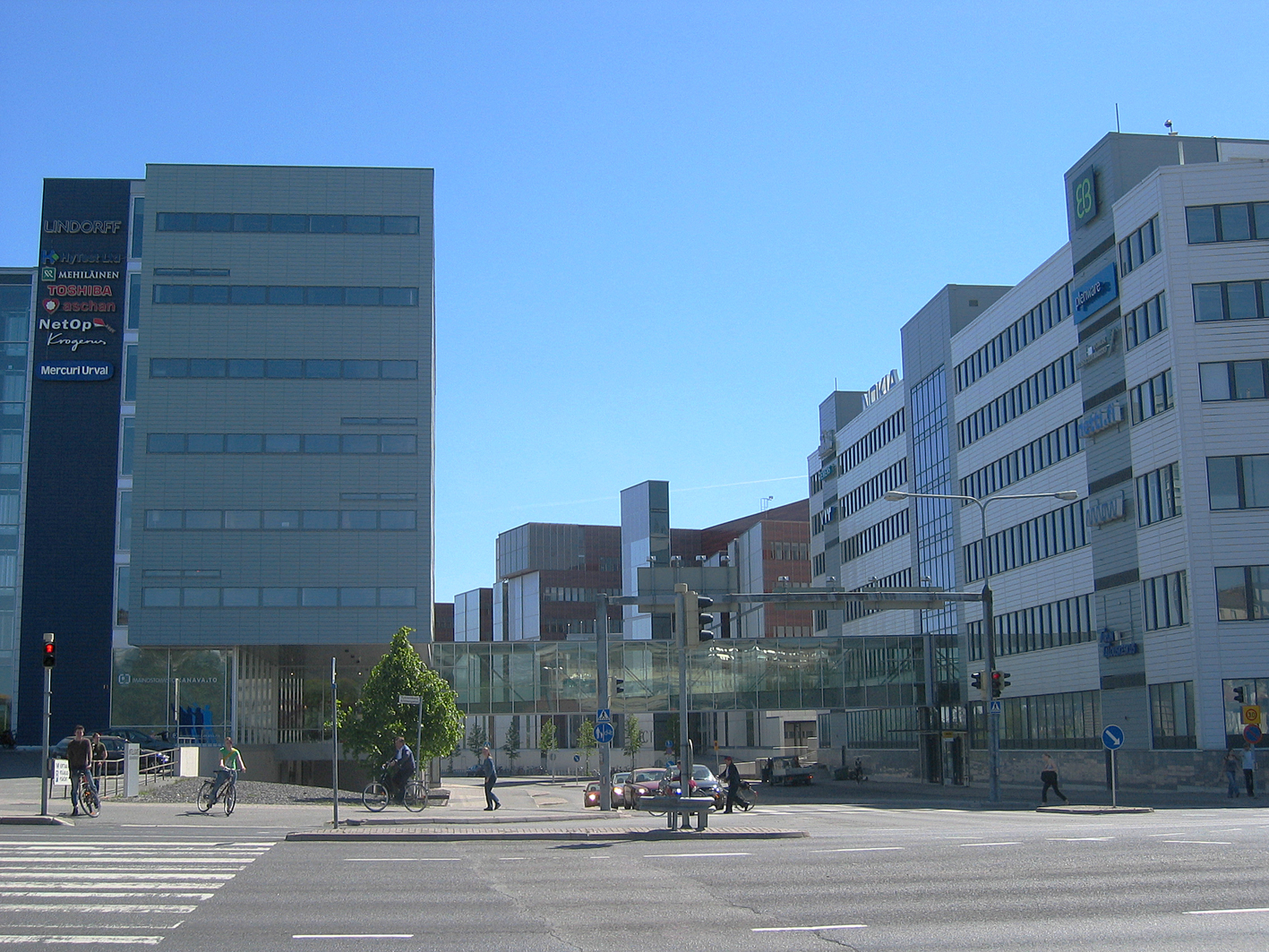
Buildings on the Joukahaisenkatu

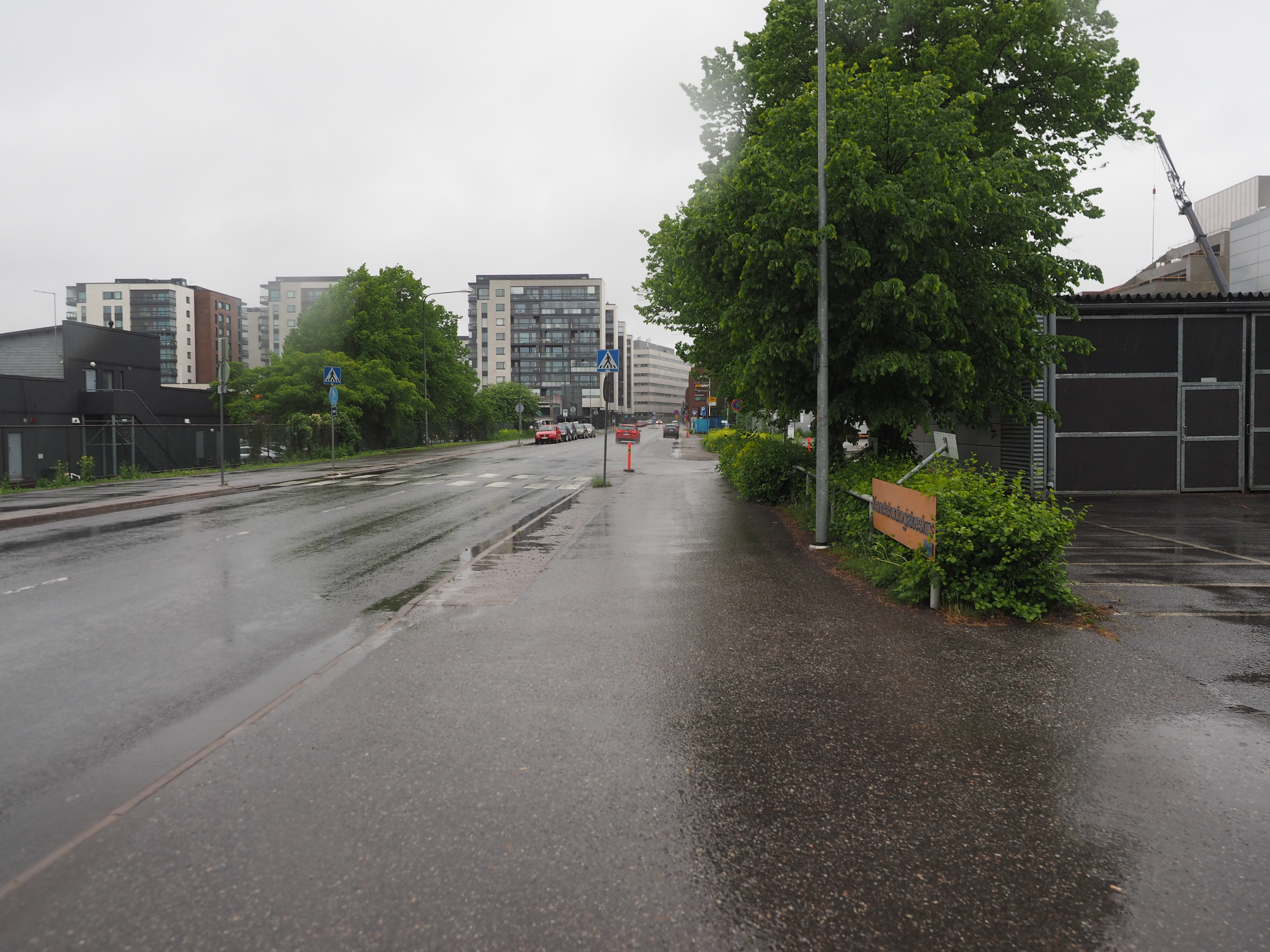
Lemminkäisenkatu street in rainy weather, near the Kupittaa sport hall

== See also ==
- Turku Science Park
