= Johanneberg Science Park =

Science park in Gothenburg, Sweden

Coordinates: 57°41′5.09″N 11°58′40.68″E

Johanneberg Science Park was established in December 2009 by the Chalmers University of Technology Foundation and the City of Gothenburg to create better conditions for regional sustainable growth, based on the activities currently conducted within Chalmers University of Technology at Campus Johanneberg in Gothenburg, Sweden.

The Science Park primarily support development of activities within the disciplines of Urban Development, Environment, Energy, Materials and Nanoscience.
