= Turku Science Park =

Community of businesses and educational establishments in Turku, Finland

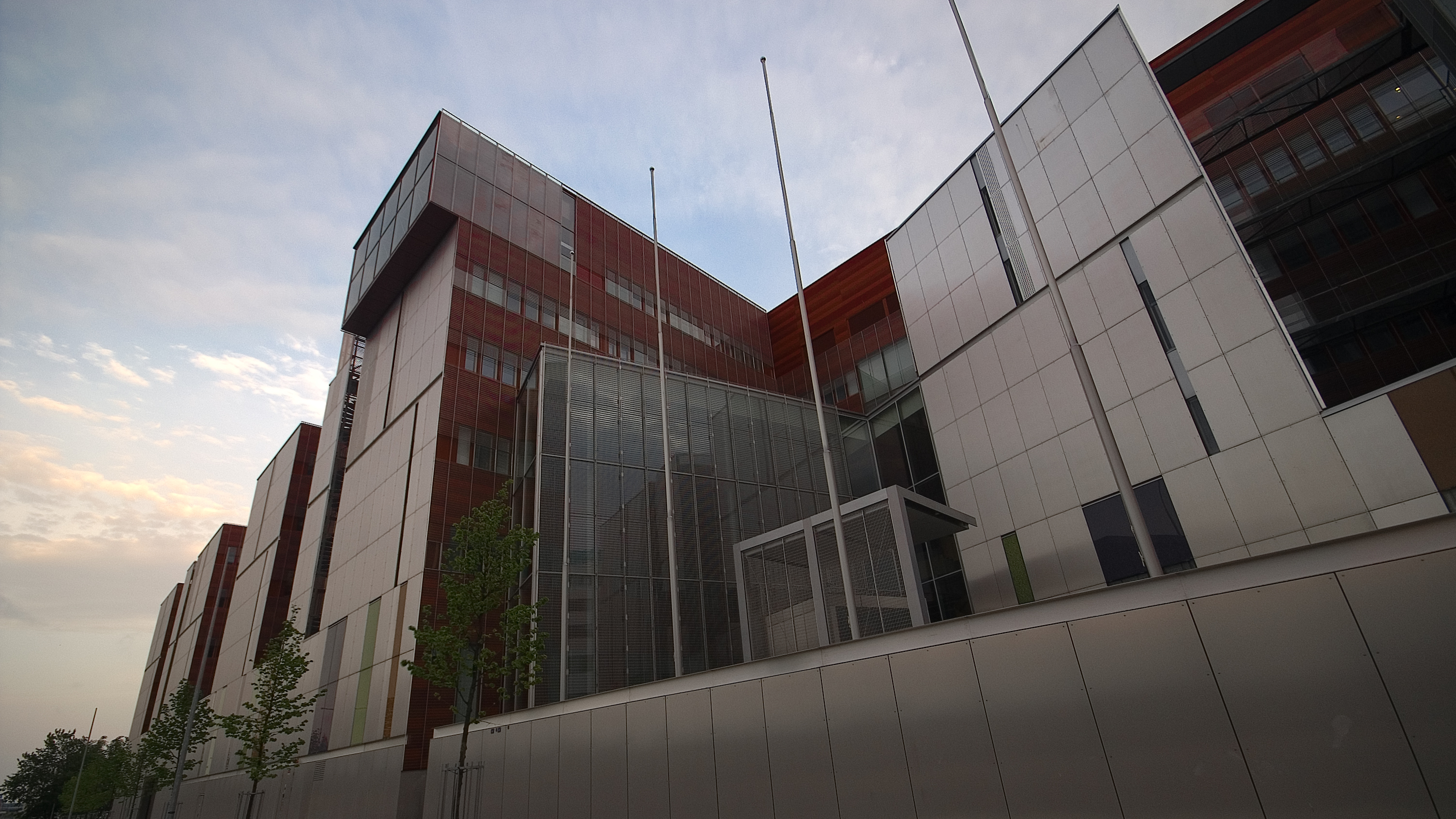
The ICT-building is one of the newest buildings of Science Park. It is used by University of Turku, Åbo Akademi University and Turku Polytechnic.

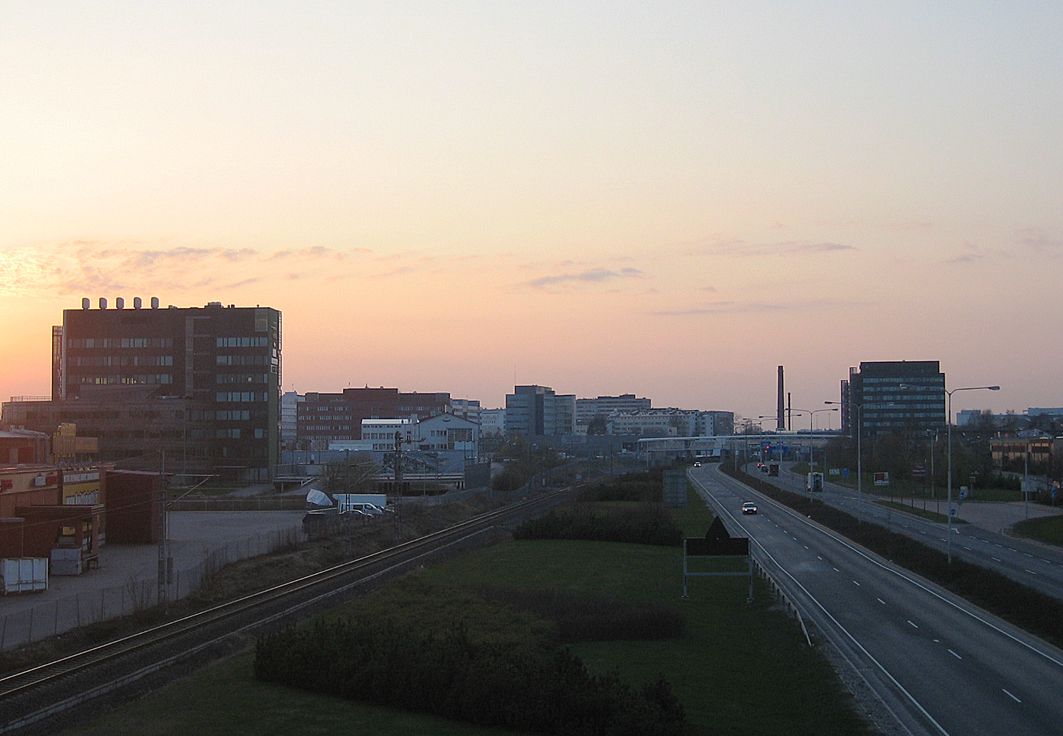
Turku Science Park located on both sides of the Turku-Helsinki highway. Business area growing and expanding continuously.

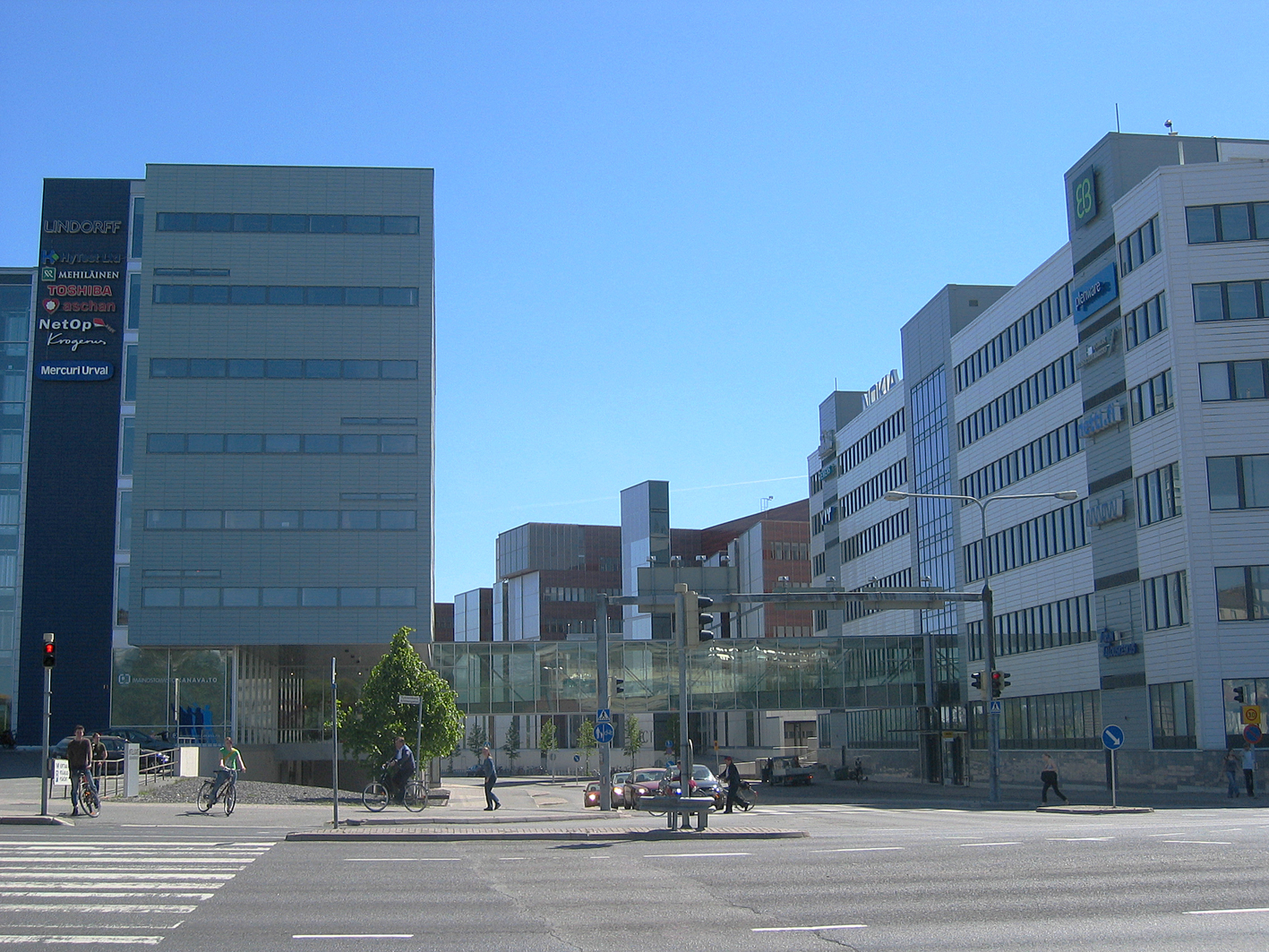
Some office buildings. From left to right: Intelligate 1, ICT-building and Euro City.

Turku Science Park is a community of businesses and educational establishments in the city of Turku, Finland. It focuses on development of the biotechnology and IT industries in southwestern Finland through cooperation of the different factors in the field. Its membership includes approximately 300 companies operating in Turku, including e.g. Nokia and Fujitsu. It also works in close partnership with Åbo Akademi University, University of Turku and Turku University of Applied Sciences.

The Science Park is located to the east of the city centre, mainly in the district of Kupittaa. The universities and the TYKS central hospital, another important partner of the project, are situated in the I District of the city. Premises of the Science Park amount to a total of 210,000 m² in eleven buildings, and heavy construction work is currently taking place in Kupittaa to cater for the projects present in the area. The project is organised as a limited liability company, Turku Science Park Ltd., with the City of Turku as its largest shareholder.

== Buildings ==
- Biocity
- Eurocity
- Electrocity
- Datacity
- Datacorner
- ICT-City
- Intelligate 1
- Intelligate 2
- Hospital Neo
- Kupittaa railway station
- Pharmacity
- Trivium

== Gallery ==
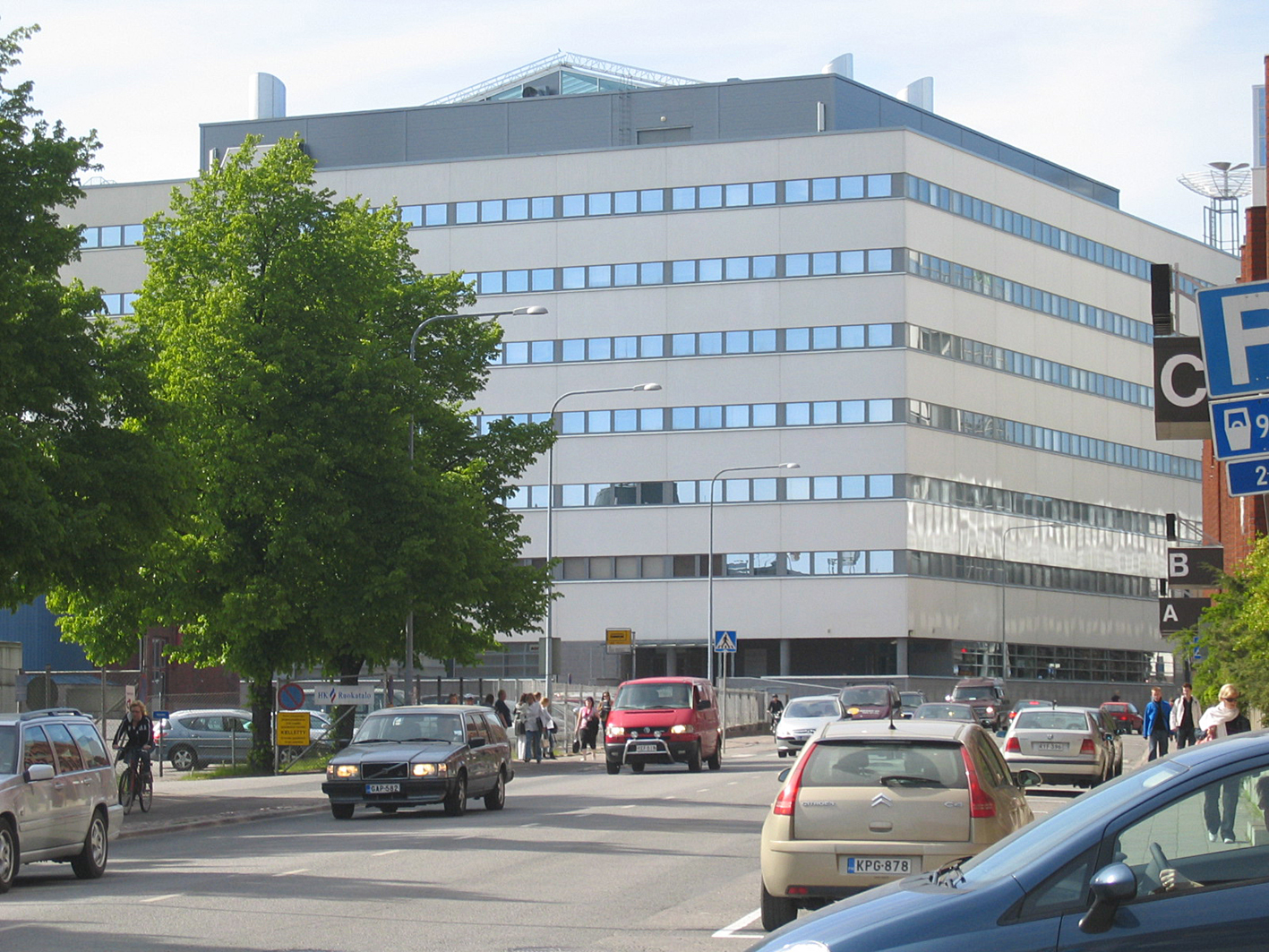
Pharma City
