= Keele University Science & Business Park =

Keele University Science and Innovation Park
- Established: 1986
- Field of research: Medicine; Pharmaceutical; Green Energy; Ceramics
- Location: Keele, Newcastle-under-Lyme, Staffordshire, ST55NH, United Kingdom; 53.003°N 2.273°W
- Website: http://www.kusip.co.uk/

Keele University Science and Innovation Park is a science and business development facility established in 1986 and located on the campus of Keele University in North Staffordshire. It is wholly owned by Keele University. The Science Park focuses to support the growth of innovative businesses, particularly those active in research and development within the West Midlands region by providing a location and a wide range of business support services.

== History ==
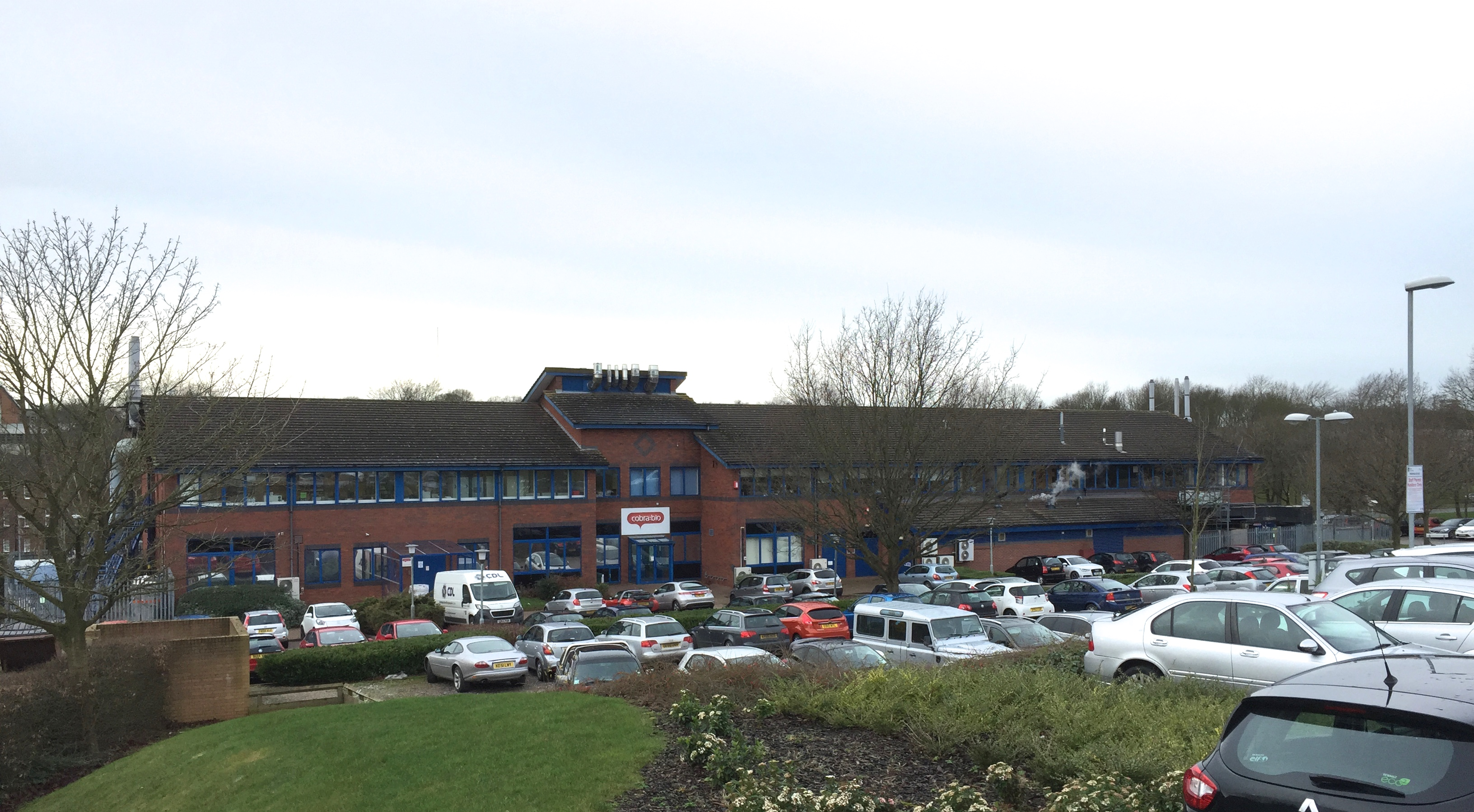
Keele University Stephenson Building

The success of the Merseyside Innovation Centre, which was established in 1980 to promote technology transfer between local academia and industry in Liverpool, spawned a second wave of science parks in the UK. Riding on its crest, in late 1985, the Newcastle-under-Lyme Borough Council declared an interest in creating a science park at Keele University. Opened in December 1986, the Stephenson building, located close to the main university campus was the first development unit and currently houses Cobra Biologics, a pharmaceutical company. The Darwin building followed suit in 1991. In 1999, Keele Park Developments was set-up as a joint venture with Pochin Development to create one of four Innovation Centres. Pochin sold its interest back to Keele in 2013. Keele University Science & Innovation Park is home to over 40 companies/

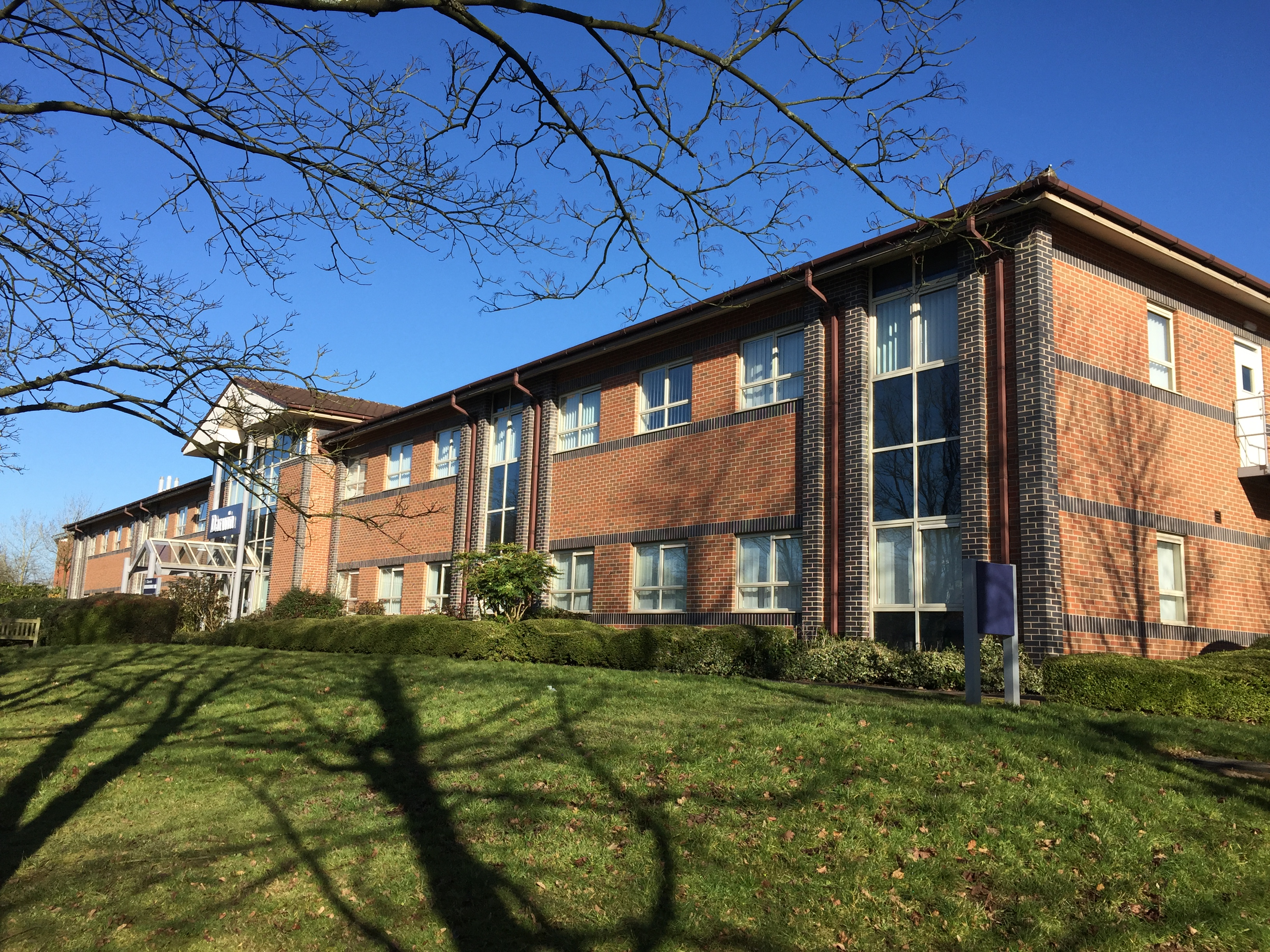
Keele University Darwin Building

All employees of the Science Park can benefit from local campus amenities (bank, pharmacy, cafés) including the Sports Centre. There is also a Day Nursery available for 128 children aged 3 months to 5 years on campus. St John's CE Primary School provides further facilities in Keele village.

== Phase 1 development ==
=== Innovation Centre 1 ===
The first building simply called 'Innovation Centre' and labelled on the side as just IC was opened in 1999 by Her Majesty The Queen.

== Phase 3 development ==
Phase 3 development seeks to focus on well-designed, environmentally advanced facilities for innovative, technology-led occupiers, inward investment and university uses. These would typically include new energy ventures desiring to tap into Keele University's cutting-edge expertise in green technology.

=== Innovation Centre 6 ===
In April 2016, Keele University and Staffordshire County Council initiated discussion for the realization of a sixth business unit with new legislative changes allowing local authorities to retain business rates revenue. As part of the 'Keele New Deal', in January 2017, Keele announced it would provide £5.51 million of funding and will own the building, while the county council will take a long lease on IC6 with a peppercorn rent.

=== Caudwell International Children's Centre ===
Opened in 2018, the Caudwell International Children's Centre is the UK's first purpose-built centre for multi-disciplinary therapy programmes for childhood disability and research of neurodevelopmental conditions, including autism.

== Further Plans for development ==
=== Innovation Centre 7 ===
IC7, scheduled for opening in 2022, will focus on data analytics, artificial intelligence and machine learning. The new building will be adjacent to the new flagship international hotel.

== Academic Buildings and Leisure ==
=== Keele Harper Adams University Veterinary School ===
A new veterinary training school including a referral hospital are scheduled to open in September 2020 with operating theatres, an advanced diagnostic suite and equipment such as MRI and CT scanners. The school will be built opposite the "Smart Innovation Hub".

=== Flagship international hotel ===
Planning permission has been granted for a 150-bed, 4* flagship international hotel with conferencing facilities.

== Gallery ==
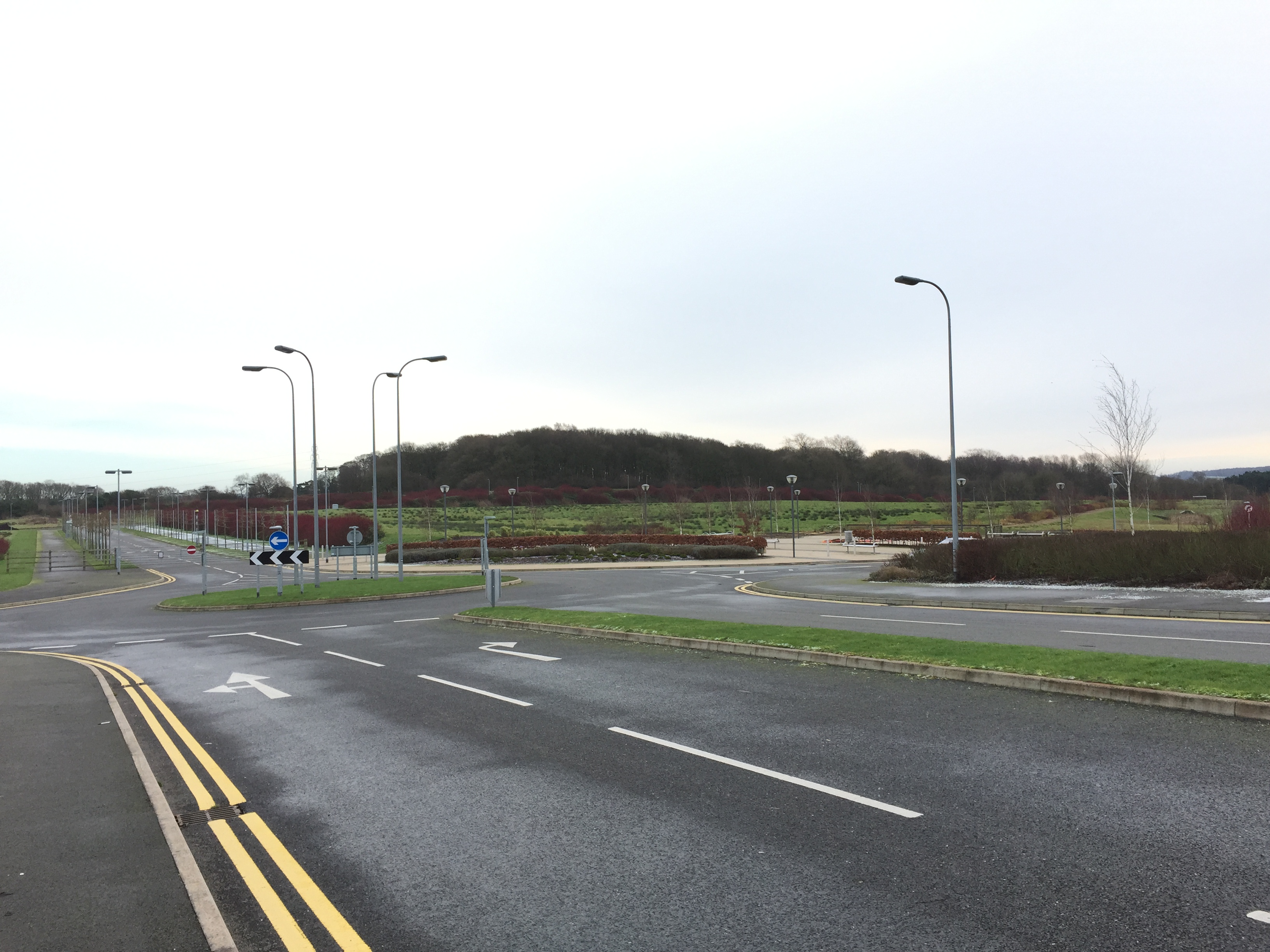
Gallowstree Roundabout

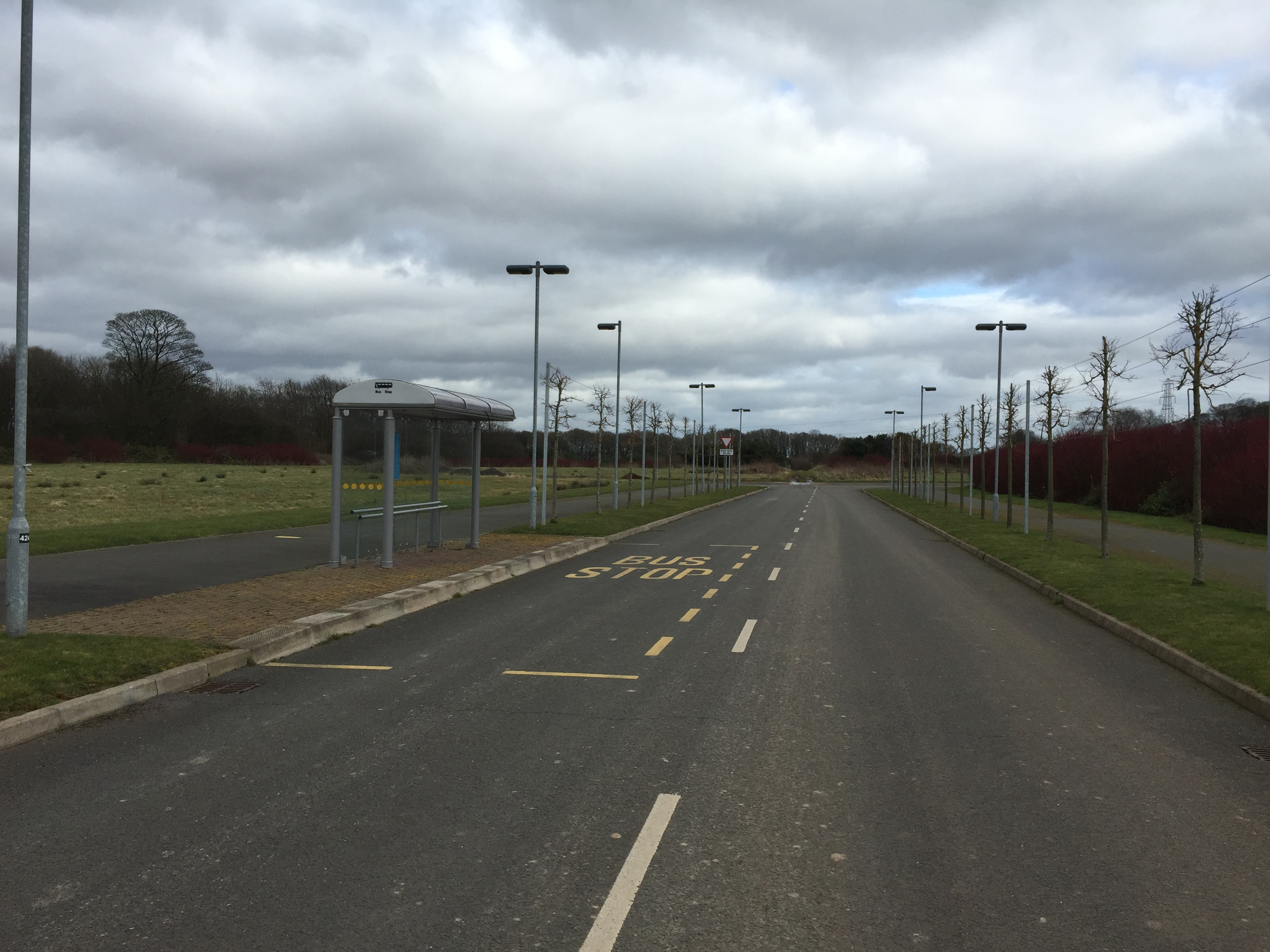
Road and Furniture Infrastructure

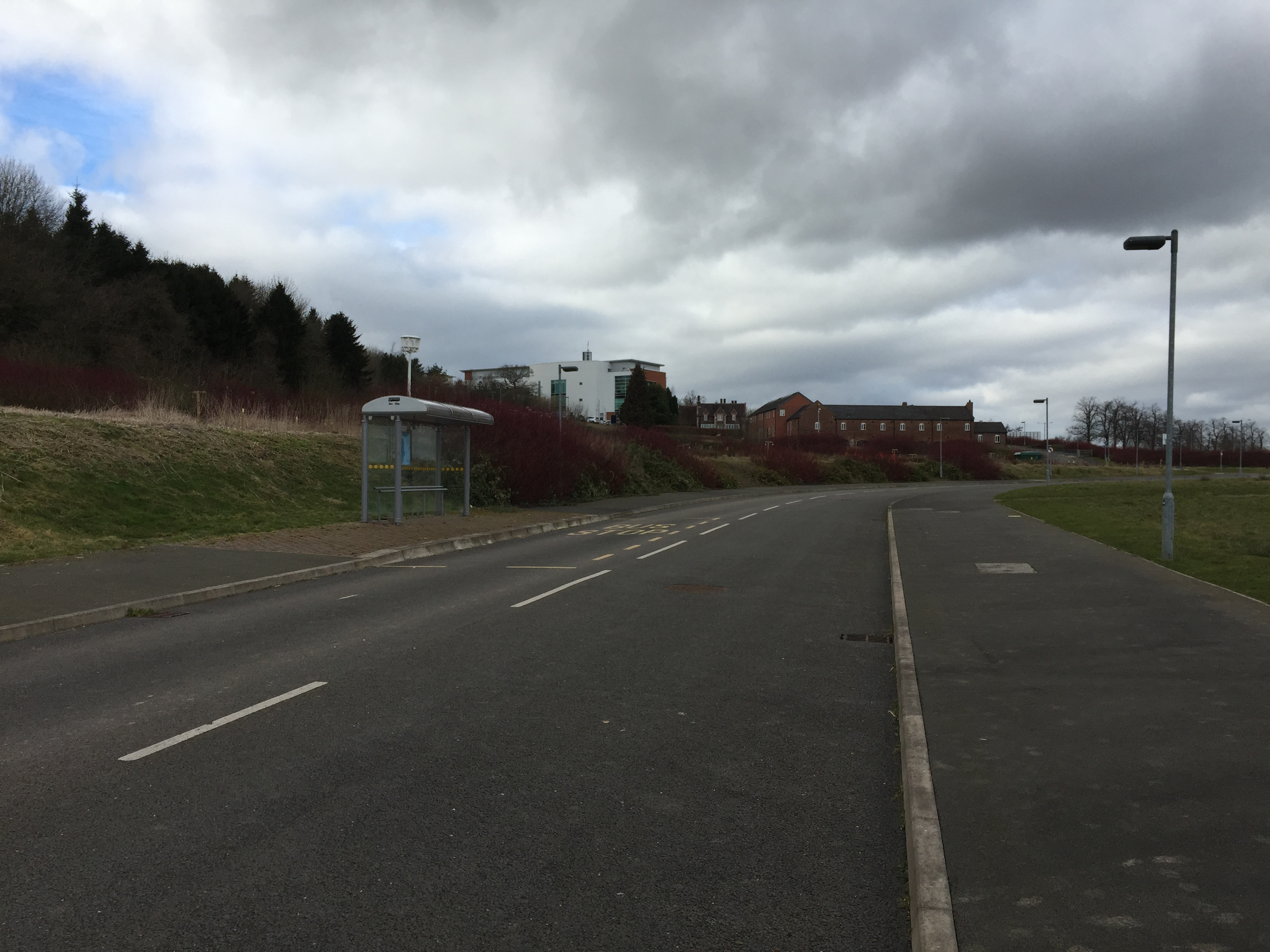
Road, Walkway & Bus Stop

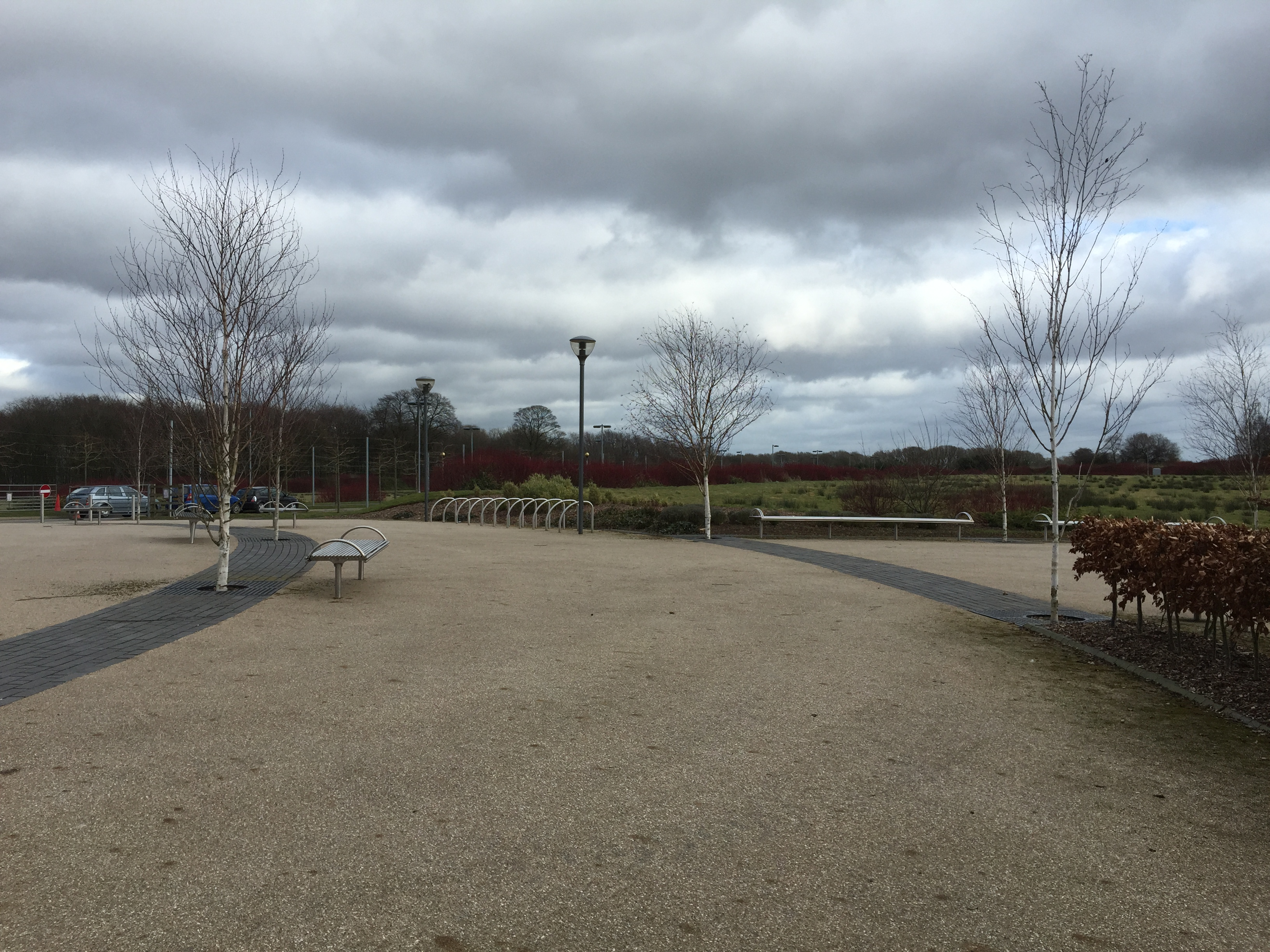
Benches and Cycle Racks

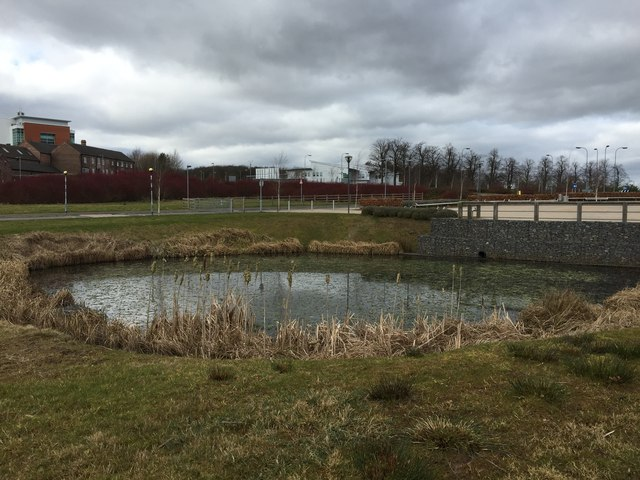
Chain of Small Landscaped Ponds

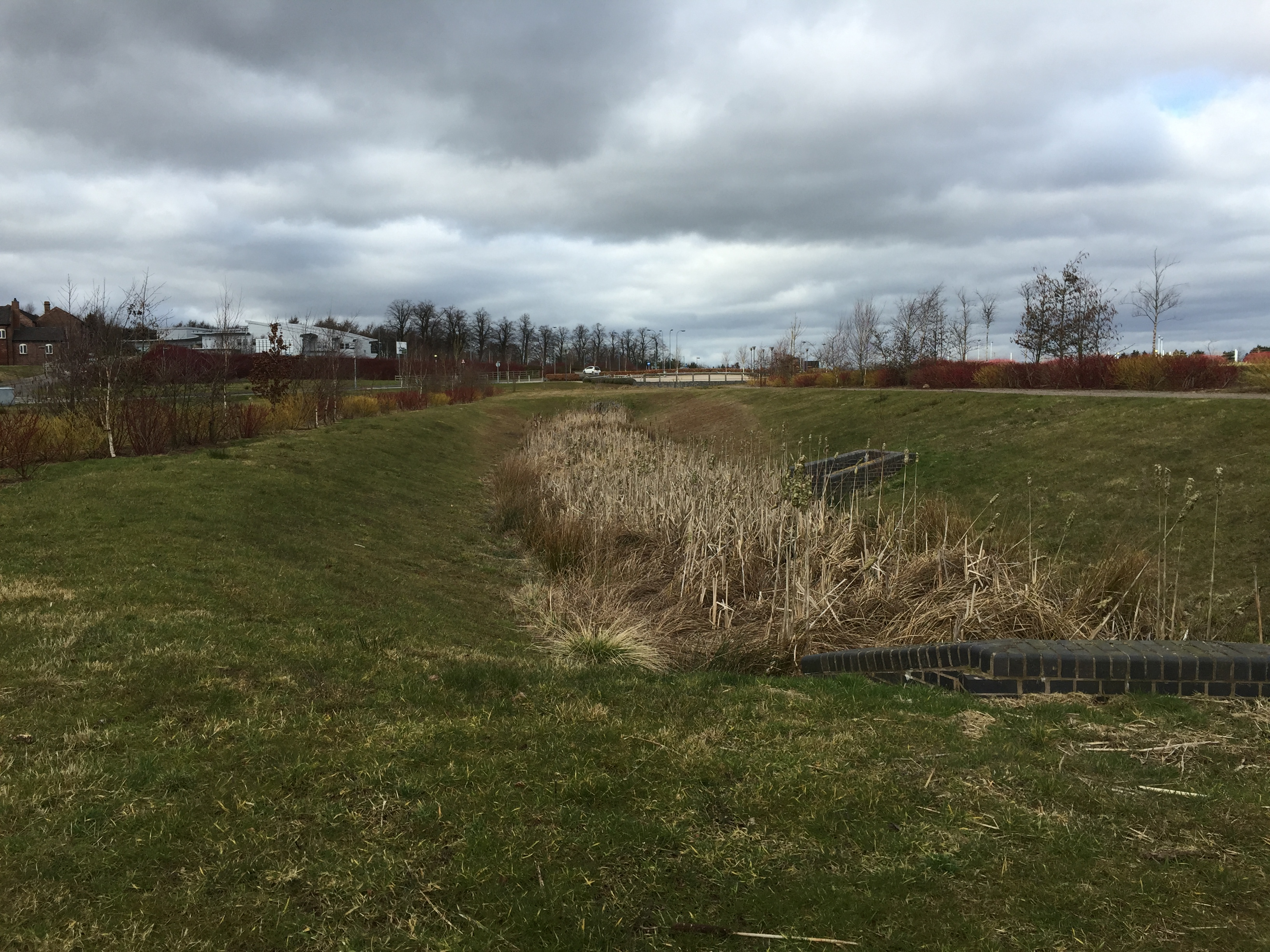
Ditch for Drainage of Rainwater

Keele University IC1

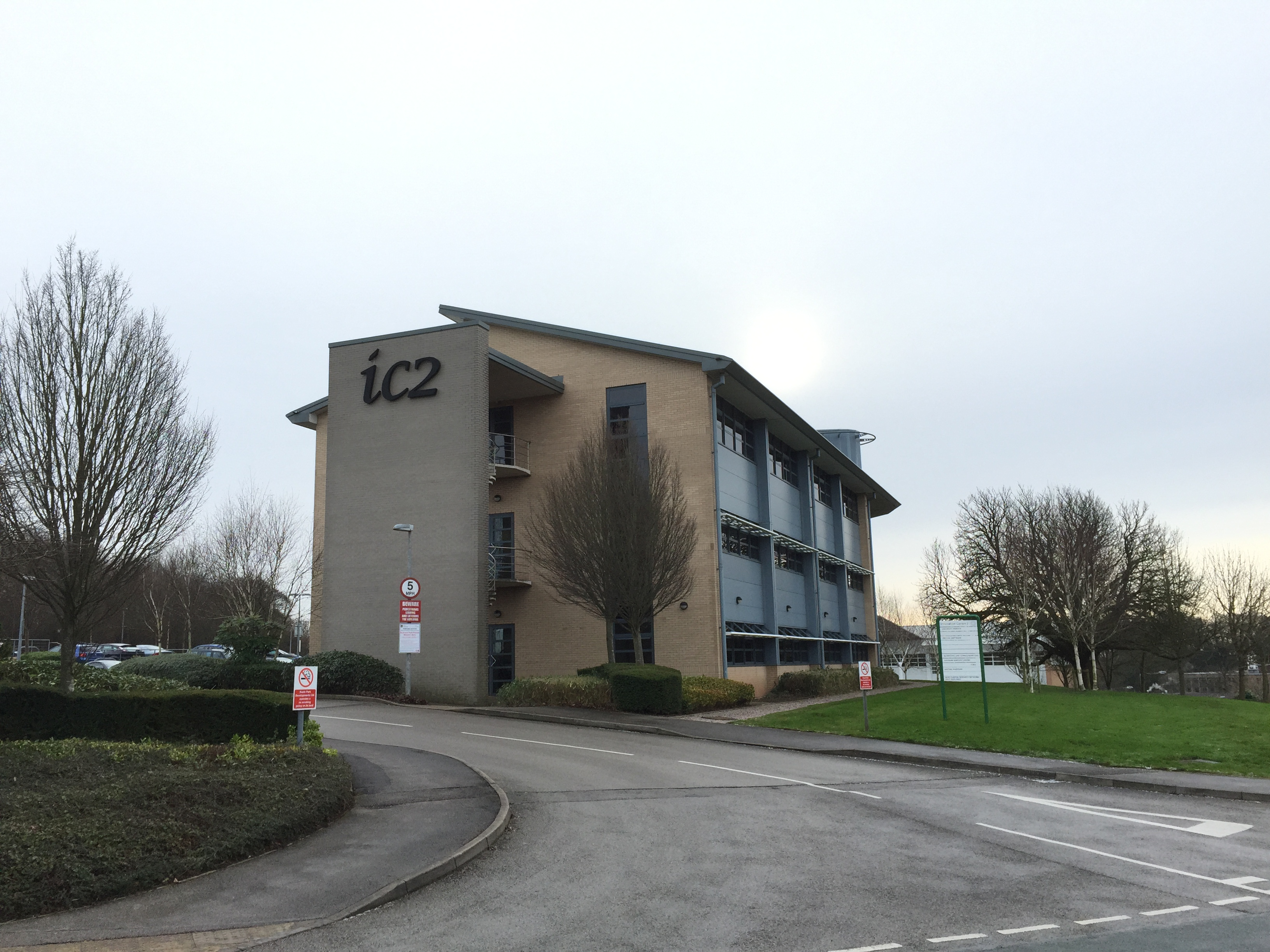
Keele University IC2

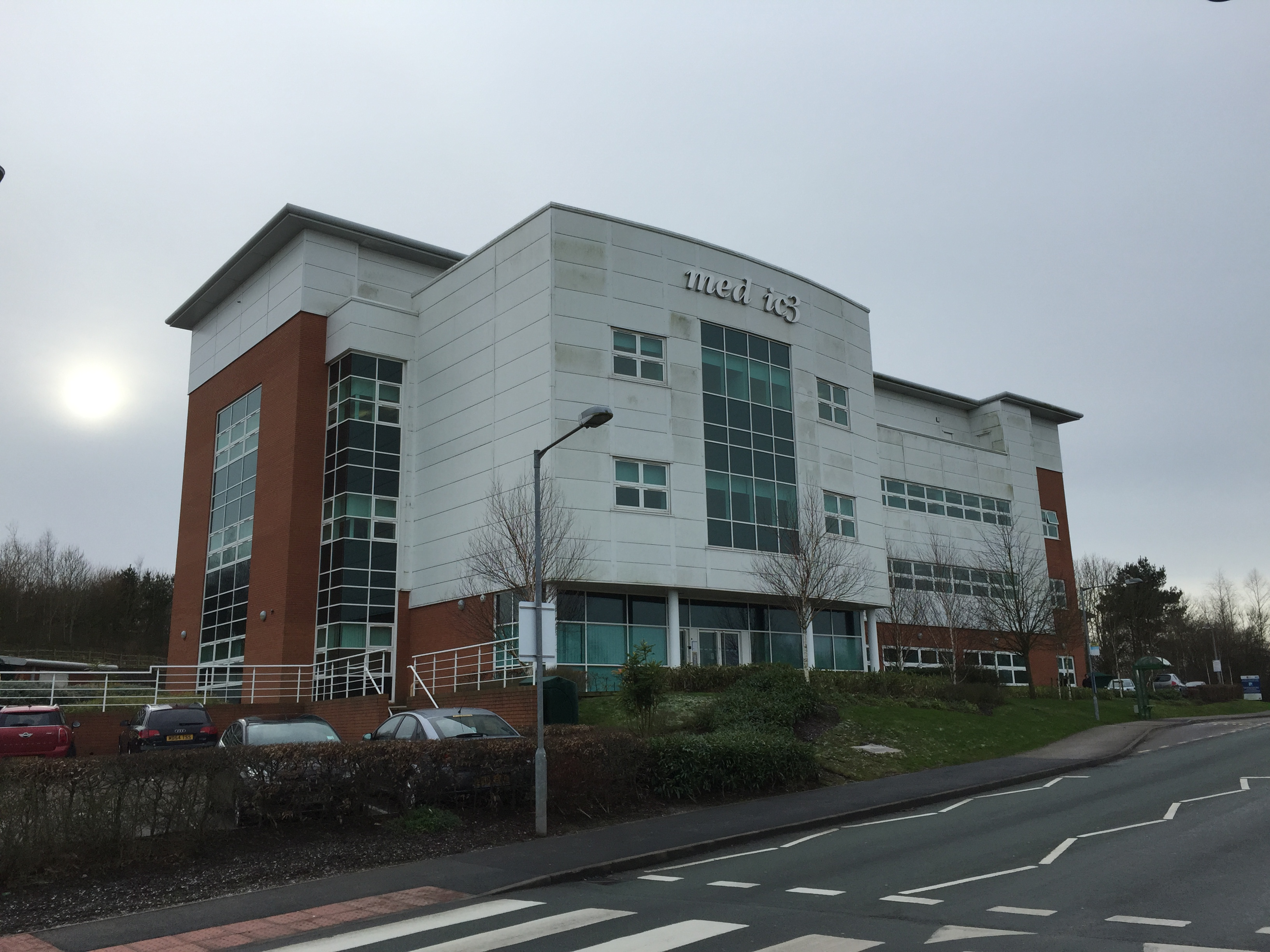
Keele University Medical IC3

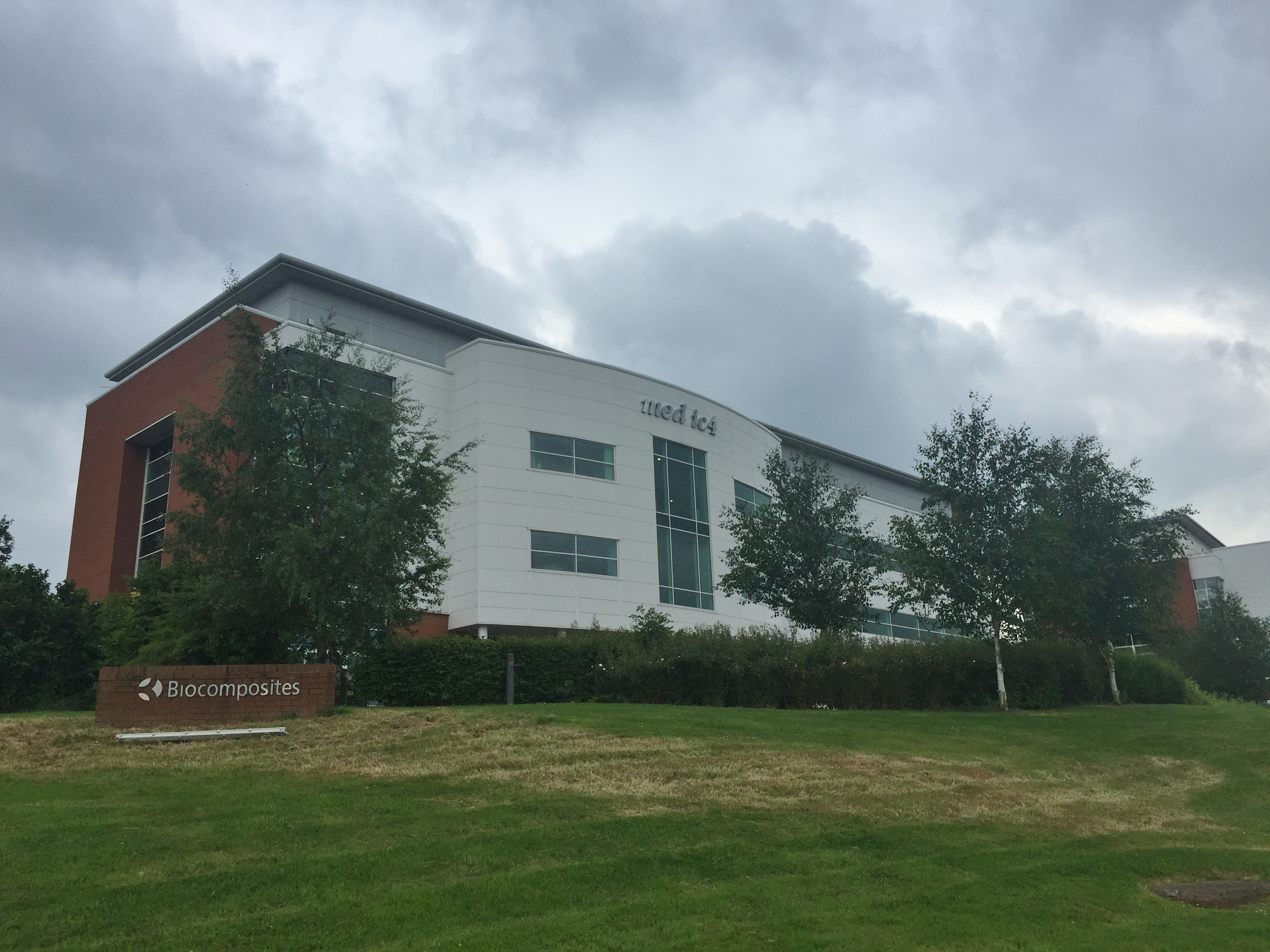
Keele University Medical IC4

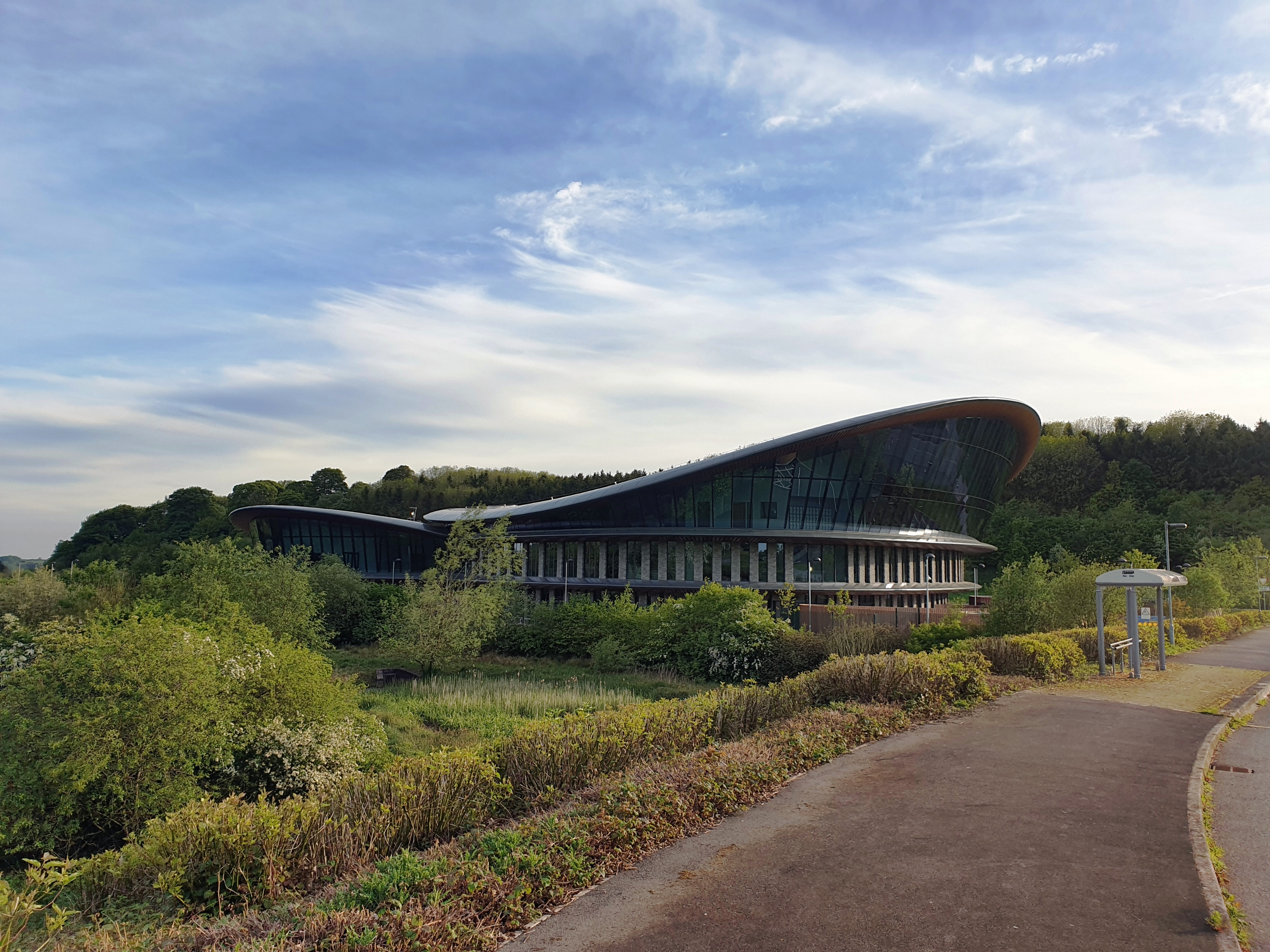
The Caudwell International Children's Centre

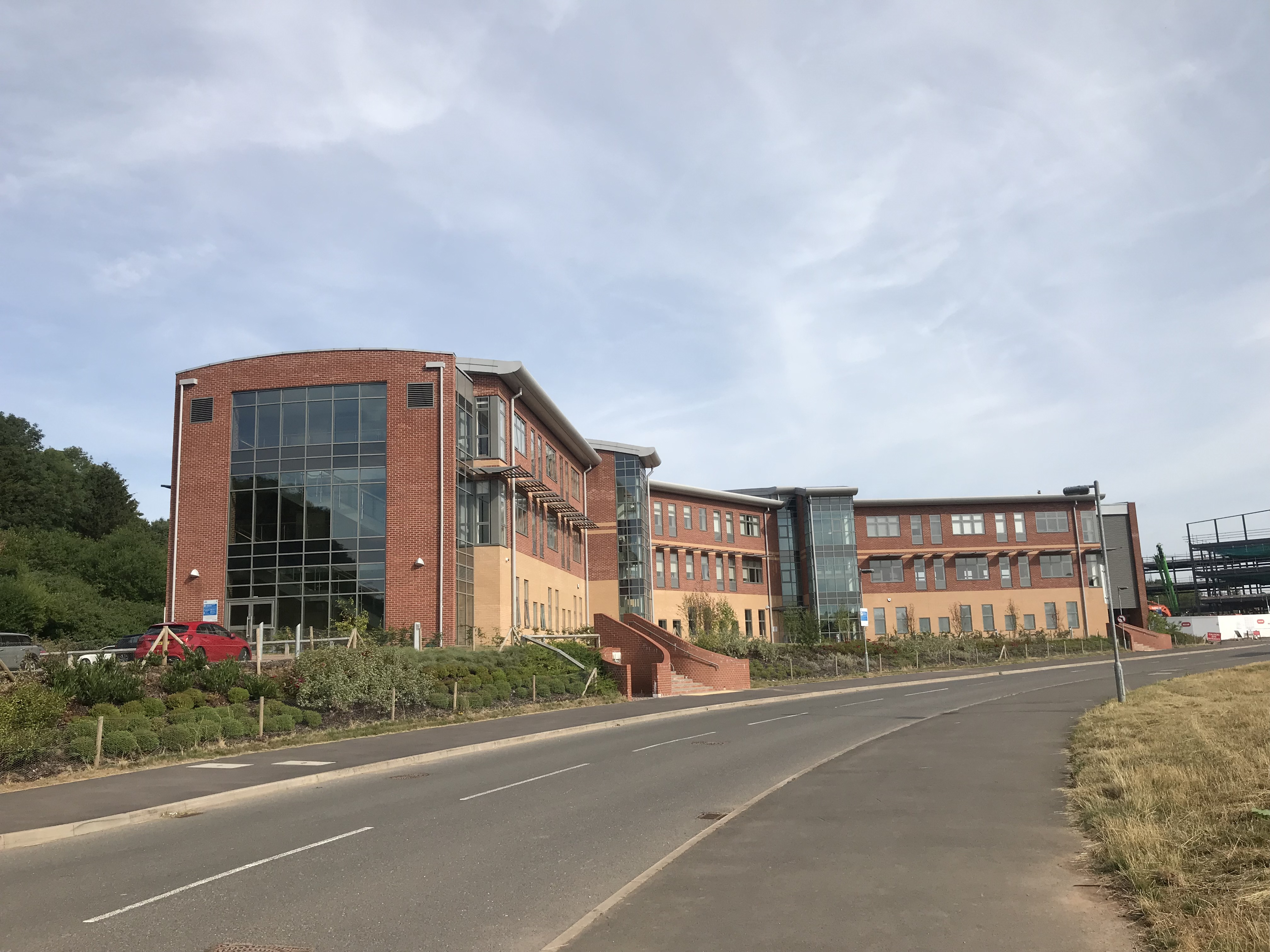
Keele University IC5
