= Bioindustry Park Silvano Fumero =

The Bioindustry Park Silvano Fumero (BiPCa) is a science and technology park located in Canavese near Turin in the north-west of Italy. The park was founded to promote and develop biotechnological research, to host companies operating research and development, and pilot production in the life science sector. Companies such as Merck Serono and Bracco chose the Park as the location for their research and development activities.

== Services ==
The park offers a set of support services to R&D activities.

The park is the owner of the Laboratory for Advanced Methodologies (LIMA) which performs exploitation of scientific results in the fields of chemistry, molecular biology, proteomics and bioinformatics. LIMA, in cooperation with the University of Turin and CNR ISPA (Consiglio Nazionale delle Ricerche), is also a permanent training site for graduates and researchers.

A University Center in Imaging Technologies (CEIP), managed by the University of Turin, is also active and is focused on the use of different technologies, such as MRI, ultrasound, and x-ray, in order to evaluate new solutions in the diagnosis and assessment of the efficacy and efficiency of drugs.

== Start-ups ==
In 2005, BiPCa launched, with the support of Regione Piemonte, the Discovery initiative to identify and select innovative entrepreneurial ideas in the Biotech field. Eight start-ups have been created since in partnership with Eporgen venture, a seed capital company focused on investment in new entrepreneurial projects in the biotech field.

== Local cluster ==
The park also acts as a system integrator for the development of a local cluster, bioPmed. Since 2009, the park acts as a cluster management company for the development of the cluster on biotech and medtech. It gathers more than 60 companies, research centres and three academic institutions (University of Turin, Università del Piemonte Orientale and Turin Polytechnic), who signed an agreement to create, build, support and animate the local cluster.

All the activities are carried out in cooperation with actors such as Turin Province and Turin Chamber of Commerce, CEIPiemonte, ALPS EEN and Patlib network, as well as synergies with other local R&D initiatives. The cluster is also a founding member of the AlpsBioCluster together with Rhône-Alpes Region (France), Lombardy, South Tirol, Bavaria and Western Switzerland that intends to promote and foster transalpine competitiveness in the biotech and medical sciences sectors.
